= 1946 Birthday Honours =

British government recognitions

The 1946 King's Birthday Honours, celebrating the official birthday of King George VI, were announced on 13 June 1946 for the United Kingdom and British Empire.

The recipients of honours are displayed here as they were styled before their new honour, and arranged by honour, with classes (Knight, Knight Grand Cross, etc.) and then divisions (Military, Civil, etc.) as appropriate.

== United Kingdom ==
=== Viscount ===
- Acting Admiral Lord Louis Francis Albert Victor Nicholas Mountbatten, GCVO, KCB, DSO, Personal Naval Aide-de-Camp to The King.

=== Baron ===
- Sir William Henry Beveridge, KCB. For public services.
- The Honourable Robert Henry Brand, CMG, DCL. For services as Representative of HM Treasury in Washington.
- The Right Honourable Sir Walter McLennan Citrine, KBE, General Secretary of the Trades Union Congress. For public services.
- George William Lucas. For political and public services.
- Marshal of the Royal Air Force Sir Cyril Louis Norton Newall, GCB, OM, GCMG, CBE, AM, Governor-General & Commander-in-Chief of New Zealand, 1941–1946.
- George Robert Shepherd, National Agent of the Labour Party since 1928. For political and public services.
- Sir Ambrose Edgar Woodall, MD, MSc, ChB, FRCS, Senior Surgeon, Manor House Hospital, Golders Green. For political and public services.

=== Privy Council ===
- The Honourable Sir Alexander George Montagu Cadogan, GCMG, KCB, Permanent United Kingdom Representative on the Security Council of the United Nations, and previously Permanent Under-Secretary of State, Foreign Office.
- The Honourable Clarence Decatur Howe, Minister of Reconstruction & Supply, Canada.
- The Right Honourable William Francis, Earl of Listowel, Postmaster-General.
- The Right Honourable Charles Clive, Viscount Mersey, CMG, CBE, A Deputy Speaker, House of Lords since 1933, and Deputy Chairman of Committees.
- Sir Hartley William Shawcross, KC, JP, MP, Attorney-General. Member of Parliament for St Helens.

=== Baronet ===
- Lieutenant-Colonel Sir Ralph Verney, CB, CIE, CVO, Secretary to the Speaker of the House of Commons since 1921.

=== Knight Bachelor ===
- Frederick Aldridge, Director of Manufactured Foods, Ministry of Food.
- Frank Binns. For services to the woollen and worsted textile industry.
- Captain Jocelyn Bray, DL, Chairman, Thames Conservancy Board. Chairman, Catchment Boards Association.
- William Allport Brockington, CBE, Director of Education for Leicester.
- Captain Ernest Geoffrey Brookes, Commodore Master, British India Steam Navigation Fleet.
- Charles Ernest Christopher Browne, Government Parliamentary Agent.
- Cyril Lodowic Burt, DSc, LLD, Professor of Psychology, University College, London.
- Henry Clay, DSc, Warden of Nuffield College. For public services.
- Edward Stewart Cripps, Senior Government Broker.
- Andrew Davidson, MD, MRCP(Ed.), FRCS(Ed.), DPH, KHP, Chief Medical Officer, Department of Health for Scotland.
- Edward De Stein, lately Director, Raw Materials Finance, Board of Trade.
- Arthur James Elvin, MBE, Managing Director of Wembley Stadium Ltd. For public services.
- George Evetts, OBE, lately Gas Adviser to the Minister of Fuel & Power.
- John Ireland Falconer, WS, Lord Provost, City of Edinburgh.
- David Gordon Brukewich Ferguson, MC, lately Director, Coal Division, Ministry of Transport.
- Brigadier-General Ernest Richard Fitzpatrick, CBE, DSO, National Chairman, British Legion.
- Cyril Thomas Flower, CB, FSA, FRHistS, Deputy Keeper of Public Records.
- Hugh Matheson Foster, TD, President of The Law Society.
- Robert Gransden, CBE, Permanent Secretary to the Cabinet of Northern Ireland and Clerk of the Privy Council of Northern Ireland.
- William Thomas Griffiths, DSc, Chairman & Managing Director of the Mond Nickel Company Ltd.
- Joseph Hallsworth, General Secretary, National Union of Distributive and Allied Workers, Past President of the Trades Union Congress General Council, Member of the Governing Body of the International Labour Office.
- Sidney West Harris, CB, CVO, Assistant Under Secretary of State, Home Office.
- Lieutenant-General Gerald Robert Stedall Hickson, CB, CBE, Royal Marines (Retired), Secretary, King George's Fund for Sailors.
- Valentine Holmes, KC, lately Junior Treasury Counsel.
- Captain Archibald Frederick Hordern, CBE, AFC, Chief Constable, Lancashire County Constabulary.
- William George Hynard, CB, CBE, Ministry of Transport Representative, Canada.
- Commander Arthur William Jarratt, RNVR, Deputy Chairman and Film Industry Liaison Officer, Royal Naval Film Corporation.
- Harry Jephcott, MSc, FRIC, Honorary Manufactured Foods Adviser to the Minister of Food.
- Clement Wakefield Jones, CB. For services to the Cabinet Office.
- Herbert Kay, CBE, General Secretary, Wholesale Clothing Manufacturers' Federation of Great Britain.
- Henry Ward Lionel Kearns, CBE, Director-General of Production Services, Ministry of Supply.
- David Lindsay Keir, LLD, Vice-Chancellor, Queen's University, Belfast.
- Alexander Lowe McColl, Chairman, Lubricating Oil Committee, Petroleum Board.
- Hector McNeill, Lord Provost, City of Glasgow.
- Everard Charles Lindley Meynell, OBE, MC, British resident in Buenos Ayres. For services to HM Treasury.
- Philip Robert Morris, CBE, lately Director-General of Army Education, War Office.
- Charles John Geoffrey Palmour, FCA, Senior Partner, Whinney, Smith & Whinney, Chartered Accountants.
- Philip Noel Panton, MB, BCh, Consultant Adviser in Pathology, Ministry of Health.
- Sydney Parkes, CBE, Chairman, City of London Savings Committee.
- Professor Leonard Gregory Parsons, MD, FRCP, FRCOG, Professor of Diseases of Children, and Dean of the Faculty of Medicine, University of Birmingham.
- Clifford Copland Paterson, OBE, DSc, MInstCE, MIEE, FRS, Director of the Research Laboratories, General Electric Company, Wembley.
- Frederick Maurice Powicke, DLit, LittD, LLD, Regius Professor of Modern History, University of Oxford.
- Reginald Claud Rootes, President of the Society of Motor Manufacturers and Traders.
- Harold Leslie Sanderson, Director of Rice, Ministry of Food.
- Harold Leonard Saunders, Comptroller-General of the Patent Office.
- Colonel James Lewis Sleeman, CB, CMG, CBE, MVO, TD, Chief Commissioner, St John Ambulance Brigade Overseas.
- Arthur John Griffiths Smout, JP, Director-General of Ammunition Production, Ministry of Supply.
- Henry Thomas, DLitt, DLit, FBA, FSA, Keeper of Printed Books, British Museum.
- Ronald Mark Cunliffe Turner, Head of the Economics Department, Control Office for Germany and Austria.
- Robert William Wharhirst, CB, CBE, Director of Armament Supply, Admiralty.
- Lieutenant-Colonel Cuthbert Wilfrid Whitaker, FSA. For services to the Corporation of the City of London.
- Robert Pelham Wilkinson, Deputy Chairman, Council of the Stock Exchange.

Dominions

- Charles Noble Arden Clarke, CMG, Resident Commissioner, Basutoland.
- The Honourable John Patrick Dwyer, Chief Justice of the Supreme Court, State of Western Australia.
- Colonel Leonard Cecil Outerbridge, CBE, DSO. For services as Honorary Private Secretary to the late Governor of Newfoundland.
- The Honourable Frederick William Richards, LLD, lately Senior Puisne Judge of the Supreme Court, State of South Australia.
- Colonel Thomas Ellis Robins, DSO, ED. For public services in Southern Rhodesia.

India

- The Honourable Lieutenant-Colonel Philip Gaisford, CIE, Indian Political Service, Resident in Mysore.
- The Honourable Mr. Justice Albert Sortain Romer Macklin, Indian Civil Service, Puisne Judge of the High Court of Judicature, Bombay.
- The Honourable Mr. Justice Kasaragod Patanashetti Lakshmana Rao, Diwan Bahadur, Puisne Judge of the High Court of Judicature at Fort St George, Madras.
- The Honourable Mr. Justice Abdul Rashid, Puisne Judge of the High Court of Judicature at Lahore, Punjab.
- The Honourable Mr. Justice Nural Azeem Khundkar, Barrister-at-Law, Puisne Judge of the High Court of Judicature at Fort William in Bengal.
- Jagannath Lakshman Sathe, CIE, Indian Civil Service, lately Adviser to His Excellency the Governor of the United Provinces.
- Cyril Walter Gurner, CSI, Indian Civil Service, lately Adviser to His Excellency the Governor of Bengal.
- Wilfred Harold Shoobert, CIE, ED, Indian Civil Service, Secretary to the Government of India in the Department of Posts & Air and lately Director-General, Posts & Telegraphs, New Delhi.
- Major-General Gordon Covell, CIE, MD, BS, DPH, DTM&H, KHP, Indian Medical Service, Director, Malaria Institute of India, Delhi.
- Lieutenant-Colonel Chandeshwar Prasad Narayan Singh, CIE, Zamindar, Vice-Chancellor of the Patna University, Bihar.
- William Raymond Fitzgerald, lately General Manager, Bengal Nagpur Railway, Calcutta.
- Sudhansu Mohan Bose, Barrister-at-Law, Advocate-General, Government of Bengal.
- Phillip Herbert Joseph Measures, CBE, Indian Police, Inspector-General of Police, United Provinces.
- William Herbert Fletcher Armstrong, CIE, Indian Educational Service, Director of Public Instruction and Secretary to Government, Education Department, Punjab.
- Raja Bahadur Sri Ram Chandra Mardaraj Deo, of Khallikote, Landholder, Member of the Legislative Assembly (Central), Orissa.
- Arthur William Henry Dean, CIE, MC, Indian Service of Engineers, Chairman, Delhi Improvement Trust, and lately Chief Engineer, Central Public Works Department, Government of India.
- Lieutenant-Colonel Clive Kirkpatrick Daly, CSI, CIE, National Savings Commissioner, Finance Department, Government of India.
- Ghulam Mohammed, CIE, lately Finance Member, His Exalted Highness the Nizam's Government, Hyderabad, Deccan.
- James Jones, CIE, Director, Messrs. James Finlay & Co. Ltd., lately Chairman, Indian Tea Association.
- Kariamanikkam Srinivasa Krishnan, FRS, Professor of Physics, Allahabad University.
- Khan Bahadur Manekji Navrosji Mehta, CIE, MBE, Merchant, Poona, Bombay.
- Fazal Ibrahim Rahimtoola, CIE, Businessman, Bombay.
- Lala Shankar Lall, Businessman, Delhi.

Colonies, Protectorates, etc.

- Frederick Bernard Carr, CMG, Colonial Administrative Service, Chief Commissioner, Eastern Provinces, Nigeria.
- Herbert Charles Fahie Cox, Colonial Legal Service, Chief Justice, Northern Rhodesia.
- Edward Enoch Jenkins, Colonial Legal Service, Chief Justice, Nyasaland.
- Alec Seath Kirkbride, CMG, OBE, MC, Colonial Administrative Service, British Resident, Trans-Jordan.
- Gilbert McCall Rennie, CMG, MC, Colonial Administrative Service, Chief Secretary, Kenya.
- John Valentine Wistar Shaw, CMG, Colonial Administrative Service, Chief Secretary, Palestine.

=== Order of the Bath ===
==== Knight Grand Cross of the Order of the Bath (GCB) ====
Military Division

- General Sir Hastings Lionel Ismay, CH, KCB, DSO.

Civil Division

- Sir (John) Donald Balfour Fergusson, KCB, Permanent Secretary, Ministry of Fuel & Power, and until recently Permanent Secretary, Ministry of Agriculture & Fisheries.

==== Knight Commander of the Order of the Bath (KCB) ====
Military Division

Royal Navy

- Vice-Admiral Charles Eric Morgan, CB, DSO.
- Vice-Admiral Victor Alexander Charles Crutchley, VC, CB, DSC.
- Vice-Admiral John Hereward Edelsten, CB, CBE.

Army

- Lieutenant-General (acting) Rob McGregor Macdonald Lockhart, CB, CIE, MC, Indian Army.
- Lieutenant-General (temporary) Sir Arthur Francis Smith, KBE, CB, DSO, MC, late Foot Guards.

Civil Division

- Charles Seymour Wright, CB, OBE, MC.
- Sir (Walter) Raymond Birchall, KBE, CB, Director-General, General Post Office.
- Oliver Shewell Franks, CB, CBE, Permanent Secretary, Ministry of Supply.
- Sir Bernard William Gilbert, KBE, CB, Second Secretary, HM Treasury.
- John Primatt Redcliffe Maud, CBE, Permanent Secretary, Ministry of Education.

==== Companion of the Order of the Bath (CB) ====
Military Division

Royal Navy

- Surgeon Vice-Admiral Henry St Clair Colson, CBE, MB, BS, DPH.
- Rear-Admiral Randolph Stewart Gresham Nicholson, DSO, DSC.
- Rear-Admiral Henry Jack Egerton.
- Rear-Admiral Richard Shelley, CBE.
- Rear-Admiral Henry Cecil Bovell, CBE, DSO.
- Engineer Rear-Admiral Charles William Lambert.
- Engineer Rear-Admiral Sydney Oswell Frew.
- Instructor Captain William Isaac Saxton, OBE, MA.

Army

- Brigadier (temporary) Hugh Scott Scott-Barrett, CBE, TD, Extra-Regimentally Employed List.
- Major-General (temporary) William Henry Alexander Bishop, OBE, late Infantry.
- Lieutenant-General (acting) Harold Rawdon Briggs, CBE, DSO, 10th Baluch Regiment, Indian Army.
- Major-General Neil Cantlie, MC, MB FRCS, late Royal Army Medical Corps. Honorary Physician to The King.
- Major-General Geoffrey Cheetham, DSO, MC, Corps of Royal Engineers.
- Colonel John Conyers D'Arcy, CBE, MC, late Royal Regiment of Artillery.
- Major-General (temporary) John Cecil Alexander Dowse, CBE, MC, MB, late Royal Army Medical Corps.
- Lieutenant-General (temporary) Charles Henry Gairdner, CBE, late Royal Armoured Corps.
- Colonel (local) Bernard Charles Hartley, OBE, General List.
- Major-General (temporary) Eric Charles Hayes, late Infantry.
- Major-General (acting) Brian Charles Hannam Kimmins, CBE, late Royal Regiment of Artillery.
- Major-General (acting) Robert Stidman Lewis, OBE, Indian Army Ordnance Corps.
- Major-General (acting) Christopher Michael Maltby, MC, Indian Army.
- Brigadier (temporary) John Edward Chalmers McCandlish, CBE, late Corps of Royal Engineers.
- Major-General David Vincent O'Malley, OBE, MB, BCh (NUI), VHS, Indian Medical Service.
- Major-General (temporary) Robert Philip Lancaster Ranking, CBE, MC, Indian Army.
- Brigadier (temporary) Robert St George Tyldesley Ransome, CBE, MC, The Royal Fusiliers (City of London Regiment).
- Major-General (temporary) Cecil Stanway Sugden, CBE, Corps of Royal Engineers.
- Major-General (temporary) James Noel Thomson, DSO, MC, ADC, late Royal Regiment of Artillery.
- Major-General (temporary) Douglas Ashton Lofft Wade, OBE, MC, late Royal Corps of Signals.
- Major-General (temporary) Thomas Needham Furnival Wilson, DSO, MC, late Infantry.
- Major-General (temporary) Thomas John Willoughby Winterton, CBE, late Infantry.

Royal Air Force

- Air Vice-Marshal Gerard Combe.
- Air Vice-Marshal Walter John Brice Curtis, CBE.
- Air Vice-Marshal Alexander Paul Davidson, CBE.
- Air Vice-Marshal Charles Edward Neville Guest, CBE.
- Air Vice-Marshal Arthur Edward Panter, MRCS, LRCP, KHS.
- Air Vice-Marshal Donald Fasken Stevenson, CBE, DSO, MC.
- Air Vice-Marshal Sydney Edward Toomer, CBE, DFC.
- Air Commodore George William Birkinshaw.
- Air Commodore Donald William Clappen.
- Air Commodore Thomas Fawdry, CBE.
- Air Commodore Raymund George Hart, CBE, MC.
- Air Commodore Walter Thorne, CBE.
- Air Commodore Frederick Edward Vernon OBE.
- Air Commodore Claude McClean Vincent, DFC, AFC.
- Acting Air Commodore George Philip Chamberlain, OBE.
- Group Captain Henry Edward Nowell, OBE.

Civil Division

- Hamish Duncan MacLaren, DFC, BSc.
- Major William Marshall Dugdale, DSO, TD, Chairman, Territorial Army Association of the County of Montgomery.
- Colonel the Right Honourable Hugh William, Earl Fortescue, OBE, MC, President and Chairman, Territorial Army and Air Force Association of the County of Devon.
- Colonel Thomas James Morrill, TD, Chairman, Territorial Army and Air Force Association of the County of the East Riding of York.
- William George Esterbrooke Burnett, Commissioner of Inland Revenue.
- Charles Craik Cunningham, GVO, Deputy Secretary, Scottish Home Department.
- Thomas Wilson Fox Dalton, Accountant-General, Ministry of Labour & National Service.
- Edward George Fudge, CBE, Under Secretary, Ministry of Fuel & Power.
- John Gibson Gibson, Principal Assistant Secretary, Air Ministry.
- Robert Macdonald Gould, Chief Industrial Commissioner, Ministry of Labour & National Service.
- Ernest Saphir Hill, Under Secretary, Ministry of Town & Country Planning.
- Frederick Charles Johnson, Receiver for the Metropolitan Police District.
- John Gerald Lang, Under Secretary, Admiralty.
- Rudolf Alexander Little, Director of Postal Services, General Post Office.
- Eric Dickson Macgregor, Director of Establishments, Ministry of Health.
- William Stuart Murrie, Under Secretary, Cabinet Office.
- George Sherard Owen, Under Secretary, Board of Trade.
- Philip Dennis Proctor, Under Secretary, HM Treasury.
- William Edmund Hodges Rhydderch, Secretary and Commissioner, Board of Customs & Excise.
- Nevill Digby Bosworth Smith, Under Secretary, Ministry of Education.

=== Order of Merit (OM) ===
- Field Marshal The Right Honourable Alan Francis, Viscount Alanbrooke, GCB, DSO.
- Admiral of the Fleet The Right Honourable Andrew Browne, Viscount Cunningham of Hyndhope, KT, GCB, DSO.
- The Right Honourable Edward Frederick Lindley, Earl of Halifax, KG, GCSI, GCIE, TD.

=== Order of the Star of India ===
==== Knight Commander of the Order of the Star of India (KCSI) ====
- Captain His Highness Raja Shrimant Sir Chintamanrao Dhundirao alias Appasaheb Patwardhan, KCIE, Raja of Sangli.
- The Honourable Sir Jwala Prasad Srivastava, KBE, Member of the Governor-General's Executive Council.
- The Honourable Sardar Sir Jogendra Singh, Member of the Governor-General's Executive Council.
- The Honourable Khan Bahadur Maulvi Sir Muhammad Azizul Haque, CIE, Member of the Governor-General's Executive Council.
- Major-General (Local Lieutenant-General) Gordon Wilson, CB, CBE, MC, KHS, British Service (late RAMC), Director, Medical Services in India.
- Major-General (Temporary Lieutenant-General) Alfred Reade Godwin-Austen, CB, OBE, MC, British Service, Principal Administrative Officer, General Headquarters, India.
- Rao Bahadur Sir Vangal Thiruvenkata Krishnamachari, KCIE, lately Dewan, Baroda State.

==== Companion of the Order of the Star of India (CSI) ====
- Graham Linsel Vivian, CIE, Indian Civil Service, lately Adviser to His Excellency the Governor of the United Provinces.
- Ronald Leslie Walker, CIE, Indian Civil Service, lately Adviser to His Excellency the Governor of Bengal.
- John Edward Pedley, CIE, MC, Indian Civil Service, lately Adviser to His Excellency the Governor of the United Provinces.
- Rao Bahadur Vapal Pangunni Menon, CIE, Reforms Commissioner to the Government of India, and Secretary to the Governor-General (Public).
- Samuel Harrison Yardley Oulsnam, CIE, MC, Indian Civil Servire, Secretary to the Government of India in the Department of Health.
- Maurice William Walter Murray Yeatts, CIE, Indian Civil Service, Secretary to the Government of India in the Department of Industries & Supplies.
- Vyakarana Narahari Rao, CIE, Indian Audit & Accounts Service, Secretary to the Government of India in the Finance Department.
- Hugh Weightman, CIE, Indian Political Service, Secretary to the Government of India in the External Affairs Department.
- Herbert Tower Sorley, CIE, Indian Civil Service, Chief Secretary to Government, Political & Services Department, Bombay.
- Raja Ramanuj Pratap Singh Deo, Raja of Korea.
- Colonel (Temporary Major-General) Frederick Whitmore Burch, CIE, MC, Indian Army, lately Major-General i/c Victory Celebrations.
- Harry Greenfield, CIE, Member, Central Board of Revenue, Government of India.
- Major-General John Patrick Huban, OBE, KETS, Indian Medical Service, Surgeon-General with the Government of Madras.
- Arthur Sheldon Hands, CIE, MC, Indian Civil Service, Commissioner of the Presidency Division, Bengal.
- Joseph Richard Harrison, CIE, Deputy Coal Commissioner, Government of India and Chief Mining Engineer, Railway Board.
- Charles Vanne Salusbury, CIE, Indian Civil Service, Second Additional Financial Commissioner and Additional Secretary to Government, Revenue Department, Punjab.
- Ernest William Cornish Wace, CIE, Indian Police, Deputy Inspector-General of Police, Criminal Investigation Department, Punjab.

=== Order of St Michael and St George ===
==== Knight Grand Cross of the Order of St Michael and St George (GCMG) ====
- Sir Alan Cuthbert Maxwell Burns, KCMG, Governor & Commander-in-Chief of the Gold Coast.

==== Knight Commander of the Order of St Michael and St George (KCMG) ====
- Gerald Hallen Creasy, CMG, OBE, Assistant Under-Secretary of State, Colonial Office.
- Frank Charles Gimson, CMG, Governor, Singapore.
- Harold Beresford Butler, CB, Director-General of British Information Services, United States of America.
- Oliver Charles Harvey, CB, CMG, Deputy Under-Secretary of State in the Foreign Office.
- John Helier Le Rougetel, CMG, MC, His Majesty's Ambassador Extraordinary & Plenipotentiary at Tehran.
- Philip Bouverie Bowyer Nichols, CMG, MC, His Majesty's Ambassador Extraordinary & Plenipotentiary at Prague.
- Edward Henry Gerald Shepherd, CMG, His Majesty's Envoy Extraordinary & Minister Plenipotentiary at Reykjavik.

==== Companion of the Order of St Michael and St George (CMG) ====
- William Ogden Hart, JP, lately Head of the British Merchant Shipping Mission, Washington, DC.
- James Reginald Carroll Helmore, Under-Secretary, Board of Trade.
- Leonard Gibbs Killby, Director, Empire Cotton Growing Corporation.
- Richard Royle Powell, Assistant Secretary, Admiralty.
- Eric Crawford Tansley, Director of Marketing, West African Produce Control Board, Colonial Office.
- Major-General Gerald Walter Robert Templer, CB, OBE, DSO, Deputy Chief of Staff, British Element, Control Commission for Germany.
- Donald Joule Wardley, MC, Principal Assistant Secretary, British Middle East Office, Cairo.
- George Preston Bradney, CBE, lately Comptroller and Auditor General, Newfoundland.
- Vernon Arthur Lewis, MC, Puisne Judge of the High Court, Southern Rhodesia.
- Gordon Burns Rolph, OBE. For services in connection with philanthropic and patriotic movements in the State of Tasmania.
- Arthur John Fanant Bunning, General Manager, Nigeria Railway.
- Leonard George Corney, Colonial Audit Service, lately Auditor, Straits Settlements and Federated Malay States.
- Major Eric Aldhelm Torlogh Button, CBE, Colonial Administrative Service, Chief Secretary, Zanzibar.
- Noel Edward Ernst, Land Commissioner, Ceylon.
- Sidney Herbert Fazan, CBE, lately Provincial Commissioner, Kenya.
- Hugh Mackintosh Foot, OBE, Colonial Administrative Service, Colonial Secretary, Jamaica.
- Robert Spence Foster, OBE, lately Director of Education, Kenya.
- Major John Bagot Glubb, OBE, DSO, MC, Colonial Administrative Service, Officer Commanding Arab Legion, Palestine.
- Julian Dudley Hall, lately British Adviser, Kedah.
- Rowland Skeffington Hudson, Colonial Administrative Service, Secretary for Native Affairs, Northern Rhodesia.
- Stephen Elliot Vyvyan Luke, Assistant Secretary, Colonial Office.
- Noel Allan Middlemas, Director of Surveys, Land Officer and Commissioner of Mines, Uganda.
- Colonel Walter Angus Muller, Colonial Police Service, Commissioner of Police, Trinidad.
- Roland Arthur Charles North, lately Secretary, Chinese Affairs, Hong Kong.
- William Frank Page, Colonial Administrative Service, Provincial Commissioner, Tanganyika Territory.
- Sydney Phillipson, Colonial Administrative Service, Financial Secretary, Nigeria.
- Captain James Huey Hamill Pollock, OBE, Colonial Administrative Service, District Commissioner, Jerusalem, Palestine.
- Lieutenant Colonel Victor William Williams Saunders Purcell, Colonial Administrative Service, Officer Class II, Malaya.
- Kenneth Owen Roberts-Wray, Legal Adviser, Colonial Office and Dominions Office.
- Colonel Sidney Carman Saward, MC, MM, Colonial Survey Office, Director of Surveys, Gold Coast.
- Roland Evelyn Turnbull, Colonial Administrative Service, Colonial Secretary, Cyprus.
- Henry Harrison Vaskess, OBE, Colonial Administrative Service, Secretary to Western Pacific High Commission.
- The Right Reverend Leonard Wilson, Lord Bishop of Singapore.
- Commander Hugh Christopher Arnold-Forster, Royal Navy, attached to a Department of the Foreign Office.
- John Eltringham Coulson, Acting Head of the Economic Relations Department of the Foreign Office.
- Gerald Gray Fitzmaurice, Second Legal Adviser in the Foreign Office.
- Colin Mackenzie, until recently attached to the staff of the Supreme Allied Commander, South East Asia.
- George Frederick March, MC, Director of Agriculture & Forests, Sudan Government.
- William Horace Montagu-Pollock, Head of the Cultural Relations Department of the Foreign Office.
- Norman Ernest Keown Nash, a member of the News Department of the Foreign Office.
- Frank Kenyon Roberts, Acting Counsellor at His Majesty's Embassy in Moscow.
- Christopher Eden Steel, MVO, Counsellor in His Majesty's Foreign Service.
- Colonel Harold Raphael Gaetano Stevens, DSO, Commentator in the European Service of the British Broadcasting Corporation.

Honorary Companions

- Alhaji Muhammadu Mafindi, CBE, Emir of Muri, Nigeria.
- Godfrey Okoro, Akenzua II Oba of Benin, Nigeria.

=== Order of the Indian Empire ===
==== Knight Commander of the Order of the Indian Empire (KCIE) ====
- The Honourable Mr Arthur Allen Waugh, CSI, CIE, Indian Civil Service, Member of the Governor-General's Executive Council.
- Maulavi Saiyid Sir Muhammad Saadulla, lately Prime Minister, Government of Assam.
- The Honourable Lieutenant-Colonel Walter Fendall Campbell, CIE, Indian Political Service, Resident for Central India.
- Sir Arthur Cecil Griffin, OBE, Chief Commissioner of Railways.
- Major-General (Temporary Lieutenant-General) Kenneth Morley Loch, CB, MC, late Royal Artillery, Master-General of the Ordnance in India.
- Henry Carlos Prior, CSI, CIE, Indian Civil Service, Secretary to the Government of India in the Department of Works, Mines & Power.
- Narayanan Raghavan Pillai, CIE, CBE, Indian Civil Service, Secretary to the Government of India in the Department of Commerce.
- Sir George Richard Frederick Tottenham, CSI, CIE, Indian Civil Service, Officer on Special Duty, Home Department, Government of India.
- Paul Joseph Patrick, CSI, Assistant Under-Secretary of State for India, London.
- Major-General Horace Eckford Roome, CB, CBE, MC, late Royal Engineers, lately Engineer-in-Chief, General Headquarters, India.
- Sir Kenneth Grant Mitchell, CIE, Indian Service of Engineers, Chief Controller of Road Transport & Development, War Transport Department, Government of India.
- Sir Homi Mehta, KBE, Businessman, Bombay.
- Maharaja Sir Pateshwari Prasad Singh, of Balrampur, Balrampur Estate, Gonda District, United Provinces.

==== Companion of the Order of the Indian Empire (CIE) ====
- Khan Bahadur Maulavi Sayidur Rahman, lately Education Minister, Government of Assam, Dibrugarh, Assam.
- Lakshman Trimbak Gholap, Indian Civil Service, Controller of Indian Shipping and ex officio Joint Secretary to the Government of India in the Department of Commerce.
- Govarpat Krishhaswamy Seshadri Sarma, Indian Audit & Accounts Service, Crown Finance Officer, India.
- Ammembal Vittal Pai, OBE, Indian Civil Service, Joint Secretary to the Government of India and Controller-General of Emigration, Commonwealth Relations Department.
- Jayavant Mallannah Shrinagesh, Indian Civil Service, Joint Secretary to the Government of India in the Department of Industries & Supplies (Munitions Production Branch).
- Colonel (Temporary Major-General) Donald Roland Edwin Rowan Bateman, DSO, OBE, The Baluch Regiment, Director of Military Training, General Headquarters, India.
- Lieutenant-Colonel (Acting Major-General) John Steventon Ballentine, Royal Deccan Horse (IAC), Major-General i/c, Administration, Eastern Command.
- Colonel (Temporary Major-General) Francis Malcolm Moore, Indian Army, lately Director, Selection of Personnel, General Headquarters, India.
- Vithal Shivram Bhide, Indian Civil Service, Commissioner, Southern Division, Bombay.
- Cardwell Sinclair Gunning, OBE, Indian Civil Service, Commissioner of Divisions, Gauhati, Assam.
- Diwan Bahadur Ketoli Chengappa, Chief Commissioner, Coorg.
- Cadambi Sheshachar Venkatachar, OBE, Indian Civil Service, Commissioner, Allahabad Division, United Provinces.
- Richard De Kirklington Maynard, General Manager, Madras and Southern Mahratta Railway, Madras.
- Colonel Harold Leslie Hopkins, OBE, lately General Manager, Docks & Railways, Bombay Port Trust.
- Christopher Herbert Cooke, Indian Civil Service, Commissioner, Lucknow Division, United Provinces.
- Stanley Grisewood Taylor, Indian Police, Inspector-General of Police, Bengal.
- Colonel (Temporary Brigadier) Mark Symonds Teversham, MC, Indian Army, Director of Quartering, General Headquarters, India.
- Colonel (Temporary Brigadier) William Hesketh, B.Sc.(Eng.), AMInstCE, I.A.O.C, Director of Mechanization, General Headquarters, India.
- Colonel (Temporary Brigadier) Frank Borkman Pigott, late Royal Engineers, Brigadier (Works Services), Engineer-in-Chief's Branch, General Headquarters, India.
- Colonel (Temporary Brigadier) Roger Gillies Ekin, Indian Army, Commander, Nowshera Brigade.
- Lieutenant-Colonel (Temporary Brigadier) John James Pollock Conolly, The Sikh Regiment, Commander (109 Bangalore Area).
- Pestonji Nanabhai Moos, Indian Civil Service, Secretary to Government, Legal Department, and Remembrancer of Legal Affairs, Bombay.
- Venkataraya Narayana Kudva, Indian Civil Service, Secretary to the Government of Madras in the Public Works Department.
- Bhola Nath Jha, Indian Civil Service, Secretary to Government, Revenue Department, United Provinces.
- Hundi Srinivasa Kamath, Indian Civil Service, Secretary to Government, Central Provinces and Berar.
- Thomas Douglas Wickenden, Indian Civil Service, Secretary to Government, Central Provinces and Berar.
- William Henry Edward Garrod, Indian Service of Engineers, Secretary to Government and Chief Engineer, Public Works Department, Roads & Buildings, Bombay.
- Colin Robert Baillie Murray, Indian Police, Inspector-General of Police, Orissa.
- Arthur Eatough Green, OBE, MC, Indian Service of Engineers, Secretary to Government in the Public Works Department, and Chief Engineer, Bihar.
- Balwant Rai Tandan, Indian Civil Service, Secretary to Government, Finance Department, Punjab.
- Sundaram Ayyar Venkateswaran, Indian Civil Service, Provincial Textile Commissioner, Madras.
- Lieutenant-Colonel Gurdial Singh Gill, OBE, Indian Medical Service, Inspector-General of Prisons, Madras.
- Colonel Norman Briggs, Indian Medical Service, Inspector-General of Civil Hospitals, United Provinces.
- Colonel Jack Sidney Bates Gentry, OBE, Royal Engineers, Deputy Port Director, Regional Port Directorate, Calcutta.
- Walter Treweeke Biscoe, Chief Operating Superintendent, North-Western Railway, Lahore.
- Joshua Forbes Russell, OBE, Indian Service of Engineers, Chief Engineer in the Irrigation Branch of the Communications & Works Department, Bengal.
- Thomas Malo Coffey, Indian Forest Service, Chief Conservator of Forests, Bengal.
- Douglas Colin Campbell, Director of Accounts, Railway Board, New Delhi.
- Colonel Harry Macdonald, CB, DSO, IRRO, Deputy Director of Recruiting, Northern Area.
- Captain Percy Hewitt Learmont, Royal Indian Navy.
- Lieutenant-Colonel (Temporary Colonel) Daya Ram Thapar, OBE, Indian Medical Service/Indian Army Medical Corps, Commandant, Indian Army Medical Corps, Headquarters, Poona.
- Sri Diwan Bahadur Velliyur Nott Visvanatha Rao, Collector and District Magistrate, Madras.
- Rai Bahadur Samuel Das, District Magistrate and Collector, Cuttack, Orissa.
- Konnanath Rama Krishna Menon, MBE, Indian Audit and Accounts Service, Director of Inspection (Income-tax), Government of India.
- Lieutenant-Colonel Arnold Crawshaw Galloway, OBE, Indian Political Service, Political Agent, Bahrain.
- Gordon William Benton, Indian Police, Deputy Inspector-General of Police, Central Provinces and Berar.
- Bertram St. Leger Ten Broeke, MC, Indian Police, Deputy Inspector-General of Police, Criminal Investigation Department, Bihar.
- Walter Cyril Plumb, Indian Police, Deputy Inspector-General of Police, Jullundur Range, Jullundur, Punjab.
- Gilbert Waddell, Indian Police, Deputy Inspector-General of Police, United Provinces.
- Khan Bahadur Muhammed Zaman Khan, Postmaster-General, Punjab and North-West Frontier Circle, Lahore.
- Lieutenant-Colonel Donald Reginald Cavendish Hartley, CBE, DSO, ED, Commandant, Bombay Civic Guards, Bombay.
- Mulk Raj Sachdev, OBE, Director-General of Civil Supplies and Rationing and Additional Secretary to Government, Punjab, Civil Supplies Department.
- Major (Temporary Lieutenant-Colonel) Edward James Corbett, VD, Indian Army, Lecturer on Jungle Lore, HQ Central Command.
- Lieutenant-Colonel Ronald Cardew Duncan, MVO, OBE, Brigadier in, and Commandant, Jodhpur State Forces.
- Captain Ulric William Ferrier Walker, MRCVS, MC, Indian Veterinary Service, Director, Veterinary Department, Punjab.
- Henry Crookshank, BAI, Superintending Geologist, Geological Survey of India.
- Ernest Cecil Marchant, Principal, Daly College, Indore.
- Lieutenant-Colonel Desmond Roe Crone, OBE, Royal Engineers, Superintendent, Survey of India.
- Major Abdus Samad Shah, OBE, Information & Arts Department, Government of India.
- Khan Bahadur Syed Ainuddin, OBE, Dewan, Datia State, Central India.
- Guru Sharan Lal, Businessman, lately Trade Adviser, Government of Bihar.
- Sardar Bahadur Gurdial Singh Harika, OBI, IDSM, Lieutenant-General in, and Chief of the General Staff, Patiala State Forces.
- Wilfred Alexander Henderson, lately Director, Merchant Ship Repairs, Department of Supply, Government of India.
- Shahzada Jehanzeb Abdul Haq, Wali Ahad of Swat State, North-West Frontier Province.
- Charles Edward Miller Judge, OBE, Resident, Director and Managing Agent of The Raza Sugar Co., Rampur State.
- John Edmond Moloney, Director of Shipbuilding, Department of Industries & Supplies, Government of India.
- Herbert Francis Mooney, OBE, Chief Forest Adviser, Eastern States.
- Tarak Nath Mukerjea, MBE, Zemindar, Uttarpara, Hooghly District, Bengal.
- Ramchandrarao Shamrao Patil (Mane), FRES, FRSS (Lond.), Naib Dewan, Baroda State.
- Sardar Bahadur Balwant Singh Puri, OBE, Secretary, Indian Red Cross Society, and General Secretary, St John Ambulance Association (Indian Council).
- Raja Radhika Raman Prasad Sinha, Zamindar, Surajpura, Shahabad District, District Leader, National War Front, Bihar.
- William Frederick West, Director-General, India Stores Department, Office of the High Commissioner for India in London.

Honorary Companion

- Shaikh Abdullah Bin Jabir As Sabah, of Kuwait.

=== Order of the Crown of India (CI) ===
- Her Highness Maharani Tara Devi, of Jammu and Kashmir State.

=== Royal Victorian Order ===
==== Dame Grand Cross of the Royal Victorian Order (GCVO) ====
- The Right Honourable Margaret, Dowager Baroness Ampthill, CI, GBE.

==== Knight Grand Cross of the Royal Victorian Order (GCVO) ====
- Sir Edward Ettingdene Bridges, GCB, MC.

==== Knight Commander of the Royal Victorian Order (KCVO) ====
- Thomas Innes of Learney.
- Colonel Dermot McMorrough Kavanagh, CVO.
- The Right Honourable William, Earl of Radnor.
- The Honourable Jasper Nicholas Ridley, OBE, TD, MA.

==== Commander of the Royal Victorian Order (CVO) ====
- The Reverend Canon Leonard Martin Andrews, MBE, MC.
- Anthony Bevir, CBE.
- The Reverend Cyril Leonard Cresswell, MA.
- Brigadier Norman Wilmshurst Gwatkin, DSO, MVO.
- Captain Edward Michael Conolly Abel Smith, Royal Navy.

==== Member of the Royal Victorian Order (MVO) ====
- Major Michael Edward Adeane, MA, Coldstream Guards.
- Bernard Percy Alton.
- Frank Hill.
- Miss Gertrude Elizabeth Jones.
- William Charles Hall.
- Walter John Newman.

=== Order of the British Empire ===
==== Dame Grand Cross of the Order of the British Empire (GBE) ====
Civil Division

- Clementine Churchill, CBE. For public services.
- Isobel, the Honourable Lady Cripps. For public services.

==== Knight Grand Cross of the Order of the British Empire (GBE) ====
Military Division

- Vice-Admiral Sir Henry Bernard Rawlings, KCB, KBE.

Civil Division

- The Right Honourable Robert, Baron Alness, LLD, DL, lately President and Chairman, Scottish Savings Committee.
- The Right Honourable Edward Mauger, Baron Iliffe, CBE, Chairman of HRH the Duke of Gloucester's Red Cross and St John Appeal Fund.
- Sir (William) Henry Peat, KBE, Financial Secretary, Ministry of Food.
- Sir Thomas Williams Phillips, KCB, KBE, Permanent Secretary, Ministry of National Insurance.
- Major-General Sir Hubert Jervoise Huddleston, KCMG, CB, DSO, MC, Governor-General of the Sudan.
- Nawab Sir Muhammad Ahmad Sa'id Khan, KCSI, KCIE, MBE, LLD, of Chhatari, President, His Exalted Highness the Nizam's Executive Council, Hyderabad, Deccan.

==== Dame Commander of the Order of the British Empire (DBE) ====
Military Division

- Air Chief Commandant Ruth Mary Eldridge, Lady Welsh, Women's Auxiliary Air Force.

==== Knight Commander of the Order of the British Empire (KBE) ====
Military Division

Royal Navy

- Vice-Admiral George Thomas Carlisle Parker Swabey, CB, DSO (Retd.)
- Vice-Admiral Robert Ross Turner, CB, DSO (Retd.)
- Vice-Admiral Henry Clarmont Phillips, CB (Retd.)
- Rear-Admiral Patrick Macnamara, CB, CBE (Retd.)
- Temporary Surgeon Rear-Admiral Cecil Pembrey Grey Wakeley, CB, DSc, FRCS, FACS, FRACS.

Army

- Lieutenant-General (temporary) Charles Walter Allfrey, CB, DSO, MC (5697), late Royal Regiment of Artillery.
- Major-General Alexander Gordon Biggam, CB, OBE, MD, FRCP (14900), late Royal Army Medical Corps, Honorary Physician to The King.
- Brigadier (local) Hugh William Bell Cairns, FRCS (135200), Royal Army Medical Corps.
- Major-General Edward Montagu Campbell Clarke, CB, CBE (3283), late Royal Regiment of Artillery.
- Major-General Arthur Arnhold Bullick Dowler, CB (8634), late The East Surrey Regiment.
- Major-General (temporary) Edward Ian Claud Jacob, CB, CBE, BA (15848), late Corps of Royal Engineers.
- Major-General Harold Reginald Kerr, CB, OBE, MC (17076), late Royal Army Service Corps.
- Lieutenant-General (local) Philip Neame, VC, CB, DSO (4243), late Corps of Royal Engineers Colonel Commandant, Royal Engineers.
- Major-General Leslie Gordon Phillips, CB, CBE, MC (4552), late Royal Corps of Signals.
- Major-General Eric Bertram Rowcroft, CB, CBE, MIMechE, MIEE (4585), late Royal Army Service Corps.
- Lieutenant-General (acting) James Stuart Steele, CB, DSO, MC (9429), late The Sherwood Foresters (Nottinghamshire and Derbyshire Regiment).

Royal Air Force

- Air Marshal Andrew Grant, CB, CBE, MB, ChB, DPH.
- Acting Air Marshal Albert Durston, CB, AFC.
- Acting Air Vice-Marshal John Josias Conybeare, MC, MD, FRCP, Royal Air Force Volunteer Reserve.

Civil Division

- Thomas James Cash, CB, Deputy Under-Secretary of State, War Office.
- Eric Norman De Normann, CB, Deputy Secretary, Ministry of Works.
- Sir Maurice Edward Denny, Bt, CBE, DL, lately President of the Air Registration Board.
- Sir William Palin Elderton, CBE, lately Chief Statistical Adviser, Ministry of Transport.
- John Claud Fortescue Fryer, OBE, Secretary, Agricultural Research Council.
- Percy Norman Harvey, CB, Government Actuary.
- Archibald Auldjo Jamieson, MC, Chairman of Vickers Ltd.
- Professor John Edward Lennard-Jones, PhD, DSc, FRS, Director-General of Scientific Research (Defence), Ministry of Supply.
- Geoffrey Stuart King, CB, MC, Secretary to the Assistance Board.
- The Right Honourable Kenneth Fitzgerald, Baron Kinnaird, LLD, Chairman, Scottish Branch, British Red Cross Society.
- The Honourable Joseph Paton Maclay, President of the Chamber of Shipping.
- Theobald Mathew, MC, Director of Public Prosecutions.
- Sir Percy Herbert Mills, President, Economic Sub-Commission, British Element, Control Commission for Germany.
- Harold Parker, CB, MC, Permanent Secretary, Ministry of Pensions.
- Edwin Noel Plowden, Chief Executive, Ministry of Aircraft Production.
- John Wilson Edington Miller, CMG, Financial Secretary, Sudan Government.
- Harry Chapman Sinderson, CMG, MVO, OBE, MD, FRCP(Ed), Dean of the Royal Faculty of Medicine, Baghdad.
- Giles Frederick Squire, CIE, Indian Political Service, His Majesty's Minister, Kabul.
- Sir John Robertson Abercrombie, MC, Chairman of Board of Administration, Canteen Stores Department, Canteen Services (India).
- Major General Herbert Ralph Hone, CBE, MC, Chief Civil Affairs Officer, Malaya.

==== Commander of the Order of the British Empire (CBE) ====
Military Division

Royal Navy

- Colonel Samuel John Bassett, Royal Marines (Retd.)
- Vice-Admiral Oliver Bevir, CB (Retd.)
- Acting Captain Ian Reddie Hamilton Black.
- Captain Stanley Napier Blackburn, (Retd.)
- Engineer Captain David Nicholas Hamilton Bowen, (Retd.)
- Superintendent The Most Honourable Sybil Rachel Betty Cécile, Marchioness of Cholmondeley, Women's Royal Naval Service.
- Acting Captain John Stewart Cowie.
- Commodore 2nd Class Henry Berwick Crane.
- The Reverend Irving Davies, Chaplain, (Retd.)
- Acting Captain Eric Guy Bohun de Mowbray, (Retd.)
- Rear-Admiral John Stewart Gordon Fraser, DSO (Retd.)
- Temporary Captain (Sp) Maxwell Gordon Gill, RNVR.
- Surgeon Rear-Admiral Cyril Verity Griffiths, CB, DSO, MRCS, LRCP, KHP.
- Captain (E) William Scarlett Jameson.
- Engineer Captain Augustus Gordon Jarrett, (Retd.)
- Commodore 2nd Class John Lawrence, OBE, Royal Indian Navy.
- Captain (S) Cecil Kingsley Lloyd, (Retd.)
- Acting Captain Charles Ernest Maconochie, OBE.
- Captain Barrington Lungley Moore.
- Captain (S) Reginald Douglas Paffard, (Retd.)
- Acting Rear-Admiral (S) Reginald Howard Pearce.
- Temporary Captain (Sp) Alan Pritchard, RNVR.
- Major General Arnold Hughes Eagleton Reading, Royal Marines.
- Acting Captain (S) John Theodore Shrimpton.
- Captain Joceleyn Latham Storey, DSO.
- Rear-Admiral George William Taylor (Retd.)
- Acting Captain Cowley Thomas, OBE, (Retd.)
- Temporary Commander Harry Vandervell, RNVR.
- Captain Edgar Clements Withers, Royal Indian Navy (Retd.)
- Surgeon Captain (D) James Thomson Wood.

Army

- Brigadier (temporary) James Robert Travers Aldous, MC (13510), late Corps of Royal Engineers.
- Colonel (temporary) Thomas Stephen James Anderson, OBE (70631), The Lincolnshire Regiment.
- Brigadier (temporary) Geoffrey Basil Bell (36293), Royal Corps of Signals.
- Brigadier (acting) Frank Robert Bloor, MBE, MC, MIMechE (6438), late Royal Electrical and Mechanical Engineers.
- Brigadier (temporary) Richard Hamilton Anstruther-Gough-Calthorpe, OBE, (47689), The Royal Scots Greys (2nd Dragoons), Royal Armoured Corps.
- Major-General (acting) Colin Campbell, MIMechE (20145), late Royal Electrical and Mechanical Engineers.
- Brigadier (temporary) Norman Murray Carstairs (5328), Indian Army.
- Brigadier (temporary) Gordon Henry Charlton, MC (11161), late Royal Army Pay Corps.
- Brigadier (acting) John Addison Russel Colam, OBE (717), Royal Regiment of Artillery.
- Brigadier (temporary) Thomas Frederick James Collins, OBE (30827), The Green Howards (Alexandra, Princess of Wales's Own Yorkshire Regiment).
- Colonel (temporary) Eric Guelph Cook, OBE (154221), The Sherwood Foresters (Nottinghamshire and Derbyshire Regiment).
- Major-General (local) Algernon Edward Cottam, OBE, MC (1889), The South Staffordshire Regiment.
- Brigadier (temporary) Bertram Upton Sinclair Cripps, MC (8848), late The Welch Regiment.
- Brigadier (temporary) Duncan Cameron Cumming, OBE (318184), General List.
- Colonel (acting) Geoffrey Peter Woodroffe Dunphie (37065), Royal Regiment of Artillery.
- Brigadier (local) Alfred John Edney (347), Corps of Royal Engineers.
- Brevet Lieutenant-Colonel John Feehally, OBE (35634), Royal Army Pay Corps.
- Colonel Roy Charles Whitworth George Firebrace (4358), late Royal Regiment of Artillery.
- Brigadier (temporary) Richard Gardiner, OBE (6835), Corps of Royal Engineers.
- Brigadier (temporary) Albert Thomas Robert Harris, Royal Indian Army Service Corps.
- Lieutenant-Colonel Antony Henry Head, MC, MP (36674), Life Guards.
- Brigadier (temporary) Killingworth Michael Fentham Hedges, DSO, OBE (1138), Royal Army Service Corps.
- Brigadier (temporary) Llewellyn Graham Owen Jenkins (13874), Royal Regiment of Artillery.
- Brigadier (temporary) Hayman John Hayman-Joyce, DSO (1399), late The Border Regiment.
- Brigadier (temporary) Frank Lane (35382), Corps of Royal Engineers.
- Colonel (temporary) Christopher Henry Erskine Lowther, MC (24157), Royal Army Ordnance Corps.
- Major-General (local) John Seymour Mellor, OBE, MC (48341), late The King's Royal Rifle Corps.
- Chief Principal Matron Jane Amelia Patterson, RRC (206371), Queen Alexandra's Imperial Military Nursing Service.
- Colonel (temporary) Malcolm Robert Russell Prentice (22031), Corps of Royal Engineers.
- Brigadier (acting) William Henry Ray, OBE (371), Corps of Royal Engineers.
- Brigadier (local) John Rawlings Rees, MD, FRCP (97060), Royal Army Medical Corps.
- Brigadier (temporary) George Arthur Sims, OBE, AMIMechE (5999), Royal Army Service Corps.
- Brigadier (temporary) Eric Keir Gilborne Sixsmith, MBE (30697), The Cameronians (Scottish Rifles).
- Major-General (acting) Harry Pratt Sparks, MC (10366), late The Suffolk Regiment.
- Colonel Henry Morrant Stanford, MC (1450), late Royal Regiment of Artillery.
- Brigadier (temporary) George Alexander Neville Swiney, OBE, MC (10754), Royal Army Ordnance Corps.
- Brigadier (temporary) William Bain Thomas, DSO (5430), The Cameronians (Scottish Rifles).
- Brigadier (temporary) Croxton Sillery Vale, MC (5737), late Royal Army Service Corps.
- Brigadier (temporary) Bendyshe Brome Walton (34295), The Royal Warwickshire Regiment.
- Brigadier (temporary) Bernard Springett Watkins (41992), Royal Corps of Signals.
- Brigadier (temporary) Dennis Henry Wickham (46160), The Queen's Royal Regiment (West Surrey).
- Matron-in-Chief Louisa Jane Wilkinson, OBE, RRC (206505), Queen Alexandra's Imperial Military Nursing Service.
- Brigadier (temporary) Harold Williams (11947), Corps of Royal Engineers.
- Controller Irene Charlotte Woods (192055), Auxiliary Territorial Service.

Royal Air Force

- Air Commodore Leonard Kelly Barnes, MBE.
- Air Commodore William Charles Cooper.
- Air Commodore Arthur Percy Ledger, MBE.
- Air Commodore Philip Clermonte Livingston, OBE, AFC, FRCS, FRCS(E), MRCS, LRCP, DPH, DOMS.
- Air Commodore Warneford Gerrard Wilkinson Prall.
- Air Commodore Francis Arthur Skoulding.
- The Reverend John Arthur Jagoe, MA, KHC.
- Acting Air Commodore Owen Washington De Putron.
- Acting Air Commodore Edward Demetrius Dalziel Dickson, MB, ChB, FRCS(E), DLO.
- Acting Air Commodore Richard Francis Osborne.
- Acting Air Commodore Valentine Beaconsfield Ranford.
- Acting Air Commodore Roland Eugene de Trevieres Vintras.
- Group Captain Charles Raymond Strathern Bradley, OBE.
- Group Captain Herbert Welstead Capener.
- Group Captain Alfred William Gray.
- Group Captain Walter Howard Hutton.
- Group Captain John Victor Mason, OBE.
- Group Captain Cyril Rapley.
- Group Captain Guy Neil Jacobson Stanley-Turner.
- Acting Group Captain Noel Thomas Goodwin, OBE, Royal Air Force Volunteer Reserve.
- Acting Group Captain Joseph Henry Green.
- Acting Group Captain Gerald Price Marvin, Reserve of Air Force Officers.
- Acting Group Captain Charles Lionel Stubbs, OBE, Royal Air Force Volunteer Reserve.
- Acting Group Captain Hugh Joseph Wilson, AFC.
- Wing Commander John Lindsay Barker, DFC, (34137), Reserve of Air Force Officers.
- Matron-in-Chief Gladys Taylor, RRC, Princess Mary's Royal Air Force Nursing Service.

Civil Division

- Leonard Aldridge, lately Additional Commissioner and Director-General Transportation & Storage, Bengal. For services in India and the Middle East.
- Kenneth Anderson, Assistant Secretary, India Office.
- Thomas George Symonds Babb, Chief Mechanical and Electrical Engineer, Air Ministry.
- John Edward Bacon, Chairman, Seeds Import Board.
- Ernest Edmond Bailey, PhD, lately Director General, Middle East Supply Centre.
- Arthur Richard Baines, Deputy Wool Controller, Board of Trade.
- Arthur Chantrey Baker, General Manager, Birmingham City Transport Department.
- Arnold Edward Banham, Secretary, Capital Issues Committee.
- Dingwall Latham Bateson, MC, Chairman, London Price Regulation Committee.
- James Batty, MBE, Senior Principal Inspector of Taxes, Board of Inland Revenue.
- Edward Bawden, War Artist.
- Harold Beeley, Employed in a department of the Foreign Office.
- Henry Alexander Benson, FCA, lately Housing Production Officer, Ministry of Health.
- John Benstead, General Secretary, National Union of Railwaymen.
- Violet Eveline Benyon, County President, Berkshire, British Red Cross Society.
- Samuel Berkeley, JP, Chairman, Belfast Coastal and Short Sea Shipping Control Committee, Ministry of Transport.
- Richard Elwyn Birch, JP, Chairman, Flintshire War Agricultural Executive Committee.
- Cyril Kenneth Bird (Fougasse), Artist. For services to the Ministry of Transport.
- Ronald Eric Bishop, Chief Designer, de Havilland Aircraft Company Ltd., Hatfield, Herts.
- Alfred Brown Ernest Blackburn, MInstCE, Engineer and General Manager and Director, Sunderland & South Shields Water Co.
- Herbert Vernon Bonar. For services as Jute Controller, Board of Trade.
- Robert Benedict Bourdillon, MC, AFC, DM, Director, Electro Medical Research Unit, Stoke Mandeville Hospital, Medical Research Council.
- Hugh Boyd, MBE, FCA. For services to the Government of Northern Ireland.
- Lieutenant-Colonel Albert Buckley, DSO, JP, Chairman, Liverpool Savings Committee.
- Walter Henry Budgett, MC, MInstCE, Divisional Road Engineer, Scotland, Ministry of Transport.
- Sir Richard Grant Woodman Burbidge, Bt, Member of the Board of Management, Navy, Army, & Air Force Institutes.
- Ernest William Bussey, General Secretary, Electrical Trades Union.
- Mungo Campbell, Lately Director, Ship Repair Division, Ministry of Transport.
- Richard Rylandes Costain. For services as Deputy Director of Works, Ministry of Works.
- Solomon Cutner, Pianist. For services to the Forces.
- William Aethelbert Damon, FRIC, Chief Inspector of Alkali Works, Ministry of Health.
- Captain Walter Dawson, Master, SS Tamaroa, Shaw Savill & Albion Co. Ltd.
- Joan Dowson, G.M., Croix de Guerre, SOE (late of Girton College, Cambridge)
- Professor Philip Ivor Dee, OBE, FRS, lately Superintendent, Telecommunications Research Establishment, Ministry of Aircraft Production.
- Jelly Eva Arányi De Hunyadvár, Violinist. For public services.
- Katharine, Mrs Walter Elliot, Chairman of the National Association of Girls' Clubs & Mixed Clubs and of the National Advisory Rest Breaks Committee.
- Charles Howard Ellis, OBE, employed in a department of the Foreign Office.
- James Ferguson, MB, ChB, DPH, lately County Medical Officer of Health, Surrey.
- Edwin Field, OBE, Assistant Secretary, Ministry of National Insurance.
- Captain Charles Musgrave Ford, RD, Royal Naval Reserve, Relieving Master, SS Queen Elizabeth, Cunard White Star Ltd.
- Eric Malcolm Fraser, lately Director-General of Aircraft Production, Ministry of Aircraft Production.
- Thomas Fraser, MIPE, Director, Metropolitan-Vickers Electrical Co. Ltd.
- Captain Barnett Freedman, Royal Marines, War Artist.
- William Kelsey Fry, MC, MRCS, LRCP, LDS, RCS, Dental Surgeon, Guy's Hospital.
- Robert Strachan Gardiner, FSI, FLAS, lately Secretary, Central Landowners' Association.
- Professor William Edward Garner, DSc, FRS, lately Chief Superintendent, Armament Research Department, Ministry of Supply.
- Major Alexander FitzMaurice Gilchrist, JP, Official Solicitor, Supreme Count of Judicature.
- Harold Edward Gorick, FCIS, lately Deputy Director, Coasting & Short Sea Division, Ministry of Transport, now Secretary, Chamber of Shipping of the United Kingdom.
- Albert William Grant, Chairman of the Engineering & Allied Employers' West of England Association.
- Mary Elizabeth Gray, OBE, Women's Voluntary Services Administrator in South-East Asia.
- John McDougal Russell Greig, PhD, MRCVS, Director of Moredun Institute, Animal Diseases Research Association.
- Harold Grinsted, OBE, Director of Technical Research & Development, Ministry of Aircraft Production.
- Geoffrey Menton Gullick, MIME. For services as Chief Mechanisation Adviser, Ministry of Fuel and Power.
- Alexander Gunn, MBE, Principal Assistant Secretary, Ministry of Labour and National Service.
- Joseph Arthur Hall, President, National Union of Mine Workers, Yorkshire Area.
- Ernest Edward Harper, Regional Director, Northern Ireland Region, General Post Office.
- James Maddin Harrison, Chairman, Candisco Ltd. For services to the Ministry of Food.
- Ernest George Hicks, MP, Member of Parliament for East Woolwich since 1931. Parliamentary Secretary, Ministry of Works, 1940–1945. For political and public services.
- Edward Ernest Hoadley, MIEE, Chief Engineer and Manager, Borough of Maidstone Electricity Department.
- Cecil Ernest Horton, Chief Scientist, Admiralty Signal Establishment.
- Major Thomas Jackson, OBE, Chairman of the War Committee, Church Army.
- Charles Jarman, Acting General Secretary of the National Union of Seamen.
- John Morgan Jones, Secretary, Welsh Department, Ministry of Agriculture & Fisheries.
- Joseph Joseph, MIEE, Managing Director, Aeronautical & General Instruments Ltd, Croydon.
- Richard Ferdinand Kahn, Principal Assistant Secretary, Board of Trade.
- Captain Alfred Gilmer Lamplugh, Underwriter and Principal Surveyor, British Aviation Insurance Co. Ltd.
- Major Robert Thomas Laughton, OBE, lately Managing Director, National Service Hostels Corporation Ltd.
- James Bruce Leask, OBE, lately Commercial Director, Middle East Office, United Kingdom Commercial Corporation.
- William Lemkin, lately Director of Clothing and Textiles, Ministry of Supply.
- Samuel Clement Leslie, lately Principal Assistant Secretary, Home Office.
- Wilfrid Bennett Lewis, PhD, FRS, for services as Superintendent, Telecommunications Research Establishment, Ministry of Aircraft Production.
- Lilian Lindsay, MDS, Honorary Librarian and President Elect of the British Dental Association.
- Professor Reginald Patrick Linstead, DSc, PhD, FRS, employed in a department of the Foreign Office.
- Stanley Eli Lovatt, OBE, lately Deputy Controller, HM Stationery Office.
- Leighton George Lowry, Principal Assistant Secretary, Ministry of Fuel and Power.
- Richard Edmund Relfe Luff, Managing Director, Cable & Wireless
- William Wither McClelland, Executive Officer, National Committee for the Training of Teachers.
- John Armour McGilvray, MBE, Assistant Secretary, Ministry of Agriculture & Fisheries.
- Neil Malcolm Maclean, JP, MP, Member of Parliament for the Govan division of Glasgow since 1918. Chairman of the Parliamentary Labour Party. For political and public services.
- Gilbert Matthews, Superintendent of the Line, Great Western Railway Company.
- Osborne Henry Mavor, MD, LLD, FRFPSG (James Bridie), Playwright. Chairman, Scottish Committee of the Arts Council.
- Frederick Montague, MP, Member of Parliament for West Islington, 1923–1931, and since 1935 Parliamentary Secretary, Ministry of Transport, 1940–1941 and Ministry of Aircraft Production, 1941–1942. For political and public services.
- William McArthur Morison, Director of Merchant, Shipbuilding & Repairs, Admiralty.
- David Herbert Nairne, Chief Engineer Officer, SS Circassia, Anchor Line Ltd.
- George Edgar Naylor, lately Regional Controller for the North Eastern Region, Board of Trade.
- Wilfred John Neden, Principal Assistant Secretary, Ministry of Labour and National Service.
- Alexander Nicoll, Chief Engineer Officer, SS Arundel Castle, Union-Castle Mail Steamship Co. Ltd.
- Albert Parker, DSc, FRIC, MIChemE, Director of Fuel Research, Department of Scientific & Industrial Research.
- Stanley Colston Parkin, General Manager, National Dock Labour Corporation Ltd.
- James Paton, JP, DL, Vice-Chairman, Agricultural Executive Committee for West Fife.
- Hubert Henry Payne, Chairman, Tea Distribution Section, Ministry of Food.
- Professor Egon Sharpe Pearson, DSc, Professor of Statistics, University College, London. Associate Member of the Ordnance Board.
- Colonel Herbert Raphe Power, OBE, MC. For services as Government Secretary, Guernsey.
- Richard Graham Prichard, OBE, Civil Engineer (Fortifications), War Office.
- Edward Albert Radice, Assistant Secretary, Foreign Office.
- William Richards, Ministry of Transport Representative on London and Newcastle Clubs (War Risks).
- Donald Charles Riddy, Controller-General, Education Branch, British Element, Control Commission for Germany.
- Lieutenant-Colonel William Robertson, VC, OBE, JP, Honorary Treasurer, British Legion, Scotland.
- Arthur Albert Rowse, MIME, MInstCE, MIAE, MIEE, Chairman, S G Brown Ltd.
- Eric Humphrey Savill, MVO, MC, Deputy Ranger, Windsor Great Park.
- Eric Wilfrid Scales, Secretary, Ministry of Health and Local Government, Northern Ireland.
- Herbert Schofield, MBE, PhD, Principal, Loughborough College.
- Herbert Arthur Short, MC, Docks and Marine Manager, Southern Railway Company.
- Frederick Cameron Sillar, Assistant Secretary, Imperial War Graves Commission.
- Captain Richard Thomas Smailes, Master, MV Athlone Castle, Union-Castle Mail Steamship Co. Ltd.
- Harry Watson-Smith, MInstCE, JP, Managing Director and Deputy Chairman, Hardwick Colliery Co. Ltd, Chesterfield.
- Captain James Alder Smith, Master, RMS Maloja, Peninsular and Oriental Steam Navigation Company.
- Tom Smith, MP, Member of Parliament for Pontefract, 1922–1924, 1929–1931 and for Normanton since 1933 Joint Parliamentary Secretary, Ministry of Fuel and Power, 1942–1945. For political and public services.
- Laurence Dudley Stamp, DSc, Chief Adviser on Rural Land Utilisation, Ministry of Agriculture & Fisheries.
- Major Percival Benjamin William Stanley, Regional Director, London Postal Region, General Post Office.
- George Kenneth Sutherland, HM Divisional Inspector of Schools, Ministry of Education.
- John Swanson, Chief Engineer Officer, SS Queen Elizabeth, Cunard White Star Ltd.
- Sydney Joseph Tatchell, FRIBA, Chairman of the Standards Committee, Ministry of Works, and of the Architects' Registration Council of the United Kingdom.
- Edward Wilfred Taylor, Joint Managing Director, Cooke, Troughton & Simms Ltd.
- Fanny Isabel Taylor, OBE, Senior Deputy Chief Inspector of Factories, Ministry of Labour and National Service.
- Colonel John Teague, OBE, MC, Employed in a department of the Foreign Office.
- Richard Noel Garrod-Thomas, Sulphuric Acid Controller, Board of Trade.
- Professor William Norman Thomas, DPhil, MInstCE, MIMechE, FRIBA, Professor of Engineering, University of Wales.
- Colonel Edward Guy Lethbridge Thurlow, DSO, Secretary, Territorial Army Association of the County of Berkshire.
- George Henry Trott, lately Director of Refrigerated Tonnage, Ministry of Food.
- James Philip Van den Bergh, Director of Margarine, Director of Dehydration, and Director of Fish Supplies, Ministry of Food.
- Thomas Walmsley, PhD, MInstCE, MIEE, Chief Radio Engineer, Air Ministry.
- Charles Reginald Wheeler, lately Controller of Iron and Steel, Ministry of Supply.
- Richard Whiddington, DSc, FRS, Cavendish Professor of Physics, University of Leeds. For services to Government Departments.
- Alfred Harold Wilson, Principal Assistant Secretary, Ministry of Civil Aviation.
- Thomas Wilton, House Coal Officer, South West Region, House Coal (Distribution) Emergency Scheme.
- Ernest Walter Wimble, Secretary and General Manager of the Workers' Travel Association.
- William Travis Winterbottom, Director of Yarn Planning, Cotton Control, Board of Trade.
- David Barkley Woodburn. For services as Principal Assistant Secretary, Ministry of Information.

- William Henry Braine. Labour Attaché at His Majesty's Embassy at Rome.
- Colonel Victor Henry Jaques, OBE, MC, Attached to the Staff of the Supreme Allied Commander, South East Asia.
- Rowland Kenney. Adviser to His Majesty's Embassy at Oslo.
- George Vernon Kitson. One of His Majesty's Consuls-General.
- John Marshall, OBE. For services to Cotton Buying Commissions in Egypt.
- Herbert Leonard Setchell, OBE, Counsellor (Commercial) at His Majesty's Legation at Stockholm.
- Frank Edmund Stafford, OBE, Financial Adviser to the Ethiopian Government, 1942–1944.
- Vincent Patrick Burke, OBE, LLD, Director of Adult Education, Newfoundland.
- Francis Gordon Byrne, Under-Secretary and Clerk of the Executive Council, State of South Australia.
- Francis Jackson Carter, JP, Assistant Under-Secretary and Assistant Clerk of the Executive Council, State of Tasmania.
- The Most Noble Mary Alice, Duchess of Devonshire, Chairman, Victoria League.
- Algernon Percival Findlay, OBE. For services in connection with philanthropic and patriotic movements in the State of Tasmania.
- John Roger Orr, OBE, Honorary Secretary of the Scottish Branch, Empire Societies War Hospitality Committee.
- Malcolm Arthur Fraser Pearce, Official Secretary to the Premier, Member of the State Bank Board, and Chairman of the Regional Planning Committee, State of South Australia.
- Augusta Maud, Lady Wallace, OBE, Honorary Secretary and Treasurer, Scottish Branch of the Victoria League, and Member of the Scottish Committee of the Empire Societies' War Hospitality Committee.
- Lieutenant-Colonel Hilda Mary Lazarus, MRCS, LRCP, FRCS(Ed), Chief Medical Officer, Women's Medical Service and Assistant Director-General, Indian Medical Service (Women's Branch).
- Lieutenant-Colonel (Temporary Brigadier) Albert William Homer Rea, OBE, AMIMechE, Indian Army, lately Director of Training, Labour Department, Government of India.
- James Owen Marsland, OBE, His Majesty's Honorary Vice-Consul at Pondicherry.
- Ajit Prashad Singh Deo, Zamindar and Chairman, Manbhum District Board, Bihar.
- Ian Gordon Kennedy, Chairman, Indian Jute Mills Association, Calcutta, Bengal.
- Robert Hesketh Martin, Manager, Forbes, Forbes, Campbell & Co., Karachi, Sind.
- Ratanshaw Ardeshir Nariman, MBE, Agent, Burmah Shell Petrol, Civil Lines, Bareilly, United Provinces.
- Harold Eric Ormerod, Honorary Cement Adviser to the Government of India, Department of Industries & Supplies.
- Honorary Lieutenant Khan Bahadur Malik Rab Nawaz Khan Tiwana, OBI, Landlord, Lyallpur, Punjab.
- Henry Richard Rishworth, OBE, FRCS, Principal Medical & Health Officer, Great Indian Peninsula Railway, Bombay.
- Almeric Hugh Seymour, Indian Civil Service, Burma.
- Thomas Haywood Baldwin, Colonial Education Service, Deputy Director of Education, Nigeria.
- Malcolm Pallister Barrow, OBE. For public services in Nyasaland.
- Charles Rudolph Campbell, Commissioner of Income Tax & Stamp Duties, Jamaica.
- John William Cox. For public services in Bermuda.
- Leonard Wynne Evans, MRCS, LRCP, Colonial Medical Service, Chief Medical Officer, Penang, Malaya. For services prior to and during the Japanese occupation.
- Thomas Maynard Hazlerigg, OBE, MC, Political Adviser, Hong Kong. For services in connection with the rehabilitation of the Colony.
- Herbert Arthur Lord, OBE, JP, Colonel, Salvation Army. For services during internment in Malaya.
- Major Hugh Kennedy McKee, MC. For public services in Northern Rhodesia.
- John Pennefather-Evans, Colonial Police Service, lately Commissioner of Police, Hong Kong. For services before and during hostilities.
- Norman Rae, Head of General Stores Department, The Crown Agents for the Colonies.
- William Jesse Oliff Reeves, Chief Engineer, Nigerian Railway.
- Joseph Oliver Reilly, Colonial Postal Service, Postmaster General, Gold Coast.
- Ernest Allen Smith, Deputy Director, Colonial Audit Department.
- Douglas James Valentine, MC, MB, BS, MRCS, LRCP, DPH, DTM&H, Colonial Medical Service, lately Deputy Director of Medical Services, Hong Kong. For services during internment.
- Harold John Webster, OBE, Accountant General, Kenya.
- Daniel Cottier Wilson. For public services in Ceylon.

Honorary Commanders

- Abdulkadiri, Emir of Ilorin, Nigeria.
- Shabetoy Levy, OBE, Chairman, Haifa Municipal Commission, Palestine.

==== Officer of the Order of the British Empire (OBE) ====
Military Division

Royal Navy

- Commander (E) Guy Wemyss Alcock.
- Acting Captain (E) William Brian Axford.
- Commander (E) Ian Gerald Aylen, DSC.
- Acting Commander (Sp) Ian Macdonald Bailey, RNVR.
- Temporary Acting Lieutenant-Commander Ronald Fitzgerald Barton Beesley, RNVR.
- Lieutenant-Colonel John Charles Owen Beynon, Royal Marines.
- Acting Commander Michael Anthony Ormus Biddulph, DSC.
- Lieutenant-Commander George Blackler.
- Acting Temporary Lieutenant-Commander William George Charles Blackwell, RNR.
- Acting Lieutenant-Commander George Bonney.
- Acting Commander (S) Patrick George Bowmen.
- Temporary Acting Lieutenant-Commander Harold Albert Prime Bullivant, RNR.
- The Reverend Canon Arnold Brian Burrowes, MA, Temporary Chaplain, RNVR.
- Commander Maurice Erdeswick Butler-Bowdon.
- Major George Proctor Carless, Royal Marines.
- Temporary Acting Commander Alex Henry Cherry, RNVR.
- Temporary Acting Commander (S) Dudley George Clark, RNVR.
- Acting Commander James Ernest Clark, DSC.
- Temporary Lieutenant-Commander (E) William John Coffee, RNR.
- Chief Officer Margaret Isabel Cooper, Women's Royal Indian Naval Service.
- Acting Lieutenant-Commander (A) Sidney Gratton Cooper.
- Acting Temporary Commander (Sp) Burton Scott Rivers Cope, RNVR.
- Acting Temporary Commander Alexander Corbett, RNR.
- Commander (S) Ivor Dummer, Royal Naval Reserve (Retd.)
- Commander Ivan Binstead Farrant, (Retd.)
- Temporary Major (Acting Temporary Lieutenant Colonel) Willis Farrier, Royal Marines.
- Commander Douglas Henry Fryer, (Retd.)
- Lieutenant-Commander Lycett Gardner, (Retd.)
- Temporary Acting Lieutenant-Commander Thomas Keith Garrard, DSC, RNR.
- Acting Commander Philip David Gick, DSC.
- Headmaster Commander Frederick John Giles.
- Commander James Gordon Gould.
- Lieutenant-Commander (S) Norman Steel Grant, DSC.
- Commander Cecil Ferdinand James Hammet, (Retd.)
- Commander (S) Eric Horace Harvey.
- Acting Commander Gilbert Nathaniel Harvey, BSc(Eng), AMIEE, (Retd.)
- Chief Officer Dorothy Alice Hesslegrave, WRNS.
- Commander (S) Cecil Stanhope Blair Hickman.
- Acting Commander Percival James Jordan, (Retd.)
- Commander Anthony Martin Kimmins, (Retd.)
- Commander Henry John Fullerton Lane.
- Acting Superintendent Mary Kathleen Lloyd, WRNS.
- Lieutenant-Commander John Mayling.
- Temporary Acting Lieutenant-Commander Henry Campbell McAusland, RNVR.
- Acting Surgeon Captain George McCoull, MD, BS, LRCP, LRCS, VD, RNVR.
- Commander Ralph Cyril Medley, DSO.
- Acting Lieutenant-Commander Herbert Tyson Middleton, (Retd.)
- Temporary Acting Lieutenant-Commander (E) Colin Campbell Mitchell, RNVR.
- Temporary Acting Commander John Sale Mulock, RNVR.
- Acting Temporary Lieutenant-Commander George John Norris, RNVR.
- Acting Lieutenant Colonel (Major) Robert Miles Porter, Royal Marines.
- The Reverend Hugh James Purves, Chaplain.
- Acting Commander Gerald Pollexfen Maxwell Radcliffe, (Retd.)
- Chief Officer Nancy Margaret Robertson, WRNS.
- Temporary Acting Lieutenant-Commander Stephen Frank Rothon, RNVR.
- Lieutenant-Commander (S) Harry Stephen Rousseau, RNR.
- Temporary Acting Lieutenant-Commander Henry Robert Lee Rushbrooke, RNVR.
- Lieutenant-Colonel Frederick Russell, Royal Marines.
- Engineer-Commander Sydney John Russell, (Retd.)
- Chief Officer Betty Samuel, WRNS.
- Lieutenant-Commander Henry Bruff Shaw, Royal Naval Reserve (Retd.)
- Lieutenant-Colonel Frederick George Sillitoe, Royal Marines (Retd.)
- Commander (L) Gordon Maxwell Edward Speedy.
- Acting Commander Ernest Charles Stephens, RD, RNR.
- Temporary Acting Lieutenant-Commander (S) Douglas Edward Stevens, RNVR.
- Chief Officer Stella Mary Stuart-Thompson, WRNS.
- Acting Commander Robert William Sumpton, RD, Royal Naval Reserve (Retd.)
- Lieutenant-Commander James Denis Sutcliffe.
- Acting Commander Robert Basil Stewart Tennant.
- Surgeon Commander Edward Gwynne Thomas, VD, MD, BS, MRCP, RNVR.
- Temporary Acting Surgeon Lieutenant-Commander David Alexander Thomson, RNVR.
- Acting Commander Harold Aubrey Tod, Royal Indian Naval Reserve.
- Commander Frederick Stanley Walford.
- Acting Commander (Sp) George Elliot Walker, Royal Indian Naval Volunteer Reserve.
- Lieutenant-Commander Bernard Ralph Henry Ward.
- Instructor Lieutenant-Commander William Harold Watts, BEng.
- The Reverend Alan William Martin Watson, BA, Chaplain.
- Surgeon Commander (D) Frank Reginald Parry Williams, BDS.
- Acting Commander Alan Oliver Wills, RNVR.
- Lieutenant-Commander (S) Cyril Branston Wood, (Retd.)
- Temporary Acting Lieutenant-Commander (E) William Heslop Woolnough, RNVR.

Army

- Major-General Abdul Rahman Khan Chib, Bahadur OBI, MBE, Alwar State Forces, Indian States Forces.
- Colonel (temporary) William Godfrey Abinett (17878), Royal Regiment of Artillery.
- Brigadier (temporary) Peter Bevie Edward Acland, MC (25997), Royal Regiment of Artillery.
- Lieutenant-Colonel (temporary) Ernest Haik Riddall Altounyan, MC (136796), General List.
- Colonel (temporary) James Norman Dalrymple Anderson, MBE (144599), Intelligence Corps.
- Lieutenant-Colonel (temporary) Henry Andrews (85034), Pioneer Corps.
- Lieutenant-Colonel (temporary) Noel Gavin Annan (162703), Intelligence Corps.
- Lieutenant-Colonel (temporary) George Fortnam Appleton (58817), The King's Regiment (Liverpool).
- Lieutenant-Colonel (temporary) William Robert Armstrong (M.E.C.12715), Indian Electrical and Mechanical Engineers.
- Brigadier (temporary) Harry William Hugh Armytage, MC (15047), late Royal Regiment of Artillery.
- Lieutenant-Colonel (temporary) Harold Ernest Edwin Ault (34053), Grenadier Guards.
- Lieutenant-Colonel (temporary) Stephen Craine Goulden Bach, 5th Mahratta Light Infantry, Indian Army.
- Lieutenant-Colonel (temporary) Henry Backhouse (2158), Royal Regiment of Artillery.
- Brigadier (temporary) George Alexander Bain (I.A.70), Indian Army.
- Colonel (temporary) Hugh Baird (45586), Royal Army Ordnance Corps.
- Chief Commander Gladys Baker (192369), Auxiliary Territorial Service.
- Colonel (temporary) George Barnett, MC (1270), Royal Army Veterinary Corps.
- Colonel (temporary) Richard Thomas Barr, MBE, AMIMechE (101144), Electrical and Mechanical Engineers.
- Brigadier (acting) Victor George Joseph Barton (I.A.874), 6th Rajputana Rifles, Indian Army.
- Lieutenant-Colonel (temporary) Rajinder Nath Batra (I.C.466), Indian Signal Corps.
- The Reverend Gerald William Battersby, BA, BD (76653), Chaplain to the Forces, 2nd Class (temporary), Royal Army Chaplains' Department.
- Lieutenant-Colonel Charles William Beart, MC (8383), The Durham Light Infantry.
- Colonel (temporary) William Donald Haldane Beyts, AMIEE (22033), Corps of Royal Engineers.
- Colonel (temporary) Maurice Henry Townsend Bickers (E.C.13439), Indian Engineers (Army Postal Services).
- Lieutenant-Colonel Robert Albert Glanville Bingley, DSO (24309), 11th Hussars (Prince Albert's Own), Royal Armoured Corps.
- Lieutenant-Colonel (temporary) Henry Loraine Wilberforce Bird (23607), The Gloucestershire Regiment.
- Lieutenant-Colonel (temporary) John Thomas Blenkinship (95410), Royal Regiment of Artillery.
- Colonel (temporary) Thomas Whicher Boileau (30810), Royal Corps of Signals.
- Major (Commissary) John Stacey Bolton, MBE, Indian Miscellaneous List.
- Colonel (acting) Francis Charles Booty (I.A.10), 8th Punjab Regiment, Indian Army.
- Lieutenant-Colonel (temporary) James Candler Bowering (57639), Royal Electrical and Mechanical Engineers.
- Lieutenant-Colonel (temporary) Charles Hedley Briggs (101874), Royal Army Ordnance Corps.
- Brigadier (temporary) Victor Frederick Browne, MC (22587), Royal Regiment of Artillery.
- Lieutenant-Colonel George William Browning (888), Welsh Guards.
- Lieutenant-Colonel (temporary) Brayan William Cave-Brown-Cave (130603), The Royal Northumberland Fusiliers.
- Lieutenant-Colonel (temporary) The Honourable Martin Michael Charles Charteris (56721), The King's Royal Rifle Corps.
- Lieutenant-Colonel (temporary) Henry Kingston Christian (79000), Royal Regiment of Artillery.
- Lieutenant-Colonel (temporary) Arthur Kenneth Clark (140012), The Middlesex Regiment (Duke of Cambridge's Own).
- Lieutenant-Colonel (temporary) Thomas Welborne Clark (R.O.9086), Intelligence Corps (India).
- Lieutenant-Colonel (temporary) Alan Courtenay Clarice (53248), The Bedfordshire and Hertfordshire Regiment.
- Colonel (temporary) Frank Dennis Clarke, MC (I.A.279), 8th Gurkha Rifles, Indian Army.
- Lieutenant-Colonel (temporary) Francis William Norton Collingwood, MBE (10958), The Duke of Cornwall's Light Infantry.
- Lieutenant-Colonel (temporary) Patrick Haddon Harvey Combe, MC (90952), 3rd The King's Own Hussars, Royal Armoured Corps.
- Lieutenant-Colonel (temporary) John Robert Corlett (163260), Royal Army Ordnance Corps.
- Lieutenant-Colonel (temporary) Henry Edward Mariano Cotton, BA (36461), Corps of Royal Engineers.
- Lieutenant-Colonel (temporary) Nigel Smart Cowan, BSc (58563), Corps of Royal Engineers.
- Lieutenant-Colonel Anthony William Cowper (105244), The West Yorkshire Regiment (The Prince of Wales's Own).
- Lieutenant-Colonel (temporary) Ian Archibald Forbes Craig (E.C.1726), Hodson's Horse, Indian Armoured Corps.
- Major John Crawford (E.C.2364), Indian Engineers.
- Lieutenant-Colonel Terence Claude Crichton, MC (I.A.45), 3rd Cavalry, Indian Cavalry.
- Colonel (temporary) Fred Thomas Russell Darley (18851), The Leicestershire Regiment.
- Lieutenant-Colonel (temporary) Kenneth Thomas Darling, DSO (44052), The Royal Fusiliers (City of London Regiment).
- Colonel (temporary) Jack Gale Wilmot Davies (174747), The Middlesex Regiment (Duke of Cambridge's Own).
- Lieutenant-Colonel (temporary) Hubert Henry Thomas Davis (146888), The Royal Welch Fusiliers.
- Lieutenant-Colonel James Vere Denning, MC (2583), late Corps of Royal Engineers.
- Lieutenant-Colonel (temporary) Frederick Gordon Deveney, DCM (67306), Corps of Royal Engineers.
- Lieutenant-Colonel (temporary) David William Alexander Donald (78274), The Black Watch (Royal Highland Regiment).
- Lieutenant-Colonel (local) Lawrie Hibbert Drabble (20068), Royal Regiment of Artillery.
- Colonel (temporary) Lancelot Crofts East, DSO (19819), The Queen's Royal Regiment (West Surrey).
- Lieutenant-Colonel Hugh Herbert Heathfield Eliott (37181), The Royal Fusiliers (City of London Regiment)
- The Reverend David Douglas Lloyd Evans (62900), Chaplain to the Forces, 1st Class (acting), Royal Army Chaplains' Department.
- Lieutenant-Colonel (temporary) Trevor George Corry Evans (97144), The Royal Sussex Regiment.
- Lieutenant-Colonel (temporary) Robert Kenah Exham, MC (36543), The Duke of Wellington's Regiment (West Riding).
- Colonel (temporary) Joseph Thomas Field (4943), Royal Army Service Corps.
- Colonel (temporary) Leslie Gibson Forster (I.A.119), 3rd Queen Alexandra's Own Gurkha Rifles, Indian Army.
- Colonel (acting) Alan Alfred Forward (127493), Royal Army Service Corps. Controller, Road Transport, Malaya Union.
- Colonel (temporary) William Geoffrey Stanley Foster (37601), Royal Army Medical Corps.
- Lieutenant-Colonel (temporary) Henry John Sawyer French (129166), Royal Regiment of Artillery.
- Lieutenant-Colonel William Marmaduke Gayer (15200), Royal Regiment of Artillery.
- Lieutenant-Colonel (temporary) Eric John Gough (184573), The Oxfordshire and Buckinghamshire Light Infantry.
- Lieutenant-Colonel Cecil Hay Gurney (12040), The King's Royal Rifle Corps.
- Colonel (acting) Leonard Alan Hall (46193), Corps of Royal Engineers.
- Lieutenant-Colonel (temporary) Alexander Patrick Cathcart Hannay, MC (15268), The Queen's Own Cameron Highlanders.
- Lieutenant-Colonel (local) Walter Gordon Harmon (254454), Intelligence Corps.
- Lieutenant-Colonel (temporary) Archibald Percy Harrington, MBE (126060), Royal Regiment of Artillery.
- Lieutenant-Colonel (temporary) George Hewetson, DSO (74257), Army Air Corps.
- Colonel (temporary) Cornelius John Keating Hill (22887), Royal Army Pay Corps.
- Brigadier (acting) John Mervyn Hobbs, MC (I.A.170), 4th Prince of Wales's Own Gurkha Rifles, Indian Army.
- Lieutenant-Colonel (temporary) Charles Henry Hoskyn, MB (122017), Royal Army Medical Corps.
- Lieutenant-Colonel (temporary) Leslie George Hucks (106349), Royal Army Service Corps.
- Colonel (acting) Robert George Hyde (I.A.137), 17th Dogra Regiment, Indian Army.
- Brevet Lieutenant-Colonel William Rudolph Vernon Isaac, MBE, MC (14259), Extra Regimentally Employed List.
- Chief Commander Catherine Helen Margaret Jackson (236968), Auxiliary Territorial Service.
- Lieutenant-Colonel (temporary) Edwin Burton Jenkin (103583), Royal Corps of Signals.
- Lieutenant-Colonel (temporary) Harold Paget Evans Jones (13605), The Duke of Cornwall's Light Infantry.
- Colonel (temporary) John Leonard Jones (111094), Pioneer Corps.
- Lieutenant-Colonel (acting) Louis Francois Joubert (251263), Union Defence Force.
- Lieutenant-Colonel (temporary) Nowshir Jungalwalla, MB, BS, MRCS, MRCP (MZ.18459), Indian Army Medical Corps.
- Lieutenant-Colonel Cuthbert Alfred Garrett Cuthbert Keeson, MC, TD (16505), The King's Royal Rifle Corps.
- Lieutenant-Colonel (temporary) Khan Bahadur Sorab Gustadji Khambata (I.E.C.704), Indian Engineers (Army Postal Services).
- Lieutenant-Colonel (temporary) Khuda Baksh (E.C.8535), 2nd Jammu and Kashmir Rifles, Indian States Forces.
- Lieutenant-Colonel George Milne Kinmont (18443), Scots Guards.
- Lieutenant-Colonel (temporary) William Lacey, MBE, AMIMechE (E.C.10665), Indian Army Ordnance Corps.
- Colonel (temporary) Guy de Laval Landon, MC (5141), Royal Regiment of Artillery.
- Colonel (temporary) Francis Wilkinson Latham (I.A.667), Indian Electrical and Mechanical Engineers.
- Brigadier (temporary) Hetherington Long, MC (28097), The Royal Norfolk Regiment.
- Lieutenant-Colonel (temporary) Peter John Luard, DSO (49882), The Oxfordshire and Buckinghamshire Light Infantry.
- Lieutenant-Colonel (temporary) Alexander Dougal Malcolm (75932), The Argyll and Sutherland Highlanders (Princess Louise's).
- Colonel (temporary) John Manby (I.A.248), 7th Gurkha Rifles, Indian Army.
- Brigadier (acting) Geoffrey Cullen Marsh (70724), The Manchester Regiment.
- Lieutenant-Colonel (temporary) Richard Otto St George Marshall (47751), Corps of Royal Engineers.
- Chief Commander Marjorie Frances Gabrielle Maynard (192460), Auxiliary Territorial Service.
- Lieutenant-Colonel Henry Guy Beckley Milling (22951), Royal Army Pay Corps.
- Colonel (temporary) Farrar Robert Horton Morgan, DSO (14595), The Border Regiment.
- Lieutenant-Colonel Leonard Francis Morling, DSO, TD (28396), Corps of Royal Engineers.
- Lieutenant-Colonel (temporary) Archibald John Rowcliffe Munro (9358), Royal Regiment of Artillery.
- Major (temporary) Desmond Henry Murphy (68594), Royal Regiment of Artillery.
- Lieutenant-Colonel (temporary) Anton M. Muthukumaru (77), The Ceylon Light Infantry.
- The Reverend Mathew Joseph O'Carroll (50253), Chaplain to the Forces, 1st Class, Royal Army Chaplains' Department.
- Colonel (temporary) Kenneth Heathcote Osborne, DSO, MC (70821), Corps of Royal Engineers.
- Lieutenant-Colonel (temporary) Lionel Russel Osborne (156938), The Essex Regiment.
- Lieutenant-Colonel (temporary) Dudley Noble Papworth (264376), Pioneer Corps.
- Lieutenant-Colonel (temporary) Leslie Charles Parish (68758), Corps of Royal Engineers.
- Colonel (acting) John Russell Paterson, DL (280754), Army Cadet Force.
- Lieutenant-Colonel (temporary) Colin Francis Bowring Paul (153731), Royal Army Ordnance Corps.
- Lieutenant-Colonel (temporary) Alex Duncan Campbell Peterson (191017) General List.
- Colonel (acting) Richard Gilmour Philips (24985), The Devonshire Regiment.
- Colonel (temporary) Geoffrey Howard Plummer, MC (I.A.6788), Indian Signal Corps.
- Major (temporary) Ivor Forsyth Porter (297747), General List.
- Lieutenant-Colonel Leon Graham Bento Powell, MM, lately Commandant, Bermuda Home Guard.
- Colonel (temporary) Ronald William Raven, FRCS (218890), Royal Army Medical Corps.
- Lieutenant-Colonel (temporary) William Power Reed (26996), Corps of Royal Engineers.
- Lieutenant-Colonel (temporary) Gavin Ralston Reekie (150960), Royal Electrical and Mechanical Engineers.
- Major John George Ferrier Robb, MC, TD (22716), Intelligence Corps.
- Lieutenant-Colonel (temporary) Archibald Maxwell Robertson, MB (63917), Royal Army Medical Corps.
- Colonel (temporary) Anthony James Duncan Rose (15862), The Buffs (Royal East Kent Regiment).
- Colonel (temporary) Ajit Anil Rudra, 15th Punjab Regiment, Indian Army.
- The Reverend Frank Victor Schembry (11334), Chaplain to the Forces, 4th Class, Indian Ecclesiastical Establishment.
- Lieutenant-Colonel (temporary) Gustavus Haydon Searle (53640), Indian Artillery.
- Colonel (temporary) William Guy Shacklock (27944), Royal Regiment of Artillery.
- Colonel (acting) John Veysie Montgomery Shields (137005), The Argyll and Sutherland Highlanders (Princess Louise's).
- Lieutenant-Colonel (temporary) John Field Field-Smith (87258), Corps of Royal Engineers.
- Lieutenant-Colonel (temporary) Roland William Smith (152183), Pioneer Corps.
- Lieutenant-Colonel (temporary) Robert Wilmot Sorsbie (27004), Royal Regiment of Artillery.
- Lieutenant-Colonel (temporary) John Hanbury Angus Sparrow (130081), Coldstream Guards.
- Lieutenant-Colonel Arthur Heneage Stafford, ED, Senior Staff Officer at Administrative Headquarters, Fiji Military Forces.
- Lieutenant-Colonel (temporary) Hugh Percival Stephenson (127361), The East Yorkshire Regiment (The Duke of York's Own).
- Lieutenant-Colonel (local) George Roy Stevens (E.C.14040), 6th Rajputana Rifles, Indian Army.
- Lieutenant-Colonel (acting) Charles Drummond Stevenson (94159), Corps of Royal Engineers.
- Lieutenant-Colonel (temporary) Frederick Lewis Stroud (13386), Corps of Royal Engineers.
- Lieutenant-Colonel Eric Eyre Sullivan-Tailyour, MC (8604), The Sherwood Foresters (Nottinghamshire and Derbyshire Regiment).
- Major Harold Charles Harker Taylor, MBE (32185), Royal Army Pay Corps.
- Lieutenant-Colonel (temporary) William John Kirwan-Taylor (162698), The Rifle Brigade (Prince Consort's Own).
- Lieutenant-Colonel (temporary) Henry James Tedder (36890), The Royal Warwickshire Regiment.
- Lieutenant-Colonel (temporary) Charles Holwell Thomas (E.C.784), The Guides Cavalry, Indian Army.
- Lieutenant-Colonel (temporary) Clifford Thomas (E.C.4361), Indian Engineers.
- Colonel (temporary) Chadwick Eckersley Thompson (I.A.813), Indian Army.
- Lieutenant-Colonel (temporary) Arthur Edward Turk, MBE, TD (46238), Royal Regiment of Artillery.
- Lieutenant-Colonel (temporary) Cecil John Valentine (199611), General List, Infantry.
- Lieutenant-Colonel (temporary) Charles Edward Vaughan, MBE (142142), The Buffs (Royal East Kent Regiment).
- Lieutenant-Colonel (temporary) Ulick Otway Vortigern Verney (17775), The Rifle Brigade (Prince Consort's Own).
- Lieutenant-Colonel (temporary) Arthur William Neville Langston Vickers (62638), The King's Own Yorkshire Light Infantry.
- Lieutenant-Colonel George St Vigor John Vigor (18838), Welsh Guards.
- Colonel (acting) Laban Edwin Vine, MRCS, LRCP, MB, BS, FRFPS, FRCS (225581), Royal Army Medical Corps, Malayan Medical Service.
- Lieutenant-Colonel (temporary) Francis Ernest Waldren (7545), 9th Jat Regiment, Indian Army.
- Colonel (local) Frederick Charles Wall (I.A.843), Royal Indian Army Service Corps.
- Lieutenant-Colonel (temporary) Harry Freeman Walthew (12733), The Hertfordshire Regiment, Territorial Army.
- Controller Francis Violet Dorothea Warren (W.A.C.96), Women's Auxiliary Corps (India).
- Colonel (temporary) Reginald Lionel Warren (159637), Corps of Royal Engineers.
- Lieutenant-Colonel (temporary) Harold Claude Watkins, MC (33390), The Royal Welch Fusiliers.
- Lieutenant-Colonel (temporary) Archibald James Simpson Watson (99234), Royal Electrical and Mechanical Engineers.
- Lieutenant-Colonel (temporary) Cecil Richard Watson (10163), Special List of Quartermasters of the Indian Army.
- Lieutenant-Colonel (temporary) Raymond Stewart Weightman (73852), Royal Regiment of Artillery.
- Lieutenant-Colonel (temporary) Gordon Wellesley Wellington (118190), Corps of Royal Engineers.
- Lieutenant-Colonel (local) Maurice Frank Gerard Wentworth, MBE (70984), General List.
- Lieutenant-Colonel (temporary) Ernest Archibald Wheeler (88604), Royal Army Ordnance Corps.
- Lieutenant-Colonel (temporary) Ernest Horace White, MBE, Indian Army.
- Brigadier (temporary) John Wickham (A.I.564), 14th Punjab Regiment, Indian Army.
- Lieutenant-Colonel (temporary) Charles Leslie Wicks (32374), Royal Corps of Signals.
- Colonel (acting) Thomas Charles Maxwell Wigg (E.C.1982), Indian Engineers.
- Lieutenant-Colonel (temporary) Albert Humphrey Williams, DSO (51336), The Royal Welch Fusiliers.
- Lieutenant-Colonel (temporary) Edward Alexander Wilmott Williams, MC (47677), The King's Royal Rifle Corps.
- Lieutenant-Colonel (temporary) Frank Richard Wilson (4171), Indian Army.
- Lieutenant-Colonel (temporary) Thomas Hugh Winterborn (44188), Royal Corps of Signals.
- Lieutenant-Colonel James Austen Woodgate, Officer Commanding, Falkland Islands Defence Force.
- Major (temporary) Arthur Cecil Woods, MBE (E.C.533), Indian Army.
- Lieutenant-Colonel Edward Franklin Laborde Wright (103635), The Rifle Brigade (Prince Consort's Own).
- Lieutenant-Colonel (temporary) Thomas Young, AMIEE (188552), Royal Electrical and Mechanical Engineers.

Royal Air Force

- Group Captain Norman Cyril Odbert.
- Group Captain Taylor Coombs Shore, Royal Canadian Air Force.
- Acting Group Captain Robert Algernon Rokeby Coote-Robinson.
- Acting Group Captain Victor Charles Darling.
- Acting Group Captain Alexander John Dow, RAFVR.
- Acting Group Captain Peter Henry Gibbings, Reserve of Air Force Officers.
- Acting Group Captain Frederick Charles Gillman, RAFVR.
- Acting Group Captain Frank Gomersall.
- Acting Group Captain Clifford Hartley.
- Acting Group Captain Noel Mervyn Heath, Royal Australian Air Force.
- Acting Group Captain Isaac Hodgson.
- Acting Group Captain Pierce McDiarmid, AFM.
- Acting Group Captain Patrick Brunton Lee Potter, MD, ChB, DPH, DTM&H.
- Acting Group Captain Cecil George Prior.
- Acting Group Captain Ernest Leslie Jack Rowe, RAFO.
- Acting Group Captain George Holford White.
- Wing Commander Frederick Charles Clarke (45171).
- Wing Commander Richard Michael Craig (41113).
- Wing Commander Michael Dorrington Day (39413).
- Wing Commander Arthur Llewellyn Derry (21154).
- Wing Commander Herbert Hawkins (31179).
- Wing Commander Harry Kershaw (75507), RAFVR.
- Wing Commander Gordon Cooper Oliff Key, DFC (37815).
- Wing Commander Arthur Paton (31483).
- Wing Commander Richard Stewart Sweet (21173).
- Acting Wing Commander Hubert Edward Joshua Acfield (21225).
- Acting Wing Commander Edward Leslie Thomas Barton (85191), RAFVR.
- Acting Wing Commander Fenton Braithwaite (109104), RAFVR.
- Acting Wing Commander Robert Lauret Carroll Branson (39369).
- Acting Wing Commander Cresswell Montague Clementi (72465).
- Acting Wing Commander Frederick Percy Cotterell (35320).
- Acting Wing Commander John Charles Cotton (81472), RAFVR.
- Acting Wing Commander Wilfred Henry Flint (40101), RAFO.
- Acting Wing Commander Charles Joseph Thomas Gardner (85952), RAFVR.
- Acting Wing Commander Ronald George Greaves (81707), RAFVR.
- Acting Wing Commander Percival Griffiths (21199).
- Acting Wing Commander John Hutton (85409), RAFVR.
- Acting Wing Commander Robert McLean (100720), RAFVR.
- Acting Wing Commander Samuel Muir (43495).
- Acting Wing Commander Victor Charles Otter (44999).
- Acting Wing Commander Ernest Gordon Parry (21257).
- Acting Wing Commander Frank William Thomas Pryer (44036).
- Acting Wing Commander George William Sawkins (43756).
- Acting Wing Commander Frederick St Leger Searl (139017), RAFVR.
- Acting Wing Commander George Albert Saxon Watts (83609), RAFVR.
- Squadron Leader Arthur Hilton Day, DFC (74469).
- Squadron Leader John Bowen McKay (80853), RAFVR.
- Squadron Leader Harry Vivian Pexton (75025), RAFVR.
- Acting Squadron Leader Walter Warne Atkinson (130084), RAFVR.
- Acting Squadron Leader Leonard Suttie Chalmers (106260), RAFVR.
- Acting Squadron Leader John Sim Orr (44743).
- Acting Squadron Leader John Frederick Parsons (83130), RAFVR.
- Acting Squadron Leader Geoffrey Francis Rogers (44249).
- Acting Squadron Leader James Arthur Stanbrook (73408), RAFVR.
- Acting Squadron Leader James Leslie Warburton (104062), RAFVR.
- Acting Squadron Leader Frank Howard Whitaker (62480), RAFVR.
- Acting Squadron Leader Gwilym Trevor Williams, DFM (48736).

Civil Division

- Geoffrey William Aldington. Acting British Consul-General in China.
- Clement Barber. For services to the Cotton Buying Commissions in Egypt.
- Arthur Warden-Baker, MC, His Majesty's Consul at Piraeus.
- Commander Salvador Augustus Gomez-Beare, Royal Navy, Assistant Naval Attaché at His Majesty's Embassy at Madrid.
- George Henry Bolsover. A member of the staff of His Majesty's Embassy at Moscow.
- Salvatore Cremona, MBE.
- David Revel Dick. Press Attaché at His Majesty's Embassy at Santiago.
- George D'Arcy Edmondson. Controller of the British Information Services, USA.
- Henry Norman Somerville Fearon. Chief Inspecting Engineer, Sudan Government.
- Charles Henry Pearson Gifford. Until recently First Secretary (Commercial) at His Majesty's Embassy at Moscow.
- Ernest Stephen Hawkins. British subject resident in Iraq.
- Michael Bernard Hunter. Adviser to the Ministry of Posts & Telegraphs, Kabul.
- Lieutenant-Colonel Anthony Colin Kendall. A member of the staff of the British Political Mission, Bucharest.
- Henry Lawrence Littler. British Council Representative in Ethiopia.
- Major John Gilbert Lockhart, First Secretary at His Majesty's Embassy at Washington.
- Norman Longe. British subject resident in Venezuela.
- John Barrington Lynham. Representative of British American Tobacco Co. in the Belgian Congo.
- Major Cyril Berkeley Ormerod, British Information Services, USA.
- Norman Stanley Roberts, MBE, First Secretary (Commercial) at Tehran.
- Wing Commander (Acting Air Commodore) the Honourable Walter Leslie Runciman, AFC, Air Attaché at His Majesty's Embassy at Tehran.
- Edgar Stanley Sage. British Vice-Consul at Porto Alegre.
- Harry Stenbock. First Secretary and Head of the Consular Section at His Majesty's Embassy at Belgrade.
- Roy Tristram. Press Attaché at His Majesty's Embassy at Angora.
- Gordon Coligny Whitteridge. One of His Majesty's Consuls-General.
- Sydney George Wraight. British subject resident in Egypt.
- Albert Edward Boyton, lately Additional Magistrate, Bulawayo, Southern Rhodesia.
- The Reverend Ezra Broughton, a member of the United Church, Newfoundland. For social welfare services in Newfoundland and Labrador.
- Eric Valentine Chapman. For public and philanthropic services in the State of Tasmania.
- Kenneth Henry Dyke, MB, ChB, Director of Medical Services, Basutoland.
- Colonel Godfrey Power Geddes, DSO, TD, Chairman of the Aberdeen Committee, Empire Societies War Hospitality Committee.
- William Ayliff Godlonton. For public services in Southern Rhodesia.
- James Smith Hall Grant, MInstT, FRGS, Chairman of the Railway Commission, Southern Rhodesia.
- Reginald Theodore Kleeman. For services in connection with patriotic and charitable movements in Whyalla, State of South Australia.
- Augusta Drever Fleming Leishman, MBE, Hospitality Secretary, Victoria League, Edinburgh.
- Percival James Lewis, JP, Member of the Swaziland Advisory Council.
- Benjamin Lightfoot, MC, FGS, Director of Geological Survey, Southern Rhodesia.
- Chieftainess 'Mantšebo Seeiso, Regent of Basutoland, in recognition of the war effort of the Basuto Nation.
- Brian Alan Marwick, District Officer, Swaziland.
- John Reginald Hugh Shaul, MSc(Econ), FSS, Government Statistician, Southern Rhodesia.
- Frederick Smithies, JP, of Launceston, State of Tasmania, an authority on the flora and fauna of that State.
- Lieutenant-Colonel Herbert Frederick Montagu Surgey, Assistant Commissioner, British South Africa Police.
- Jtiarry Davis Sutherns, lately Chief Education Officer, Southern Rhodesia.
- Dorothy Marie Gladys Thompson, MBE, Organizing Secretary, Empire Societies War Hospitality Committee.
- George Thomas Watson, JP, Chairman of the Officers' Club, Dundee, under the auspices of the Empire Societies War Hospitality Committee.
- Frederick Osborne Watts, JP. For public and municipal services in Stockport and Riverton, State of South Australia.
- Alfred Ernest Young, MRCS, LRCP, Medical Officer, Basutoland.
- Dora Chadwick, Assistant (Nursing), Office of the Surgeon-General with the Government of Madras.
- Ethel Ellen Hutchings, ARRC, Chief Lady Superintendent, Auxiliary Nursing Service, in the Office of the Director-General, Indian Medical Service.
- Abdul Quadir, Indian Audit & Accounts Service, Deputy Financial Adviser, Communications, Government of India.
- Mulk Raj Ahuja, Indian Government Trade Commissioner in Canada.
- William Gordon Alexander, Indian Civil Service, Joint Financial Adviser, Military Finance.
- Richard Charles Arbery, MBE, Indian Ordnance Services, Controller of Inspection, Metallurgical.
- Lieutenant-Colonel George Quintin Archard, Officer Commanding, No 28, Indian Pioneer Corps Group, Gorakhpur, United Provinces.
- Fateh Chand Badhwar, MBE, lately Secretary, Railway Board, New Delhi.
- Henry Arthur Northey Barlow, Political Agent and Deputy Commissioner in Quetta, Pishin.
- Kashinath Yeshwant Bhandarkar, Assistant Solicitor (Officiating Second Solicitor) to the Government of India.
- Krishna Behari Bhatia, Indian Civil Service, Secretary to Government, Agriculture Department, United Provinces.
- Paresh Chandra Bhattacharya, Indian Audit & Accounts Service, Joint Financial Adviser (Supply), Government of India.
- Albert Edward Caffin, Indian Police, Deputy Commissioner of Police, Bombay City, Bombay.
- William Thomas Stanley Cairns, Chief Mechanical Engineer, Oudh and Tirhut Railway, Gorakhpur.
- Thomas Carter, MBE, Manager, Government of India Press, Calcutta.
- Henry Douglas Cayley, Deputy Controller of the Exchange Control Department of the Reserve Bank of India.
- Surendra Nath Chakravarti, MBE, Indian Service of Engineers, Chief Engineer (Development), Public Works Department, Buildings & Roads Branch, United Provinces.
- James William Chippendale, Advocate, Calcutta High Court, Bengal.
- Captain Inder Sen Chopra, MBE, Secretary to the Honourable the Agent to the Governor-General, Resident and Chief Commissioner in Baluchistan.
- Charles-Leslie Coates, Indian Civil Service, Deputy Secretary to the Government of India in the Department of Industries & Supplies.
- Alan Campbell Combe, General Manager, Kumardhubi Engineering Works, Kumardhubi, Bihar.
- Vishweswar Dayal Dantyagi, Indian Audit & Accounts Service, Additional Director of Audit, War & Supply, Government of India.
- Rai Bahadur Atul Chandra Das, Deputy Secretary to the Government of India in the Department of Works, Mines & Power.
- Vincent Ellis Davies, Indian Civil Service, Secretary to the Government of Bihar, Finance Department, Bihar.
- Shankar Rao Yado Rao Deshmukh, MBE, Barrister-at-Law, Nagpur, Central Provinces and Berar.
- Antony Elliot Drake, Indian Political Service, lately Secretary to the Honourable the Resident in Mysore.
- Subimal Dutt, Indian Civil Service, Additional Secretary to the Government of Bengal, Agriculture, Forests & Fisheries Department.
- Frederick William Victor Ellvers, Senior Partner and Managing Director, Messrs. Spedding, Dinga Singh & Co., Timber Merchants, Lahore, Punjab.
- Lieutenant-Colonel Robert Leslie Evans, IE, Deputy Electrical Commissioner in the Office of the Electrical Commissioner with the Government of India.
- Angelo Firpo, MBE, Proprietor, Firpo's Restaurant, Calcutta.
- Lieutenant-Colonel William Donald Francis, MBE, Indian Army, 13th Frontier Force Rifles, Commandant, Kurram Militia, North-West Frontier Province.
- Lieutenant-Colonel John Henry Dunningham Gardner, Commandant, Railforce, Assam.
- Prabhas Chandra Ghose, Deputy Director-General, Directorate-General of Munitions Production, Department of Industries & Supplies, Government of India.
- Arthur Geoffrey Tindall Glaisby, Controller of Stores, Great Indian Peninsula Railway, Bombay.
- Reginald William Godfrey, Indian Police, Secretary to His Excellency the Governor of Assam.
- Major Colin Campbell Gulliland, Secretary, Royal Western India Turf Club Ltd., and lately Commandant, His Excellency the Governor's Bodyguard, Bombay.
- Geoffrey Alexander Haig, Indian Civil Service, Secretary to Government, Civil Supplies Department, United Provinces.
- Kenneth George Hamnett, Director, Government Transport Service, Bombay.
- Hubert Arnold Harris, Indian Service of Engineers, Officiating Chief Engineer and Secretary to Government, Public Works Department, Buildings & Roads Branch, Punjab.
- Mohammad Hidayatullah, Barrister-at-Law, Advocate-General, Central Provinces and Berar.
- Walter George Hulland, Indian Civil Service, Joint Secretary to Government, Reconstruction Department, Bombay.
- Captain Arthur Durnford Iliff, MRCS, Indian Medical Service, Agency Surgeon, South Waziristan, North-West Frontier Province.
- Hafiz Syed Muhammad Ishaque, Indian Civil Service, Special Officer, Agriculture Department, Bengal.
- Major Muhammad Jafar, Indian Medical Service, Director of Public Health, Bengal.
- Anthony Samuel James, MC, Deputy Director-General, Telephones, Posts & Telegraphs Directorate, New Delhi.
- James Leslie Jenkin, Controller, India Store Department, Office of the High Commissioner for India in London.
- Edwin Done Johnson, Works Manager, Indian Cable Co. Ltd., Golmuri (Jamshedpur), Bihar.
- Rai Bahadur Lala Kanwar Sain, Indian Service of Engineers, Officiating Superintending Engineer, Public Works Department, Irrigation Branch, Punjab.
- Burjor Framji Khambatta, MBE, Port Health Officer, Karachi.
- Suchendrum Yegnanarayana Krishnaswamy, Indian Civil Service, Joint Secretary to the Government of Madras in the Development Department.
- Bishwa Nath Lahiri, Indian Police, Superintendent, Government Railway Police, Allahabad, United Provinces.
- Malcolm Vyvyan Laurie, Director, Timber Supplies, Department of Industries & Supplies, Government of India.
- Lieutenant-Colonel (Local Brigadier) Roy Lancelot Lemon, Chief of Military Staff, Gwalior Army.
- Alexander Mackintosh, Managing Director, Messrs. Greaves Cotton & Co. Ltd., Bombay.
- Gopal Dass Madhok, Medical Practitioner, Jaffirband, Hailakandi, Cachar, Assam.
- Major James Feris Maxwell, Commandant, Mewar Bhil Corps.
- John McIntyre, Deputy Agricultural Production Adviser (Manures) to the Government of India.
- Commander (E) Henry John Mills, Commander, Royal Indian Navy, and Principal Engineer and Ship Surveyor, Mercantile Marine Department, Calcutta.
- Sri Pejavar Mohan Rau, Accountant-General (retired) and Examiner of Local Fund Accounts, Madras.
- John Percival Morton, Indian Police, Senior Superintendent of Police, Lahore, Punjab.
- Khan Bahadur Chaudhri Muhammad Hussain, Advocate, Gujranwala, Punjab.
- Major James Duncan Murdoch, MB, FRCS(Ed), Indian Medical Service, Professor of Obstetrics & Gynaecology, Prince of Wales Medical College, Patna, Bihar.
- Erach Ardeshir Nadirshah, Hydraulic Engineer, Bombay Municipality, Bombay.
- James Nicholas Eastman Nagle, Chief Transportation Manager, Bengal Assam Railway, Calcutta.
- Rai Bahadur Lala Nathu Ram, MBE, lately City Magistrate, Delhi.
- Wilfrid Andrew Nightingale, Deputy Chief Controller of Standardization (Mechanical), Railway Board, New Delhi.
- Prakash Chandra Padhi, Indian Audit & Accounts Service, Commissioner of Income Tax, Madras.
- Gopal Ramchandra Paranjpe, Indian Educational Service (retired), lately Principal, Royal Institute of Science, Bombay.
- Bhailal Chotalal Patel, Deputy Textile Commissioner, Office of the Textile Commissioner for India, Bombay.
- Hem Singh Pruthi, PhD, Plant Protection Adviser to the Government of India, and Director, Locust Control, India.
- Sardar Abdur Rahman Khan, Landlord, Zaildar of Sahiwal, and Chairman, Debt Conciliation Board, Khushab, Shahpur District, Punjab.
- Rao Bahadur Kizhakke Covilagam Kutty Ettan Raja, LMS, LRCP, LRFPS, DPH, DTM&H, Secretary, Health, Survey & Development Committee and lately Assistant Public Health Commissioner with the Government of India.
- John Cecil Roberts, Member of the Delhi Municipal Committee and of the Notified Area Committee, Civil Station, Delhi.
- Robert Morton Saner, MBE, Indian Civil Service, Officer on Special Duty, Government of the United Provinces.
- Dwijendra Kumar Sanyal, Secretary, Calcutta University Appointment & Information Board, Bengal.
- Claude Scott, Director of Information, Bombay.
- Dhindra Mohan Sen, Deputy Educational Adviser and Deputy Secretary, Government of India, Department of Education.
- Brij Lal Sharma, Deputy Principal Information Officer, Press Information Bureau, Information & Arts Department, Government of India.
- Andrew Herbert Southorn, MBE, Indian Civil Service, Deputy Secretary to the Government of Madras in the Public Department.
- Mavattakudi Sinnaswamy Srinivasan, Deputy Controller of Stamps, Security Printing, India.
- Kavassari Narayan Iyer Subramanian, Indian Civil Service, Secretary to Government (officiating), Central Provinces and Berar.
- Gurus Wami Sastri Swaminathan, MBE, Indian Audit & Accounts Service, Deputy Secretary to the Government of India in the Finance Department.
- Andrew William Taylor, Manager, Messrs. Garden Reach Workshop and an Assistant in Messrs. McNeil & Co., Managing Agents, Calcutta.
- George Ewart Terry, MInstCE, MIE, Chief Engineer, Bombay Port Trust.
- Major Geoffrey Benion Thomas, MB, ChB, FRCSEd, MRCOG, Indian Medical Service, Superintendent, Government Hospital for Women and Children, and Professor of Midwifery, Madras Medical College, Madras.
- Lieutenant-Colonel Kenneth James Thouless, Postmaster-General, Bombay.
- Syama Chandra Tripathi, Indian Educational Service, Director of Public Instruction, Orissa.
- Camar Tyabjee, Managing Director, Osmanshahi & Azam Jahi Mills, Hyderabad (Deccan).
- Gopala Venkateswara Ayyar, Indian Civil Service, Secretary Board of Revenue, Madras.
- Khan Bahadur Mohammad Walait Khan Ghakhar, Army Contractor and Honorary Assistant Recruiting Officer, Asansol, Burdwan, Bengal.
- Harold Mackenzie Walker, Superintendent, Mechanical Workshops, North-Western Railway, Lahore.
- David Walley, Indian Civil Service, Deputy Commissioner, Lucknow, United Provinces.
- Hugh Clough Waters, Partner, Messrs. Orr, Dignam & Co., Calcutta, Bengal.
- Leonard Watts-Morgan, Regional Coal Controller, Baluchistan and Sind.
- Bernard Fletcher Kane, Deputy Chief Engineer, Telecommunications Department, Government of Burma.
- U Ba Tun, KSM, ATM, Under Secretary, Home Department, Government of Burma.
- Ratnam Aparajoo, LMSSA. For service as Surgeon, Penang, during the Japanese occupation.
- John Philip Attenborough, Colonial Education Service, Director of Education, Aden.
- John Barrow, Colonial Administrative Service, District Officer, Hong Kong. For services in connection with the rehabilitation of the Colony.
- Thomas Barton, Colonial Education Service, Deputy Director of Education, Gold Coast.
- Henry Eugene Belmar. For public services in St. Lucia.
- George Edward Bogaars, lately Private Secretary to the Governor of the Straits Settlements. For services during the Japanese occupation.
- Herbert Harris Brown, Director of Fishery Investigation, Development & Welfare, West Indies.
- Roger Castillo, lately Secretary to the Government of Malta.
- Elizabeth Choy. For services during the Japanese occupation of Malaya.
- Khoon Heng Choy. For services during the Japanese occupation of Malaya.
- Lai Po Chuen, MB, BS, lately Medical Officer, Medical Department, Hong Kong. For services during the Japanese occupation.
- Thomas Pearson Cromwell, Malayan Civil Service. For services during internment.
- John Sydney Dash, Colonial Agricultural Service, Director of Agriculture, British Guiana.
- Reginald James Aston Percival de Glanville, lately Acting Assistant Attorney General, Bahamas.
- Frederick Claude Deighton, Colonial Agricultural Service, Plant Pathologist, Sierra Leone.
- John De Meza, MRCVS, Colonial Veterinary Service, Chief Veterinary Officer, Nyasaland.
- George Sidney Dilck, Chief Engineer, Sierra Leone Railway.
- The Reverend George Herbert Eastman. For public services in the Gilbert and Ellice Islands.
- Harold Fairbairn, MD, DTM&H, Colonial Medical Service, Sleeping Sickness Officer, Tanganyika Territory.
- Lennox Elgin Wentworth Forsyth, Senior Commissioner, Bahamas.
- George William Hatchell, MBE, lately Deputy Censor, Tanganyika Territory.
- Brian Charles Keith Hawkins, Colonial Administrative Service, Labour Officer, Hong Kong. For services in connection with the rehabilitation of the Colony.
- John Hayward, Colonial Postal Service, Colonial Postmaster, Gibraltar.
- Wyatt Hayward. For public services in the Gambia.
- Francis Bernard Higgins, Colonial Mines Service, Chief Inspector of Mines, Gold Coast.
- Thomas Stephen Hinds, Colonial Customs Service, Controller of Customs and Commissioner of Excise, Mauritius.
- Helen Ho, Auxiliary Nursing Service, Hong Kong. For services during hostilities and the Japanese occupation.
- John Hoskins, Technical Instructor, Education Department, Nigeria.
- Tse Jen Hua, Medical Officer, Medical Department, Hong Kong. For services during the Japanese occupation.
- Cecil Thomas Hutson, Assistant Superintendent, Kenya and Uganda Railways and Harbours.
- Robert Johns, Colonial Agricultural Service, Director of Agriculture, Leeward Islands.
- Marjorie Jean Lyon, MB, BS, FRCS.(Ed.), Colonial Medical Service, Medical Officer, Malaya. For services during evacuation and internment.
- Hugh MacDonald. For public services in Uganda.
- Duncan William MacIntosh, Colonial Police Service, Staff Officer, Security Service, Malaya.
- Edgar John Marsden. For public services in Trinidad.
- Monrad Sigfrid Metzgen, MBE. For public services in British Honduras.
- Nathan Isidor Mindel, Deputy Commissioner of Migration, Palestine.
- Commander Donald Cecil Granville Neish, Royal Navy (retd.), Master Attendant, Colombo and Galle, Ceylon.
- Kenneth Mandor Oliver, MC. For public services in Nigeria.
- Isaac Ladipo Oluwole, MB, ChB, Medical Officer of Health, Lagos Town Council, Nigeria.
- Eboo Pirbhai. For public services in Kenya.
- Norman Stewart Price, Colonial Administrative Service, Administrative Officer, Northern Rhodesia.
- Tellipalai Chinnappah Rajaratnam. For public services in Ceylon.
- Charles Wakefield Richmond, AMIMechE, Deputy Chief Engineer, The Crown Agents for the Colonies.
- Griffith Greenwich Roberts Sharp, Food Controller, Jamaica.
- Godfrey Butler Simmins, Colonial Veterinary Service, Chief Veterinary Officer, Palestine.
- John Sykes, Colonial Education Service, Deputy Director of Education, Uganda.
- James Patrick Taylor, MB, ChM, Principal Medical Officer, British North Borneo (Chartered) Company. For services during the Japanese occupation.
- Robert Scott Taylor, MB, ChB, DPH, Medical Officer of Health, Zanzibar.
- Gar Hsi Thomas, MBE, MD, BS, Medical Officer, Medical Department, Hong Kong. For services during the enemy occupation.
- Hugh Thompson Wells. For public services in Kenya.
- Arthur Stewart Westmorland, MRCS, LRCP, DTM&H, Colonial Medical Service, Senior Medical Officer, Kingston Public Hospital, Jamaica.
- Godfrey Pountney Willougby, MIEE, Colonial Postal Service, Engineer-in-Chief, Posts & Telegraphs Department, Kenya, Uganda and Tanganyika Territory.
- The Very Reverend Father Seraphim Zarb. For public services in Malta.

Honorary Officers

- Chief Bathoen Seeapitso Gaseitsiwe, of the Bangwaketsi Tribe, Bechuanaland Protectorate. For services to his people and to the Administration.
- Theodore Artemis, Managing Director, Cyprus Trading Corporation.
- Quaianaqam (Colonel) Bahjet Tabbara, Commander, Arab Legion Garrison Companies, Trans-Jordan.
- Selim Yusef Bishara, MBE, Mayor of Nazareth, Palestine. Senator, Administrator of the Hebrew University, Jerusalem, Palestine.
- Cheong Yok Choy. For services prior to and during the Japanese occupation of Malaya.

==== Member of the Order of the British Empire (MBE) ====
Military Division

Royal Navy

- Acting Ordnance Commander John William Albert Adams.
- Lieutenant John Luttrell Aldridge.
- Temporary Lieutenant (Sp) Frank Talbot Ashworth, RNVR.
- First Officer Grizel Mary Ballantyne, WRNS.
- Temporary Lieutenant Bernard William Beard, RNVR.
- Lieutenant (E) Harold Godfrey Bird, RNVR.
- Temporary Lieutenant (S) Andrew Ronald Blackwood, RNVR.
- Acting Lieutenant-Commander Henry Blundell, RNR.
- Second Officer Nancy Emma Bond, WRNS.
- Mr. William Richard Booley, Temporary Acting Commissioned Aircraft Officer.
- Temporary Sub-Lieutenant (Sp) Charles Bosworth, RNVR.
- Temporary Commander (Sp) Ernest Victor Bowers, RNVR.
- The Reverend William Horace Boxall, Chaplain.
- Temporary Acting Lieutenant-Commander (Sp) George Nathan Bratt, RNVR.
- First Officer Margaret Maud Bray, WRNS.
- Temporary Lieutenant-Commander (Sp) Gerald Grant Bremner, RNVR.
- Temporary Acting Lieutenant-Commander Christopher Briggs, RNR.
- Mr. Geoffrey Walter Britten, Warrant Wardmaster.
- Temporary Surgeon Lieutenant Alastair Kingsley Brown, MB, ChB, RNVR.
- First Officer Marion Enid Buckland, WRNS.
- Temporary Acting Lieutenant William Burgess, RNVR.
- Temporary First Officer Lillian Betty Campbell, Women's Royal Indian Naval Service.
- Second Officer Vera Edith Blanche Cannon, WRNS.
- Second Officer Margaret Lacey Carter, WRNS.
- Mr. John Cassford, Acting Commissioned Boatswain.
- Mr. Kenneth Chanter, Commissioned Gunner.
- Acting Headmaster Lieutenant Commander William Arthur Choules.
- Mr. George Reginald Cleaver, Temporary Acting Commissioned Gunner.
- Acting Temporary Lieutenant-Commander (E) Cyril Frederick Ingram Coggins, RNVR.
- Mr. Arthur James Condon, Commissioned Signal Boatswain.
- Second Officer Pauline Joan Cookman-Roberts, WRNS.
- Acting Temporary Lieutenant-Commander (E) Reginald Bruce Cooper.
- Lieutenant (E) Ronald Robertson Anderson Cowan.
- Lieutenant-Commander (S) Richard John Cox, (Retd.)
- Lieutenant Kenneth Alston Cradock-Hartopp.
- Temporary Lieutenant John Sinclair Cursiter, RNVR.
- Temporary Lieutenant (A) John Ivor Davies, RNVR.
- Temporary Lieutenant James Robertson Deans, RNVR.
- Mr. Trevosso Richard John Ernest Dewdney, Temporary Gunner.
- Mr. Robert Denton, Dixon, Acting Temporary Commissioned Telegraphist.
- Temporary Electrical Lieutenant Charles Aaron Dodd, RNVR.
- Acting Lieutenant-Commander (S) Peter Ivan Edwards, Royal Indian Naval Volunteer Reserve.
- Mr. Edward Augustus Evans, Commissioned Gunner.
- Lieutenant (S) Robert James Bell Finlay.
- Temporary Acting Lieutenant-Commander (A) George William Kinvig Ford, RNVR.
- Mr. George William Foster, Warrant Recruiter.
- Mr. John Albert Victor France, Warrant Writer Officer.
- First Officer Pauline Margaret Wrench Frankland, WRNS.
- Lieutenant-Commander (E) George Wilsmore Gay, DSC.
- Mr. Walter Gibbon, Temporary Acting Commissioned Master-at-Arms.
- First Officer Elizabeth Worsley Gibson, WRNS.
- Mr. William Edward Gillings, Temporary Acting Commissioned Master-at-Arms.
- Temporary Lieutenant William Henry Goodridge, Royal Marines.
- Second Officer Elsie Sibyl Grain, WRNS.
- Mr. Charles Frederick Griffiths, Acting Commissioned Aircraft Officer.
- Second Officer Barbara Joyce Grylls, WRNS.
- Temporary Lieutenant (A) Arthur Hamersley, RNVR.
- Temporary Acting Lieutenant-Commander (S) David Hailing Hammond, RNVR.
- Temporary Lieutenant Leslie Charles Hammond, RNR.
- Headmaster Lieutenant Sydney Walter Harman.
- Temporary Skipper John Dennis Harness, RNR.
- Temporary Lieutenant Colin Hepplestone, RNVR.
- Acting Lieutenant-Commander Harry Hewitt, (Retd.)
- Temporary Lieutenant (Acting Temporary-Captain) Joseph Douglas Hickling, Royal Marine Engineers.
- Lieutenant Commander Robert Nelson Hickson, (Retd.)
- Temporary Lieutenant Frederick Hockey, RNVR.
- Acting Lieutenant-Commander (Sp) Duncan Charles Holloway, Royal Indian Naval Volunteer Reserve.
- Mr. Herbert Randolph Hopkins, Acting Commissioned Writer Officer.
- Temporary Lieutenant (Sp) Max Tudor Howard-Williams, RNVR.
- Acting Temporary Lieutenant-Commander (E), John Howie.
- Temporary Lieutenant (S) Robert James Jamieson, RNVR.
- Lieutenant (A) (Ae) Horace Aubrey Jarrett.
- Acting Lieutenant-Commander (Sp) Elijah Ephraim Jhirad, Royal Indian Naval Volunteer Reserve.
- Temporary Acting Lieutenant-Commander David Edwin Keir, RNVR.
- Mr. Howard Joseph Kempton, Acting Commissioned Superintending Clerk, Royal Marines.
- Mr. William Henry James Knight, Warrant Mechanician.
- Temporary Acting Lieutenant-Commander (Sp) Reginald Lawrence, RNVR.
- Temporary Acting Lieutenant-Commander George David Laws, DSC, RNVR.
- Temporary Captain (Acting Temporary Major) James Leah, Royal Marines.
- Temporary Captain (Acting Temporary Major) Walter Neville Leatherbarrow, Royal Marines.
- Lieutenant (A) Richard Thomas Leggott.
- Mr. Samuel Henry Leigh, Acting Commissioned Stores Officer.
- First Officer Margaret Hilda Love, WRNS.
- Temporary Lieutenant-Commander (Sp) John Patrick Lovett, RNVR.
- Temporary Lieutenant (Acting Temporary Captain) Augustus Arthur Charles Mann, Royal Marines.
- Mr. Stanley Joseph Henry Mardon, Commissioned Engineer.
- Mr. Arthur Edwin Mathias, Acting Commissioned Master-at-Arms.
- Temporary Lieutenant Desmond McGrath, RNVR.
- Mr. Eric Millburn, Acting Commissioned Writer Officer.
- Lieutenant Gervase Annesley Milward.
- Mr. Frederick Edward Moreton, Commissioned Boatswain.
- Temporary Acting Lieutenant-Commander William Wyndham Mortimer, RNR.
- Lieutenant Derek William Napper.
- Temporary Lieutenant (Sp) Edwin Charles Nash, RNVR.
- Temporary First Officer Zillah Tempest Neal, Women's Royal Indian Naval Service.
- Temporary Acting Lieutenant-Commander Charles Gerald Nodin, RNVR.
- Lieutenant (A) David Slingsby Ogle, DSC, RNVR.
- Telegraphist Lieutenant Percy James Olding, DSM, MSM, (Retd.)
- Temporary Acting Lieutenant-Commander (Sp) Horace Arthur Oliver, RNVR.
- Temporary Captain (Acting Temporary Major) Mervyn George Orchard-Lisle, Royal Marines.
- Temporary Acting Lieutenant-Commander William Proctor Page, RNR.
- Temporary Sub-Lieutenant (Sp) Eric John Palfreyman, RNVR.
- Temporary Lieutenant Albert Edward Peter, RNVR.
- Temporary Lieutenant (Sp) Peter Poilcot, RNVR.
- Temporary Acting Lieutenant-Commander (E) George Stuart Pond, RNVR.
- Mr. James Arthur Puttock, Temporary Warrant Aircraft Officer.
- Mr. Percy Rees, Temporary Warrant Wardmaster, RNVR.
- Temporary Acting Lieutenant-Commander (E) Donald Richardson.
- Mr. Frank Rippington, Temporary Acting Commissioned Aircraft Officer.
- Acting Temporary Lieutenant-Commander Arthur Cecil Robb, RNVR.
- Temporary Acting Electrical Lieutenant-Commander, Henry Robert Robinson, RNVR.
- Acting Lieutenant-Commander (E) John Lakin Rogers, Royal Indian Navy.
- Temporary Acting Lieutenant-Commander (E) Frederick George Rose, RNR.
- Temporary Lieutenant Norman Douglas Ross, South African Naval Forces (Voluntary).
- First Officer Doris Kathleen Russell, WRNS.
- Lieutenant Atma Jit Singh, Royal Indian Naval Reserve.
- Captain Stanley Jefford Skinner, Royal Marines.
- Mr. William Henry Skinner, Commissioned Electrician.
- First Officer Patricia Somers-Brown, WRNS.
- Acting Chief Officer Jean Margaret Stewart, WRNS.
- The Reverend Charles Strong, Temporary Chaplain, RNVR.
- Acting Lieutenant Frederick Claude Terry.
- Temporary First Officer Sybil Mary Thom, Women's Royal Indian Naval Service.
- Acting Temporary Lieutenant-Commander (S) Francis Herbert Thomas, RNVR.
- Temporary Lieutenant Bernard Thomson, RNVR.
- Temporary Lieutenant (E) George Thomson, RNVR.
- Acting Lieutenant (E) Charles Horace Tinker.
- Acting Lieutenant-Commander (S) Edward Russell Tipple.
- Temporary Lieutenant (Acting Temporary Captain) Bernard Gilbert Tozer, Royal Marines.
- Temporary Sub-Lieutenant John Vernon Trathen, South African Naval Forces (Voluntary).
- Temporary Acting Lieutenant-Commander Maurice Lamplugh Malcolm Trevor, RNVR.
- Temporary Sub-Lieutenant (A) Roy Leslie Turnbull, RNVR.
- Mr. Percy Turner, Acting Commissioned Superintending Clerk Royal Marines.
- Mr. William Henry Turner, Temporary Acting Commissioned Cookery Officer.
- Mr. Ernest Charles Tye, DCM, Warrant Recruiter, Royal Marines.
- Mr. Augustus William Wade, Acting Commissioned Gunner (T).
- Temporary Acting Lieutenant Commander Andrew John Wilkie, RNR.
- Temporary Captain Edwin Henry Wood, Royal Marines.
- Mr. David Wyatt, Warrant Engineer.
- Temporary Captain (Acting Temporary Major) John Trevor Yates, Royal Marines.
- Acting Chief Officer Thelma Ziman, WRNS.

Army

- Colonel (acting) The Reverend Herbert Alldridge Abbott (21053), Army Cadet Force.
- Captain (temporary) Abdul Wahid (I.E.C.5986), 8th Punjab Regiment, Indian Army.
- Major (temporary) Frederick Douglas Adams (248137), Royal Electrical and Mechanical Engineers.
- No 827711 Warrant Officer Class I (acting) William Addicott, Royal Regiment of Artillery.
- Lieutenant-Colonel (EMAE) Edgar Stanley Adhemar (O.W.12), Indian Electrical and Mechanical Engineers.
- No 2694303 Warrant Officer Class I James Aitken, The Highland Light Infantry (City of Glasgow Regiment).
- Major (temporary) Alexander Leonard Aitken-Head (85097), Royal Regiment of Artillery.
- Major Ajit Singhji, Bhavnagar State Forces, Indian States Forces.
- Subadar Akbar Ali (46787 I.O.), Indian Army Ordnance Corps.
- Captain (temporary) Alfred Albery (O.W.146), Indian Electrical and Mechanical Engineers.
- Captain Lawrence Walter Aldridge, Captain and Adjutant, Falkland Islands Defence Force.
- No 7601793 Warrant Officer Class I Eddie Conrad Allchorn, Royal Electrical and Mechanical Engineers (attached Indian Electrical and Mechanical Engineers).
- Major (temporary) John George Allen (63605), Royal Army Pay Corps.
- Captain (temporary) Walter Henry Richard Allen (C.C.161), Indian Army Corps of Clerks.
- Captain Edward Rowland Milles Alston (23155), Scots Guards.
- Junior Commander (temporary) Amir Sen (W.A.C.845), Women's Auxiliary Corps (India).
- Major (temporary) Ian Alfred Anderson, MB (86733), Royal Army Medical Corps.
- Major (temporary) Robert Alexander Frederick Anderson (212088), Royal Corps of Signals.
- No 1874140 Warrant Officer Class II Charles Andrews, Corps of Royal Engineers.
- Captain (Quartermaster) Alfred Rupert Appleyard (196996), Royal Regiment of Artillery.
- Major (temporary) Albert Maurice Arbib (187943), Royal Army Service Corps.
- Major (temporary) Edward Henry Campbell Archer (105755) The Argyll and Sutherland Highlanders (Princess Louise's) (attached The Baluch Regiment, Indian Army).
- Major (temporary) Michael Richard Arkwright (66062), 1st King's Dragoon Guards, Royal Armoured Corps.
- Major (temporary) Atma Singh (I.E.C.319), Indian Army.
- Major (temporary) Raymond Charles Baglin (193622), Royal Regiment of Artillery.
- Major (temporary) Richard Siddoway Kemmel Bagnall (184822), The Durham Light Infantry (attached Royal Indian Army Service Corps).
- Subedar Major Bahadur Thapa (6447), 3rd Queen Alexandra's Own Ghurka Rifles, Indian Army.
- No 759179 Warrant Officer Class II George Bailey, Army Physical Training Corps.
- Major (temporary) George Henry William Baker (O.W.60), Indian Electrical and Mechanical Engineers.
- No 394423 Warrant Officer Class II Reginald Arthur Baker, Royal Armoured Corps.
- Major (temporary) Thomas Garnett Newman Bardwell, TD (99665), Intelligence Corps.
- Captain Walter Richard Arthur Barnett (127400), Royal Corps of Signals.
- Major (temporary) Kenneth Alan Bayley (E.C.427), 8th Punjab Regiment, Indian Army.
- No 4626756 Warrant Officer Class I Gerald Ivan Bearcroft, Royal Army Service Corps (attached Indian Army Corps of Clerks).
- No 3185913 Warrant Officer Class I Andrew Ekron Beattie, The King's Own Scottish Borderers.
- Captain (temporary) Alan Dudley Benham, MSc, AMInstCE (282917), Corps of Royal Engineers.
- Lieutenant Cecil Frederick Benham (E.C.14018), Indian Army.
- Captain (temporary) George Arthur Edward John Bennett (180829), Royal Corps of Signals.
- Major (temporary) Theodore Berman (296385), Royal Army Service Corps.
- Captain (temporary) Bhola Nath (I.E.C.3936), Airborne Troops (attached Indian Airborne Forces Training Unit).
- Captain Raffaello William Biagi, MB (141478), Royal Army Medical Corps.
- No 1867272 Warrant Officer Class II Leonard William Biles, Corps of Royal Engineers.
- Lieutenant-Colonel (acting) Harold Tom Bisgood, MM (195155), Army Cadet Force.
- Major (temporary) Percy Edward Blunt (E.C.2178), Indian Army.
- Major Cyril Hughes Boulton, TD (38020), The Lancashire Fusiliers.
- Major (temporary) William Herbert Bowen (211993), Royal Army Service Corps.
- The Reverend Frederick Wallace Bowlee (144567), Chaplain to the Forces, 3rd Class (temporary), Royal Army Chaplains' Department.
- Major (temporary) John Bratton (E.C.7299), Defence of India Corps.
- Major (temporary) Brij Lal (I.E.C.3150), 10th Baluch Regiment, Indian Army.
- Captain (temporary) (DC) Christopher Gladwin Brisley (306 C.C.), Indian Army Corps of Clerks.
- Lieutenant-Colonel (temporary) Ronald Bristow (O.S.54), Indian Army Ordnance Corps.
- Major (temporary) Frank Roy Broach (E.C.2269), "Special List" of Quartermasters of the Indian Army.
- Captain Stanley Broadbent (E.C.5173), 6th Rajputana Rifles, Indian Army.
- No 52504 Warrant Officer Class I Alfred Frederick James Brooks, Royal Army Pay Corps.
- Lieutenant (Quartermaster) Charles William Alfred Brown (345386), Pioneer Corps.
- Lieutenant George Harry Brown (293521), Corps of Royal Engineers.
- Major (temporary) Roy Elder Brown (E.C.1053), Royal Indian Army Service Corps.
- Major (temporary) Bernard Henry Flint Buckmaster (42501), Royal Army Pay Corps.
- Major (temporary) Thomas Burns (259163), Corps of Royal Engineers.
- No S/199213 Warrant Officer Class I (acting) Victor Henry Burr, Royal Army Service Corps.
- Major (acting) William Benjamin Butt (I.E.C.517), 8th Punjab Regiment (attached Indian Engineers).
- Lieutenant (Quartermaster) John William Bye (359297), Royal Army Ordnance Corps.
- Captain (temporary) Howard Oscar Wilton Bygrave (194752), Royal Army Service Corps.
- Lieutenant-Colonel (acting) Quentin Power Cafferata (121001), Royal Regiment of Artillery.
- Major (temporary) Leslie Arthur Camken (163957), Corps of Royal Engineers.
- Captain (temporary) Donald Albert Campbell (262815), Royal Regiment of Artillery.
- Lieutenant-Colonel (temporary) Andrew Quinton Carr (E.C.1412), 9th Gurkha Rifles, Indian Army.
- Major (temporary) Charles Victor Carr (121966), Corps of Royal Engineers.
- No 3446016 Warrant Officer Class I William Henry Cart, The Lancashire Fusiliers.
- Lieutenant (AC) Mervyn Thornton Carville (C.C.315), Indian Army Corps of Clerks.
- No 6011437 Warrant Officer Class I (acting) Harold Chalk, The Essex Regiment.
- Captain Robert Charles Chambers (205127), Corps of Royal Engineers.
- Major (temporary) (DC) John Charnley (C.C.19), Indian Army Corps of Clerks.
- Captain (temporary) Noel Willink Chavasse, MC (174749), The Middlesex Regiment (Duke of Cambridge's Own).
- Major (temporary) Abdul Rashid Choudhri (I.E.C.4277), 6th Rajputana Rifles, Indian Army.
- Captain (Quartermaster) Ernest Clarke (178693), The King's Own Yorkshire Light Infantry, late Army Air Corps.
- Major (temporary) Richard James Avery Clarke (226970), Royal Army Service Corps.
- Captain (temporary) Wilfred Edgar Cleaver (E.C.2490), Royal Indian Army Service Corps.
- Lieutenant-Colonel (temporary) Robert Mathers Clough (88615), Royal Regiment of Artillery.
- Junior Commander Angela Vera Cobb (196674), Auxiliary Territorial Service.
- Junior Commander (temporary) Zena Marina Cobbett (920), Women's Auxiliary Corps (India).
- Major (temporary) Harold Godfrey Cockaday (51744), Royal Regiment of Artillery.
- Major (temporary) Charles Mundy Cockin (E.C.1675), Royal Indian Army Service Corps.
- Lieutenant John William Coddington (173551), Royal Regiment of Artillery.
- Lieutenant-Colonel (acting) Richard Francis Coles (99799), The Hampshire Regiment.
- Major (temporary) Derrick Archibald Colls (155020), The King's Royal Rifle Corps.
- Major (temporary) Samuel Conyers (60962), The Sherwood Foresters (Nottinghamshire and Derbyshire Regiment).
- Major (temporary) Ralph Wallace Cook (176549), Corps of Royal Engineers.
- Major (temporary) Eric Cooke (345402), General List, Infantry.
- Senior Commander (temporary) Margaret Louise Fletcher-Cooke, Women's Auxiliary Corps (India).
- Captain (temporary) Robert Arthur Cooper, Southern Rhodesia Military Forces.
- Captain Sidney Baden Redvers Cooper (73416), Coldstream Guards.
- Captain (temporary) William Cooper (294009), Army Physical Training Corps.
- No 2717759 Warrant Officer Class II Thomas Edward Coppen, Irish Guards.
- Major (temporary) Terence Gilbert Coverdale (74641), The King's Own Scottish Borderers.
- No 2580359 Warrant Officer Class II Reginald Walter Cox, Royal Corps of Signals.
- Lieutenant-Colonel (temporary) Frank Ernest Coxhead (202456), Royal Army Ordnance Corps.
- No S/150984 Warrant Officer Class II Cecil Herbert Craine, Royal Army Service Corps.
- No S/198897 Warrant Officer Class II Phillip William Craven, Royal Army Service Corps.
- Captain (temporary) Edward Thomas Crawley (243789), Pioneer Corps.
- Captain (acting) Henry John Crompton (233363), Corps of Royal Engineers.
- Major (temporary) Alexander More Cunningham (E.C.1377), 1st King George V's Own Gurkha Rifles, Indian Army.
- Major Edwin Cecil James Cunningham, Indian Army (Retd.)
- Major (acting) Eric Francis Cutcliffe (174294), The Northamptonshire Regiment.
- Captain George William Cutts (195429), Royal Regiment of Artillery.
- Major (temporary) Wilfred Cutts (279175), General List, Infantry.
- Lieutenant-Colonel Edwin Forbes Dale (E.C.380), Indian Army Ordnance Corps.
- Major (temporary) Robson William Osmond Daltry (53190), The Wiltshire Regiment (Duke of Edinburgh's).
- Major Cecil John Dark (E.C.O.2175), 5th Mahratta Light Infantry, Indian Army.
- Captain (temporary) Marston Christopher David (E.C.6525), Indian Army.
- Major (temporary) Andrew Davidson (ECI0223), Indian Army.
- Lieutenant-Colonel (acting) Archibald Clelland Campbell Davie (253423), Royal Army Ordnance Corps.
- Captain (temporary) David John Davies (219182), The Welch Regiment.
- No 7610879 Warrant Officer Class I David Walter Davies, Royal Army Ordnance Corps.
- No 828286 Warrant Officer Class I Reginald Albert Davis, Royal Electrical and Mechanical Engineers.
- Captain (temporary) Reginald Sidney Davis (87980), The Royal Ulster Rifles.
- Major (temporary) Herbert Stanley Dawson (119110), Royal Electrical and Mechanical Engineers.
- Captain (temporary) Raymond Dean (328288), General List.
- The Reverend Roland Cecil Desch (128634), Chaplain to the Forces, 4th Class, Royal Army Chaplains' Department.
- Captain (Quartermaster) Alexander Dickie (173873), Royal Regiment of Artillery.
- Captain (temporary) Stuart Dicks (179558), Corps of Royal Engineers.
- Captain (temporary) Diwan Chand (I.E.C.8227), 11th Sikh Regiment, Indian Army.
- Captain (temporary) Frederick James Dodson (222847), Royal Army Ordnance Corps.
- Captain Edward Robert Donnley (165938), 9th Queen's Royal Lancers, Royal Armoured Corps.
- Lieutenant-Colonel (temporary) Dennis Clifford Duckitt (96102), Royal Corps of Signals (attached Indian Signal Corps).
- Major (temporary) Cecil Ensor Dudley (E.C.1966), Indian Army.
- Major (temporary) Edward Loraine Dunbar (E.C.597), Indian Army.
- Major (temporary) Aloysius Joseph Ronald Dyer (I.E.C.46), Royal Indian Army Service Corps.
- Captain (temporary) James Frederick David Dyer (C.C.163), Indian Army Corps of Clerks.
- No 1898772 Warrant Officer Class II Leslie Eastwood, Corps of Royal Engineers.
- Major (temporary) Robert Walter Edwards (159315), Corps of Royal Engineers.
- No 108909V Warrant Officer Class I Alwyn Owen Biccard Elias, MM, Union Defence Force.
- Major (temporary) Frank William Ellis (216282), Corps of Royal Engineers.
- Lieutenant-Colonel (temporary) Douglas James Elton (85317), The Artists Rifles, Territorial Army.
- Captain George Walter Emerton (E.C.6361), "Special List" of Quartermasters of the Indian Army.
- Major (temporary) George Carlyle Emslie (145613), The Argyll and Sutherland Highlanders (Princess Louise's).
- No S/57861 Warrant Officer Class II Lawrence Ennis, Royal Army Service Corps.
- Major (temporary) George Ewart (169928), Royal Regiment of Artillery.
- Major (temporary) Faqir Chand Kapoor, BA, BSc (R.O.2596), Indian Engineers.
- Lieutenant-Colonel (acting) Ewan Bridson Curphey Farrant (48454), Royal Army Ordnance Corps.
- Major (temporary) David Phillip Farrer (87754), Royal Regiment of Artillery.
- Risaldar Major Fazal Ahmed (7403 I.O.), Indian Army (Military Farms Department).
- Major (temporary) Roger Johnson Fenney (187232), Royal Regiment of Artillery.
- Captain (temporary) John James Fitzwilliam (175179), Royal Army Ordnance Corps.
- Major (temporary) Robert Cecil Flowerdew (116199), Corps of Royal Engineers.
- Major (temporary) George Ernest Crosby-Flynn, Indian Army.
- No 35674 Warrant Officer Class I Patrick Flynn, Royal Electrical and Mechanical Engineers.
- Captain Reginald Percy Harold Fortnum (127380), Army Air Corps.
- Captain (acting) William Edward Fox (329498), General List.
- Major (temporary) Alan Newstead Fradgley (125193), Corps of Royal Engineers.
- Major (temporary) Kenneth Robertson France (89831), Royal Regiment of Artillery.
- Lieutenant Colin James Francis (304749), Royal Corps of Signals.
- Captain (temporary) Ronald Edward Francis (276426), The Royal Welch Fusiliers.
- Major (temporary) George Tait Frew (E.C.7954), 18th Royal Garhwal Rifles, Indian Army.
- Lieutenant-Colonel (acting) Paul Elford Garbutt (167973), Corps of Royal Engineers.
- Major (temporary) Judah Garcia (106965), Royal Armoured Corps.
- Captain (temporary) William Geddes (E.C.7756), Royal Indian Army Service Corps.
- No 4626762 Warrant Officer Class I John Hugh George, Royal Army Service Corps (attached Indian Army Corps of Clerks).
- Major (acting) John Hugill Gibson (73032), Royal Regiment of Artillery.
- Major (temporary) Joseph Gidman (E.C.2612), Indian Engineers.
- Captain (temporary) Allan Raymond Gilbert (219913), Intelligence Corps.
- No 7010650 Warrant Officer Class II Malcolm Gillies, The Royal Ulster Rifles.
- Major (temporary) Edward Christopher Bagot Gilman (E.C.24), 6th Duke of Connaught's Own Lancers (Watson's Horse), Indian Armoured Corps.
- No 5946830 Warrant Officer Class II James Henry Gimbert, The Bedfordshire and Hertfordshire Regiment.
- No S/5933269 Warrant Officer Class II Noel Richard Golding, Royal Army Service Corps.
- Major (temporary) Ralph Kenneth Goldstein (E.C.5460), Indian Army Ordnance Corps.
- No 7647223 Warrant Officer Class II Eric Goode, Royal Army Ordnance Corps.
- Major (temporary) Leslie Frederick de Bretton Gordon (S.T.93), Royal Indian Army Service Corps.
- Captain (temporary) Jack Goss (259521), Royal Corps of Signals.
- Major (temporary) Robert Douglas Gould (E.C.15744), 9th Jat Regiment, Indian Army.
- Subedar Major Govindsing Limbu (104726), 10th Gurkha Rifles, Indian Army.
- Major (temporary) Kenneth Eric Frank Gowen (165336), Royal Corps of Signals.
- Major James Grahame (S.T.12), Royal Indian Army Service Corps.
- Major (temporary) Cecil Montague Grant (162109), Royal Tank Regiment, Royal Armoured Corps.
- Lieutenant-Colonel (temporary) Francis Westwood Grant (65982), Royal Regiment of Artillery.
- Lieutenant-Colonel (temporary) Frederick William Grant (68159), Indian Army Ordnance Corps.
- Lieutenant Ronald Peter Gray (259192), Corps of Royal Engineers.
- Major William Green (125810), Corps of Royal Engineers.
- No 4853347 Warrant Officer Class II William Arthur Green, The Leicestershire Regiment.
- Subaltern Florence Georgina Anne Gregory (316608), Auxiliary Territorial Service.
- Captain (temporary) Charles Greig (E.C.9651), Indian Army.
- Major (temporary) David Lloyd Griffiths, MB, FRCS (248764), Royal Army Medical Corps.
- Major (temporary) John Bertram William Grigson (109920), Royal Regiment of Artillery.
- No 232002 Warrant Officer Class I (acting) Davis Grossman, Corps of Royal Engineers.
- Major (temporary) Harry Douglas Morham Gunnell (51517), Pioneer Corps.
- No 1047170 Warrant Officer Class I Edward Hagan, Royal Regiment of Artillery.
- Subedar Major Hamesh Gul (I.O.6754), 12th Frontier Force Regiment, Indian Army.
- Lieutenant-Colonel (acting) William George Ernest Hammond (O.S.181), Indian Army Ordnance Corps.
- Major (temporary) John Edmund Handby (E.C.15133), Indian Army Ordnance Corps.
- Major (temporary) the Right Honourable Caryl Nicholas Charles, Viscount Hardinge (31958), 7th Queen's Own Hussars, Royal Armoured Corps.
- Major (temporary) Maurice John Hardy (103674), Corps of Royal Engineers.
- Captain (temporary) Ronald Hardy (261509), Corps of Royal Engineers.
- Captain Hari Chand Tugnait (M.Z.11625), Indian Army Medical Corps.
- Captain (temporary) Hari Das Bedi (I.C.R.O.164), Army in India Reserve of Officers.
- No 5495273 Warrant Officer Class I Henry James Harris, Indian Army Corps of Clerks.
- Junior Commander (temporary) Jean Pringle Bowtell-Harris (W.A.C.135), Women's Auxiliary Corps (India).
- No 2608862 Warrant Officer Class I William Robert Harrison, Reconnaissance Corps, Royal Armoured Corps.
- Major (temporary) Martin Mornement Harvey, DSO, MC (254427), General List, Infantry.
- Major (temporary) Ronald William Hawkes (210272), Corps of Royal Engineers.
- Major (temporary) Norman Ronald Hayes (303998), Royal Regiment of Artillery.
- Major (temporary) Clifford Toulson Healey (E.C.2996), 5th Mahratta Light Infantry, Indian Army.
- Captain (Quartermaster) Valentine Hehir (241229), Royal Armoured Corps.
- Captain William Leslie Hemmings (E.C.10160), Indian Army.
- Major (temporary) Clarence Albert Henderson (123641V), Union Defence Force.
- Lieutenant-Colonel (temporary) Kenneth Duff Henderson (79045), Royal Regiment of Artillery.
- Captain (temporary) Cyril James Hendry (261494), Corps of Royal Engineers.
- Lieutenant-Colonel (acting) Edward Cecil Quixano Henriques (275743), Army Cadet Force.
- Major (temporary) James Peter Herd (88213), The Black Watch (Royal Highland Regiment).
- Captain (temporary) John Cyril Heywood (229480), The Manchester Regiment.
- Senior Commander (temporary) The Honourable Diana Holland-Hibbert (216977), Auxiliary Territorial Service.
- No 6398407 Warrant Officer Class I Frank Hill, The Royal Sussex Regiment.
- The Reverend George Hilton (104220), Chaplain to the Forces, 4th Class, Royal Army Chaplains' Department.
- Major (temporary) George Hind (253603), General List.
- Captain (temporary) Ian Reginald Hoar (66215), The Hampshire Regiment.
- Major (temporary) Frank Martin Carrington Hobson (333524), General List, Infantry.
- Major (temporary) Frederick Arthur Burnett Hodd (222855), Royal Electrical and Mechanical Engineers.
- Captain (Quartermaster) Philip Henry Hodges (E.C.5524), 14th Punjab Regiment, Indian Army.
- No 4970512 Warrant Officer Class I Edward George Holland, The Sherwood Foresters (Nottinghamshire and Derbyshire Regiment).
- No 390330 Warrant Officer Class I Alexander Hollick, ARCM, The Royal Northumberland Fusiliers.
- Major (temporary) Robert Charles Homer (E.C.530), Indian Army.
- Major (temporary) William John Hopkins (195872), General List, Infantry.
- Major (temporary) Stanley Hopwood (E.C.515), Indian Army Ordnance Corps.
- Captain (temporary) Charles William Henry Horrell (E.C.8661), "Special List" of Quartermasters of the Indian Army.
- Captain (temporary) Geoffrey Farnell Horsfall (166514), Corps of Royal Engineers.
- Major (temporary) Norman Allen Hughes (47768), Corps of Royal Engineers.
- Captain (temporary) Hukam Chand Jaggi (I.E.C.863), Indian Army.
- Captain (temporary) Hussein Bin Onn (1150), [[19th Hyderabad Regiment]], Indian Army.
- Major (temporary) Frederick Hutchinson (166953), Royal Regiment of Artillery.
- Captain (temporary) Peter Vernon Icke (106714), Royal Army Service Corps.
- Major (temporary) Ian Goodwyn Inch (148628), The Queen's Own Cameron Highlanders.
- Captain Ivar Herbert Ingleby (96090), The Royal Fusiliers (City of London Regiment).
- Major (temporary) Archibald Ernest Smith Jackson (161567), Royal Corps of Signals.
- Captain (temporary) Donald Eades James (194810), Royal Regiment of Artillery.
- Captain (temporary) Ernest Jameson (303030), The Manchester Regiment.
- Major (temporary) Eric Jaques (150109), Royal Army Ordnance Corps.
- Junior Commander (temporary) Edith Kate Johns, Women's Auxiliary Corps (India).
- Captain (temporary) William Henry Johns (265762), Corps of Royal Engineers.
- Major James Aubrey Johnstone, lately Second in Command, Solomon Islands Labour Corps.
- Major James Spencer Douglas Montford Johnstone (300315V), Union Defence Force.
- Captain (Quartermaster) Henry John Jones (259736), Royal Armoured Corps.
- Major (temporary) Stuart Jones (190464), Royal Armoured Corps.
- Lieutenant-Colonel Kanwar Bagh Singhji, Bikaner State Forces, Indian States Forces.
- Major (temporary) Leslie Thomas Kay (159733), The Sherwood Foresters (Nottinghamshire and Derbyshire Regiment).
- Captain William F. Kerr (190205), The Cameronians (Scottish Rifles).
- Captain (temporary) Khan Bahadur Mohamed Walait Khan, Recruiting Staff, Indian Army.
- Major (temporary) Khan Sahib Shabaz Khan (I.E.C.7655), Indian Army.
- Jemadar Kharak Bahadur Limbu, 2nd King Edward VII's Own Gurkha Rifles, Indian Army.
- No 2695239 Warrant Officer Class I Samuel Kilpatrick, Scots Guards.
- Major (temporary) Stanley Lawrence Kirk, PASI (234576), Corps of Royal Engineers.
- No 3124852 Warrant Officer Class I Robert James Kirke, The Royal Scots Fusiliers.
- Captain (temporary) Stanley Frederick Knight (163266), Corps of Royal Engineers.
- Lieutenant-Colonel (temporary) William James Knott (14914), Army Educational Corps.
- No 2568416 Warrant Officer Class II Thomas William Langham, Royal Corps of Signals.
- Major (temporary) Cyril Michael Lavington (200052), Royal Army Service Corps.
- Senior Commander (temporary) Esme McLeod Lawrance (196049), Auxiliary Territorial Service.
- Lieutenant Leonard William Lee, ARCM (356228), General List.
- Major (temporary) Andrew Franklin Leslie (125178), Corps of Royal Engineers.
- Major (temporary) Paul Rooke-Ley (132188), The South Lancashire Regiment (The Prince of Wales's Volunteers).
- No 1866176 Warrant Officer Class II William Edward Lonsdale, Corps of Royal Engineers.
- Major (temporary) Charles Victory Lyon (MES 87/F), Indian Engineers.
- Major (temporary) Hugh Douglas Macdougall (179646), Corps of Royal Engineers.
- Senior Commander (temporary) Constance Gertrude Machin (196921), Auxiliary Territorial Service.
- Captain Alexander Downie Mackay, PASI (188012), Corps of Royal Engineers.
- Senior Commander (temporary) Margaret Ann Macleod (W.A.C.563), Women's Army Auxiliary Corps (India).
- Major (temporary) Robert George Madocks (174466), The North Staffordshire Regiment (The Prince of Wales's).
- Captain (Quartermaster) Percy Mangion (115152), Royal Malta Artillery.
- Major (temporary) Lewis John Mann (O.S.92), Indian Army Ordnance Corps.
- No 5349551 Warrant Officer Class I Brian Alexander Marcar, Royal Army Service Corps (attached Indian Army Corps of Clerks).
- Captain (Quartermaster) James Black Marshall (134791), The King's Own Scottish Borderers.
- Major (temporary) John Charles Marshall (71679), Royal Regiment of Artillery.
- Lieutenant (Quartermaster) Cyril Martin (358637), Royal Regiment of Artillery.
- Major (temporary) William Herbert Martin (E.C.5615), 5th Mahratta Light Infantry, Indian Army.
- Major (temporary) Bernard Charles Massey (225973), Intelligence Corps.
- No 7912679 Warrant Officer Class I (acting) Charles Massey, Royal Tank Regiment, Royal Armoured Corps.
- No 7585737 Warrant Officer Class I Francis Eldred Matthews, Royal Electrical and Mechanical Engineers.
- Lieutenant-Colonel (temporary) Royston Henry Matthews (E.C.737), Indian Engineers.
- Major (temporary) Alexander James McBean (O.S.105), Indian Army Ordnance Corps.
- Major (temporary) Desmond Graham McConnell, MB (291376), Royal Army Medical Corps.
- Major (temporary) Alexander McIntosh (132305), Royal Corps of Signals.
- Major (temporary) Robert McKinlay (238784), Corps of Royal Engineers.
- Captain (Quartermaster) George Ernest Meads (143618), The Dorsetshire Regiment.
- Captain (temporary) Archibald Crease Meaker (149743), Royal Regiment of Artillery.
- Lieutenant-Colonel (temporary) William Mee (O.S.66), Indian Army Ordnance Corps.
- Major (temporary) Stanley Alfred Meer (O.W.81), Indian Electrical and Mechanical Engineers.
- Major (temporary) Kantichandra Manubhai Mehta (I.E.C.1101), Indian Army.
- Major (temporary) Palakkal Karunakara Menon (E.C.862), Indian Army.
- Captain (temporary) Frederick Eden Metcalfe (294587), Pioneer Corps.
- Major (temporary) John Joseph Milburn (67399), Royal Corps of Signals.
- Major (acting) Maurice Albert Mills (308757), General List.
- Major (temporary) Wilfred Alfred Reginald Mills (297369), Royal Army Service Corps.
- Captain (temporary) William Hylton Milner (162016), The King's Regiment (Liverpool).
- Subedar Major Mohammed Afzal Khan (104247), 15th Punjab Regiment, Indian Army.
- Captain Mohan Sing (I.E.C.O.1429), Indian Armoured Corps.
- No 2653115 Warrant Officer Class I (acting) William Arthur Monument, The King's Own Yorkshire Light Infantry.
- Lieutenant-Colonel (temporary) John Andrew Moran, Indian Army Ordnance Corps.
- Captain (temporary) Moti Lal (M.Z.20944), Indian Army Medical Corps.
- No 5669773 Warrant Officer Class I Jack Stephen Walter Mounter, The Somerset Light Infantry (Prince Albert's).
- Major (temporary) Bijohn Mukerji (I.E.C.6398), Indian Army Postal Service.
- Major James Allan Mulholland, MC (38946), Pioneer Corps.
- Major (temporary) John Edward Mumford (179303), Royal Regiment of Artillery.
- Lieutenant-Colonel (temporary) William Bevan Roseveare Mumford (E.C.3663), Indian Engineers.
- Major (temporary) Arthur Henry Murdoch (05293), Indian Army Ordnance Corps.
- Subaltern Joan Ellen Mary Murphy (223125), Auxiliary Territorial Service.
- Major (temporary) Duncan Mutch (182110), Royal Corps of Signals.
- Captain Cherukat Padmanabham Nair (M.13061), Indian Army Medical Corps.
- Major (temporary) David Hartopp Nash (111705), Royal Army Ordnance Corps.
- No 3767850 Warrant Officer Class I Thomas Christopher Nash, Military Provost Staff Corps.
- Captain (temporary) Nawabzada Syed Bahadur Murtaza Ali Khan, 1st Punjab Regiment, Indian Army.
- Major (temporary) David John Frederick Beaumont-Nesbitt (69090), Grenadier Guards.
- Captain (temporary) William Francis Lister Newcombe (78756), Royal Regiment of Artillery.
- Major (temporary) William Edward Northed (229127), Royal Regiment of Artillery.
- Lieutenant-Colonel (temporary) Rudolph Montague O'Dowd (I.E.3527), Indian Engineers.
- Warrant Officer Class I John Lionel Ogden, Indian Army Medical Corps.
- Major (acting) William Sheard Brearley Oldroyd (241403), Royal Army Service Corps/Expeditionary Force Institutes.
- Major (temporary) John James O'Sullivan (223343), Intelligence Corps.
- Major (temporary) Joseph Carr Oversby (121755), The West Yorkshire Regiment (The Prince of Wales's Own).
- Subedar Major (acting) Padmath Narayanan Nair (I.O.1337), Indian Artillery.
- Captain (temporary) Leonard Frederick Parker (293487), Royal Armoured Corps.
- Major (temporary) Reginald Vernon Parker (156354), The Green Howards (Alexandra, Princess of Wales's Own Yorkshire Regiment).
- Major (temporary) Eric Robert Paterson (77558), Corps of Royal Engineers.
- Major (temporary) James Paterson Gordon Paterson (104907), Royal Army Ordnance Corps.
- Lieutenant Cecil Vowe Peake (130033), Corps of Royal Engineers.
- Major (temporary) William Dishington Scott Pearson (92265), Royal Regiment of Artillery.
- No 2134011 Warrant Officer Class II Howard Richard Peirce, Corps of Royal Engineers.
- Major (temporary) Richard Collier Peltzer (88759), The East Lancashire Regiment.
- Captain (temporary) Allen Whitmore Perry (291693), Royal Electrical and Mechanical Engineers.
- Major (acting) Edwin William Phillips (105117), Royal Armoured Corps.
- Captain (temporary) Henry David Phillips (284234), Royal Army Ordnance Corps.
- Lieutenant (Quartermaster) Arthur Pickering (356958), Royal Regiment of Artillery.
- Major (temporary) John Pickering (E.C.2825) 15th Punjab Regiment, Indian Army.
- Captain (Quartermaster) Ronald Douglas Pitt (254703), 4th Queen's Own Hussars, Royal Armoured Corps.
- No 6188757 Warrant Officer Class I Denis James Plater, LRAM, ARCM, Royal Tank Regiment, Royal Armoured Corps.
- Captain (Quartermaster) George William Thomas Plumbridge (76817), Royal Regiment of Artillery.
- Major (temporary) Austin Melville Lawrence Price (E.C.185), 3rd Queen Alexandra's Own Gurkha Rifles, Indian Army.
- Captain (Quartermaster) William Arthur Benson Priestley (E.C.4449), Corps of Indian Engineers.
- Major (temporary) George Bertram Quale (E.C.5903), Royal Indian Army Service Corps.
- Major (temporary) Herbert Arthur Farrand Radley (156365), The Lancashire Fusiliers.
- Major (temporary) Rai Sahib Pera Ram (I.E.C.844), Indian Engineers.
- Subedar Major Rajtnder Singh (I.O.9483), 15th Punjab Regiment, Indian Army.
- Major (temporary) Norman Gay Ralph (97720), Royal Regiment of Artillery.
- Lieutenant-Colonel Ram Singh Brar, Nabha State Forces, Indian State Forces.
- Senior Commander (temporary) Marjorie Christian Ranking, Women's Auxiliary Corps (India).
- Major Rao Rajah Abhey Singh of Jodhpur (E.C.1427), Indian Army.
- Major (temporary) Cyril Ernest Raphael (119461), Coldstream Guards.
- Major (temporary) George Frank Norman Reddaway (117410), Reconnaissance Corps, Royal Armoured Corps.
- Major (temporary) James Roland Redding (167447), Royal Regiment of Artillery.
- No 5950322 Warrant Officer Class I (acting) Joseph Redman, The Bedfordshire and Hertfordshire Regiment.
- Lieutenant-Colonel (temporary) Kenneth Storey Brunton-Reed (79480), Royal Regiment of Artillery.
- Major (temporary) David William Reid, BA (49923), Corps of Royal Engineers.
- Captain (temporary) William Peter Reid (185972), General List, Infantry.
- Captain William Richey (E.C.14855), Indian Army.
- Major William John Ritchie (53424), Army Educational Corps.
- No S/205618 Warrant Officer Class I (acting) Evan James Roberts, Royal Army Service Corps.
- Major (temporary) Leslie George Robertson (E.C.10083), Indian Engineers.
- Major (temporary) Stanley Ewart Robins (E.C.8179), Royal Indian Army Service Corps.
- Lieutenant-Colonel (temporary) Frederick Graham Robinson (I.A.1290), Indian Electrical and Mechanical Engineers.
- Lieutenant-Colonel (temporary) Harold Boyd-Rochfort, DSO, MC (42571), 17th/21st Lancers, Royal Armoured Corps.
- Major (temporary) Ian Barnet Rodger (198036), Royal Corps of Signals.
- Major (temporary) William Ross (217455), Royal Corps of Signals.
- Major (temporary) Arthur Albert Jesse Salmon (220315), Royal Army Ordnance Corps.
- Captain Charles Frederick Hinsby Sandell (131154), The Rifle Brigade (Prince Consort's Own).
- Major (temporary) William Hamilton Sanders (227114), Corps of Royal Engineers.
- Major Sardar Jai Singh, The Kumaon Regiment, Indian Army.
- Major (temporary) Phillip Harold Sargison (184161), General List.
- No W/7436 Warrant Officer Class I Constance Mary Savage, Auxiliary Territorial Service.
- No 3771201 Warrant Officer Class I (acting) Walter Savage, The Lancashire Fusiliers.
- Captain (temporary) John Sewell (353893), Royal Army Service Corps.
- Risaldar Major Sham Dass Dutta, Bahadur, OBI (V.704), Indian Army Veterinary Corps.
- Jemadar Shantilal Malhotra (I.O.42714), Indian Army Corps of Clerks.
- No 3525651 Warrant Officer Class II Edwin William Shepherd, The Manchester Regiment.
- Major (temporary) Alan Bering Singer (181472), Corps of Royal Engineers.
- Captain William George Smallwood (254202), Royal Corps of Signals.
- Captain (temporary) Charles William Smart (301179), The Somerset Light Infantry (Prince Albert's).
- No 315648 Warrant Officer Class I Kenneth Cyril Smart, 12th Royal Lancers (Prince of Wales's), Royal Armoured Corps.
- Captain (temporary) William Smart (282892), Corps of Royal Engineers.
- Major (temporary) Alexander George Sidney Smith (63385), The Border Regiment.
- No 2320417 Warrant Officer Class I George Smith, Royal Electrical and Mechanical Engineers (attached Indian Electrical and Mechanical Engineers).
- Major (temporary) Iain Alasdair Graham Horton-Smith (197288), The Gordon Highlanders.
- Lieutenant-Colonel (temporary) Norman Sherrard Smith (E.C.13774), Indian Army Postal Service.
- Major (temporary) Reginald John Smith (274927), General List, Infantry.
- Major (temporary) Edward Harvey Ratcliffe Smithard, MD (342072), Royal Army Medical Corps.
- Major (temporary) Harold Frederick Kynaston-Snell (221420), General List.
- Lieutenant (AC) Leonard Snowden (C.C.322), Indian Army Corps of Clerks.
- Captain Arthur Ernest Solly (150047), Royal Regiment of Artillery.
- Major (temporary) David Bower Solomon (185536), Corps of Royal Engineers.
- No S/11155087 Warrant Officer Class II Arthur James Somerton, Royal Army Service Corps, Headquarters, Chief Civil Affairs Officer, Malaya.
- Captain (temporary) John Cooper Somerville (227675), Corps of Royal Engineers.
- No W/85383 Warrant Officer Class I (acting) Gertrude South, Auxiliary Territorial Service.
- Major Francis Arnold Southam (1180), Special List of Quartermasters of the Indian Army.
- Major (temporary) Reginald Robert Newell Spencer (247058), The York and Lancaster Regiment.
- Captain (Quartermaster) Reginald Spry (250526), Coldstream Guards.
- Major (temporary) John Latham Stanton (106107), The Devonshire Regiment.
- Captain (temporary) Dennis Jones Staples (E.C.8471), 19th King George V's Own Lancers, Indian Armoured Corps.
- No 1868431 Warrant Officer Class I (acting) Thomas George Stephens, Corps of Royal Engineers.
- Major (temporary) Frederick William Stevens (174977), The Royal Fusiliers (City of London Regiment).
- Major (temporary) John Arthur Bland Stimpson (179931), 12th Royal Lancers (Prince of Wales's), Royal Armoured Corps.
- Senior Commander (temporary) Patricia Rhoda Stones (238907), Auxiliary Territorial Service.
- No 316265 Warrant Officer Class II William Leonard Street, Royal Armoured Corps.
- No S/214226 Warrant Officer Class I Edmund John Suffolk, Royal Army Service Corps.
- Lieutenant (Quartermaster) Albert Summerfield (355639), General List.
- Major (temporary) Charles William Swarbreck (202403), Corps of Royal Engineers.
- Major (temporary) Edmund Lacy Taverner (116523), Royal Regiment of Artillery.
- Captain (temporary) Aubrey Taylor (348501), General List.
- Lieutenant-Colonel (temporary) Geoffrey Whitworth Taylor (E.C.2581), Indian Army.
- No S/54038 Warrant Officer Class II Robert Arnold Taylor, Royal Army Service Corps.
- Major (temporary) Steven Percival Thomas (220229), Royal Regiment of Artillery.
- No W/6508 Warrant Officer Class II Agnes Thompson, Auxiliary Territorial Service.
- Captain Frank Wilfred George Thompson (358064), Extra Regimentally Employed List.
- Major (temporary) Frederick Arthur Thompson (E.C.16158), Indian Ecclesiastical Establishment.
- Junior Commander (temporary) Phyllis Margaret Thompson (W.A.C.579), Women's Auxiliary Corps (India).
- Surgeon Captain James White Thomson, British Guiana Garrison.
- No 6282477 Warrant Officer Class I Richard John Townsend, The Royal Fusiliers (City of London Regiment).
- Major Dennis George Harmsworth Tuite (31615), Corps of Royal Engineers.
- Major (temporary) Nigel Henry Lewis Round-Turner (7583), The Lincolnshire Regiment.
- Lieutenant-Colonel (acting) Aubery Barrington Charles Tutton (O.S.427), Indian Army Ordnance Corps.
- No 4741048 Warrant Officer Class I (acting) Frederick Tweedy, Small Arms School Corps.
- Major (temporary) John Tyler (330588), General List.
- Major (temporary) Umedbhai Sharkerbhai Amin (I.E.C.7O65), Indian Army.
- No 6137370 Warrant Officer Class I Norman James Vanner, Royal Army Ordnance Corps.
- Major (Commissary) James William Vining (M.F.D.3), Indian Army.
- Major (temporary) Leonard Joseph Oliver Walker (180521), The Queen's Royal Regiment (West Surrey).
- Major (temporary Anthony Cyril Wall (168136), Royal Army Ordnance Corps.
- No 2312172 Warrant Officer Class I John Walsh, Royal Corps of Signals.
- Lieutenant-Colonel (temporary) Richard Walsh, MM (O.S.229), Indian Army Ordnance Corps.
- Major (temporary) Clarence Lane Walters (O.S.104), Indian Army Ordnance Corps.
- Major (temporary) William Cecil Walters (345414), Royal Army Medical Corps.
- Major (temporary) Michael Joseph Ward (181303), General List.
- Major (temporary) Harold John William Warman (150095), Royal Army Pay Corps.
- Major (temporary) Sydney James Warren (229026), Royal Regiment of Artillery.
- Senior Commander (temporary) Doreen Warters (W.A.C.64), Women's Auxiliary Corps (India).
- Major (temporary) Joseph Stanley Watson (138375), Royal Regiment of Artillery.
- Captain (temporary) Philip Ernest Watson (188482), Corps of Royal Engineers.
- Major (temporary) John Desmond Weaver (198506), Royal Army Service Corps.
- Major (temporary) Harry Webber (141147), Corps of Royal Engineers.
- Major (temporary) Peter Augustine Howard Welch (168297), Pioneer Corps.
- Major (temporary) William Henry Weller (08174), Indian Army Ordnance Corps.
- No 6664987 Warrant Officer Class I Archibald Charles White, Royal Electrical and Mechanical Engineers.
- Junior Commander (temporary) Sheila Whitmarsh, Women's Auxiliary Corps (India).
- Major Bernard Justin Wijemanne (164), Ceylon Light Infantry.
- Major (temporary) Henry Barker Wildish (136109), General List.
- Major (temporary) Charles Beaton Wilken (91637), The Seaforth Highlanders (Ross-shire Buffs, The Duke of Albany's).
- Major (temporary) Charles Llewelyn Glynn Williams (E.C.1230), Skinner's Horse, Indian Armoured Corps.
- Major (temporary) Donald Arthur Herbert Williams (132856), Royal Regiment of Artillery.
- Major (temporary) Gwylmor Prys Williams (102721), Royal Army Service Corps.
- Captain Richard Ivor Williams (266426), Royal Army Medical Corps.
- Major (temporary) Allan David Read Wilson (E.C.929), 3rd Cavalry, Indian Armoured Corps.
- Major (temporary) Arthur Garnett Wilson (199733), Royal Army Ordnance Corps.
- No 546756 Warrant Officer Class II Samuel Wilson, Royal Armoured Corps.
- Captain (DC) Waltair George Wilson (M.E.S.8), Indian Engineers.
- Captain (temporary) Ercom Bert Winckler (E.C.15889), Indian Engineers.
- No 2182467 Warrant Officer Class II James Kenneth Woodward, Corps of Royal Engineers.
- Junior Commander (temporary) Lesley Maxwell Garden Wooldridge (W.A.C.115), Women's Auxiliary Corps (India).
- No 7617170 Warrant Officer Class II Leonard Woolley, Royal Electrical and Mechanical Engineers.
- Major John Worrall (C.C.69), Indian Army Corps of Clerks.
- Major (temporary) Edward Vere Wright (156007), 1st East Riding Yeomanry, Royal Armoured Corps.
- Major (temporary) Frederick Matthew Wright (190446), Corps of Royal Engineers.
- No 7584559 Warrant Officer Class I Kenneth Wright, Royal Electrical and Mechanical Engineers.
- Junior Commander (temporary) Marjorie Anne Collins Wyde (234150), Auxiliary Territorial Service.
- No 1874245 Warrant Officer Class I Wilfred Maurice Yeates, Corps of Royal Engineers.
- Captain (temporary) Benjamin Young (251234), The Queen's Royal Regiment (West Surrey).
- No S/244523 Warrant Officer Class I Thomas Charles Yoxall, Royal Army Service Corps.
- Lieutenant-Colonel (temporary) Norman Alfred Zoller (E.C.3661), Indian Engineers.
- Captain (temporary) Zorawar Singh (I.E.C.2039), Indian Army.

Royal Air Force

- Wing Commander Thomas John Kinna (31042).
- Acting Wing Commander Frank Thomas Harris (77546), RAFVR.
- Acting Wing Commander Herbert Cecil Reade (73056), RAFVR.
- Squadron Leader Wilfred Henson (100255), RAFVR.
- Squadron Leader Cyril William Hyslop (80176), Southern Rhodesian Air Force.
- Squadron Leader Herbert Jordan Posselt (89334), Southern Rhodesian Air Force.
- Squadron Leader Wilfred Augustus Prichard, MC (78249), RAFVR.
- Squadron Leader William Robertson (44351).
- The Reverend Joseph Cowan Harkus (77268), RAFVR.
- The Reverend Kenneth Slack (131921), RAFVR.
- Acting Squadron Leader James William Adderley (105579), RAFVR.
- Acting Squadron Leader Wyvil August (89119), RAFVR.
- Acting Squadron Leader Richard Beard (82849), RAFVR.
- Acting Squadron Leader Amos Binfield (124058), RAFVR.
- Acting Squadron Leader Lionel Frost Bruce (108590), RAFVR.
- Acting Squadron Leader Alexander Fairley Buchan (63309), RAFVR.
- Acting Squadron Leader Harold Robert Bunn (44346).
- Acting Squadron Leader Arthur Frederick Bulgin (105086), RAFVR.
- Acting Squadron Leader Reginald George Burnett (88759), RAFVR.
- Acting Squadron Leader Sachiandra Nath Chuckerbutty (Ind.2758), Royal Indian Air Force.
- Acting Squadron Leader Leslie Clarke, AFC (62488), RAFVR.
- Acting Squadron Leader Albert Edward Cooper (127459), RAFVR.
- Acting Squadron Leader Frederick James Crane (45477).
- Acting Squadron Leader Thomas Anderson Davis (65236), RAFVR.
- Acting Squadron Leader Geoffrey Arthur Reginald Green (79896), RAFVR.
- Acting Squadron Leader Henry Henssee (132880), RAFVR.
- Acting Squadron Leader Frank Honey (88948), RAFVR.
- Acting Squadron Leader Alfred Richard Jeffery (89228), RAFVR.
- Acting Squadron Leader Horace Frederick King (82119), RAFVR.
- Acting Squadron Leader Mangho Jeramdas Kirpalani (Ind.2395), Royal Indian Air Force.
- Acting Squadron Leader Edward John Bailey Langhorne (91169), Auxiliary Air Force.
- Acting Squadron Leader Charles William Mann (105923), RAFVR.
- Acting Squadron Leader Edwin Felix Mason (63396), RAFVR.
- Acting Squadron Leader Douglas Gordon Moffitt (120232), RAFVR.
- Acting Squadron Leader John Alexander Mowat (64794), RAFVR.
- Acting Squadron Leader Laurence Edward Mansfield Price (64515), RAFVR.
- Acting Squadron Leader Thomas Roberts (43741).
- Acting Squadron Leader Leonard Pritchard Robinson (86509), RAFVR.
- Acting Squadron Leader Hasan Shamsie (Ind.1591), Royal Indian Air Force.
- Acting Squadron Leader Said-Ud-Din (Ind.1698), Royal Indian Air Force.
- Acting Squadron Leader George Smythe, DFM (47752).
- Acting Squadron Leader Derek Ray Squier (63240), RAFVR.
- Acting Squadron Leader Cooper Hodgson Thompson (137726), RAFVR.
- Acting Squadron Leader Gnarles Edmund Trott (60005), RAFVR.
- Acting Squadron Leader Arthur Vicary (45414).
- Acting Squadron Leader Francis Austin Wheatley (119970), RAFVR.
- Acting Squadron Leader Frederick Charles Woolley (44100).
- Flight Lieutenant Charles Ronald Alexander, DFM (44461).
- Flight Lieutenant Frank Dorrien Andrews (62732), RAFVR.
- Flight Lieutenant Eric Ernest Barber (118670), RAFVR.
- Flight Lieutenant Herbert Thomas Brown (107397), RAFVR.
- Flight Lieutenant Ian Donald (121388), RAFVR.
- Flight Lieutenant Cecil Morley Feugard (67151), RAFVR.
- Flight Lieutenant James Herbert Flitcroft (88840), RAFVR.
- Flight Lieutenant Walter William Lee, DFC (52402).
- Flight Lieutenant Henry Liley (61985), RAFVR.
- Flight Lieutenant Daniel John Hyslop Morrison (121819), RAFVR.
- Flight Lieutenant Nicholas Nathan Nichols (105308), RAFVR.
- Flight Lieutenant Richard Brown Patterson (148976), RAFVR.
- Flight Lieutenant John William Simpson Smith (119312), RAFVR.
- Flight Lieutenant Wallace Edgar Thorpe (45405).
- Flight Lieutenant Joseph Francis Viveash (47977).
- Flight Lieutenant Leonard Whittington (66714), RAFVR.
- Acting Flight Lieutenant Ian Arrol (132918), RAFVR.
- Acting Flight Lieutenant Morris Barnett (182044), RAFVR.
- Acting Flight Lieutenant Thomas Vincent John Boughton (51429).
- Acting Flight Lieutenant Reginald John Hegan Buttanshaw (103074), RAFVR.
- Acting Flight Lieutenant Donald Henry Fraser (113178), RAFVR.
- Acting Flight Lieutenant Cyril Leslie Harris (47636).
- Acting Flight Lieutenant Thomas Reginald Hearns (138187), RAFVR.
- Acting Flight Lieutenant William Magnus Jamieson (54071).
- Acting Flight Lieutenant Philip William Jevons (105243), RAFVR.
- Acting Flight Lieutenant Douglas Sloan Leitch (111445), RAFVR.
- Acting Flight Lieutenant Herbert Miller (170683), RAFVR.
- Acting Flight Lieutenant Herbert Francis Drake Monk (65320), RAFVR.
- Acting Flight Lieutenant Frank Douglas Nicol (108737), RAFVR.
- Acting Flight Lieutenant William Henry Robinson (103969), RAFVR.
- Acting Flight Lieutenant Edward Clive Rouse (108864), RAFVR.
- Acting Flight Lieutenant Aubrey Reginald Scrope-Davies (100155), RAFVR.
- Acting Flight Lieutenant Ram Narain Sharma (Ind.2012), Royal Indian Air Force.
- Acting Flight Lieutenant Ralph Simpson (110272), Royal Ak Force Volunteer Reserve.
- Acting Flight Lieutenant Charles Edward Arthur Templeman (104030), RAFVR.
- Acting Flight Lieutenant Stanley Philip Wand (48043).
- Flying Officer Arnold Morris (53394).
- Flying Officer Ram Singh (Ind.2249), Royal Indian Air Force.
- Warrant Officer George Thurlow Barrett (590353).
- Warrant Officer John Bower (370974).
- Warrant Officer William Henry Burdett (4054).
- Warrant Officer Edgar Whittaker Burrow (505255).
- Warrant Officer Frederick Charles Thomas Chesterfield (354630).
- Warrant Officer Ronald Coleby (506637).
- Warrant Officer Basil Louis Coward (514493).
- Warrant Officer Paul Ebblewhite (936236), RAFVR.
- Warrant Officer Alexander Samuel Kerr (356238) Royal Air Force.
- Warrant Officer Andrew Frederick McCarthy (534801).
- Warrant Officer John Robertson Milne (590766).
- Warrant Officer Henry Albert Parkinson (5107311.
- Warrant Officer Sidney Thomas Pitcher (505910).
- Warrant Officer John Joseph Reynolds (514404).
- Warrant Officer Byron Arthur Alfred Snook (591019).
- Warrant Officer Thomas Douglas Stobart (343361).
- Warrant Officer Albert Edward Sturgess (Can.1011), Royal Canadian Air Force.
- Warrant Officer William Aubrey Venables (591027).
- Warrant Officer Alfred Watkins (506534).
- Warrant Officer Frederick John Horace Wood (590940).
- Warrant Officer Kenneth William Woods (591067).
- Acting Warrant Officer Joseph Clark (591073).
- Acting Warrant Officer Walter Coldrick (646178).
- Acting Warrant Officer Albert Derek Harvey (591388).
- Acting Warrant Officer Reginald Joseph Henry Pike (516281).
- Acting Warrant Officer Robert Robertson (591116).
- Squadron Officer Phyllis Margaret De Fraine (132), Women's Auxiliary Air Force.
- Squadron Officer Marjorie Rutherford-Jones (710), WAAF.
- Acting Squadron Officer Mabel Doris George (2477), WAAF.
- Acting Squadron Officer Agnes Maude Jones (2437), WAAF.
- Acting Squadron Officer Maie Lillie Hamilton Seales (2377), WAAF.
- Acting Squadron Officer Mary Margaret Wade (48), WAAF.
- Captain Coralie Marie Pincott (F.263812(V)), South African WAAF.
- Acting Flight Officer Ina May Radigund Eliot (2882), WAAF.
- Acting Flight Officer Patricia Kepple (5439), WAAF.
- Acting Flight Officer Madeline Mary Robinson (6774), WAAF.
- Acting Flight Officer Jean Alison Tod (4861), WAAF.
- Acting Senior Sister Nancy Sinclair Teed (5081), Princess Mary's Royal Air Force Nursing Service.

Civil Division

- Alexander Akras. British subject and British Vice-Consul at Aleppo.
- Isabel Anderson, Matron of the Demerdash Hospital, Cairo.
- Beatrice Margaret Ash, Assistant at the British Bureau of Information in Havana.
- Herbert Robert Fear Brett. Head Clerk to Air Attaché at His Majesty's Embassy at Washington.
- Randle Martin Mainwaring Brett. British Vice-Consul at Suez.
- Henry Francis Buckeridge. British Post Master at Tangier.
- Jessie Frances Ann Burnett, British subject resident in China.
- William Charles Collett. Until recently on the staff of His Majesty's Embassy at Lisbon.
- Horace James Dorey. British Vice-Consul in the Consular Section of His Majesty's Embassy at Paris.
- Margaret Drower, British subject resident in Iraq.
- Ralph Henry Haven-Dyke. Civil Assistant to the Air Attaché at His Majesty's Embassy at Buenos Aires.
- Arthur James Evans. Acting Consul at His Majesty's Consulate-General at Shanghai.
- Winifred Fitzpatrick, British subject resident in France.
- Captain Thomas Hall Frame. Attached to the Foreign Office/State Department Documents Unit in Germany.
- Thomas Fulton. British subject resident in Turkey.
- William Hair. Accountant at His Majesty's Embassy at Moscow.
- Reginald John Hill. British subject resident in Greece.
- James Finlay Gordon Hogg. British Vice-Consul at Iquique.
- Clarence Charles Horton. British subject resident in Uruguay.
- Arthur Percival Hughes. British Vice Consul at Mexico City.
- Major Laurent Mortimore, British subject resident in Portugal.
- Cyril Ousman. British Vice-Consul at Jeddah.
- Donald Gray Phelps. British subject resident in Persia.
- Charles Verner Salin, attached to a Department of the Foreign Office. For service abroad.
- Cecil Irving Smith. Assistant to the Press Attaché at His Majesty's Legation at Panama.
- David Maitland Makgill Crichton Somerville, British Vice-Consul at His Majesty's Consulate-General at Gothenburg.
- John Melville Tabor. A clerical officer on the staff of the Political Adviser to Supreme Allied Commander, South East Asia.
- Wilfred Lewis Thomas. A Senior Staff Officer employed at His Majesty's Embassy at Washington.
- Reginald Henry Traviss. Assistant in the Commercial Section of His Majesty's Legation at Stockholm.
- Eliza Emma Walmsley, British subject resident in China.
- Charles Stuart Young. British subject resident in Persia.
- Mildred Alice Blackburn, Secretary, Red Cross Emergency Services, State of South Australia.
- Mabel Margaret Boast. For valuable services in connection with War Funds at Pigg's Peak and Stegi, Swaziland.
- Ida Isabelle Calpin, Clerk, Grade II, Department of Natural Resources, Newfoundland.
- Elizabeth Hill Cochrane, Voluntary Lady Director of the Royal Exchange Club, Glasgow, under the auspices of the Empire Societies' War Hospitality Committee.
- Elizabeth Craig. For services in connection with hospitality to oversea forces in Scotland.
- Faith Marjory Crocker, Convenor of the Packing Committee, Women's Patriotic Association, Newfoundland.
- Kathleen Maude De Garis, lately Mayoress of Naracoorte, State of South Australia.
- Christopher Bertram Dicks, Accountant, Department of Public Works, Newfoundland.
- Jessie Mary Drummond. For services in connection with hospitality to oversea forces in Scotland.
- Elizabeth Elliot. For services in Basutoland in connection with war charities and the South African Women's Auxiliary Services.
- Leo Edward Francis English, travelling lecturer and navigation teacher, Adult Education Division, Department of Education, Newfoundland.
- Mary Green, Director of Departmental Nurses, Newfoundland.
- Solomon Samuel Grossberg, of Bulawayo, Southern Rhodesia. For services in connection with benevolent and social welfare movements.
- Minnie Bertha Hanson. For services in connection with patriotic movements in Newfoundland.
- Alfred Ernest Hart, Manager of the Vocational Training Centre, Newfoundland, and formerly Administrative Officer, Newfoundland Oversea Forestry Unit.
- Catherine Hill, Honorary Secretary of the Bulawayo branch, Women's National Service League, Southern Rhodesia.
- John Janes, a school teacher at Robinsons, Newfoundland, for many years.
- Marjorie Maud Jeeves, Manageress of the Hopkinson House Club under the auspices of the Victoria League.
- Linda Mary Kroekel. For social welfare services especially to the Coloured Community in Southern Rhodesia.
- Albert Edward Lamb, Hansard writer, Legislative Assembly, Southern Rhodesia.
- Linda Glen Leary. For valuable services in connection with the South African Women's Auxiliary Service and particularly with arrangements for hospitality for Royal Air Force men on leave in Swaziland.
- Ina Dorothy Lessells. For services to the Empire Societies War Hospitality Committee in Scotland.
- Michael Paul Mahoney, Head Constable, Newfoundland.
- Violet Gladys Morris, Chief Accountant, Victoria League.
- Marjorie Hester Annesley Norris, Assistant Secretary, Mitford House Club, under the auspices of the Victoria League.
- James Joseph O'Reilly, Chief Warden, Civil Defence Service, Newfoundland.
- Cuthbert Beryl Pretious, Accountant, Treasury, Basutoland.
- Robert Fleming Rankin, Accountant, Treasury, Swaziland.
- Frank Thomas Russell, Social Security Officer, Southern Rhodesia.
- Francis Joseph Ryan. For services to the Auxiliary Fire Service, Newfoundland, during the war.
- Minnie Shaw, of Palapye, Bechuanaland Protectorate. For services in connection with war funds, particularly the Red Cross Fund for Prisoners of War.
- Marion Slade, lately Confidential Secretary and Typist to the Prime Minister, Southern Rhodesia.
- Ida Christina Smith, President, Angaston Red Cross, State of South Australia.
- Edward Charles Somner. For voluntary services to the Empire Societies War Hospitality Committee in Edinburgh.
- Edward Hamilton Stephens, Senior House Master, Hutchins School, State of Tasmania.
- George Harry Stone, Thrift and Salvage Officer, Southern Rhodesia.
- Ruth Orpen Taylor, a Municipal and City Councillor of Bulawayo, Southern Rhodesia.
- Florence Alice Eliza Usher. For services in connection with the collection of war funds in the Northern District, Swaziland.
- Johanna Visser, of Maseru, Basutoland. For services in connection with the collection of war funds.
- George Victor Wallace, LDS, RCS, Chairman of the Bulawayo branch, Red Cross Society, Southern Rhodesia.
- Irene Hilda Warren. For services to the Port Pirie branch, Red Cross Society, State of South Australia.
- Ethel Wells, Matron of the Sanatorium, St John's, Newfoundland.
- Joshua Winsor, Master of the MV Winnifred Lee, of Newfoundland. For services to Northern Labrador.
- Bernice Barlow (wife of Mr. N. Barlow, Messrs. Binny & Co. Ltd.), Madras.
- Annie Blanch, Lady Clayton (wife of Sir Hugh Clayton, CIE, ICS (retired)), Women's Voluntary Service, Bombay.
- Winifred Nellie Cocks, Principal, Queen Mary College, Lahore, Punjab.
- Ava Dhar (wife of Mr. S. M. Dhar, CIE, ICS, Development Commissioner), Bihar.
- Edith Maude Hotchkiss, Civilian Assistant Censor, Censor Station, Peshawar.
- Kathleen Mary Jackson, lately Physiotherapist, 130 Indian Base General Hospital, Lucknow.
- Elsie Vivienne King (wife of Mr. C. King, CIE, ICS, Commissioner, Rawalpindi Division), Chairwoman, WVS, and Lady District Officer, No. 12 District St. John's Ambulance Association, Rawalpindi, Punjab.
- Elizabeth Bridgewater Kitcat, Regional Red Cross Commissioner, Burma Region, South-East Asia Command.
- Elizabeth Morrison, Honorary Secretary, Women's Voluntary Services, Madras City Branch, Madras.
- Florence Martha Sheppard (wife of Lieutenant-Colonel H. J. Sheppard, OBE, DCM, the Rajputana Rifles Regimental Centre).
- Olive Florence, Lady Wadsworth, (wife of the Honourable Mr. Justice S. Wadsworth, ICS, Judge, High Court of Judicature), Madras.
- Khan Bahadur Abdul Hamid, DPH, Assistant Director of Public Health, United Provinces.
- Abdul Manan Malik, Executive Engineer, Public Works Department, Buildings & Roads Branch, Punjab.
- Khan Bahadur Munshi Abdul Qaiyum Khan, Post-war Reconstruction Officer, Ajmer-Merwara, and lately Additional Assistant Commissioner, Ajmer-Merwara.
- Abdul Rehman Mohamud Yusuf, Landlord and Businessman, Novah, Panvel Taluka, Kolaba District, Bombay.
- Khan Bahadur Ahmed Jan, Munshi, Peshawar Cantonment.
- Syed Ahmed Alley, Deputy Controller, Fauji Dilkhush Sabha.
- Arthur Whitcombe Amor, Inspector of Stores, India Store Department, Office of the High Commissioner for India in London.
- Harry Arshacony, Service Manager, General Motors (India) Ltd.
- Muhammad Ayub, Indian Civil Service, Deputy Secretary to the Government of India in the Department of Industries & Supplies.
- Rai Bahadur Partap Chandra Bahl, Joint Director, Civil Engineering, Railway Board, New Delhi.
- Sachindra Nath Banerjee, Registrar-in-Insolvency, Original Side, High Court, Calcutta, Bengal.
- Birendra Nath Banerji, Imperial Customs Service, Officiating Deputy Secretary to the Government of India in the Commerce Department.
- Pratip Chandra Basu, Works Manager, Alambagh Workshops, East Indian Railway, Lucknow.
- Louis Henry George Bessent, Assistant Master, Currency Note Press, India.
- Nisiih Bhattacharya, AMIE, Assistant Director of Training, Director-General of Resettlement & Employment, Department of Works, Mines & Power.
- Rai Bahadur Surjya Kumar Bhuyan, Professor, Cotton College, Gauhati, Assam.
- Cyril Steven Booth, Shillong, Assam.
- Sukumar Bose, Sub-divisional Leader, National War Front, Samastipur, Bihar.
- Khan Bahadur Syed Bunyad Hussain, Chief Minister, Jaora State.
- John Henry Butter, Indian Civil Service, Assistant to Political Agent, Manipur State.
- Rangachari Padmanabha Chari, LM&S, LRCP, FRCS(Ed), Civil Surgeon, Jubbulpore, Central Provinces and Berar.
- Panditappa Rayappa Chikodi, Landlord, Belgaum, Bombay.
- Mohammed Jalal-Un-Din Chughtai, Secretary to the General Manager, East Indian Railway, Calcutta.
- William Robert Clarke Assistant Collector of Customs, Bombay.
- Ralph Anthony Edward Cooper, Superintendent, Telegraph Workshops, Jubbulpore.
- Henry Walter Cox, Manager, New Terai Association, Panighatta, Darjeeling, Bengal.
- Alfred Edward Davis, Civilian Deputy Assistant Adjutant General, Adjutant-General's Branch, GHQ, India.
- Kamini Kumar De, Deputy Director of Agriculture, Upper Assam Valley, Jorhat, Assam.
- Stephan Doran, Chief Officer, Calcutta Fire Brigade, Bengal.
- Kenneth Ray Eates, Indian Police, Superintendent of Police, Sind Criminal Investigation Department, Karachi, Sind.
- George Bertram Charles Evennette, Deputy Registrar, High Court of Judicature at Lahore, Punjab.
- John Foster, Manager, Hallett Institute, Dehra Dun, United Provinces.
- Joseph Franco, Principal, Teachers' College, Saidapet, Madras.
- Harold Frank Gebbett, Manager, Messrs. Pinchin, Johnson & Co. Ltd., Bombay.
- Major (Local Lieutenant-Colonel) Roderic Arthur Graham, Commandant, Indian State Forces Training School, Assistant Military Adviser, Central India States Forces.
- Frank Stanley Gregory, Superintendent, Budla Beta Tea Co., Kanjikoah Tea Estate, Panitola P.O., Assam.
- Mulchand Tulsidar Gulrajani, Commandant, 1st Unit of Bihar Civil Pioneer Force, Bihar.
- Nirmal Kumar Gupta, Professor of History, Jagannath Intermediate College, Dacca, Bengal.
- Har Nath Singh, Major in the Gwalior State Forces, Officer Commanding, Gwalior Lancers Reconnaissance Regimental Training Centre.
- Cecil William Harvey, General Manager, Cement Works, Japla, Palamau District, Bihar.
- Charles George Bancroft Hinchey, Deputy Regional Controller of Railway Priorities, Calcutta.
- Khan Bahadur Ibrahim Khalil Khan, Additional Settlement Officer, Hazara, North-West Frontier Province.
- James Jebb, Resident Engineer, Great Indian Peninsula Railway, Saugor.
- Major Kundan Lal Jetley, Indian Medical Service (retired M.O.I./C.), the Sikh Regimental Centre.
- Rai Bahadur Jiwan Lal, MD, Professor (retired), King Edward Medical College, Lahore, Punjab.
- Thomas Jacques Johnston, Civilian General Staff Officer (and Grade), General Staff Branch, General Headquarters, India.
- Bernard Kaiser, Controller No. 4 C.M.U., Dum Dum.
- Ram Rao Kakde, Major in the Gwalior State Forces, Officer Commanding, Gwalior Pony Company.
- Narayanrav Marutirav Kamte, Indian Police, District Superintendent of Police, Bombay.
- Ram Lal Kaura, MRCVS, Central Veterinary Service, Deputy Director of Veterinary Services, Orissa.
- Nalin Behari Ker, Senior Educational Officer, Office of the High Commissioner for India in London.
- Major Gustav Albert Henry Korts, Deputy National Savings Commissioner, National Savings Bureau, Government of India.
- George Thomas Labey, Branch Pilot, Bengal Pilot Service (retired).
- Arthur Samuel Lall, Indian Civil Service, Deputy Secretary (Planning), Finance Department, Government of India.
- Ewen McDonald Loan, Manager, Technical Training (Civil) Centre, Peshawar, North-West Frontier Province.
- Gerald Lawrence Lobo, Deputy Director of Public Instruction, Madras.
- James Shirley Lowick, Acting Executive Officer, Office of the High Commissioner for India in London.
- William Patrick Lynch, Officer Supervisor, Naval Headquarters.
- Sidney Clarence Aubrey Lyon, Officiating Deputy Commissioner of Police, Bombay City Police, Bombay.
- Haribandhu Mahanti, PhD, Under Secretary to the Government of Orissa, Planning & Reconstruction Department, Orissa.
- Douglas Albert Martin, Accountant of the London Office of the Reserve Bank of India, London.
- Horatio Keith Matthews, Indian Civil Service, lately Deputy Director of War Publicity, Madras.
- John Wintle Maye, Works Manager, Loco Workshops, Bombay, Baroda and Central India Railway, Ajmer.
- Mayongnokcha Ao, Headmaster, Government ME School, Mokokchung, Naga Hills, Assam.
- Edward Follet McInerny, Indian Civil Service, District Magistrate, Chittagong, Bengal.
- Albert Reginald Menezes, Deputy Secretary, Cotton Movements Panel of the Textile Control Board, Government of India.
- Rao Bahadur Mangat Narayana Menon, Chief Labour Recruiting Officer, Cochin State.
- Frederick Mills, Civilian Deputy Assistant Director of Medical Services, Central Provision Office (Eastern Group).
- Masud-Ul-Aziz Minhas, Assistant Deputy Director-General, Posts & Telegraphs, New Delhi.
- Mohammad Hussain, Divisional Engineer, Telephones, Delhi Telephone Division, New Delhi.
- John Moir, Deputy Red Cross Commissioner, Secunderabad, Deccan.
- William Nedou, Partner, M. Nedou & Sons, Hotel Proprietors, Srinagar, Kashmir.
- Sabba Neelakantam, Under-Secretary to the Government of India in the Department of Works, Mines & Power.
- Hayat Singh Negi, Indian Audit and Accounts Service, Deputy Financial Adviser (Supply Finance), Government of India.
- Major Malik Nur Muhammad Khan, Officer Commanding, Mounted Wing, Sind Police Rifles, Hyderabad, Sind.
- George Frederick Omond, lately Chief Executive Officer, Standing River Conservancy Board (Military).
- Rao Bahadur Thakur Onkar Singh, Istimrardar of Bagsuri and Assistant Commissioner, Ajmer-Merwara.
- John Frederick Paisley, Indian Service of Engineers, Executive Engineer, Presidency Division, Bombay.
- Ronald Donald Penhearow, Senior Assistant Secretary to Government, Lahore, Punjab.
- Inder Mohan Puri, PhD, Assistant Director, Malaria Institute of India.
- Frederick George Quarry, Tea Planter, Dehra Dun, United Provinces.
- Khan Bahadur Rahman Baksh Qadri, Deputy Director of Supply, Lucknow, United Provinces.
- Mannargudi Sivjaram Ramayyar, Indian Audit & Accounts Service, Assistant Financial Adviser, Military Finance.
- Laksminarayanapuram Anantakrishnan Ramdas, Agricultural Meteorologist, New Delhi.
- Sri Rao Bahadur Thozur Madabusi Rangachari, Managing Director and Senior Partner, Messrs. Chari & Chari Ltd., Electrical Engineers, and lately Honorary Depot Superintendent, ARP, Madras.
- Major Charles Winton Browne Rankin, Assistant Private Secretary to His Excellency the Viceroy.
- Gerald Reeves-Brown, Secretary, District Grand Lodge of the Punjab, Freemasons' Hall, Lahore, Punjab.
- Eric Stanley Robey, Executive Engineer, Public Works Department, Buildings & Roads Branch, United Provinces.
- George Albert Rushton, Inspector of Stores, India Store Department, Office of the High Commissioner for India in London.
- James Saddler, Indian Civil Service, lately Deputy Secretary, Civil Supplies Department, Government of Bengal.
- Gangaram Malappa Sankpal, Statistician, Finance Department (Supply), Secretariat, Bombay.
- Andrew Bennet Scott, Indian Civil Service, District Magistrate, Tippera, Bengal.
- Robert Clinton Scott, Officer Supervisor, Medical Directorate, General Headquarters, India.
- Bhupendra Nath Sen, District Inspector of Schools, Bengal.
- Karunaketan Sen, Indian Civil Service, Deputy Director of Supply, Civil Supplies Department, Government of Bengal.
- Kula Prasad Sen, Assistant National Savings Commissioner, National Savings Bureau, Government of India.
- Rai Bahadur Kanan Bihari Sen Roy, Deputy Inspector-General of Civil Hospitals, United Provinces.
- Finlay Shaw, Workshop Engineer, The Madras Electric Tramway Co. Ltd., and lately Honorary Rescue Officer, ARP, Madras.
- Sadanand Waman Shiveshwarkar, Indian Civil Service, Under-Secretary to the Government of India in the Department of Industries and Supplies.
- Trebhuban Prasad Singh, Indian Civil Service, Deputy Secretary, Education, Development & Employment Department, Bihar.
- Norman Slade, Indian Ordnance Service, Assistant Inspector of Scientific Stores, Master-General of Ordnance Branch, General Headquarters, India.
- Francis Arthur Smith, Works Manager, Bengal Assam Railway, Saidpur.
- George William Reginald Smith, Director of Customs and Port Officer, Bahrain State.
- Major Edward Henry Staples, Honorary Secretary of the Bangalore Joint War Committee (Red Cross & St John's Ambulance), Bangalore.
- Donald James Stephens, British Consular Agent, Lingah.
- William Stewart Stewart, Superintendent, Jeypore Tea Estate, Jeypore, Lakhimpur, Assam.
- Major Alasdair Ramsay Tainsh, 16th Punjab Regiment (Royal Indian Army Service Corps), Indian Army.
- Rai Bahadur Babu Tika Ram, Deputy Superintendent of Police (Intelligence), Lucknow, United Provinces.
- M. R. Ry. Vairicherla Durga Prasadha Veerabadra Deo Bahadur Garu, Zatnindar of Kurupam, Vizagapatam District, Madras.
- Jamshedji Rustomji Vekharia, Cotton Ginning and Pressing Factory Owner, Broach, Bombay.
- Bangalore Moorthy Vencoba Rao, Captain in Bhopal State Forces, Assistant Private Secretary to His Highness the Nawab of Bhopal.
- Alfred Richardson Ventriss, Deputy Controller, Clothing, Clothing Factory, Shahjahanpur.
- Rai Bahadur Diwan Chand Verma, Assistant Surveyor-General (Organisation), Survey of India.
- Albert White, Officer Supervisor, Welfare-General's Branch, General Headquarters, India.
- Roy Arthur Whomsley, Service Manager, Ford Motor Co. (India) Ltd.
- Harold Edgar Williams, Workshop Instructor, East Indian Railway, Jamalpur.
- Captain John Wilson, Indian Political Service (temporary), Assistant Political Agent, North Waziristan, North-West Frontier Province.
- Captain Syed Muhammad Zamin Ali, Head of the Department of Urdu, Allahabad University, United Provinces.
- Archibald Ferguson, Assistant Mechanical Engineer, Burma Railways.
- Sardar Sahib Rajinder Singh Grewal, Civil Surgeon, Burma.
- Robert Mowbray Anderson. For public services in St. Vincent.
- Haralambos Christodoulou Artemis, Assistant Secretary, Cyprus.
- Ramaswamy Gopal Ayer, Extra Assistant Controller of Labour, Malaya.
- Margaret Annie Allport Bentley. For public services in Fiji.
- Richard Blackie, DCM, Road Surveyor, Public Works Department, Uganda.
- Ada Madeline Bode. For public services in Fiji.
- John James Cameron, lately Area Medical Transport Officer, Civilian Medical Defence Scheme, Hong Kong. For services during hostilities and internment.
- Joseph Pius Chrysostom, Department of Publicity & Information, Singapore. For services during enemy occupation.
- Shut Ting Chu, Overseer King's Park Orphanage, Hong Kong. For services during the enemy occupation.
- Kenneth Howard Clarke, Colonial Administrative Service, Administrative Officer, Zanzibar.
- Andrew William Clow, BEM, Colonial Police Service, Assistant Superintendent of Police, Palestine.
- Arthur Oakley Coltman, lately Officer-in-Charge, Rescue Service, Kuala Lumpur, Malaya. For services during hostilities.
- Doris Connell. For public services in the Leeward Islands.
- Ernest Frederick Cripps. For public services in Mauritius.
- Joseph David Dadzie. For public services in the Gold Coast.
- Adolph Demajo, Public Works Engineer, Malta.
- Lionel William Donough, Malayan Civil Service. For services during enemy occupation.
- John Oswald Drinkald, Sanitary Superintendent, Grade I, Gold Coast.
- Gordon MacDonald Duff. For public services in Tanganyika Territory.
- Bertha Dyson. For public services in Ceylon.
- Patrick Thomas English, Clerk and Customs Officer, Gilbert and Ellice Islands.
- Ernest Ferando, Department of Information & Publicity, Malaya. For services during enemy occupation.
- William Finch, Permanent Way Inspector, Nigerian Railway.
- Heather Victoria Fisher, Colonial Nursing Service, Nursing Sister, Malaya. For services during hostilities.
- Ivan Sidney Fisher. For services in Sungei Buloh Leper Settlement, Malaya.
- Dorothy Phyllis Geen, Colonial Nursing Service, Matron, Hong Kong Government Medical Department. For services during internment.
- Richard Howey Greensitt Greener, Mechanical Engineer, Grade II, Electricity Branch, Public Works Department, Nigeria.
- Ethel A. Henderson, Colonial Nursing Service, Nursing Sister, Sarawak. For services during and subsequent to the Japanese occupation.
- Doris Higgs. For public services in Nigeria.
- Jonathan David Joseph, Assistant Commissioner Special Volunteer Constabulary, Singapore Police. For service during hostilities.
- The Reverend Ivo Keown-Boyd. For public services in St. Vincent, Windward Islands.
- John George Maydon King, Colonial Agricultural Service, Agricultural Officer, Tanganyika Territory.
- George Wellington Rex L'Ange. For public services in Northern Rhodesia.
- Agnes Chue Chung Luen, Matron, Kwong Wah Hospital, Kowloon, Hong Kong. For services during the enemy occupation.
- Thomas Carew Luke, Assistant Colonial Secretary, Sierra Leone.
- John McWilliams, Maintenance Engineer, Public Works Department, Palestine.
- Kathleen May Megget. For public services in Ceylon.
- Ethel Maud Melhado. For public services in British Honduras.
- Walter Molegode, Agricultural Officer, Ceylon.
- Frederick Francis Julius Anthony Murat. For public services in Cyprus.
- Robert Shaphee Rassool, Legal Adviser, Seychelles.
- Captain Robert C. Sheppard, Master of MV Trepassey, Falkland Islands.
- Amratral Ujamsee Sheth, MB, BS. For public services in Kenya.
- Man Singh, Clerk in Customs Department, Nyasaland.
- Dennis Noel Smalley, Senior Agricultural Assistant, Nyasaland.
- Mercedes Solomon. For public services in the Bahamas.
- Arthur Lorraine Stephens, Agricultural Officer, Uganda.
- Alice Stewart, Nursing Sister, Sierra Leone.
- Dato Hussein Bin Mohamed Taib, Malayan Civil Service. For services prior to and during the Japanese occupation.
- Percy William Vaughan, Tyre Controller, Kenya.
- Margaret Scott Watson, Lady Almoner, Hong Kong Government Medical Department. For services during internment.
- Oscar Stanley Wight. For public services in British Guiana.
- Herbert Hadley Williams. For public services in Barbados.
- Molly Gwendoline Wright. For public services in the Leeward Islands.
- Bin Mohamed Sheikh Dah'lan, late Liwali of Vanga, Kenya. For distinguished services to Government.
- Ali Hayyari, Captain, Arab Legion, Trans-Jordan.
- Irany, Headmaster of Boys' Reformatory School, Palestine.
- Isawi, Arab District Officer, Palestine.
- Lazaro Kamugungumu, Principal Minister of Ankole, Uganda.
- Herimingldo Karubanga, late Kimbugwe (Country Chief) of Buruli, Uganda.
- L. Rutenberg, Honorary Government Agent of Lend/Lease Supplies, Palestine. For distinguished services to Government.
- Hamdan Sbeih, Lieutenant, Arab Legion, Trans-Jordan.
- Shimshi, Jewish District Officer, Palestine.
- Datu Tunku Taha, Senior Native Officer, Sarawak. For services during and after the Japanese occupation.
- B. Willie Dado, British North Borneo. For services prior to and during the Japanese occupation.
- Mohomed bin Haji Hassan Yassin, Native Chief, Sipitang, British North Borneo. For services during the Japanese occupation.

=== Order of the Companions of Honour (CH) ===
- George Gibson, LLD, Vice-Chairman, National Savings Committee. A past Chairman of the Trades Union Congress.

=== Imperial Service Order (ISO) ===
Dominion Civil Services

- William Stephen Henry Andrew, JP, Under-Secretary for Public Works, State of Western Australia.
- William Lindsay, Architect-in-Chief, State of South Australia.
- Rudolph Joseph O'Keefe, Superintending Forestry Officer, Department of Natural Resources, Newfoundland.
- Eric Trestrail Palmer, lately Assistant Chief Native Commissioner, Southern Rhodesia.
- Alexander James Reid, JP, Under-Treasurer and Commissioner of Stamps, State of Western Australia.
- Frederick William Steele, Under-Treasurer, State of Tasmania.
- Sidney Charles Stenning, Secretary, Central Board of Health Department, State of South Australia.
- Albert Harold Telfer, JP, Under-secretary for Mines, and lately Under-secretary for Civil Defence, State of Western Australia.
- Byron John Thompson, Public Service Commissioner, State of Tasmania.

Indian Civil Services

- Herbert John Bennett, Principal Executive Officer, Office of the High Commissioner for India in London.
- Ernest Victor Casey, Superintendent, Central Jail and Presidency Jail for Women, Vellore, North Arcot District, Madras.
- Khan Bahadur Muhammad Latif Qureshi, Superintendent, Office of the Military Secretary to His Excellency the Viceroy.

Burma Civil Service

- Joseph George Williams, Chief Reporter and Personal Assistant to the President of the Burma Legislative Council.

Colonial Service

- Nelson Betancourt, Assistant Inspector of Mines, Trinidad.
- Geoffrey Douglas Aylett Branfill, Colonial Police Service, Superintendent of Police, Nyasaland.
- Felix Ernest Danner, Postmaster, Gambia.
- David Davies, ARSanL, lately Chief Clerk, Colonial Secretary's Office, Hong Kong, at present on temporary duty in the Colonial Office.
- Victor Stanley De Kretser, Class II Officer, Ceylon Civil Service.
- Framurz Naoroji Golvala, Chief Clerk, His Majesty's High Court, Uganda.
- Ronald Leigh Hett, Provincial Labour Officer, Uganda.
- Ibrahim Mohomed Bun Yadeem Jobe, Supervisor of Customs, Gambia.
- Robert Mensah Johnson, Chief Audit Clerk, Gold Coast.
- Vahram Levonian, Superintendent of Waterworks, Cyprus.
- James MacMunn, Senior Instructor, Education Department, Kenya.
- Francisco Sule Martins, Assistant Superintendent of Press, Nigeria.
- Louis Mendonca, Chief Clerk, Secretariat, Uganda.
- James Henry Pirie, Stores Superintendent, Nigerian Railway.
- Ernest Pizzarello, Assistant Registrar and Deputy Clerk of Arraigns, Supreme Court, Gibraltar.
- Leonard William Raymond, Secretariat, Zanzibar.

=== Kaiser-i-Hind Gold Medal ===
- Her Highness Rani Kusum Kumuri, of Mandi.
- Margery Katherine Davis, MBE, Warden, Manila Seva Gram, Erandavna, Poona District, Bombay.
- Mary, Lady Lloyd (wife of Sir Alan Lloyd, CSI, CIE), Honorary Secretary, SPCA, Delhi.
- Eleanor Rivett, lately Principal, United Missionary High School, Bhowanipur, Calcutta, Bengal.
- Arthur Foot, Headmaster, The Doon School, Dehra Dun.
- Major-General Sir George Gray Jolly, KCIE, Chief Commissioner, Indian Red Cross & St. John War Organisation.
- The Most Reverend Thomas d'Esterre Roberts, DD, RC, Archbishop of Bombay and Bishop Delegate to His Majesty's Forces, South-East Asia.

=== British Empire Medal (BEM) ===
Military Division

Royal Navy

- Wren Elizabeth Jane Elma Aitkenhead, WRNS.46665.
- Temporary Stoker Petty Officer Albert Edward Allen, C/KX.91922.
- Yeoman of Signals Richard Horatio Allport, P/SSX.14936.
- Chief Petty Officer Writer Frederick Roy George Antell, C/MX.50629.
- Petty Officer Telegraphist John Thomas Archer, C/SSX.32437.
- Engine Room Artificer 2nd Class Norman Atkinson, D/MX.55479.
- Leading Sick Berth Attendant (D) Horace Osborn Baker, P/MX.80378.
- Sergeant (Acting Temporary Quartermaster Sergeant) John Baker, Royal Marines, PO/X.1632.
- Chief Petty Officer Wren Elizabeth Dykes Davidson Menzies Banks, WRNS.5928.
- Colour Sergeant Seymour Albert Victor Barnett, Royal Marines, PO/X.22665.
- Chief Petty Officer Cook (S) James Percival Beach, P/MX.46587.
- Master-at-Arms Joseph Love Beattie, P/MX.54922.
- Leading Wren Thelma Beere, WRNS.34835.
- Wren Irene Mary Bellamy, WRNS.86486.
- Chief Petty Officer Writer Donald Price Forbes Bermingham, D/MX.48817.
- Petty Officer Writer Percy Bid Well, P/MX.56491.
- Electrical Artificer 4th Class John Henry Binder, C/MX.118410.
- Chief Stoker Cyril James Birch, P/KX.79487.
- Master-at-Arms (Temporary) George Edward Boniface, C/MX.61548.
- Chief Petty Officer Beverly Arthur James Britnell, D/J.108209.
- Temporary Colour Sergeant Arthur James Brown, Royal Marines, EX.3721.
- Stores Petty Officer William Elmore Brown, D/KX.64237.
- Petty Officer William John Brown, C/J.108886.
- Leading Writer Peter McEachran Buchanan, C/MX.621938.
- Chief Petty Officer Wren Betty Mary Buck, WRNS.4512.
- Quartermaster Sergeant (Temporary) Edward Charles Buckland, Royal Marines, CH/X.100586.
- Able Seaman Robert Walter Callen, P/JX.388068.
- Petty Officer Wren Jessie Bernie Carl, WRNS.19698.
- Temporary Chief Yeoman of Signals Cecil Norman Carter, P/JX.141291.
- Petty Officer Steward Leo Charles Chadwick, L/LX.27575.
- Electrical Mechanic 4th Class Arthur Henry Cheesman, C/MX.96028.
- Chief Petty Officer Steward Francesco Chicutti, MVO, E/LX.12752.
- Chief Petty Officer Wren Marjory Waite Clarke, WRNS.336.
- Chief Petty Officer Wren Beatrice Evaline Esson Coe, WRNS.2102.
- Petty Officer Alfred Collings, D/J.222726.
- Engine Room Artificer 3rd Class Wilfred George Cookson, C/MX.92115.
- Petty Officer Engineman Albert Edwin Cooper, LT/KX.131546.
- Seaman Herbert Joseph Craven, L/JX.407164.
- Petty Officer William Dominick Cremen, P/JX.160560.
- Chief Stoker John Cubbage, C/K.2O153.
- Chief Stoker John Barnett Dadd, C/KX.78130.
- Chief Petty Officer Geoffrey Dalton, P/JX.129774.
- Sick Berth Chief Petty Officer John Alfred David, C/MX.46294.
- Electrical Artificer 3rd Class Alexander Davidson, P/CDX.2725.
- Chief Petty Officer Telegraphist Henry James Davis, D/JX.138347.
- Chief Electrical Artificer William Frederick Dowsett, P/MX.47727.
- Able Seaman Reginald Frank Drewell, C/JX.259304.
- Engineroom Artificer 4th Class Fred Eastwood, C/MX.97861.
- Leading Wireman George Ellis, C/MX.76473.
- Company Sergeant Major Cecil Frederick Evans, Royal Marines, Ply.22650.
- Chief Mechanician Sheik Yusuf Fazluddin, R.I.N.962.
- Chief Petty Officer Wren Lilian Maude Ferguson, WRNS.17320.
- Company Sergeant Major (Acting Regimental Sergeant Major) Edward James Fishlock, Royal Marines, PO/22477.
- Chief Petty Officer Writer Philip Fixter, D/MX.47698.
- Petty Officer Telegraphist William Ernest Fletcher, D/JX.135898.
- Sick Berth Chief Petty Officer Patrick Forrest, D/MX.47387.
- Petty Officer Wren June Audrey Foster, WRNS.12033.
- Petty Officer Cook (S) Leonard James Francis, P/MX.46313.
- Stores Petty Officer Reginald Frankland, P/MX.46390.
- Chief Petty Officer Cook (S) James Thomas Freeman, C/MX.52475.
- Chief Petty Officer Wren Annie Beatrice Louise Garratt, WRNS.19042.
- Chief Engineroom Artificer Harry Michael George, P/M.15003.
- Chief Engineroom Artificer Robert Joseph Goodman, D/MX.56797.
- Petty Officer Writer Robert Alfred Redvers Gould Stone, D/MX.510849.
- Chief Petty Officer Air Fitter (A) Arthur Edward Green, DSM, FAA/FX.7595O.
- Chief Petty Officer Writer Henry Herbert Greenslade, P/MX.46840.
- Chief Petty Officer Writer (Temporary) James Greenwood, P/MX.51086.
- Chief Petty Officer David Lloyd George Groome, P/JX.128432.
- Chief Petty Officer Ralph Gulvin, P/J.33888.
- Acting Master-at-Arms George Gunn, P/MX.703439.
- Chief Petty Officer Writer John Colin Hakes, D/MX.55433.
- Chief Petty Officer Wren Elsie Irene Josephine Hall, WRNS.519.
- Temporary Sergeant George Hall, Royal Marines, PLY/X.120620.
- Chief Petty Officer Wren Ethel Mary Hammond, WRNS.24255.
- Chief Stoker John Hanby, C/K.65253.
- Able Seaman Eric Hayton, P/JX.430363.
- Petty Officer Wren Joan Heeley, WRNS.19707.
- Petty Officer Wren Marion Ivy Herbert, WRNS.33732.
- Chief Petty Officer Writer Morris John Herring, P/MX.56430.
- Acting Regulating Petty Officer Raymond William Herrington, P/MX.714207.
- Petty Officer Telegraphist Leo Hewitt, D/J.102928.
- Wren Joan Abbot Higgins, WRNS.54947.
- Acting Leading Seaman (Temporary) John Rupert Higgins, P/JX.275582.
- Petty Officer Herbert Frederick Hilder, C/J.101688.
- Chief Petty Officer Wren Alice Amy Clara Hiles, WRNS.11631.
- Chief Engineroom Artificer Edward Cowling Hill, D/MX.57587.
- Stoker 1st Class Ronald Leslie Hills, C/KX.156974.
- Petty Officer Wren Mary Cecilia Hilson, WRNS.45502.
- Leading Telegraphist Harold Reginald Hitch, C/JX.163823.
- Master-at-Arms Ernest Gordon Holden, D/MX.39854.
- Stores Chief Petty Officer Roy Frederick Hooper, C/MX.48854.
- Chief Petty Officer Writer (Temporary) Arthur James House, P/MX.52806.
- Petty Officer Wren Marjorie Elizabeth Hyslop, WRNS.4665.
- Leading Writer (Temporary) Walter Jenkins, D/MX.81698.
- Able Seaman Donald Frank Johnson, D/JX.347661.
- Chief Petty Officer Wren Margaret Eiluned Jones, WRNS.53570.
- Chief Petty Officer Iqbal Khan, R.I.N.2410.
- Petty Officer (Acting Aircraft Boatswains Mate) David John Kimber, D/JX.151495.
- Chief Petty Officer Llewellyn George Kington, C/MX.54103.
- Chief Shipwright 2nd Class George Cephas Knight, C/342902.
- Acting Yeoman of Signals (Temporary) Robert Charles Larkins, C/JX.252595.
- Chief Petty Officer Charles William Ernest Lawrence, C/J.93459.
- Riggers Mate John MacKay Lawson, R/JX.346332.
- Seaman Johh Robert Leadbetter, LT/JX.400255.
- Leading Telegraphist Walter George Lewry, C/MX.269013.
- Chief Petty Officer Wren Elsie May Loynes, WRNS. 649.
- Chief Petty Officer Percy Gordon Lowe, C/JX.148518.
- Sick Berth Chief Petty Officer Sydney Charles Luckman, C/M.38112.
- Petty Officer Norman Charles Lukins, D/J.11286.
- Sick Berth Chief Petty Officer Daniel Lynch, C/351710.
- Chief Petty Officer Wren Barbara Mcdonald, WRNS.16649.
- Engineroom Artificer 3rd Class Ronald George Mclachlan, D/MX.75343.
- Petty Officer Wren Martha McMeechan, WRNS.12658.
- Chief Petty Officer Writer Christopher Robert Maguire, C/MX.52096.
- Petty Officer Charles Richard Manderson, P/JX.181641.
- Petty Officer Writer George Stephen Mann, D/MX.511558.
- Air Artificer 3rd Class George Watters Martin, FAA/FX.75975.
- Able Seaman Harry Martin, P/JX.297842.
- Petty Officer Telegraphist Cecil Edward Masters, C/J.109717.
- Chief Petty Officer Albert Stephen Clyde Miller, P/J.108231.
- Chief Petty Officer Robert Henry Mockler, P/J.54510.
- Petty Officer Writer (Temporary) John Moffatt, C/MX.82169.
- Petty Officer Albert Robert Moore, LT/X.20636A.
- Acting Regulating Petty Officer (Temporary) John Mottram, D/JX.366028.
- Chief Petty Officer Henry Richard Mucklow, P/J.30057.
- Chief Petty Officer Wren Dorothy May Murphy, WRNS.1435.
- Leading Stoker James Joseph Murphy, P/K.67011.
- Leading Wireman John Richard Nicholls, C/MX.65433.
- Chief Petty Officer Percy Douglas Nicholls, D/J.9616.
- Acting Master-at-Arms (Temporary) Sidney Ernest Nicholls, D/MX.728313.
- Petty Officer Charles Edward Nield, P/J.3735.
- Chief Mechanician Simeon George Nunn, C/K.12875.
- Sick Berth Chief Petty Officer John Sims O'Donnell, D/MX.48124.
- Chief Petty Officer Wren Kathleen Philomena O'Kane. WRNS.15688.
- Leading Writer (Temporary) John Joseph Ormsby, D/MX.674064.
- Stores Chief Petty Officer William Charles John Osmond, D/MX.57062.
- Chief Petty Officer Thomas Otway, C/J.95755.
- Acting Chief Air Artificer David Norman Owen, FAA/FX.75178.
- Regimental Quartermaster Sergeant Joseph Arthur Oxley, Royal Marines, PO/X.216.
- Chief Stoker Arthur Harry Pargetter, C/K.66724.
- Chief Petty Officer William Henry Passant, DSM, D/JX.125099.
- Able Seaman Francis John Esaw Paul, D/JX.365633.
- Chief Stoker William Payne, C/K.11327.
- Petty Officer Nelson Frederick Stuart Pike, D/JX.126994.
- Leading Telegraphist Thomas Arthur Preston, D/J.52090.
- Chief Yeoman of Signals Thomas Roland Price, P/J.3751.
- Leading Seaman Benjamin Priest, C/JX.353985.
- Chief Engineroom Artificer Harry Rears, C/M.4513.
- Colour Sergeant Ernest John Redmore, Royal Marines, PLY/21191.
- Temporary Stores Chief Petty Officer Reginald Thomas Reed, D/MX.57068.
- Bandmaster 1st Class Richard Henry Reynolds, Royal Marines, RMB/X.122.
- Corporal (Temporary) (Acting Temporary Sergeant) Maurice Edwin Richardson, Royal Marines, RME.11790.
- Chief Motor Mechanic 4th Class Leslie Roberts, P/M.71989.
- Chief Petty Officer John Robertson, P/JX.129296.
- Temporary Colour Sergeant (Acting Quartermaster Sergeant) Charles Henry Rookes, Royal Marines, PLY/18053.
- Leading Wren Jean Betty Rudd, WRNS.42409.
- Chief Petty Officer Telegraphist Harold Thomas Saban, C/J.15779.
- Chief Stoker (Temporary) Clifford Albert Seal, D/KX.77225.
- Petty Officer Alan Jeffrey Searle, LT/JX.282305.
- Temporary Sergeant (Acting Temporary Colour Sergeant) Douglas Malcolm Shackle, Royal Marines, PLY/X.120212.
- Chief Petty Officer Wren Elizabeth Shannon, WRNS.22105.
- Petty Officer Radio Mechanic Walter Thomas William Sheppard, P/MX.574817.
- Acting Leading Telegraphist (Temporary) Stanley Frank Sherwood, C/X.343682.
- Master-At-Arms Irwin Simpson, C/M.40159.
- Petty Officer Wireman Thomas Percival Sinclair, C/MX.5O7848.
- Ordnance Artificer 3rd Class Lawrence Jack Skett, P/MX.59875.
- Petty Officer Wren Jean Poppy Marion Skidmore, WRNS.12722.
- Chief Petty Officer Wren Mabel Minto Smith, WRNS.3591.
- Chief Rigger Sydney James Smith, R/JX.170649.
- Engineroom Artificer 3rd Class William Smith, C/MX.62563.
- Leading Wren Elizabeth Austin Sparks, WRNS.46927.
- Stores Petty Officer Clifford Stanley Stapleton, D/MX.106227.
- Engineroom Artificer 3rd Class John Thomas Chilean Stephens, C/MX.76003.
- Officers Chief Cook Sydney John Veal Stephens, C/L.14571.
- Chief Petty Officer Albert Edward Stones, P/192314.
- Chief Engineroom Artificer Gilbert Thomas Daniel Stowar, P.7272492.
- Leading Coder Russell Henry Strike, P/JX.225481.
- Leading Wren Patience Diana Stuart, WRNS.30160.
- Chief Petty Officer Wren Audrey Maude Stutter, WRNS.34880.
- Petty Officer (Radar) (Temporary) Joseph Swain, P/JX.223085.
- Seaman Clifford Tarry, LT/JX.279489.
- Yeoman of Signals Charles Frederick Taylor, C/J.33598.
- Sergeant (Temporary) Ernest Taylor, Royal Marines, PLY/X.120473.
- Chief Petty Officer Stanley Taylor, D/J.113479.
- Petty Officer Wren Joan Thomas, WRNS.33005.
- Sick Berth Chief Petty Officer (Temporary) Leonard Raymond Thomas, D/MX.46908.
- Acting Chief Petty Officer Steward Sellappa Thuriappa, G/L.14201.
- Chief Stoker Brynmawr Treharne, D/KX.76560.
- Leading Seaman Arthur George Tucker, D/JX.139718.
- Sergeant (Acting Temporary Company Sergeant Major) Frank Tynan, Royal Marines, PO/X.1599.
- Chief Petty Officer (Temporary) Charles Elliot Vincent, P/J.111529.
- Chief Petty Officer Writer Ernest James Voysey, D/MX.54186.
- Marine (Acting Temporary Sergeant) Ernest Edward Wade, Royal Marines, CH/24033.
- Petty Officer Writer Robert Wallace, P/MX.86886.
- Chief Stoker Leonard Reginald Wanstall, C/K.65138.
- Acting Chief Petty Officer Irving Warhurst, D/SSX.22346.
- Chief Petty Officer Sidney Henry Warwick, D/J.106136.
- Acting Petty Officer Francis Waters, C/J.107327.
- Leading Wren Ethel Watson, WRNS.20237.
- Stoker Petty Officer Percival Thomas Welsh, D/K.65831.
- Chief Electrical Artificer John Ernest Wheeler, D/MX.48890.
- Quartermaster Sergeant Instructor George Robert White, Royal Marines, CH/22607.
- Chief Petty Officer Wren Muriel Wild, WRNS.19244.
- Leading Wren Lilian Alice Wiley, WRNS.9675.
- Chief Petty Officer Wren Elsie Holroyd Wilkinson, WRNS.22289.
- Petty Officer Radio Mechanic Thomas Francis Wynne, P/MX.125092.
- Stores Petty Officer (Temporary) Kenneth Langhorn Yates, D/MX.66805.

Army

- No. 2014271 Corporal Harold Wells Acaster, Royal Army Medical Corps.
- No. 3322688 Sergeant Alfred Agnew, The Black Watch (Royal Highland Regiment).
- No. N/540 Warrant Officer Class I Ahmed Lakiche, East African Reconnaissance Regiment.
- No. 3318520 Corporal Angus Aitchison, The Highland Light Infantry (City of Glasgow Regiment).
- No. 15000818 Staff-Sergeant Archibald John Alchin, Corps of Royal Engineers.
- No. 1941172 Sergeant John Avitt Alexander, Corps of Royal Engineers.
- No. W/163612 Corporal Agnes Gilliland Allan, Auxiliary Territorial Service.
- No. 13907515 Regimental Quartermaster-Sergeant Goolam Hossenkhan Alleear, Mauritius Regiment.
- No. 7648300 Staff-Sergeant Gordon Spencer Allen, Royal Army Ordnance Corps.
- No. 13049528 Company Quartermaster-Sergeant (acting) Howard William Allen, Pioneer Corps.
- No. 7888363 Sergeant Leonard Allen, Royal Tank Regiment, Royal Armoured Corps.
- No. S/2346837 Private Roy Sidney Allen, Royal Army Service Corps.
- No. 3248215 Sergeant Ronald Watson Allison, The Cameronians (Scottish Rifles).
- No. 4755187 Sergeant Robert Arthur Almond, Royal Regiment of Artillery.
- No. 3190707 Sergeant Robert McConachie Anderson, The King's Own Scottish Borderers.
- No. W/32922 Sergeant Ethel May Andrews, Auxiliary Territorial Service.
- No. 14261671 Lance-Corporal John Henry Archer, Corps of Royal Engineers.
- No. C.C./22790 Sergeant Frederick Siegfried Arkhurst, Royal West African Frontier Force.
- No. L/S.C.A./60 Battery Quartermaster-Sergeant Lawrence Arneaud, Royal Regiment of Artillery (Colonial)
- No. 13058367 Warrant Officer Class II (acting) Albert Norman William Arnold, Pioneer Corps.
- No. 542902 Staff-Sergeant Reginald Smith Ash, Royal Regiment of Artillery.
- No. 4615291 Sapper Walter Askham, Corps of Royal Engineers.
- No. W/117904 Corporal Muriel Astin, Auxiliary Territorial Service.
- No. 2094322 Sergeant (acting) Kenneth Aston, Corps of Royal Engineers.
- No. T/262255 Corporal Arthur John Henry Attwooll, Royal Army Service Corps.
- No. 6897167 Sergeant Ernest Bailey, The King's Royal Rifle Corps.
- No. T/211199 Corporal Ernest Walter Baines, Royal Army Service Corps.
- No. 2128517 Sergeant James Irvine Baird, Corps of Royal Engineers.
- No. S/14679456 Sergeant (acting) Frank Banfield, Royal Army Service Corps.
- No. 4808263 Bombardier George Barber, Royal Regiment of Artillery.
- No. 5959177 Company Quartermaster-Sergeant Daniel Silvia Cardoso Barfield, Corps of Royal Engineers.
- No. 14765027 Lance-Corporal Bert Arthur Barker, Royal Army Ordnance Corps.
- No. 2088289 Corporal Harry Barnat, Royal Electrical and Mechanical Engineers.
- No. 2137404 Corporal Joseph Barnes, Corps of Royal Engineers.
- No. 2736809 Lance-Sergeant Leonard James Barns, Welsh Guards.
- No. 854348 Sergeant Victor Francis Barton, Royal Regiment of Artillery.
- No. T/4803085 Staff-Sergeant Frederick William Bass, Royal Army Service Corps.
- No. 7384024 Private Leslie George Baxendale, Royal Army Medical Corps.
- No. S/181996 Staff-Sergeant (acting) Lawrence Baxter, Royal Army Service Corps.
- No. 14289265 Sergeant Frederick Allan Bean, Corps of Royal Engineers.
- No. 3460511 Lance-Corporal George William Beckton, The Lancashire Fusiliers.
- No. 13033826 Company Quartermaster-Sergeant Gordon John Beech, Pioneer Corps.
- No. 13906575 Warrant Officer Class II (acting) Claud Marius Beejoolal, Pioneer Corps.
- No. 10569147 Corporal George Douglas Bell, Royal Electrical and Mechanical Engineers.
- No. L/S.C.A./1123 Sergeant Earl Gotric Bellamy, The Trinidad Regiment.
- No. 7536503 Sergeant (acting) George Thomas Benton, The Army Dental Corps.
- No. 2386038 Corporal William Eltringham Biggins, Royal Corps of Signals.
- No. 1792332 Sergeant (acting) Arthur Billings, Royal Regiment of Artillery.
- No. 10592482 Private George Henry Blacklee, Royal Army Ordnance Corps.
- No. 10587518 Warrant Officer Class II (acting) Percy Edward Blanchard, Royal Army Ordnance Corps.
- No. 1734718 Sergeant Donald Millington Blease, Royal Regiment of Artillery.
- No. 6472638 Sergeant Harry Bloomfield, The Royal Fusiliers (City of London Regiment).
- No. 2129001 Lance-Sergeant Robert Borthwick, Corps of Royal Engineers.
- No. S/73892 Staff-Sergeant Kenneth Samuel Bowbanks, Royal Army Service Corps.
- No. 12986 Sergeant Frederick James Bowman, The Warwickshire Yeomanry, Royal Armoured Corps.
- No. 7520646 Staff-Sergeant George Edward Pelham Box, Royal Army Medical Corps.
- No. 1774661 Sergeant Andrew McKendrick Boyd, Royal Regiment of Artillery.
- No. 808680 Warrant Officer Class II (acting) Reginald Arthur Boyes, Royal Regiment of Artillery.
- No. 5338939 Warrant Officer Class II (acting) George Alexander Boyle, Corps of Royal Engineers.
- No. 7905049 Lance-Sergeant Patrick Joseph Brennan, Royal Armoured Corps.
- No. 927212 Sergeant Lionel John Breton, Royal Regiment of Artillery.
- No. S/7667125 Staff-Sergeant Bernard Brown, Royal Army Service Corps.
- No. 13042112 Sergeant Frank Edward Brown, Pioneer Corps.
- No. 2612226 Lance-Sergeant George Francis John Brown, Grenadier Guards.
- No. 5055382 Lance-Bombardier George Harold Kingsley Brown, Royal Regiment of Artillery.
- No. 2986916 Lance-Corporal George Joseph Bryson, The Seaforth Highlanders (Ross-shire Buffs, The Duke of Albany's).
- No. W/216298 Corporal Barbara Mary Buck, Auxiliary Territorial Service.
- No. 2662557 Sergeant (acting) Arthur Walter Bull, Coldstream Guards.
- No. 10559017 Sergeant Ernest Dimond Burnard, Royal Army Ordnance Corps.
- No. S/14839743 Private Arnold Eustace Burrows, Royal Army Service Corps.
- No. 2013838 Sergeant (acting) Cedric Ivor Burrows, Corps of Royal Engineers.
- No. W/621075 Warrant Officer Class I (acting) Hetty Frances Bursey, Voluntary Aid Detachment.
- No. W/5222 Staff-Sergeant Ruth Burton, Auxiliary Territorial Service.
- No. 5214201 Sergeant (acting) Arthur Henry Cain, Army Air Corps.
- No. 14559655 Lance-Bombardier Harry Thomas Cain, Royal Regiment of Artillery.
- No. 2925655 Sergeant Thomas Cairns, Army Catering Corps.
- No. 91078 Staff-Sergeant Cecil Noble Cameron, Royal Army Ordnance Corps.
- No. 40334 Staff-Sergeant (local) John Camilleri, Royal Malta Artillery.
- No. 1697078 Lance-Bombardier Sidney Henry Cantle, Royal Regiment of Artillery.
- No. 2012483 Lance-Corporal John James Carmichael, Corps of Royal Engineers.
- No. 3246709 Sergeant James Webster Carnegie, The Cameronians (Scottish Rifles).
- No. 14227841 Corporal Frederick Proby Carter, Corps of Royal Engineers.
- No. 1602632 Lance-Bombardier John Lionel Carter, Royal Regiment of Artillery.
- No. W/160407 Warrant Officer Class II (acting) Bessie Fanny Cartwright, Auxiliary Territorial Service.
- No. 5833683 Company Quartermaster-Sergeant Charles Edwin William Castell, Corps of Royal Engineers.
- No. W/632248 Staff-Sergeant Doris Amy Chalcraft, Voluntary Aid Detachment.
- No. 6290244 Staff-Sergeant (acting) Walter Charles Chandler, Corps of Royal Engineers.
- No. S/248972 Sergeant (acting) Louis Charles Chapman, Royal Army Service Corps.
- No. 1538976 Corporal Jesse Chettle, Royal Electrical and Mechanical Engineers.
- No. W/158016 Corporal Joan Chinn, Auxiliary Territorial Service.
- No. Z.B.K./2538 Regimental Sergeant-Major Kamete Chuni, The King's African Rifles.
- No. 2191799 Sergeant (acting) Albert James Clark, Corps of Royal Engineers.
- No. 2336771 Company Quartermaster-Sergeant Benjamin Clay, Royal Corps of Signals.
- No. 831913 Warrant Officer Class II (acting) Wilfrid Clayton, Royal Regiment of Artillery.
- No. S/131179 Staff-Sergeant Henry James Cobb, Royal Army Service Corps.
- No. 1092886 Lance-Sergeant Eric William Collins, Royal Regiment of Artillery.
- No. 4398039 Craftsman James Frederick Collins, Royal Electrical and Mechanical Engineers.
- No. 6846602 Sergeant Roy Comfton, The King's Royal Rifle Corps.
- No. W/2661 Warrant Officer Class II (acting) Elizabeth Mary Conway, Auxiliary Territorial Service.
- No. 1708081 Sergeant Charles Ernest Corbett, Royal Regiment of Artillery.
- No. 2323213 Company Quartermaster-Sergeant William Cornish, Royal Corps of Signals.
- No. 2618069 Sergeant (acting) Alan Roscoe Cottam, Grenadier Guards.
- No. 5956177 Lance-Corporal Herbert Dennis Cousins, The Bedfordshire and Hertfordshire Regiment.
- No. 900551 Lance-Bombardier John McGillowe Coutts, Royal Regiment of Artillery.
- No. 2349163 Sergeant (acting) Horace George Wilberforce Coward, Royal Corps of Signals.
- No. 2371503 Private James Cowell, Army Catering Corps.
- No. 7249730 Corporal Frank Albert Cox, Royal Corps of Signals.
- No. 3135575 Sergeant Thomas Percy Cradock, The Royal Scots Fusiliers.
- No. 2699680 Sergeant William Tait Craig, Scots Guards.
- No. 2585434 Sergeant Edmund John Cresswell, Royal Corps of Signals.
- No. 3717557 Fusilier Francis Harry Crocker, The Royal Fusiliers (City of London Regiment).
- No. 2007000 Corporal Adam Hannah Cross, Corps of Royal Engineers.
- No- 3391374 Sergeant John William Cuff, Royal Regiment of Artillery.
- No. T/10672706 Driver Thomas Harry Culver, Royal Army Service Corps.
- No. 918661 Warrant Officer Class II (acting) Gordon Maclean Currie, Royal Regiment of Artillery.
- No. 2086416 Staff-Sergeant Leslie Herbert Cutts, Royal Regiment of Artillery.
- No. 1911442 Staff-Sergeant George Oswald Dalgetty, Corps of Royal Engineers.
- No. 3326376 Sergeant Harry Pitcairn Dand, The Highland Light Infantry (City of Glasgow Regiment).
- No. T/14604239 Sergeant (acting) Edward Thomas Davies, Royal Army Service Corps.
- No. 2126897 Corporal (acting) Edwin James Davis, Corps of Royal Engineers.
- No. 5249626 Lance-Sergeant Jack Davis, Army Catering Corps.
- No. W/229043 Sergeant Norah Dawber, Auxiliary Territorial Service.
- No. 1888056 Sergeant George Wallace Dawn, Corps of Royal Engineers.
- No. 2582826 Sergeant Arthur James Day, Royal Corps of Signals.
- No. 7880890 Squadron Quartermaster-Sergeant Joseph Dean, Royal Tank Regiment, Royal Armoured Corps.
- No. 7263151 Sergeant (acting) Henry Gaston Albert Victor Demont, Royal Army Medical Corps.
- No. 15963 Company Havildar-Major Desman Rai, MM, 10th Gurkha Rifles, Indian Army.
- No. 3250065 Sergeant William Rule Dickson, The Cameronians (Scottish Rifles).
- No. 14561531 Signalman Frank Bernard Dilworth, MM, Royal Corps of Signals.
- No. W/4601 Staff-Sergeant Dinah Dorsey, Auxiliary Territorial Service.
- No. 7662047 Warrant Officer Class II (acting) John Christopher Doyle, Royal Army Pay Corps.
- No. 1128019 Corporal Norman William Drew, Royal Army Ordnance Corps.
- No. 15289 Havildar Bertie D'Souza, Indian General Service Corps.
- No. 7621189 Corporal John Duncan, Royal Electrical and Mechanical Engineers.
- No. 7396941 Corporal Richard George Dunn, Royal Army Medical Corps.
- No. 7363607 Warrant Officer Class II (acting) Albert Eric James Durant, Royal Army Medical Corps.
- No. S/164009 Sergeant (acting) Henry Joseph Eastham, Royal Army Service Corps.
- No. W/92625 Staff-Sergeant Ethel Margaret Ede, Auxiliary Territorial Service.
- No. W/265471 Lance-Sergeant Doris Eden, Auxiliary Territorial Service.
- No. W/73532 Warrant Officer Class II (acting) Margaret Edge, Auxiliary Territorial Service.
- No. 1883240 Lance-Sergeant Horace Donald Edwards, DCM, Corps of Royal Engineers.
- No. 15781 Battery Sergeant-Major Michael Elimby, The Nigeria Regiment, Royal West African Frontier Force.
- No. 1922804 Corporal Edward John Charles Ellis, Corps of Royal Engineers.
- No. 5384614 Sergeant Robert Emmett, Corps of Royal Engineers.
- No. U/284 Warrant Officer Class I Kibikyo Enusi, The King's African Rifles.
- No. 1901582 Warrant Officer Class II (acting) Emrys Evans, Corps of Royal Engineers.
- No. W/29481 Sergeant Molly Elsie Faiers, Auxiliary Territorial Service.
- No. 7537309 Sergeant Leonard Mark Fairhead, The Army Dental Corps.
- No. 1551870 Bombardier James Falconer, Royal Regiment of Artillery.
- Staff Quartermaster-Sergeant Fathi, Trans-Jordan Frontier Force.
- No. S/6092283 Warrant Officer Class I (acting) Charles William John Faulkner, Royal Army Service Corps.
- No. 4745877 Warrant Officer Class II (acting) Harold Faxon, The York and Lancaster Regiment.
- No. W/42919 Staff-Sergeant Martha Elizabeth Fee, Auxiliary Territorial Service.
- No. 1458492 Sergeant Samuel Johnston Fergus, Royal Regiment of Artillery.
- No. 6917805 Sergeant John Ridley Ferguson, The Rifle Brigade (Prince Consort's Own).
- No. 7373883 Corporal Harry Ferrie, Royal Army Medical Corps.
- No. 7665470 Sergeant Stanley John Ferrige, The Royal Fusiliers (City of London Regiment).
- No. W/150699 Sergeant (acting) Joan Edith Florence Ferriman, Auxiliary Territorial Service.
- No. S/14236095 Corporal Arthur Stanley Field, Royal Army Service Corps.
- No. 973742 Staff-Sergeant Arthur Watson Fielding, Corps of Royal Engineers.
- No. 14344975 Corporal (acting) Patrick Finn, Royal Corps of Signals.
- No. 2128046 Lance-Sergeant John Fisher, Corps of Royal Engineers.
- No. 4277728 Sergeant John Robinson Fishwick, Royal Regiment of Artillery.
- No. W/216885 Warrant Officer Class II (acting) Gweneth Enid Fitch, Auxiliary Territorial Service.
- No. 3861194 Staff-Sergeant Robert Dawson Fletcher, Corps of Royal Engineers.
- No. 14215765 Sergeant (acting) Robert Gordon Ian Forrest, Intelligence Corps.
- No. 322056 Sergeant John William Foster, Royal Regiment of Artillery.
- No. W/206382 Sergeant Mollie Gwendoline Fowler, Auxiliary Territorial Service.
- No. 2078673 Sapper Jack Harold Fox, Corps of Royal Engineers.
- No. 2818783 Colour-Sergeant Douglas Fraser, The Seaforth Highlanders (Ross-shire Buffs, The Duke of Albany's).
- No. 2612855 Sergeant Arthur Freed, Royal Regiment of Artillery.
- No. W/82272 Lance-Corporal Dorothy Frith, Auxiliary Territorial Service.
- No. 3247951 Warrant Officer Class II (acting) John Simpson Fulton, The Cameronians (Scottish Rifles).
- No. 6459714 Sergeant Walter Alfred Furse, Army Catering Corps.
- No. 7367379 Corporal Cyril Frederick Garbett, Royal Army Medical Corps.
- No. 2118902 Sergeant (acting) Peter Wilton Garbutt, Corps of Royal Engineers.
- No. 2128050 Lance-Sergeant Peter John Major Gardner, Corps of Royal Engineers.
- No. W/20716 Warrant Officer Class II (acting) Bridget Mary Garry, Auxiliary Territorial Service.
- No. 7577015 Sergeant Hector Ronald Giddens, Royal Army Ordnance Corps.
- No. 2191779 Company Quartermaster-Sergeant (acting) Harold Douglas Gisborne, Corps of Royal Engineers.
- No. W/254367 Private Florence May Goodard, Auxiliary Territorial Service.
- No. S/4752529 Staff-Sergeant (acting) Charles Frederick Goodall, Royal Army Service Corps.
- No. 3389415 Sergeant (acting) Albert Ralph Lodell Goodfellow, The East Lancashire Regiment.
- No. 6204464 Warrant Officer Class II (acting) Kenneth Donald Goodhew, Royal Army Pay Corps.
- No. 7920498 Warrant Officer Class II (acting) Stephen Frederick Goodyear, Intelligence Corps.
- No. W/235986 Sergeant Edith Marguerite Gori, Auxiliary Territorial Service.
- No. W/188734 Corporal Joan Graham, Auxiliary Territorial Service.
- No. S/1879930 Staff-Sergeant Eric Arthur Grainger, Royal Army Service Corps.
- No. 2126919 Lance-Corporal Sidney John Grant, Corps of Royal Engineers.
- No. 135702 Warrant Officer Class II (acting) Granville Grayer, Intelligence Corps.
- No. 6015645 Warrant Officer Class II (acting) Arthur Alfred Green, Royal Regiment of Artillery.
- No. 7379085 Corporal Ronald Stanley Green, Army Catering Corps.
- No. 3136139 Warrant Officer Class II (acting) James Moffet Greenshields, The Royal Scots (The Royal Regiment).
- No. S/892234 Corporal Paul Brian Gregory, Royal Army Service Corps.
- No. 4194548 Sergeant (acting) John Griffiths, The Royal Welch Fusiliers.
- No. W/15874 Warrant Officer Class II (acting) Menai Griffiths, Auxiliary Territorial Service.
- No. 950355 Company Quartermaster-Sergeant William Henry Grimley, Corps of Royal Engineers.
- No. 638 Havildar Gul Zaman, 6th Rajputana Rifles, Indian Army.
- Volunteer Gurmukh Singh, Uganda Defence Force.
- No. 2576183 Sergeant (acting) Wilfred Habberfield-Short, Royal Corps of Signals.
- No. 14547375 Private Alec Hallam, The York and Lancaster Regiment.
- No. W/172204 Sergeant Henrietta Halliday, Auxiliary Territorial Service.
- No. W/99110 Staff-Sergeant Dorothy May Hammond, Auxiliary Territorial Service.
- No. 2015739 Driver George Edward Hansell, Corps of Royal Engineers.
- No. 2176 Naik Haribahadur Thapa, Corps of Military Police, Indian Army.
- No. 2592953 Sergeant (acting) Walter George James Harper, Royal Corps of Signals.
- No. 14362196 Sergeant (acting) Albert Edward Harris, Royal Army Ordnance Corps.
- No. 8/10692699 Staff-Sergeant James Noel Harrison, Royal Army Service Corps.
- No. 2191715 Sergeant Hugh George Hartshorn, Corps of Royal Engineers.
- No, 2120476 Warrant Officer Class II (acting) Albert Charles Hersom, Royal Electrical and Mechanical Engineers.
- No. W/15383 Sergeant Violet Elsie Hickman, Auxiliary Territorial Service.
- No. W/35453 Sergeant Bessie Sarah Hiddleston, Auxiliary Territorial Service.
- No. 2378505 Sergeant Charles Edwin Hill, Royal Corps of Signals.
- No. 7652470 Warrant Officer Class II (acting) Leonard Herbert Hillier, Royal Army Ordnance Corps.
- No. 4467368 Sergeant (acting) William Hilton, The Queen's Own Cameron Highlanders.
- No. 5511725 Lance-Corporal Walter William Henry Hobbs, Corps of Royal Engineers.
- No. 972901 Sergeant Joseph Hodgson, Royal Regiment of Artillery.
- No. 7639015 Warrant Officer Class I (acting) Kenneth Richmond Holder, Royal Electrical and Mechanical Engineers.
- No. 7390619 Sergeant Ernest Holdsworth, Royal Army Medical Corps.
- No. 325805 Sergeant Frank Henry Holland, The Nottinghamshire Yeomanry, Royal Armoured Corps.
- No. T/169447 Mechanist Staff-Sergeant Christopher Holme, Royal Army Service Corps.
- No. W/794045 Sergeant Eleanor Irene Holmes, Voluntary Aid Detachment.
- No. T/140723 Company Quartermaster-Sergeant (acting) Harold Holmes, Royal Army Service Corps.
- No. 4105440 Sergeant Norman Stuart Holmes, The North Staffordshire Regiment (The Prince of Wales's).
- No. 13032292 Sergeant Ernest Clarence Hooper, Royal Regiment of Artillery.
- No. S/3770918 Warrant Officer Class I (acting) Edgar Edward Horne, Royal Army Service Corps.
- No. S/82097 Staff-Sergeant (acting) Ronald Cecil Hornsby, Royal Army Service Corps.
- No. 5624063 Sergeant Reginald Thomas Hosking, Royal Regiment of Artillery.
- No. 7617507 Corporal Arthur Hughes, Royal Army Ordnance Corps.
- No. 2582148 Lance-Sergeant Peter Brown Humpherson, Royal Corps of Signals.
- No. 7659727 Staff-Sergeant Francis Leslie Hunt, Royal Army Pay Corps.
- No. 1866873 Staff-Sergeant Joseph Stewart Harding Huxley, Royal Electrical and Mechanical Engineers.
- No. T/269600 Company Quartermaster-Sergeant (acting) Ronald William Ingarfield, Royal Army Service Corps.
- No. 2120483 Sergeant Albert James William Jackett, Corps of Royal Engineers.
- No. 891575 Staff-Sergeant (acting) George Kenneth Jackson, Royal Regiment of Artillery.
- No. 2119399 Sapper James George Jackson, Corps of Royal Engineers.
- No. 3251257 Sergeant William Jackson, The Cameronians (Scottish Rifles).
- No. 980240 Staff-Sergeant (acting) Douglas Arthur James, Royal Regiment of Artillery.
- No. 1444431 Sergeant Morrison Lionel James, Royal Regiment of Artillery.
- No. L/S.C.A./5245 Sergeant (acting) Ewart Fitz-Herbert Jeffrey, The Caribbean Regiment.
- No. 1756537 Sergeant Brinley Idris Jenkins, Royal Regiment of Artillery.
- No. 6019028 Colour-Sergeant Robert Alfred Jenkins, Army Air Corps.
- No. 14323318 Corporal Charles Scott Jerome, Royal Army Ordnance Corps.
- No. 13052885 Lance-Corporal Stanley Johns, Pioneer Corps.
- No. 3251409 Warrant Officer Class II (acting) Arnold Paterson Johnston, The Cameronians (Scottish Rifles).
- No. 2983064 Colour-Sergeant William David Johnston, The Argyll and Sutherland Highlanders (Princess Louise's).
- No. 1444434 Sergeant Randolph Jones, Royal Corps of Signals.
- No. 1511762 Gunner Richard Emlyn Jones, Royal Regiment of Artillery.
- No. 31197 Havildar Karnad Rama Shripad Rao, Corps of Indian Engineers.
- No. 1538407 Corporal James Henry Kays, Royal Electrical and Mechanical Engineers.
- No. 2716568 Company Quartermaster-Sergeant William Kearney, Irish Guards.
- No. 1504737 Sergeant Frank James Keeler, Royal Regiment of Artillery.
- No. W/236456 Lance-Corporal Betty Mary Kemp, Auxiliary Territorial Service.
- No. S/290441 Warrant Officer Class I (acting) Arthur John Cleghorn Kendall, Royal Army Service Corps.
- No. 7595626 Staff-Sergeant Gordon John Kene, Royal Electrical and Mechanical Engineers.
- No. 7653010 Warrant Officer Class I (acting) Harold Kewn, Royal Army Ordnance Corps.
- No. E.C./8567 Warrant Officer Class I Kgamane Rasebolai, African Pioneer Corps.
- No. W/16752 Warrant Officer Class II (acting) Eileen Theresa King, Auxiliary Territorial Service.
- No. 242845 Sergeant William Frederick King, Royal Electrical and Mechanical Engineers.
- No. 7637088 Craftsman Maurice Kingsnorth, Royal Electrical and Mechanical Engineers.
- No. S/2596795 Warrant Officer Class II (acting) Albert Edward Kirby, Royal Army Service Corps.
- No. 1086336 Bombardier James Kirk, Royal Regiment of Artillery.
- No. 1079539 Battery Quartermaster-Sergeant (acting) Emil Klener, Royal Regiment of Artillery.
- No. 1946393 Staff-Sergeant (acting) Dennis William Knott, Corps of Royal Engineers.
- No. 5442073 Sergeant Cyril Jeffery Lakeman, The Wiltshire Regiment.
- No. G.C./15319 Sergeant Robert Odartey Lamkai-Lamptey, The Gold Coast Regiment, Royal West African Frontier Force.
- No. 1474717 Sergeant Leslie Charles Langham, Royal Corps of Signals.
- No. T/10696447 Corporal (acting) Ernest Layfield, Royal Army Service Corps.
- No. 2579011 Signalman Alfred James Leicester, Royal Corps of Signals.
- No. A.S./6716 Warrant Officer Class II J. Leleka, African Pioneer Corps.
- No. W/86407 Sergeant Margaret Duff Leven, Auxiliary Territorial Service.
- No. 1923741 Warrant Officer Class II (acting) Leslie Charles Lewis, Corps of Royal Engineers.
- No. 1888455 Company Quartermaster-Sergeant Walter Ernest Lillyman, Corps of Royal Engineers.
- No. 10575292 Corporal Charles Lincoln, Army Catering Corps.
- No. 2038373 Corporal Dennis Arthur Little, Corps of Royal Engineers.
- No. W/111262 Sergeant Violet Millicent Littlewood, Auxiliary Territorial Service.
- No. S/14624935 Sergeant Frank Melville Lloyd, Royal Army Service Corps.
- No. 2720627 Company Quartermaster-Sergeant Thomas Lofthouse, Irish Guards.
- No. 13066797 Corporal Victor Lowenhoff, Royal Army Ordnance Corps.
- No. 7688333 Sergeant Reginald Gordon Lucas, Corps of Military Police.
- No. W/3426 Sergeant (acting) Kathleen Lusher, Auxiliary Territorial Service.
- No. 2653751 Warrant Officer Class II (acting) William Henry Lyddiatt, Coldstream Guards.
- No. 550153 Sergeant (acting) Walter James Lynn, Corps of Military Police.
- No. 2386052 Lance-Sergeant Guy Lister Macavoy, Royal Corps of Signals.
- No. 14402740 Sergeant John Mackintosh, Royal Army Ordnance Corps.
- No. 14314569 Signalman Craig Johnston Macpherson, Royal Corps of Signals.
- No. 3316006 Sergeant James Tennant Main, The Highland Light Infantry (City of Glasgow Regiment).
- No. 14715875 Private Albert Ernest Manser, Royal Army Ordnance Corps.
- No. 14568468 Bombardier Denis William Marriott, Royal Regiment of Artillery.
- No: 2744882 Staff-Sergeant Gerald Joseph Varley Marshall, Military Provost Staff Corps.
- No. 1612952 Warrant Officer Class II (acting) George Wicks Marshall, Royal Regiment of Artillery.
- No. 14208084 Lance-Corporal Thomas Mason. Royal Corps of Signals.
- No. 2063892 Lance-Corporal Ivie McCaig, Corps of Royal Engineers.
- No. 7011341 Warrant Officer Class II (acting) Joseph Gerald McCrory, The Royal Ulster Rifles.
- No. 2824033 Lance-Sergeant James McGowan, The Seaforth Highlanders (Ross-shire Buffs, The Duke of Albany's).
- No. 10569473 Warrant Officer Class I (acting) Thomas Duff McGregor, Royal Army Ordnance Corps.
- No. W/55351 Staff-Sergeant Margaret Isabella McPherson, Auxiliary Territorial Service.
- No. 1944962 Sergeant Albert Mee, Corps of Royal Engineers.
- No. W/184190 Warrant Officer Class II (acting) Elsie Violet Mellor, Auxiliary Territorial Service.
- No. 4859409 Sergeant Richard Millington, The Leicestershire Regiment.
- No. 2337186 Sergeant Charles Mills, Royal Corps of Signals.
- No. T/194450 Warrant Officer Class II (acting) Robert William Mills, Royal Army Service Corps.
- No. W/176772 Staff-Sergeant Lorna Milnes, Auxiliary Territorial Service.
- No. 14642528 Signalman Donald Riseley Moon, Royal Corps of Signals.
- No. 14573910 Corporal Bernard Moorcroft, Corps of Royal Engineers.
- No. 3967828 Staff-Sergeant (acting) Hector Morgan, Military Provost Staff Corps.
- No. 217366 Sergeant Robert Anthony Morgan, Royal Regiment of Artillery.
- No. 1918105 Sergeant William Samuel Morgan, Corps of Royal Engineers.
- No. 13096555 Colour-Sergeant (acting) Abraham Morofsky, Pioneer Corps.
- No. S/6462608 Staff-Sergeant Stanley Morrison, Royal Army Service Corps.
- No. 878895 Warrant Officer Class II (acting) Leonard John Morse, Royal Regiment of Artillery.
- No. 2877776 Corporal Hector Anderson Morton, Royal Corps of Signals.
- No. 2334984 Sergeant Leonard Ashton Moseley, Royal Corps of Signals.
- No. S/6025944 Sergeant James John Murdin, Royal Army Service Corps.
- No. 2877906 Warrant Officer Class II (acting) Alexander Longmoor Murray, Royal Regiment of Artillery.
- No. 4346102 Private Bryce Murray, The East Yorkshire Regiment (The Duke of York's Own).
- No. T/10664380 Lance-Corporal James Murray, Royal Army Service Corps.
- No. 526995 Havildar Muzaffar Ali, Indian Pioneer Corps.
- No. 2332972 Lance-Corporal Harry John Myford, Royal Corps of Signals.
- No. 217370 Sergeant Maurice Slater Myram, Royal Regiment of Artillery.
- No. 5345198 Sergeant (acting) William Albert Frederick Nason, The Oxfordshire and Buckinghamshire Light Infantry.
- No. W/90968 Sergeant Zena Dorothy Neate, Auxiliary Territorial Service.
- No. 7256754 Sergeant George William Newcombe, Royal Regiment of Artillery.
- No. 7665024 Staff-Sergeant Leonard Alfred Newell, Royal Army Pay Corps.
- No. 2590903 Sergeant Bevan Newling, Royal Corps of Signals.
- No. 6406370 Sergeant John Newnham, Corps of Military Police.
- No. 97005578 Warrant Officer Class II (acting) William Francis Newton, Royal Army Ordnance Corps.
- No. 7260577 Staff-Sergeant Alfred James Nicholas, Royal Army Medical Corps.
- No. 8/5825817 Staff-Sergeant (acting) William Henry Nicholson, Royal Army Service Corps.
- No. 14329322 Sergeant Robert Edgar Nuttall, Royal Army Ordnance Corps.
- No. 17405 Regimental Sergeant-Major Phillipo O'Ketch, The King's African Rifles.
- No. W/154550 Sergeant Dorothy Mary Oliver, Auxiliary Territorial Service.
- No. 5256677 Corporal Frederick William Orme, The King's Regiment (Liverpool).
- No. 2334043 Corporal Donald Ounsley, Royal Corps of Signals.
- No. 16216 Company Havildar-Major Padam Jang Rai, 10th Gurkha Rifles, Indian Army.
- No. 921970 Corpora] Alfred George Payne, Royal Electrical and Mechanical Engineers.
- No. 14384553 Corporal (acting) Harold Walker Peacock, Corps of Royal Engineers.
- No. 51074 Corporal Allan Marshall Pearson, Royal Army Ordnance Corps.
- No. W/101765 Sergeant Gladys Ruby Pegge, Auxiliary Territorial Service.
- No. S/7915432 Warrant Officer Class II (acting) Ronald Henry Charles Pegrum, Royal Army Service Corps.
- No. 7345987 Staff-Sergeant (acting) Charles Gordon Pennant, Royal Army Medical Corps.
- No. 7604481 Staff-Sergeant Fred Penzer, Royal Electrical and Mechanical Engineers.
- No. 2598742 Corporal Henry Rowland Perry, Royal Corps of Signals.
- No. L.N./1399 Regimental Sergeant-Major Dinga Peter, African Pioneer Corps.
- No. 271423 Warrant Officer Class II (acting) Gilbert Harold Pike, Royal Electrical and Mechanical Engineers.
- No. 1604578 Sergeant (acting) John George Pitts, Royal Regiment of Artillery
- No. 1900120 Sergeant Cyril Pomeroy, Corps of Royal Engineers.
- No. W/50682 Staff-Sergeant Ethel Emma Porter, Auxiliary Territorial Service.
- No. 6984102 Sergeant Henry Haydn Porter, Royal Army Ordnance Corps.
- No. S/87411 Staff-Sergeant (acting) Samuel Wilson Porter, Royal Army Service Corps.
- No. 2113945 Sergeant (acting) Bertram Powell, Corps of Royal Engineers.
- No. W/274411 Corporal Hazel Edwina Prescott, Auxiliary Territorial Service.
- No. S/293199 Sergeant Reginald George Preston, Royal Army Service Corps.
- No. S/14733093 Corporal (acting) Sidney Richard Price, Royal Army Service Corps.
- No. 14346032 Staff-Sergeant Frank Prime, Corps of Royal Engineers.
- No. 14336572 Lance-Sergeant Horace Priston, Corps of Royal Engineers.
- No. 7651634 Sergeant Stephen Owen Pritchard, Royal Electrical and Mechanical Engineers.
- No. S/168090 Staff-Sergeant Francis John Procter, Royal Army Service Corps.
- No. 4983262 Sergeant Ronald Pugsley, The Sherwood Foresters (Nottinghamshire and Derbyshire Regiment).
- No. 733335 Sergeant Leonard Thomas Pyke, Royal Corps of Signals.
- No. W/116042 Staff-Sergeant Joan Elsie Quilliam, Auxiliary Territorial Service.
- No. W/152396 Lance-Corporal Mary Florence Rackley, Auxiliary Territorial Service.
- No. 2582016 Sergeant (acting) Robert Rae, Royal Corps of Signals.
- No. W/101832 Sergeant Winifred Rainnie, Auxiliary Territorial Service.
- No. 18109 Havildar Raman Kutty Nair, Corps of Indian Engineers.
- No. S/14642118 Corporal John Lythgoe Readett, Royal Army Service Corps.
- No. W/58667 Warrant Officer Class II (acting) Sarah Margaret Redman, Auxiliary Territorial Service.
- No. 2387826 Lance-Sergeant William Alexander Reed, Royal Corps of Signals.
- No. 5339988 Corporal Geoffrey James Reeves, The Royal Welch Fusiliers.
- No. 4688151 Sergeant Harry Regan, Corps of Royal Engineers.
- No. 1678610 Sergeant Frederick Charles Reynolds, Royal Regiment of Artillery
- No. 2127095 Sapper Arthur James Richards, Corps of Royal Engineers.
- No. 895903 Sergeant William Robert Richards, Royal Regiment of Artillery.
- No. 821346 Sergeant Leslie Richardson, Royal Regiment of Artillery.
- No. L/B.D.A./15 Sergeant Ulric Pearman Richardson, The Caribbean Regiment.
- No. W/65365 Corporal Lilian Violet Rickett, Auxiliary Territorial Service.
- No. 7374662 Staff-Sergeant James Richard Riddle, Royal Army Medical Corps.
- No. 2126813 Sergeant Albert Edward Rider, Corps of Royal Engineers.
- No. T/10675464 Sergeant Eric Hector Riley, Royal Army Service Corps.
- No. 994820 Battery Quartermaster-Sergeant (acting) Robert Brabender Ritchie, Royal Regiment of Artillery.
- No. W/55079 Sergeant Harriet Roberts, Auxiliary Territorial Service.
- No. 2822523 Sergeant (acting) William Edward Robertson, The Seaforth Highlanders (Ross-shire Buffs, The Duke of Albany's).
- No. 6148043 Lance-Sergeant Ernest Charles Robins, Coldstream Guards.
- No. S/5735258 Sergeant (acting) Alex Reginald Robinson, Royal Army Service Corps.
- No. S/1576397 Staff-Sergeant Ernest Henry Robson, Royal Army Service Corps.
- No. T/122007 Sergeant Peter Robson, Royal Army Service Corps.
- No. S/7928076 Sergeant Alfred Grafton Rogers, Royal Army Service Corps.
- No. 14524293 Lance-Corporal Frederick Thomas Rolfe, Corps of Royal Engineers.
- No. T/234495 Corporal Ian Alistair Ross, Royal Army Service Corps.
- No. 14440946 Corporal Vivian Claude Rowe, Intelligence Corps.
- No. W/127695 Staff-Sergeant Peggy Alison Rundle, Auxiliary Territorial Service.
- No. 5388552 Sergeant Cyril Gerald Rush. The Oxfordshire and Buckinghamshire Light Infantry.
- No. 2330068 Sergeant (acting) James Stirling Russell, Royal Corps of Signals.
- No. 2347296 Warrant Officer Class II (acting) Percival William Rye, Royal Corps of Signals.
- No. 13080414 Warrant Officer Class I (acting) Frank Sainsbury, Pioneer Corps.
- No. M.355 Warrant Officer Class II Saleh Shohezi, East African Army Medical Corps.
- No. 1946145 Staff-Sergeant (acting) Bernard Asher Samson, Corps of Royal Engineers.
- No. 6968579 Warrant Officer Class II (acting) Jack Saunders, The Sherwood Foresters (Nottinghamshire and Derbyshire Regiment).
- No. 5776113 Warrant Officer Class II (acting) Ernest William Savill, Pioneer Corps.
- No. S/239630 Sergeant Albert Sayers, Royal Army Service Corps.
- No. 1922242 Lance-Sergeant Charles Scoltock, Corps of Royal Engineers.
- No. 7612675 Staff-Sergeant (acting) Joseph Edward Scott, Royal Electrical and Mechanical Engineers.
- No. 1931041 Warrant Officer Class II (acting) Thomas George Searle, Corps of Royal Engineers.
- No. W/135320 Warrant Officer Class II (acting) Jessie Edna Sharp, Auxiliary Territorial Service.
- No. 14276452 Lance-Sergeant Leonard Shaw, Corps of Royal Engineers.
- No. W/236344 Sergeant Joan Vera Shead, Auxiliary Territorial Service.
- No. 328145 Sergeant (acting) Colin Shenton, The Nottinghamshire Yeomanry, Royal Armoured Corps.
- No. 7661971 Staff-Sergeant Samuel Sheppard, Royal Army Pay Corps.
- No. W/115582 Sergeant Camilla Shippam, Auxiliary Territorial Service.
- No. 5506395 Lance-Corporal Alfred Sidney Shorter, Royal Electrical and Mechanical Engineers.
- No. W/4534 Sergeant Constance Simons, Auxiliary Territorial Service.
- No. 13065311 Lance-Corporal Walter Edgar Simpkins, Royal Army Ordnance Corps.
- No. W/238986 Warrant Officer Class II (acting) Agnes Stewart Skeoch, Auxiliary Territorial Service.
- No. 6020247 Sergeant Walter Skidmore, The Royal Fusiliers (City of London Regiment).
- No. 3196551 Staff-Sergeant James Sloan, Corps of Royal Engineers.
- No. 2359030 Warrant Officer Class I (acting) Ronald Smart, Royal Corps of Signals.
- No. 1900853 Company Quartermaster-Sergeant (acting) Donald Kay Smith, Corps of Royal Engineers.
- No. W/42434 Corporal Eva Marie Smith, Auxiliary Territorial Service.
- No. S/14268060 Warrant Officer Class I (acting) Herbert Smith, Royal Army Service Corps.
- No. 10544108 Sergeant (acting) Hubert Meyrick Smith, Royal Army Ordnance Corps.
- No. 5780483 Warrant Officer Class II (acting) James Smith, Royal Army Medical Corps.
- No. W/41265 Sergeant Joyce Elizabeth Smith, Auxiliary Territorial Service.
- No. W/127954 Sergeant (acting) Nesta Smith, Auxiliary Territorial Service.
- No. S/277377 Sergeant (local) Thomas Alfred Smith, Royal Army Service Corps.
- No. 2128535 Sergeant Walter James Smith, Corps of Royal Engineers.
- No. S/14588268 Corporal William Smith, Royal Army Service Corps.
- No. 3320362 Lance-Corporal Albert Edwin Snaith, The Royal Scots Greys (2nd Dragoons), Royal Armoured Corps.
- No. 7008255 Colour-Sergeant Isaac Wilkinson Snoddon, The Royal Ulster Rifles.
- No. 1443570 Sergeant (acting) William Joseph Hayden Sobey, Corps of Royal Engineers.
- No. 3857957 Sergeant (local) Harry Speak, Corps of Royal Engineers.
- No. S/10706862 Corporal Arthur Geoffrey Spencer, Royal Army Service Corps.
- No. T/90443 Mechanist Staff-Sergeant Albert Edward Spong, Royal Army Service Corps.
- No. 956376 Bombardier John David Squires, Royal Regiment of Artillery.
- No. 7880082 Warrant Officer Class II (acting) Thomas Frederick Stagey, Royal Tank Regiment, Royal Armoured Corps.
- No. 6846985 Sergeant Eric Stally, The King's Royal Rifle Corps.
- No. S/231112 Private John Edward Stapleton, Royal Army Service Corps.
- No. 1981228 Warrant Officer Class II (acting) Ernest William Steadman, Corps of Royal Engineers.
- No. 2014040 Corporal George Robert Steer, Corps of Royal Engineers.
- No. T/4132923 Staff-Sergeant (acting) Thomas Stelfox, Royal Army Service Corps.
- No. 2126960 Corporal James Stephens, Corps of Royal Engineers.
- No. 13024267 Staff-Sergeant (acting) Edward Victor Stephenson, Pioneer Corps.
- No. S/290127 Sergeant (acting) Ivan Asher Stephenson, Royal Army Service Corps.
- No. 901145 Sergeant Frederick James Stevenson, Royal Regiment of Artillery.
- No. W/125169 Sergeant Annie Masterton Stewart, Auxiliary Territorial Service.
- No. 2010699 Sergeant William Stewart, Corps of Royal Engineers.
- No. 2130369 Lance-Sergeant Wilfred Stout, Corps of Royal Engineers.
- No. 13060855 Sergeant Wilson Windle Straw, Pioneer Corps.
- No. W.A.C./8580 Staff-Sergeant Enid Stuart, Women's Auxiliary Corps (India).
- No. S/7382507 Sergeant (acting) Jack Havard Styling, Royal Army Service Corps.
- No. W/84671 Warrant Officer Class II (acting) Winifred Summerson, Auxiliary Territorial Service.
- No. S/3252584 Warrant Officer Class II (acting) James Sunley, Royal Army Service Corps.
- No. W/173883 Sergeant Florence Margorie Swift, Auxiliary Territorial Service.
- No. 271842 Lance-Corporal Arthur Henry Talbot, Corps of Royal Engineers.
- No. W/173884 Staff-Sergeant Frances Monica Tattersall, Auxiliary Territorial Service.
- No. 552083 Squadron Quartermaster-Sergeant (acting) Charles Taylor, Royal Armoured Corps.
- No. 2366608 Sergeant (acting) Francis Henry Taylor, Royal Corps of Signals.
- No. 3536003 Lance-Sergeant Harry Taylor, Army Catering Corps.
- No. 7406055 Sergeant Ronald Taylor, Royal Army Medical Corps.
- No. 2068086 Sergeant Gordon Tennant, Corps of Royal Engineers.
- No. 7621833 Staff-Sergeant John Stephen Tester, Royal Electrical and Mechanical Engineers.
- No. 10576480 Corporal (acting) Frank Pirie Thom, Royal Electrical and Mechanical Engineers.
- No. 1879227 Corporal Sydney Melville Thomas, Corps of Royal Engineers.
- No. 2342508 Lance-Sergeant Alan Thompson, Royal Corps of Signals.
- No. W/28635 Staff-Sergeant Evelyn Thompson, Auxiliary Territorial Service.
- No. S/172567 Staff-Sergeant (acting) Henry John Thompson, Royal Army Service Corps.
- No. 158237 Warrant Officer Class II (acting) Percy Ivor Douglas Tombleson, Corps of Royal Engineers.
- No. W/135626 Warrant Officer Class II (acting) Dorothy Frances Tomlin, Auxiliary Territorial Service.
- No. 10570613 Staff-Sergeant George Arthur Tracey, Royal Army Ordnance Corps.
- No. 7589288 Sergeant Alan John Tribbick. Royal Army Ordnance Corps.
- No. 1924836 Lance-Corporal John Edward Tuff, Corps of Royal Engineers.
- No. 2336275 Corporal Eric Wilfred Turner, Royal Corps of Signals.
- No. 14355049 Sergeant (acting) John Arthur Turtle, Royal Armoured Corps.
- No. 4982676 Sergeant Albert Leslie Twist, The Sherwood Foresters (Nottinghamshire and Derbyshire Regiment).
- No. 1427226 Lance-Sergeant John George Upton, Corps of Royal Engineers.
- No. S/269849 Staff-Sergeant Hugh Ronald Henry Vincent, Royal Army Service Corps.
- No. 1924708 Sergeant Roy Edgar Vincent, Corps of Royal Engineers.
- No. 5393436 Lance-Corporal Sidney Edwin Vincent, The Oxfordshire and Buckinghamshire Light Infantry.
- No. 14404447 Corporal Raymond Samuel Waite, Royal Army Ordnance Corps.
- No. T/265294 Mechanist Staff-Sergeant Edward Walker, Royal Army Service Corps.
- No. 952456 Lance-Sergeant Kenneth Charles Walker, Royal Regiment of Artillery.
- No. 2824815 Sergeant (acting) Edward Norman Wall, The Seaforth Highlanders (Ross-shire Buffs, The Duke of Albany's).
- No. 2069525 Sergeant George William Wall, Corps of Royal Engineers.
- No. 7016105 Sergeant (acting) John Douglas Wallace, The Royal Ulster Rifles.
- No. 974060 Staff-Sergeant David Robert Waller, Royal Regiment of Artillery.
- No. 2343837 Corporal Eric Orville Walsh, Royal Corps of Signals.
- No. W/176353 Corporal Freda Rosalie Warner, Auxiliary Territorial Service.
- No. S/136215 Sergeant (acting) Harry Ralph Warren, Royal Army Service Corps.
- No. 1124092 Bombardier Clifford Waterhouse, Royal Regiment of Artillery.
- No. 856967 Bombardier (acting) Cyril Frederick Watkin, Royal Regiment of Artillery.
- No. 3312638 Sergeant John Weatherston, The Highland Light Infantry (City of Glasgow Regiment).
- No. 10350995 Warrant Officer Class II (acting) Charles Frederick Weaver, Intelligence Corps.
- No. 2078344 Corporal (acting) Albert William Webb, Corps of Royal Engineers.
- No. W/28399 Staff-Sergeant Barbara Webster, Auxiliary Territorial Service.
- No. 13059108 Company Quartermaster-Sergeant Benjamin Taze Webster, Pioneer Corps.
- No. 1551774 Sergeant John Greensfield Weir, Royal Regiment of Artillery.
- No. W/257794 Corporal Gladys Kathleen Welch, Auxiliary Territorial Service.
- No. T/170530 Lance-Sergeant John Edward Welch, Royal Army Service Corps.
- No. 969354 Lance-Sergeant Geoffrey Albert Gunn Wellard, Royal Regiment of Artillery.
- No. W/55956 Sergeant Gwendoline Molly Wells, Auxiliary Territorial Service.
- No. 951838 Sergeant John Coulthurst Wells, Corps of Royal Engineers.
- No. 8/57486 Staff-Sergeant Arthur Albert Wenborn, Royal Army Service Corps.
- No. 1913661 Sergeant (acting) Horace Arthur Gordon Wheddon, Corps of Royal Engineers.
- No. W/134428 Corporal Eva Mary Wheeler, Auxiliary Territorial Service.
- No. 286013 Private Alfred White, Royal Army Ordnance Corps.
- No. 832047 Company Quartermaster-Sergeant Charles William Henry White, Corps of Royal Engineers.
- No. 7349896 Staff-Sergeant William Alfred Wicken, Royal Army Medical Corps.
- No. W/227143 Corporal (acting) Ada Florence Wiggins, Auxiliary Territorial Service.
- No. W/15778 Sergeant (acting) Cicely Margaret Wilcox, Auxiliary Territorial Service.
- No. T/172122 Company Quartermaster-Sergeant Sidney Frank Wiles, Royal Army Service Corps.
- No. 2015405 Sergeant William Hesketh Willet, Corps of Royal Engineers.
- No. 13045957 Sapper Harold Malcolm Williams, Coups of Royal Engineers.
- No. 838708 Warrant Officer Class II (acting) John Dewi Williams, Royal Army Medical Corps.
- No. 13024201 Corporal John Henry Williams, Pioneer Corps.
- No. 2934594 Company Quartermaster-Sergeant Robert Christopher Williams, Pioneer Corps.
- No. S/14757827 Corporal (acting) Frederick Albert Wilmut, Royal Army Service Corps.
- No. W/35694 Sergeant Grace Wilson, Auxiliary Territorial Service.
- No. W/38559 Corporal Mildred Wilson, Auxiliary Territorial Service.
- No. S/1589857 Corporal Michael Dean Wippell, Royal Army Service Corps.
- No. 2009031 Sergeant Cecil Arthur Frederick Wiscombe, Corps of Royal Engineers.
- No. 14273560 Warrant Officer Class II (acting) Cecil Ralph Withey, Corps of Military Police.
- No. S/6016149 Warrant Officer Class I (acting) Douglas Vernon Wittleton, Royal Army Service Corps.
- No. W/39109 Corporal Bella Christie Wood, Auxiliary Territorial Service.
- No. T/10685564 Driver John Frederick Wood, Royal Army Service Corps.
- No. 2337685 Corporal (acting) David Woodley, Royal Corps of Signals.
- No. W/187401 Corporal Sophie Worsfold, Auxiliary Territorial Service.
- No. 824233 Battery Quartermaster-Sergeant Thomas John Wright, Royal Regiment of Artillery.
- No. W/8363 Sergeant Margaret McArthur Wyper, Auxiliary Territorial Service.
- No. 3253500 Lance-Corporal John Yates, The Cameronians (Scottish Rifles).
- No. 1068166 Staff-Sergeant James Stewart Young, Royal Regiment of Artillery.

Royal Air Force

- 564073 Flight Sergeant Arthur Eric William Austen.
- 914878 Flight Sergeant Norman John Batchelor, RAFVR.
- 1151377 Flight Sergeant Robert Sidney George Bees, RAFVR.
- 514410 Flight Sergeant Henry Gilbert Bennetts.
- 921779 Flight Sergeant Reginald Arthur Gamble, RAFVR.
- 519494 Flight Sergeant Gilbert George Chalmers Clark.
- 566699 Flight Sergeant Ernest Ainsley Close.
- 519194 Flight Sergeant Frank Leslie Coldron.
- 1064676 Flight Sergeant Joseph Arthur Coward, RAFVR.
- 1172663 Flight Sergeant Arthur Reginald Valentine Dash, RAFVR.
- 591529 Flight Sergeant Douglas Edward.
- 233354 Flight Sergeant Norman McKay Fairgreive.
- 513799 Flight Sergeant Harold Joseph Freestone.
- 1180630 Flight Sergeant Herbert Stanley Edward Gale, RAFVR.
- 813411 Flight Sergeant James Gilmour, AAF.
- 911068 Flight Sergeant Jack Harding, RAFVR.
- 531747 Flight Sergeant Edward Jarrett.
- 335352 Flight Sergeant Arthur George John.
- 1506972 Flight Sergeant Peter McBride, RAFVR.
- 364137 Flight Sergeant George William May.
- 1172239 Flight Sergeant Cyril Henry Peacock, RAFVR.
- 540086 Flight Sergeant Leonard Joseph Pursey.
- 567817 Flight Sergeant Charles Ivens Richards.
- 513476 Flight Sergeant John Smith Robertson.
- 702646 Flight Sergeant Eric Senior, RAFVR.
- 567072 Flight Sergeant George Willmott Stephenson.
- 572261 Flight Sergeant John Kenneth Walker.
- 942934 Flight Sergeant James Walsh, RAFVR.
- 568872 Flight Sergeant Leslie Wood.
- 1394582 Acting Flight Sergeant Jack Arnold, RAFVR.
- 1551202 Acting Flight Sergeant John Butchart, RAFVR.
- 568716 Acting Flight Sergeant Robert Clacher.
- 357461 Acting Flight Sergeant Harry Raymond Davies.
- 632907 Acting Flight Sergeant Stanley Clifford Drewe.
- 638551 Acting Flight Sergeant Norman Sidney Dyson.
- 932420 Acting Flight Sergeant William John Hicks, RAFVR.
- 1304890 Acting Flight Sergeant Herbert Kern, RAFVR.
- 1173435 Acting Flight Sergeant James Stanley Moodey, RAFVR.
- 591403 Acting Flight Sergeant Norman Edgar Notley.
- 625939 Acting Flight Sergeant Cecil James Payne.
- 1105406 Acting Flight Sergeant James Reginald Rimmer, RAFVR.
- 905549 Acting Flight Sergeant Richard Henry Smith, RAFVR.
- 901974 Acting Flight Sergeant Edward Alexander Snodin, RAFVR.
- 529584 Acting Flight Sergeant Charles Frederick Thomson.
- 574985 Acting Flight Sergeant Eric Trevor Willson.
- 977321 Sergeant Robert Parker Allen, RAFVR.
- 1491792 Sergeant James George Atterbury, RAFVR.
- 1008572 Sergeant Joseph Beesley, RAFVR.
- Ind.191 Sergeant Rharbanda Jai Chandra, RIAF.
- 1105631 Sergeant Leslie Charles Cheetham, RAFVR.
- 990549 Sergeant Ernest William Cooke, RAFVR.
- 641491 Sergeant Gordon Ralph Courtnadge.
- 1569703 Sergeant James Blyth Dow, RAFVR.
- 801387 Sergeant William Frank Dowie, AAF.
- 641974 Sergeant Jabez William Dowse.
- 744806 Sergeant Horace Yearley Gregory, RAFVR.
- 566513 Sergeant Peter Graham Hann.
- 533292 Sergeant Harry Hodgson.
- 1013117 Sergeant Richard Jeavons, RAFVR.
- 1867416 Sergeant Leslie Frank Johnson, RAFVR.
- 646516 Sergeant Harry Jones.
- 652943 Sergeant Francis Charles King.
- 591635 Sergeant Joseph Suthren King.
- 1246992 Sergeant Royston Cecil Long, RAFVR.
- 1038092 Sergeant William Henry Medley, RAFVR.
- 1626425 Sergeant Peter Douglas Norwood, RAFVR.
- 845380 Sergeant Frederick Charles Perry, AAF.
- 1868698 Sergeant Gordon Redvers Pipkin, RAFVR.
- 900139 Sergeant William John Powell, RAFVR.
- 1223585 Sergeant Edwin Kenneth Randall, RAFVR.
- 1012997 Sergeant Stanley Eric Reed, RAFVR.
- 510429 Sergeant Denis Arthur Roast.
- 1173511 Sergeant Harold William Rogers, RAFVR.
- 1204922 Sergeant Leslie Henry Thomas Rowe, RAFVR.
- 513987 Sergeant Clifford Walter Rushmore.
- 547875 Sergeant Maurice Edward Sanford.
- 1113443 Sergeant David Scobie, RAFVR.
- 996895 Sergeant Gordon Templeman Smith, RAFVR.
- 950627 Sergeant George John Taylor, RAFVR.
- 927838 Sergeant David Brynmore Thomas, RAFVR.
- 953908 Sergeant Cyril William Truefitt, RAFVR.
- 610649 Sergeant Lloyd Howard Turner.
- 1483393 Sergeant Jack Charles Vaughan, RAFVR.
- 575835 Sergeant William George Henry White.
- 1868764 Sergeant Edward Stanley Whitworth, RAFVR.
- 1008477 Sergeant Thomas Williamson, RAFVR.
- 365468 Sergeant Reginald William Wills.
- P.70425V Air Sergeant James George Scott, SAAF
- 2249051 Acting Sergeant Kenneth Ewins Butler, RAFVR.
- Can/R.112639 Acting Sergeant Archibald Leslie McIntosh, RCAF.
- 1161151 Acting Sergeant Howard Masson, RAFVR.
- 1494203 Corporal Gilbert Atack, RAFVR.
- 1410223 Corporal Ernest Edward Buckle, RAFVR.
- 978742 Corporal Robert William Milne Chalmers, RAFVR.
- 932510 Corporal William Chaplain, RAFVR.
- 1425740 Corporal Ernest John Cooper, RAFVR.
- 508508 Corporal William Frederick Cottrell.
- 1880461 Corporal Norman Denby Drake, RAFVR.
- 1067092 Corporal Richard Lloyd Evans, RAFVR.
- 1440073 Corporal Joseph Leslie Flint, RAFVR.
- 1023168 Corporal Kenneth Christopher Gomm, RAFVR.
- 955361 Corporal Norman Hall, RAFVR.
- 1400325 Corporal Raymond Charles Harding, RAFVR.
- 1019205 Corporal Kenneth James Harvey, RAFVR.
- 1017556 Corporal George Ibbetson, RAFVR.
- 1681012 Corporal Robert John Irving, RAFVR.
- 1293526 Corporal Leonard Edward Johnson, RAFVR.
- 1334214 Corporal Henry James Merrylees, RAFVR.
- 1300504 Corporal Richard Nicholson, GM, RAFVR.
- 1248070 Corporal Geoffrey George Rushin, RAFVR.
- 1289565 Corporal Eric Stanley Walker, RAFVR.
- 1134812 Corporal Thomas Wharton, RAFVR.
- 1473262 Corporal Frederick James John Wood, RAFVR.
- 1165377 Acting Corporal Albert George Borrett, RAFVR.
- 1688905 Leading Aircraftman Alexander Allison Brann, RAFVR.
- 1687289 Leading Aircraftman George Wilfred Dale, RAFVR.
- 1032477 Leading Aircraftman Robert Eastwood, RAFVR.
- 1633240 Leading Aircraftman Ernest Albert Gale, RAFVR.
- 1295266 Leading Aircraftman Ronald Arthur Russell Mills, RAFVR.
- 1517464 Leading Aircraftman Arthur Summers, RAFVR.
- 1689631 Leading Aircraftman Harry Tattersfield, RAFVR.
- 1134317 Leading Aircraftman Ronald James Wilcock, RAFVR.
- 882384 Flight Sergeant Vivian Mary Gregory, WAAF.
- 421039 Flight Sergeant Thelma Howard, WAAF.
- 443587 Flight Sergeant Kathleen Muriel Quinn, WAAF.
- Acting Senior Sergeant Margaret Wallis Sworder, Southern Rhodesian WAAF.
- 2021832 Sergeant Jessie Hilda Abbott, WAAF.
- 884051 Sergeant Agnes Harvey Cuthill, WAAF.
- 894895 Sergeant Helen Robertson Gerrard, WAAF.
- 2085268 Sergeant Gladys Audrey Horrocks, WAAF.
- 895532 Sergeant Gladys Emily Stone, WAAF.
- 457594 Corporal Ivy Auburn, WAAF.
- 463695 Corporal Kathleen Grace Barrington, WAAF.
- 208511 Corporal Rhoda Hesketh, WAAF.
- 2092423 Corporal Ann Winter Jones, WAAF.
- 2034890 Corporal Mabel Lemar, WAAF.
- 430736 Corporal Veronica Norah Loftus, WAAF.
- 466920 Corporal Mary Hannah Monteith, WAAF.
- 423127 Corporal Constance Norma Nelson, WAAF.
- 2048356 Corporal Constance Frances Sadler, WAAF.
- 2064459 Corporal Ena Pamela Vorley, WAAF.
- 2049142 Corporal Vera Wilkinson, WAAF.
- 464906 Acting Corporal Eva Margaret Leaver, WAAF.
- 2134100 Acting Corporal Sybil Aline Garrood Speed, WAAF.
- 2003475 Leading Aircraftwoman Victoria Miriam Brereton, WAAF.
- 461348 Leading Aircraftwoman Marion Margaret Mclaren, WAAF.
- W.588643 Nursing Member Elizabeth Gertrude Eustace-Duckett, VAD.

Civil Division

Dominions

- Edith Airlie Cousin. For services to the South Australian Hospital Visiting Committee.
- Emily Irene Moloney, Chairman, Women's Committee, Terowie Soldiers' Tea Room, South Australia.
- Bernice Tlalane Mohapeloa, President of the Home Makers' Club, Basutoland.
- Chief Matlere Lerotholi, Representative of the Paramount Chief in the Mokhotlong Ward, Basutoland.
- Yotam Phiri, Orderly, Salisbury Hospital, Southern Rhodesia.

India

- Achhru Singh, Temporary Superintendent, Adjutant-General's Branch, General Headquarters, India.
- Adi Jehanzia Ardeshir, Outside Chargeman, British India Engineering Works.
- Christian Daniel Airan, Assistant Works Manager, Ammunition Factory, Kirkee.
- William Henry Anderson, Boilermaker Foreman, Loco & Carriage Department, Bombay, Baroda and Central India Railway, Ajmer.
- Apak Jamo, Head Interpreter of Tigra, Siang Valley, Assam.
- Babu Amiya Nath Sen, Additional Jailer, Dum Dum Central Jail, 24-Parganas, Bengal.
- Babu Benoy Bhusan De, Forest Ranger, Kurseong Division, Darjeeling District, Bengal.
- Harry Cyril Baines, Travelling Senior Sanitary Inspector, Great Indian Peninsula Railway, Jhansi.
- Bongwang, Wang of Namsang, Assam.
- Justin Moses Broadway, lately Extra Assistant Recruiting Officer, Azamgarh, United Provinces.
- Choyo Cheba, Mishmi Political Jemadar, Manyutyong, Lohit Valley, Assam.
- Edward Albert Connolly, Foreman, Chief Inspectorate of Ammunition, Kirkee.
- Lionel Archibald D'CosTa, First Head Assistant, Home (Defence) Department, Government of Bengal.
- Eva Beatrice De Monte, Personal Stenographer to the Honble. the Finance Member, Government of India.
- Devan Venkata Reddi, Foreman, Inspectorate of Metal & Steel, Ishapore.
- Albert Edwin Dixon, Senior Melter (now Refinery Superintendent), His Majesty's Mint, Bombay.
- Durga Mohan Gupta, Engineer, His Majesty's Mint, Lahore.
- Thelma Teresa Farnon, Grade "A" Clerk, General Staff Branch, General Headquarters, India.
- Lawrence Rais Fernandez, Mechanical Engineer, Cooper Allen & Company, Cawnpore.
- Frederick Oliver Gilmore, Tool Room Foreman, Khargpur Workshops, Bengal Nagpur Railway.
- Sidney Victor Goodwin, Assistant Works Manager, Gun Carriage Factory, Jubbulpore.
- Hirajee Dinshaw Nargolwala, Aviation Sub-Divisional Officer, Sambre.
- Joseph George Huggins, Sergeant-Major, Armed Reserved Police, Ellore, West Godavari District, Madras.
- Hussein Ibrahim Shaikh, Range Forest Officer, Barhe, Nasik District, Bombay.
- Kelvin Joseph, Mamlatdar, Rahuri, Ahmednagar District, Bombay.
- Olattapuram Thio Joseph, Chief Foreman, Cables & Lines, Madras Telephone District, Madras.
- Alexander Granville Jones, Engineer, His Majesty's Mint, Calcutta.
- Thomas Edward Jones, Loco Foreman, North-Western Railway, Lahore.
- Kanhaiya Lal Verma, Jailor, District Jail, Meerut, United Provinces.
- Munshi Abdul Subhan Khan, Officiating Tahsildar, Sadr, Azamgarh District, United Provinces.
- Nur Mohammad Qureshi, Temporary Civilian Clerk, Grade "A", Supply Personnel Centre & Records, Royal Indian Army Service Corps.
- Louis O'Callaghan, Sergeant-Major, Madras Police, and lately Chief Warden, Air Raid Precautions, Madras.
- Arthur Norman Phillips, Engineer, His Majesty's Mint, Lahore.
- Prabhakar Sitaram Joglekar, Teacher, Aryan Education Society's High School, Girgaum, Bombay.
- Pu Hnichanga, Chief of Laki and Laikei, Laki, South Lushai Hills, Assam.
- Rao Sahib Amrut Sitaram Tendulkar, Storekeeper, Security Printing, India.
- Leslie Arthur Ridsdale, Engineer, His Majesty's Mint, Calcutta.
- Clarence Frederick Smith, Officiating Assistant Transportation Superintendent, Bengal Assam Railway, Calcutta.
- Sri Conjeevaram Rajaratna Natesa Pillai, Manager, Fisheries Branch, Department of Industries & Commerce, Madras.
- Sri Devendranath Patnaik, District Publicity Organiser, Koraput, Orissa.
- Sri Swamikannu Manickam Adeikala Muthu Pillai, Co-operative Sub-Registrar and Secretary, Trichinopoly Co-operative Wholesale Stores, Trichinopoly, Madras.
- Thakur Harbans Singh, Circle Inspector of Police, Cawnpore City, United Provinces.
- Archibald Reglan Hope Veevers, Engineer, His Majesty's Mint, Bombay.
- John Gerney Wakefield, Motor Vehicle Inspector, Gaya, Bihar.
- John Jabez Wilkinson, lately Principal Foreman, Ammunition Factory, Kirkee.

Colonial Empire

- Noel Piercy Farrar, Traffic Superintendent, Sproston's Ltd, British Guiana.
- Evadne Dorothy Lemott, Midwife, British Honduras.
- Usop Anak Mintu, Constable of Lawas, British North Borneo.
- Yita Singa, of Lawas, British North Borneo.
- Embah, Sergeant, Sarawak Ranger Constabulary, British North Borneo.
- Lawai, Chief of the village of Bareo, Central Borneo.
- Vincent Fernando Munipurage, Sub-overseer, Class 3, Department of Prisons & Probation, Ceylon.
- Salih Hassan, Sub-Inspector of Police, Cyprus.
- John Chincotta, Head Messenger and Officer Keeper, Colonial Secretariat, Gibraltar.
- Chung Tak Kwong, Imports & Exports Department, Hong Kong.
- Gian Singh, Sergeant Major, Police Department, Hong Kong.
- Iman Din, formerly Inspector, Waterworks Department, Hong Kong.
- Lau Chik Kee, Police Reserve, Hong Kong.
- John Pau, Voluntary Worker, Air Raid Precaution Service, Corps of Communications, Hong Kong.
- Tong Wo, Steward, Felix Villas Infectious Diseases Hospital, Hong Kong.
- Wong Ngai Him, Sub-Inspector, Police Department, Hong Kong.
- Wong Sik Kuen, Deputy Divisional Warden, Corps of Air Wardens, Hong Kong.
- Woo Chue, lately Member of Police Reserve, Hong Kong.
- Amani Bin Omar, Operating Theatre Attendant, European Hospital, Mombasa, Kenya.
- Agnes Macvey, Supervisor, Telephone Department, Nairobi, Kenya.
- Musyoki Mutisya, Head Leveller, Soil Conservation Service, Kenya.
- Abid Shah, Detective Police Constable, Malayan Security Service, Kuala Lumpur, Malaya.
- Mary Jane Chin, Revenue Officer, Customs & Excise Department, Malaya.
- Kumaraperumal Subra Maniam, Storekeeper, Public Works Department, Malaya.
- Raja Mohamed Ali Bin Raja Alang, Penghulu Mukim, Grade I, Negeri Sembilan, Malaya.
- Ah Soo Lee, Chief Clerk at Chinese Protectorate, Johor Bahru, Malaya.
- S. Muthian, Hospital Assistant, Balik Palace, Penang, Malaya.
- Raja Nong Bin Raja Hussin, Major Chief, Selangor, Malaya.
- Puntong Bin Lajim, Penghulu of Mukim, Jementah, Segamat, Malaya.
- Slow Cheng Joon, Superintendent, Medical Auxiliary Service, Chinese Secretariat Aid Post, Singapore.
- Ella Constance Thomas, Telephone Switchboard Operator, Headquarters, Customs & Excise Department, Kuala Lumpur, Malaya.
- Tong King Nyin, Penghulu Pulai, Malaya.
- Yeo Kim Eng, Headman and Manager, Lepers' market garden, Leper Settlement, Singapore.
- Abdullah Bin Abdul Hamid, Chief Telephone Operator, Passive Defence Department, Malaya.
- Dostrovsky, formerly Officer in Charge, Voluntary Air Raid Wardens Organisation, Haifa, Palestine.
- Jaghab, Mukhtar of Ramallah, Palestine.
- Gladstone Horatio Thomas, Foreman Platelayer, Railways, Sierra Leone.
- Al-Bundari, W.O. Class I, Arab Legion, Trans-Jordan.
- Alan Maekale, District Headman, British Solomon Islands Protectorate.
- Peter Waitusu, District Headman, British Solomon Islands Protectorate.

=== Imperial Service Medal ===
- Abdul Kader Sahib, Postman, Arasanimangalam Post Office, Chingleput District.
- Ali Haidar, Constable, Criminal Investigation Department, Patna, Bihar.
- Bhabuti Singh, Head Constable, Central Provinces and Berar.
- Vithu Shripat Bhosle, Jamadar I Grade, Headquarters, Thana District, Bombay.
- Doraisamay Pillai, Postman, Dindigul, Madura District.
- Surendra Nath Dutt, Assistant Mechanic, Calcutta West Engineering Division, Calcutta.
- Lengjang- Kuki, Head Interpreter, Kohima, Naga Hills, Assam.
- Moroba Govind Mahimkar, Fitter, Coining Department, HM Mint, Bombay.
- Miran Bux, Sub-Inspector, Telegraphs, Sind and Baluchistan Circle.
- Babaji Sultan Sahib Nijiwala, Armed II Grade Police Constable, Belgaum District, Bombay.
- Pasang, Jemadar of Orderlies, British Trade Agency, Gyantse.
- Ram Bux, Head Constable, Central Provinces and Berar.
- Shaikh Rasool Hajrat, Peon, Kolhapur Residency.
- Krishna Rama Sail, Unarmed I Grade Police Head Constable, Kanara District, Bombay.
- Sakkari Rao, Head Postman, Tanjore Head Office.
- Abajirao Ganpatrao Shinde, I Grade Police Head Constable, Poona District, Bombay.
- Surjoo Singh, Peon, Office of Garrison Engineer, Secunderabad, Deccan.
- Parasharam Bhickaji Waigankar, Chargeman, "A" Class, Great Indian Peninsula Railway.

=== Royal Red Cross (RRC) ===
Royal Navy

- Muriel Evelyn Cawston, OBE, ARRC, Acting Matron, QARNNS.
- Eva Dugdale, Civilian Matron.

Army

- Principal Matron (acting) Lilian Ethel Abel (17234), Indian Military Nursing Service.
- Principal Matron (acting) Edna Burrows (NZ.24539), Indian Military Nursing Service.
- Matron (acting) Vida Blanche Campbell (206095), QAIMNS.
- Matron (acting) Josephine Margaret Canny (206094), QAIMNS.
- Principal Matron (acting) Edith Cook (206064), QAIMNS.
- Matron (acting) Mildred Isobel Evens (213166), Territorial Army Nursing Service.
- Matron (acting) Rose Moore Hinchey (206221), QAIMNS.
- Principal, Matron (acting) Florence Holmes (206181), QAIMNS.
- Matron (acting) Elsie Florence Winifred Mabel Jolly (206245), QAIMNS.
- Matron (acting) Mary Josephine Mitchell (206075), QAIMNS(R).
- Matron Viola Cecily Daisy Spedding (206432), QAIMNS.
- Principal Matron (acting) Agnes Shaw Watson (206506), QAIMNS.
- Principal Matron (acting) Florence Violet Wheelock (257826), QAIMNS(R).
- Sister Alice Whitworth (206655), QAIMNS.

Royal Air Force

- Principal Matron Aileen Frances Acheson, ARRC, PMRAFNS (5025).
- Acting Matron Louisa Banham Cartledge, ARRC, PMRAFNS (5035).
- Acting Matron Olive Suddaby, ARRC, PMRAFNS (5026).
- Acting Matron Clementina McLachlan Youngson, ARRC, PMRAFNS (5021).

==== Bar to Royal Red Cross ====
Royal Navy

- Annabella Ralph, CBE, RRC, Matron-in-Chief (Retired), QARNNS.
- Lilian Phillips, RRC, Matron (Retired), QARNNS.

Army

- Principal Matron (acting) Ella Moore Bell, RRC (206364), QAIMNS.

==== Associate of the Royal Red Cross (ARRC) ====
Royal Navy

- Kathleen Mary Greenwood, Acting Matron, QARNNS.
- Norah Maude Willoughby, Acting Matron, QARNNS.
- Margaret McDermott, Civilian Matron.
- Elizabeth Mary Josephine Wakeham, Acting Senior Sister, QARNNS.
- Ruth Margaret Blaikie, Acting Matron, QARNNS(R).
- Kathleen Johnson Brookes, Acting Senior Sister, QARNNS(R).
- Jessie Cornelia Burkitt, Acting Senior Sister, QARNNS(R).
- Mary M'Laren Stewart, Acting Senior Sister, QARNNS(R).
- Margaret Jean Ferrier, Nursing Sister, QARNNS(R).
- Betty Smith, Nursing Sister, QARNNS(R).
- Eileen Mary Steele, Nursing Sister, QARNNS(R).
- Gertrude Evelyn Allred, VAD Commandant.
- Carena May Halahan. VAD Commandant.
- Barbara Hall, VAD Commandant.
- Irene Waistell, VAD Commandant.
- Beryl Diana Day Davies, VAD Nursing Member (Supervising).
- Enid Mary Tirmese Goodfellow, VAD Nursing Member (Supervising).
- Martha Molyneux, VAD Nursing Member (Supervising).
- Lilian Edna Leah Gane, VAD Nursing Member (Head).
- Alexandra Mavrojani, VAD Nursing Member (Head).
- May Murray, VAD Nursing Member (Head).
- Elizabeth Wake, VAD Nursing Member (Head).
- Beatrice Amy Rose Harvey, VAD Nursing Member (Senior).
- Mary Tennant, VAD Nursing Member (Senior).

Army

- Sister Grace Adoock (230743), QAIMNS(R).
- Sister Annie Maria Bradley (206662), QAIMNS(R).
- Sister Helen Patience Kathleen Brett (206051), QAIMNS.
- Sister Naomi Davies (206982), QAIMNS(R).
- Senior Sister Johanna Drennan (206112), QAIMNS.
- Sister Diana Mary Bales (291595), QAIMNS(R).
- W/696020 Private Jessie Adeline Kerr Elliot, VAD.
- Sister Helen Maxwell Fisher (208076), QAIMNS(R).
- Sister Margaret Joyce Garratt, East African Military Nursing Service.
- Sister Louisa Muir Harley (213456), Territorial Army Nursing Service.
- Senior Sister Henrietta Thistle Heselton (208408), QAIMNS(R).
- Sister Marjorie Houghton (213524), Territorial Army Nursing Service.
- Sister Kathleen Mary Jenkins (208541), QAIMNS(R).
- Matron (acting) Elizabeth Jessie Kennedy (213593), Territorial Army Nursing Service.
- Sister Florence May Lopatecki (206887), QAIMNS(R).
- Sister Muriel Joan Macleod (209617), QAIMNS(R).
- Sister Eileen Margaret Mary McComish (223213), QAIMNS(R).
- Sister Lydia McLean (208680), QAIMNS(R).
- W/615023 Warrant Officer Class I Muriel Meikle, VAD.
- Sister Irene May Morton (208862), QAIMNS(R).
- W/696010 Private Catherine Murray Mutch, VAD.
- Sister Gwerfil Parkinson (270972), QAIMNS(R).
- Sister Bertha Doris Peterson (NZ.23904), Indian Military Nursing Service.
- W/632005 Warrant Officer Class I Mary Gwendolen Phillips, VAD.
- W/786005 Private Anne Elizabeth Reynolds, VAD.
- Sister Beatrice Maud Reynolds (215344), Territorial Army Nursing Service.
- Sister Ellen Skelton (215468), Territorial Army Nursing Service.
- Nursing Cadet Estelle Mavis Stoddard (994), Army Nursing Service (India).
- W/1570122 Corporal Helen Elizabeth Tellett, VAD.
- Sister Daphne Anne Van Wart (209468), QAIMNS(R).
- Matron (acting) Elizabeth Mary Walsh (206527), QAIMNS.
- Sister Kathleen Woodman (209612), QAIMNS(R).
- Matron (acting) Ethel Yates (215879), Territorial Army Nursing Service.

Royal Air Force

- Acting Senior Sister Mildred Annie Hawkins, PMRAFNS (5158).
- Acting Senior Sister Lucy Norna Jamieson, PMRAFNS (5157).
- Acting Senior Sister Annie Nicol Prescott, PMRAFNS (5073).
- Acting Senior Sister Audrey Marguerite Steinbach, PMRAFNS (5274).
- Acting Senior Sister Gladys Toole, PMRAFNS (5056).
- Acting Senior Sister Margaret Wilson, PMRAFNS (5090).
- Sister Millicent Hudson, PMRAFNS (5365).
- Sister Grace Hannah Bowes Spence, PMRAFNS (5754).
- Sister Eva Winifred Stewart, PMRAFNS (5319).
- Sister Phyllis Mary Bettine Stokes, PMRAFNS (5478).
- Sister Edith Lucy Woodward, PMRAFNS (5447).
- VAD Nursing Member Beatrice Marie Hossack (W.630031).

=== Air Force Cross (AFC) ===
Acting Wing Commanders

- Denis Frederic Beardon (39775), RAF.
- Cyril Percy Chilvers (80053), RAFVR.
- Malcolm Kemp Sewell, DFC (40854), Reserve of Air Force Officers.
- Thomas Armstrong Shield (100504), RAFVR.

Major

- Jocelyn Grahame Strunck (9800V), South African Air Force.

Squadron Leaders

- Joseph Aloysius Hayes Cooper (40208), RAFO.
- Maurice Cuthbert Raban (33493), RAF.
- Anthony Clarabut Gude Wenman (85270), RAFVR.
- Robert Gray Joyce (Can/J.6168), Royal Canadian Air Force (with effect from 12 February 1946).
- John Terrance McCutcheon (Can/J.15174), Royal Canadian Air Force.
- Walter Jack Runciman, DFM (N.Z.403991), Royal New Zealand Air Force.

Acting Squadron Leaders

- Frank William Alder (42581), RAF.
- Gerald Frederick Reader Alford (108852), RAFVR.
- Alister Douglas Atkinson (120852), RAFVR.
- Donald Archibald Lang Campbell (27024), RAFVR.
- Denis Clive (60750), RAFVR.
- Patrick Astley Friend, DFC (66016), RAFVR.
- Ronald Thomas Hodges, DFC (103016), RAFVR.
- Dennis Watkin Jones, DFC (121308), RAFVR.
- William Laing (103036), RAFVR.
- Bernard Frederick Perkins (89830), RAFVR.
- Thomas Pryde (134763), RAFVR.
- William Godfrey Redding (43467), RAF.
- James Ritchie Ritchie (41871), RAFO.
- Michael Foxton Wynne-Willson (89625) RAFVR.
- Dominic Joseph Dewan (Can/J.16177), Royal Canadian Air Force.
- Alva Edward Henderson (N.Z.4O2026), Royal New Zealand Air Force.

Captain

- Jacobus Herculaas De La Rey (95081V), South African Air Force.

Flight Lieutenants

- Philip Charles Anscombe, DFM (49255), RAF.
- Ronald Frederick William Aylott (153135), RAFVR.
- Peter Raymond Blanshard (1573008), RAFVR.
- Robert Wallace Bowman (150292), RAFVR.
- Charles Victor Brown (128540), RAFVR.
- Gordon Ernest Camplin (116438), RAFVR.
- Sidney Harold Carder (129237), RAFVR.
- Walter William Cooke, DFM (147312), RAFVR.
- Noel Carlo Croppi (169009), RAFVR.
- Thomas Henry Dargavel, DFC (146983), RAFVR.
- Duncan Alexander Dobbie (144790), RAFVR.
- Walter Desmond Dwyer (156024), RAF.
- Harold Griffin (134524), RAFVR.
- Gerald Rockley Haggas (61263), RAFVR.
- James Nigel Hamilton (143741), RAFVR.
- John William Hawke (54274), RAF.
- Joseph Leslie Harrison Heagerty (161733), RAFVR.
- Laurence Coulson Henwood (162326), RAFVR.
- Eric Daniel Herbert (126131), RAFVR.
- Ronald Thomas Howard (177444), RAFVR.
- Stephen Robert Hughes (124683), RAFVR.
- Richard George Ivemey (43172), RAF.
- Hugh Glanffrwd James, DFM (173932), RAFVR.
- Arthur Knapper (51842), RAF.
- Jack Bernard Logan (171666), RAFVR.
- Donald James Ott Loudon (53250), RAF.
- Douglas Charles Lowe, DFC (138661), RAFVR.
- Arthur Brooke Lowndes (171220), RAFVR.
- John Corrie Martin (119202), RAFVR.
- Dudley Clare Mason (142193), RAFVR.
- John Adrian Mather (67620), RAFVR.
- Robert Harvey Miller (115391), RAFVR.
- Wilfred Charles Henry Munsch, DFC (171002), RAFVR.
- Bernard Stanley Murphy (151692), RAFVR.
- Thomas Burnley Murray (90991), AAF.
- Thomas Fremlin Paul Nisbet (89354), RAFVR.
- Phillip Ernest Prior (144760), RAFVR.
- James Henry Benjamin Richards, DFC (145120), RAFVR.
- Henry Sharples (136831), RAFVR.
- Ronald Arthur Sloan (150382), RAFVR.
- George Smee (131656), RAFVR.
- Jack Steere (47746), RAF.
- Donald Frederick Sykes (174578), RAFVR.
- Denis Tasker (146979), RAFVR.
- Arthur Noel Thomas (148697), RAFVR.
- Herbert Furnival Vyse (155253), RAFVR.
- Richard George Wheldon (39040), RAFO.
- Arthur Edgar Williams (133549), RAFVR.
- Malcolm Clow Wilson (151202), RAFVR.
- William Thomas Wright (159472), RAFVR.
- Stanley John Rane (Aus.404061), RAAF.
- Donald Harrison (Can/J.13738), RCAF.
- Hardie Emerson McNeil (Can/J.11320), RCAF.

Acting Flight Lieutenants

- Kenneth Walter Clarine, DFC (191454), RAFVR.
- Ralph William Hollis (186327), RAFVR.

Flying Officers

- James Barlow (179951), RAFVR.
- Denis Percival Clifton (198977), RAFVR.
- Vincent Aneurin Gough (181085), RAFVR.
- George Gretton (201189), RAFVR.
- Edward Charles Miller (189435), RAFVR.
- Dennis Philip Parsons (199076), RAFVR.
- Gordon Francis Quin (199775), RAFVR.
- William Douglas Seckerson (182111), RAFVR.
- William James Henry Setterfield (184649), RAFVR.
- Kenneth Archibald Thompson (56850), RAF.

Pilot Officers

- Ronald Thomas Hemming, DFC (201844), RAFVR.
- Peter Norman Morse (201427), RAFVR.

Warrant Officers

- John Hopkins Daniel (1103488), RAFVR.
- Frederick Laurence Hall-Wright (1377001), RAFVR.
- Raymond Langford High (1381394), RAFVR.
- Terry John Hobbs (1437912), RAFVR.
- John Mostyn Gower Jones (1312493), RAFVR.
- Ralph Deacon Marshall (1212373), RAFVR.
- Ronald Hugh Wallace Simpson (1390605), RAFVR.
- Wladuslaw Szulczewski (Can/R.783698), RCAF.
- Paul Derek Skelt (N.Z.4211669), RNZAF.

==== Bar to Air Force Cross ====
- Wing Commander John Duncan Harcourt Slade, AFC (27166), RAF.

=== Air Force Medal (AFM) ===
Flight Sergeants

- 1600779 Charles Macey, RAFVR.
- 2249694 John Edward Ogden, RAFVR.
- 1486966 Cyril Eleson Simpson, RAFVR.

Sergeants

- 1626188 Edward Dawson, RAFVR.
- 1262884 Bertram Eric Woodin, RAFVR.

=== King's Commendations for Valuable Service in the Air ===
Royal Air Force

- Wing Commander G. V. Fryer, AFC (37094).
- Squadron Leader F. J. Kennedy (41428), RAFO.
- Squadron Leader J. H. Saffery, DSO (61457), RAFVR.
- Acting Squadron Leader H. F. Bucknell, AFC (43248).
- Acting Squadron Leader W. T. Howell-Jones (136026), RAFVR.
- Acting Squadron Leader S. J. Mansell, AFC (44596).
- Acting Squadron Leader E. A. Morris (139149). RAFVR.
- Acting Squadron Leader K. G. Pearce (79963), RAFVR.
- Acting Squadron Leader D. L. R. Smith (82175), RAFVR.
- Flight Lieutenant W. S. Bateson (153085), RAFVR.
- Flight Lieutenant T. Bell, DFC (146400), RAFVR.
- Flight Lieutenant P. Berriman (119950), RAFVR.
- Flight Lieutenant D. S. Bielby, DFC (171054), RAFVR.
- Flight Lieutenant N. F. Bomford (129076), RAFVR.
- Flight Lieutenant S. G. Burrows (136197), RAFVR.
- Flight Lieutenant E. Cheek, DFM (54132).
- Flight Lieutenant R. L. S. Coulson (47288).
- Flight Lieutenant C. J. Edwards (152799) RAFVR.
- Flight Lieutenant H. Gibson (134196), RAFVR.
- Flight Lieutenant H. J. Griffiths (130188), RAFVR.
- Flight Lieutenant J. L. Gullen (187352), RAFVR.
- Flight Lieutenant A. L. Gwynn (100578), RAFVR.
- Flight Lieutenant A. D. Hindmarsh (150305), RAFVR.
- Flight Lieutenant A. B. Jones, AFC (43173).
- Flight Lieutenant R. J. Jones (171677), RAFVR.
- Flight Lieutenant R. W. Knowles (126103), RAFVR.
- Flight Lieutenant R. Leach (137928), RAFVR.
- Flight Lieutenant J. D. Leveridge (137249), RAFVR.
- Flight Lieutenant B. Lilofsky (176011), RAFVR.
- Flight Lieutenant D. H. Mackie (171575), RAFVR.
- Flight Lieutenant W. J. Martin, DFC (66574), RAFVR.
- Flight Lieutenant R. P. Merritt (151203), RAFVR.
- Flight Lieutenant S. T. Morrell (151907), RAFVR.
- Flight Lieutenant E. J. K. Penikett (102957), RAFVR.
- Flight Lieutenant K. R. Penry (143870), RAFVR.
- Flight Lieutenant G. H. Phillips (161055), RAFVR.
- Flight Lieutenant B. E. Roberts (52308).
- Flight Lieutenant S. R. Roberts (123459), RAFVR.
- Flight Lieutenant P. A. Rowell (115449), RAFVR.
- Flight Lieutenant R. A. Russell (115941). RAFVR.
- Flight Lieutenant R. B. H. Scroggs (130387), RAFVR.
- Flight Lieutenant E. L. Spridgeon (127227), RAFVR.
- Flight Lieutenant L. Swabey (111475), RAFVR.
- Flight Lieutenant P. E. H. Thomas (60297), RAFVR.
- Flight Lieutenant D. R. Thompson, DFC (148905), RAFVR.
- Flight Lieutenant R. G. Wakeford (133508).
- Flight Lieutenant R. J. White (177406), RAFVR.
- Flight Lieutenant A. C. Woolford (136925), RAFVR.
- Flight Lieutenant N. H. Wright (174292), RAFVR.
- Flight Lieutenant K. E. Young (48729).
- Acting Flight Lieutenant D. Davies (124373), RAFVR.
- Acting Flight Lieutenant J. H. Milne (140996), RAFVR.
- Acting Flight Lieutenant H. Senior (125492), RAFVR.
- Flying Officer D. J. C. Barr (175384), RAFVR.
- Flying Officer J. R. Conn (195021), RAFVR.
- Flying Officer P. F. Foucard (189444), RAFVR.
- Flying Officer W. P. R. Foy (187941), RAFVR.
- Flying Officer L. F. Hart (198156), RAFVR.
- Flying Officer G. W. Hunt (55812).
- Flying Officer J. G. S. McHutchen (201443), RAFVR.
- Flying Officer M. A. C. Mayes (198131), RAFVR.
- Flying Officer E. W. Stephens (199542), RAFVR.
- Flying Officer J. R. Wightman (165468), RAFVR.
- Warrant Officer W. N. Baggaley (1583519), RAFVR.
- Warrant Officer W. Black (1065089), RAFVR.
- Warrant Officer J. B. Chadwick (1490382), RAFVR.
- Warrant Officer R. L. Duckett (1338734), RAFVR.
- Warrant Officer A. Gaskin (575962).
- Warrant Officer T. Garcia-Scott (945559), RAFVR.
- Warrant Officer E. A. Kempton (1331573), RAFVR.
- Warrant Officer F. H. Tanfield (364311).
- Warrant Officer H. W. Tindale (1679251), RAFVR.
- Warrant Officer R. Witton (937385), RAFVR.
- Flight Sergeant 1892827 C. H. Bullivant, RAFVR.
- Flight Sergeant 1686292 C. E. W. Porritt, RAFVR.
- Flight Sergeant 1875800 N. H. Salter, RAFVR.
- Flight Sergeant 1820505 R. J. A. Shepherd, RAFVR.

Royal Australian Air Force

- Flying Officer C. A. White (Aus.424517).

Royal Canadian Air Force

- Flight Lieutenant D. R. B. Anderson (Can/C.27052)
- Flight Lieutenant J. H. Bradstock (Can/J.24612).
- Flight Lieutenant R. C. Hilton (Can/J.21061)
- Flight Lieutenant D. K. Horner (Can/J.220622)
- Flight Lieutenant L. C. Larter (Can/J.10806)
- Acting Flight Lieutenant N. J. E. Tarry (Can/J.13587).
- Flying Officer J. C. Mclaughlin (Can/J.403308).

=== King's Commendations for Brave Conduct ===
Royal Air Force

- Acting Wing Commander R. D. Williams (39182).
- 564690 Flight Sergeant B. W. Hobley.
- 945435 Sergeant S. J. Turner, RAFVR.
- 1655567 Corporal S. H. H. Blackford, RAFVR.
- 1162073 Leading Aircraftman H. W. V. Blowers, RAFVR.

Royal Canadian Air Force

- Flight Lieutenant G. W. Larocque (Can/C.6204).

=== Mentioned in Despatches ===
==== Royal Navy ====
- Acting Lieutenant Commander Samuel George Potts.
- Acting Lieutenant Commander Wilfred Louis Gerard Dutton, RNR.
- Acting Lieutenant Commander Frank Seymour Tolliday, RNR.
- Temporary Acting Lieutenant Commander Harry Richard Kemble, RNVR.
- Temporary Acting Lieutenant Commander Edward Hugh McCormack, RNVR.
- Temporary Acting Lieutenant Commander John Cyril James Poynton, RNVR.
- Temporary Acting Lieutenant Commander Henry Nugent Somerville, RNVR.
- Temporary Acting Lieutenant Commander Stuart Latham Stammwitz, RNVR.
- Lieutenant Frank Mogg.
- Lieutenant John Kenneth Smithells.
- Temporary Lieutenant Trevor Lloyd Jones, RNR.
- Temporary Lieutenant Peter Brown, RNVR.
- Temporary Lieutenant Bernard Edward Colechin, RNVR.
- Temporary Lieutenant Alexander Fraser, RNVR.
- Temporary Lieutenant Geoffrey Frederick Furze, RNVR.
- Temporary Lieutenant Robert Shield Goodale, RNVR.
- Temporary Lieutenant John Lowery Hacker, RNVR.
- Temporary Lieutenant Ronald George Healey, RNVR.
- Temporary Lieutenant John Edward Hickford, DSC, RNVR.
- Temporary Lieutenant Walter Mottram Kilshaw, RNVR.
- Temporary Lieutenant John Frederick Middleton, RNVR.
- Temporary Lieutenant Cecil Gerald Pilbeam, RNVR.
- Temporary Lieutenant Roger Maxwell Strachan, RNVR.
- Temporary Lieutenant John Thomas Wardle, RNVR.
- Temporary Lieutenant Peter George Wright, RNVR.
- Temporary Lieutenant Alec James Wyatt, RNVR.
- Temporary Acting Lieutenant Thomas Archibald Gray, MBE, RNVR.
- Temporary Lieutenant Gordon Grainger Wyllie, South African Naval Forces (Voluntary).
- Temporary Sub-Lieutenant Vincent Raubenheimer Le Roux, South African Naval Forces (Voluntary).
- Temporary Sub-Lieutenant Archibald Aimers, RNVR.
- Temporary Sub-Lieutenant Derrick Lawrence Russell, RNVR.
- Temporary Sub-Lieutenant Dennis Alban Tarrant, RNVR.
- Temporary Electrical Lieutenant William Bennie, RNVR.
- Temporary Electrical Sub-Lieutenant Edward Francis Peter Bigwood, RNVR.
- Temporary Lieutenant (S) George Langridge, RNVR.
- Temporary Lieutenant (S) Frank Carr Smith, RNVR.
- Mr. Norman Randolph Danby, Temporary Warrant Mechanician.
- Chief Petty Officer Michael Allen, D/JX.130564.
- Chief Petty Officer John Samuel Cleveland, LT/JX.222785.
- Acting Chief Petty Officer George Hugh Easman, D/JX.134138.
- Chief Engineer Walter Bowie, L/K.148430.
- Engineroom Artificer 1st Class William Hutchinson, P/MX.77260.
- Engineroom Artificer 3rd Class Leslie Bristow, C/MX.53246.
- Engineroom Artificer 3rd Class Cedric Dennerly, C/MX.76521.
- Engineroom Artificer 3rd Class William Smith Duncan, D/MX.56292.
- Engineroom Artificer 3rd Class Robert Phillip Joiner, C/MX.55782.
- Engineroom Artificer 3rd Class Cameron Charles Mcdonald, C/MX.56223.
- Engineroom Artificer 3rd Class Alan John Nicholas, P/MX.78221.
- Engineroom Artificer 3rd Class Leonard Walter Tredget, C/MX.77862.
- Engineroom Artificer 3rd Class Thomas Paskell Williams, P/MX.63079.
- Chief Stoker Frederick Charles Gillett, P/KX.75311.
- Chief Stoker Albert Victor Gower, C/K.66666.
- Chief Stoker Wilfred Rhodes Rockley, D/KX.79020.
- Chief Stoker James Soulsby Williamson, P/K.67055.
- Chief Stoker (Temporary) Kendall Douglas Snelling, C/KX.89016.
- Acting Chief Engineman Robert Smith Humphrey, LT/KX.121310.
- Acting Chief Engineman Roderick MacDonald, LT/KX.147868.
- Petty Officer Sydney Thomas Hugh Blake, LT/JX.281448.
- Second Hand Joseph Ernest Calver, LT/JX, 242661.
- Petty Officer John Richard Darby, D/JX.139835.
- Petty Officer Frank Alfred Edward Hines, P/JX.151977.
- Petty Officer Jack Holpin, D/J.110027.
- Petty Officer William Albert Seatherton, D/JX.143897.
- Petty Officer Peter Sked, P/JX.141669.
- Petty Officer (Temporary) Alfred Charles Bedford, C/JX.146125.
- Acting Petty Officer Gavin Dunipace Brownlie, P/JX.141574.
- Acting Petty Officer Henry Charles Dyble, L/X.19317A.
- Temporary Petty Officer Samuel Hall, P/SSX.30489.
- Petty Officer Motor Mechanic John Albert Boscott, P/MX. 126121.
- Petty Officer Motor Mechanic John William George Brill, C/MX.118575.
- Petty Officer Motor Mechanic Colin Harding, P/MX.125125.
- Petty Officer Motor Mechanic Ashley Edward Morphy, P/MX.117308.
- Petty Officer Engineman John Elliott Davison, LT/KX.152316.
- Petty Officer Engineman Leslie Arthur Hartford, LT/KX.125192.
- Petty Officer Engineman Raymond Hawthorne, LT/KX.153291.
- Petty Officer Engineman John Fergus Steel, LT/KX.132776.
- Petty Officer Wireman Douglas William Sharp, P/MX.70787.
- Yeoman of Signals Henry Richard Moon, C/JX.129262.
- Yeoman of Signals (Temporary) Cyril John Mortimore, D/JX.143468.
- Engineroom Artificer 4th Class Clifford William Alfred Lea, P/MX.124530.
- Stoker Petty Officer (Temporary) Samuel James Beards, D/KX.76551.
- Stoker Petty Officer (Temporary) James Alfred Felgate, C/KX.96544.
- Stoker Petty Officer (Temporary) Thomas Frederick Owen, C/KX.91513.
- Stoker Petty Officer (Temporary) Frank Hoigate Payne, C/KX.92186.
- Acting Stoker Petty Officer (Temporary) Wyndham Williams, P/KX.104675.
- Stores Petty Officer Cyril Harry Hall, P/MX.94477.
- Stores Petty Officer John Gilbert Smart, C/MX.84329.
- Leading Seaman John Gilbert Hall, LT/JX.287775.
- Leading Seaman George William Jackson, DSM, BEM, P/JX.131385.
- Leading Seaman Ronald Knight, D/JX.306191.
- Leading Seaman Clifford Robinson, C/SSX.28956.
- Leading Seaman Edward Threlfall, LT/JX.304066.
- Acting Leading Seaman Lionel Richard Buckle, P/JX.325942.
- Temporary Acting Leading Seaman George William Joseph Hilling, C/SSX.24283.
- Leading Wireman Stanley James Shephard, C/MX.77493.
- Leading Wireman George Raymond Troughton, C/MX.97628.
- Leading Signalman (Temporary) Henry George Arthur Hine, C/SSX.31467.
- Leading Signalman (Temporary) Jack Woodward, P/JX.328375.
- Leading Telegraphist William Dobson, D/JX.341396.
- Acting Leading Stoker (Temporary) Albert John Robert Boyt, C/KX.9O120.
- Leading Stores Assistant Ernest John Wesley Dickens, D/MX.675880.
- Leading Cook (S) Norman Barraclough, D/MX.100798.
- Able Seaman John Frederick Cooper, P/JX.629138.
- Able Seaman Patrick Cox, D/JX.5582O3.
- Able Seaman Frederick William Evans, D/JX.296642.
- Able Seaman Rudolph George Terence Hallet, D/JX.565802.
- Able Seaman John Henry Martin, DSM, BEM, P/JX.147610.
- Able Seaman Arthur McCourt, GM, P/SSX.29101.
- Seaman Albert Edward Beaumont, LT/JX.380944.
- Seaman Denzil Blanchard, LT/JX. 3557Oq.
- Seaman Henry Channon, LT/JX.32661.
- Seaman Thomas Stephen Clayton, LT/JX.543693.
- Seaman Daniel Sinclair Dunnett, LT/JX.211074.
- Seaman Victor James Higgins, LT/JX.382603.
- Seaman Kenneth Thirkell, LT/JX.300772.
- Seaman Christopher Harvey Thomas, LT/JX.281554.
- Signalman Thomas Denwood, L/JX. 192774.
- Signalman Malcolm Johnson, LT/JX.717390.
- Signalman Cyril Knight, P/JX.426261.
- Signalman Eric Edward Thomas Reeves, P/JX.330138.
- Telegraphist Walter Gregory, D/JX.215169.
- Telegraphist Ralph Roe, LT/JX.427418.
- Stoker 1st Class Andrew Jack, LT/KX.599394.
- Stoker 1st Class Ernest Arthur Vigar, P/KX.601205.
- Steward Frederick Walter Langdown, P/LX.578786.

==== Royal Air Force ====
- Group Captain H. S. L. Dundas, DSO, DFC, AAF.
- Acting Group Captain K. J. Rampling, DSO, DFC (deceased).
- Acting Group Captain W. G. Wells, DSO.
- Wing Commander T. D. Calnan (33228).
- Wing Commander G. B. Keily, DFC, AFC (27256).
- Wing Commander N. H. J. Tindal (05225).
- Wing Commander R. R. S. Tuck, DSO, DFC (37306), RAFO.
- Acting Wing Commander R. H. Barnes (127552), RAFVR.
- Acting Wing Commander J. A. Boulton (118224), RAFVR.
- Acting Wing Commander A. D. Jackson (73246).
- Acting Wing Commander J. A. Lee-Evans, DFC (63074), RAFVR.
- Squadron Leader R. J. Bushell (90120), AAF (deceased).
- Squadron Leader C. N. S. Campbell, DFC (44879).
- Squadron Leader C. A. R. Crews (37795), RAFO.
- Squadron Leader C. J. Gover (149923), RAFVR.
- Squadron Leader E. C. S. Fewtrell, DFC (37673), RAFO.
- Squadron Leader K. Jones, DFC (40714), RAFO.
- Squadron Leader D. J. Kilgallin (103829), RAFVR.
- Squadron Leader H. W. Lamond (36174), RAFO.
- Squadron Leader E. D. G. Lewis (131201), RAFVR.
- Squadron Leader J. P. Michell (39552).
- Squadron Leader B. G. Morris (34167).
- Squadron Leader D. E. Pinchbeck, DFC (70902), RAFO.
- Acting Squadron Leader W. G. T. Hughes (50937).
- Acting Squadron Leader H. I. Matthey (106226), RAFVR.
- Acting Squadron Leader A. O'Malley (133849), RAFVR.
- Acting Squadron Leader E. G. Pannell (86680), RAFVR.
- Acting Squadron Leader T. W. Piper, AFC (37913), RAFO.
- Acting Squadron Leader N. Riley (173205), RAFVR.
- Acting Squadron Leader H. Schofield (155730), RAFVR.
- Acting Squadron Leader C. Wright (66112), RAFVR.
- Flight Lieutenant C. D. Aidney, DFC (157690), RAFVR.
- Flight Lieutenant J. N. P. Arkle (124908), RAFVR.
- Flight Lieutenant A. P. L. Barber (45056).
- Flight Lieutenant A. J. Beales (101061), RAFVR.
- Flight Lieutenant R. W. E. Duke (133422), RAFVR (deceased).
- Flight Lieutenant F. W. Dunn (184324), RAFVR.
- Flight Lieutenant R. Edge (66002), RAFVR.
- Flight Lieutenant B. Everton-Jones (72397), RAFVR.
- Flight Lieutenant N. Forbes (90252), AAF.
- Flight Lieutenant L. J. E. Goldfinch (60286), RAFVR.
- Flight Lieutenant A. B. Goldie (41281), RAFO.
- Flight Lieutenant F. B. Graham (75399), RAFVR.
- Flight Lieutenant T. F. Guest (42985).
- Flight Lieutenant R. Halliday (169958), RAFVR.
- Flight Lieutenant G. Hill (61046), RAFVR.
- Flight Lieutenant W. H. Holland (86664), RAFVR.
- Flight Lieutenant F. Hugill (43422).
- Flight Lieutenant A.E. Johnson (61984), RAFVR (deceased).
- Flight Lieutenant G. Leeson (90250), RAFVR.
- Flight Lieutenant I. A. McIntosh (40631), RAFO.
- Flight Lieutenant S. C. Matthews, DFC (142217), RAFVR.
- Flight Lieutenant B. A. Mitchell (39107).
- Flight Lieutenant L. R. Moore (153010), RAFVR.
- Flight Lieutenant I. M. Muir (42255), RAFO.
- Flight Lieutenant H. D. Newman (36271), RAFO.
- Flight Lieutenant A. D. Panton, DFC (33331).
- Flight Lieutenant V. Parker (42356), RAFO (deceased).
- Flight Lieutenant H. E. Parratt, DFM (143915), RAFVR.
- Flight Lieutenant D. L. Plunkett (78847), RAFVR.
- Flight Lieutenant J. H. C. Rowe (90089), AAF.
- Flight Lieutenant D. H. Spencer (134580), RAFVR.
- Flight Lieutenant H. R. Stockings, DFC (79173), RAFVR.
- Flight Lieutenant T. H. Taylor (104505), RAFVR.
- Flight Lieutenant J. B. Wilson (101509), RAFVR.
- Honorary Flight Lieutenant J. C. S. Agazarian (71106), RAFO (deceased).
- Acting Flight Lieutenant R. P. Cummins (50565).
- Acting Flight Lieutenant Leonard Arthur French (144954), RAFVR (deceased).
- Acting Flight Lieutenant J. H. Miller (169752), RAFVR.
- Acting Flight Lieutenant S. Moorhouse (130003), RAFVR.
- Acting Flight Lieutenant W. Oswell (189550), RAFVR.
- Acting Flight Lieutenant R. A. Walker, DFC (149550), RAFVR.
- Acting Flight Lieutenant J. W. Whittaker (105989), RAFVR.
- Flying Officer H. W. Ashley (177139), RAFVR.
- Flying Officer R. N. Dore (134833), RAFVR.
- Flying Officer H. Frost, DFM (169864), RAFVR.
- Flying Officer G. A. Hall (149916), RAFVR.
- Flying Officer G. Hood (178869), RAFVR.
- Flying Officer T. G. Levitt (182071), RAFVR.
- Flying Officer G. Mamoutoff (147939), RAFVR.
- Flying Officer L. Morris (135971), RAFVR.
- Flying Officer A. R. Munro (189829), RAFVR.
- Flying Officer R. Owen (182082), RAFVR.
- Flying Officer P. G. Scott-Miller (127670), RAFVR.
- Flying Officer L. N. Vaudin (106970), RAFVR.
- Flying Officer J. W. Vinall (169518), RAFVR.
- Honorary Flying Officer E. M. Wilkinson (71123), RAFO (deceased).
- Pilot Officer H. J. Carley (195101), RAFVR.
- Pilot Officer G. H. Dane (146425), RAFVR (deceased).
- Warrant Officer E. Callander, DFM (1061420), RAFVR.
- Warrant Officer E. C. Cradduck (744022), RAFVR.
- Warrant Officer R. R. Drummond (925696), RAFVR.
- Warrant Officer D. Flynn (520569).
- Warrant Officer E. W. E. Gough (755011), RAFVR.
- Warrant Officer G. P. Hickman (748272), RAFVR.
- Warrant Officer S. N. Hind (745404), RAFVR.
- Warrant Officer J. W. T. House (755460), RAFVR.
- Warrant Officer H. L. Hurrell (905095), RAFVR.
- Warrant Officer A. H. Johnson (900452), RAFVR.
- Warrant Officer A. R. Kilminster (962982), RAFVR.
- Warrant Officer W. H. Langridge (509463).
- Warrant Officer E. B. Lascelles, DFM (580224) (deceased).
- Warrant Officer E. P. Lewis (970467), RAFVR.
- Warrant Officer R. A. Marriott (1190134), RAFVR.
- Warrant Officer R. B. Olliver (964794), RAFVR.
- Warrant Officer R. B. H. Townsend-Coles (625503).
- Warrant Officer A. R. G. Warne (1581363), RAFVR.
- Warrant Officer F. Webster (997227), RAFVR.
- Warrant Officer A. S. Winton (995694), RAFVR.
- Acting Warrant Officer F. J. Deverson (363926).
- Acting Warrant Officer G. C. Rowland (591178).
- Acting Warrant Officer H. Whitney (1170592), RAFVR.
- 942001 Flight Sergeant C. H. Day, RAFVR.
- 564724 Flight Sergeant F. S. Harrison.
- 1400819 Flight Sergeant K. H. C. Ingram, RAFVR.
- 3050454 Flight Sergeant G. R. Johnson, RAFVR.
- 1263001 Flight Sergeant E. A. Percival, RAFVR.
- 1301840 Acting Flight Sergeant A. L. J. Hutchinson, RAFVR.
- 1607992 Sergeant A. Banks, RAFVR.
- 525684 Sergeant G. L. J. Cowing.
- 511323 Sergeant M. W. Cubbin.
- 1003978 Sergeant J. Davidson, RAFVR.
- 817056 Sergeant W. G. Geddes, AAF.
- 569901 Sergeant R. E. Goodread.
- 1478162 Sergeant L. Gray, RAFVR.
- 1475498 Sergeant E. R. T. Jowett, RAFVR.
- 621912 Sergeant G. M. Milnes.
- 1160494 Sergeant J. E. R. Rambridge, RAFVR.
- 570725 Sergeant L. H. Rich.
- 1324224 Sergeant P. S. C. Thorne, RAFVR.
- 1272882 Sergeant F. P. Warwick, RAFVR.
- 1088519 Acting Sergeant C. W. Chapman, RAFVR.
- 1271393 Acting Sergeant T. W. Milliner, RAFVR.
- 1505703 Corporal C. W. Chapman, RAFVR.
- 1550020 Corporal J. A. Auld, RAFVR.
- 577006 Corporal J. R. Brown, RAFVR.
- 983978 Corporal F. Burton, RAFVR.
- 1373308 Corporal S. A. Cogle, RAFVR.
- 1353927 Corporal N. Heaton, RAFVR.
- 920363 Corporal L. J. Herriott, RAFVR.
- 1135652 Corporal R. J. Hunt, RAFVR.
- 1560397 Corporal T. Ingram, RAFVR.
- 1540618 Corporal K. G. Mynard, RAFVR.
- 632796 Corporal A. Owen.
- 1164536 Corporal F. A. Pinnock, RAFVR.
- 1287719 Corporal L. G. Poulter, RAFVR.
- 1174993 Corporal A. E. Williamson, RAFVR.
- 1616227 Corporal K. B. Yates, RAFVR.
- 1401504 Leading Aircraftmen D. M. Bowen, RAFVR.
- 1875753 Leading Aircraftmen N. A. J. Braithwaite, RAFVR.
- 1639606 Leading Aircraftmen E. A. A. Ciorra, RAFVR.
- 1652125 Leading Aircraftmen J. Coppack, RAFVR.
- 1872382 Leading Aircraftmen W. E. V. King, RAFVR.
- 1500639 Leading Aircraftmen H. E. Perry, RAFVR.
- 615953 Leading Aircraftmen W. R. Riley.
- 1307107 Leading Aircraftmen J. G. Russell, RAFVR.
- 1457498 Leading Aircraftmen C. B. Scott, RAFVR.
- 1902178 Leading Aircraftmen A. Ward, RAFVR.
- 973645 Leading Aircraftmen E. H. Williams, RAFVR.
- 1541799 Leading Aircraftmen W. A. D. Williams, RAFVR.

Women's Auxiliary Air Force

- Honorary Section Officer Y. E. M. Unternahrer (9902) (deceased).
- Assistant Section Officer L. V. Rolfe (9907) (deceased).
- Honorary Assistant Section Officer C. M. Lefort (9900) (deceased).

Royal Australian Air Force

- Flight Lieutenant T. B. Comins (Aus.402111).
- Flight Lieutenant F. J. Lawrenson, DFC (Aus.412544).
- Flight Lieutenant A. R. Mulligan, DFC (Aus.267825).
- Flying Officer J. S. Nott (Aus.421543).
- Warrant Officer V. J. Hibbens (Aus.400712).
- Flight Sergeant L. W. Calder (Aus.427416).

Royal Canadian Air Force

- Flight Lieutenant C. W. Floody (Can/J.5481).
- Flight Lieutenant G. P. Hughes (Can/J.4819).
- Flight Lieutenant D. E. Jenvey (Can/J. 11309).
- Flight Lieutenant L. N. Laing (Can/ J.26053).
- Flight Lieutenant P. A. Schnobb (Can/J. 12895).
- Flying Officer P. J. Anderson (Can/C.11369).
- Flying Officer R. E. Carter (Can/J.28855).
- Flying Officer W. E. Mclean (Can/J.35387).
- Flying Officer D. G. Smith (Can/J.35778).
- Flying Officer R. M. Smith (Can/1.36983).
- Pilot Officer P. B. Crosswell (Can/J.88362)
- Pilot Officer J. Y. J. C. Lamarre (Can/J.95374)
- Warrant Officer R. S. Dutka (Can/R.150976).
- Warrant Officer D. B. Machum (Can/R.153082).
- Warrant Officer O. J. L. Pratlett (Can/R.167080).
- Warrant Officer F. P. D. Quinn (Can/R.82607).
- Flight Sergeant F. J. Marsh (Can/R.266317).

Royal New Zealand Air Force

- Squadron Leader R. W. Fielder.
- Flight Lieutenant K. L. Lee (N.Z.41916).
- Flight Lieutenant S. D. Parnell (N.Z.391905).
- Flying Officer W. R. R. Neave (N.Z.4213913)
- Pilot Officer D. C. Henley (N.Z.414622).
- Warrant Officer F. V. Watkins (N.Z.404847).

South African Air Force

- Colonel L. A. Wilmot, DSO, DFC (102596).
- Major W. V. Brunton, DFC (27554V).
- Warrant Officer 2nd Class B. Peckitt (542798V).
- Warrant Officer 2nd Class T. M. N. Rowles (543208V).
- Air Corporal 17812 E. Hinds.

Royal Indian Air Force

- Corporal A. Rajendram (Ind/29228).

=== King's Police and Fire Services Medal ===
England and Wales

Police

- Stanley Pickering, Chief Constable, Stalybridge Borough Police Force.
- Cecil Eagles Lynch-Blosse, Chief Constable, Leicestershire Constabulary.
- Willis Clarke, Assistant Chief Constable, Derbyshire Constabulary.
- George Musgrave, Deputy Chief Constable, Oldham Borough Police Force.
- Edward Vivien Smith, Deputy Chief Constable, Sunderland Borough Police Force.
- Charles Godfrey Hayward, Detective Superintendent, City of London Police Force.
- Benjamin Lord, Superintendent, Buckinghamshire Constabulary.
- James Walker, Superintendent, West Riding of Yorkshire Constabulary.
- Alfred Dennis Smith, Superintendent, Metropolitan Police Force.
- John Smith, Sub-Divisional Inspector, Metropolitan Police Force.
- John Ernest Johnson, Sub-Divisional Inspector, Metropolitan Police Force.

Fire Services

- Sidney Parker Eglington, Company Officer (Part-time Retained), No. 13 (Norwich) Fire Force.
- Arthur Albert Ashton, Assistant Fire Force Commander (Sub-Area Commander), No. 27 (Manchester) Fire Force.
- Harold Hydes, BEM, Divisional Officer, No.37 (London) Fire Force.
- Louis Eldridge Calvo, Fire Force Commander, No. 32 (Worthing) Fire Force.
- Alick Haydon Finney, Fire Force Commander, No. 23 (Stoke) Fire Force.

Scotland

Police

- James Turner, Chief Constable, Airdrie Burgh Police Force.
- John Robertson, OBE, Chief Constable, Renfrewshire Constabulary.

Northern Ireland

Police

- Ronald Leslie Murray, County Inspector, Royal Ulster Constabulary.

Fire Services

- John Logan, Section Leader (Part-time Retained), Portrush, Co. Antrim.

Australia

- Stanley Mccarthy, Superintendent 1st Class, New South Wales Police Force.
- Walter James Noonan, Superintendent 3rd Class, New South Wales Police Force.
- Norman Devine James, Detective Superintendent 2nd Class, New South. Wales Police Force.
- Lionel Clarence Bowie, Superintendent 2nd Class, New South Wales Police Force.
- William Charles Watkins, Superintendent 2nd Class, New South Wales Police Force.
- Bertrand Earl Sadler, Superintendent 2nd Class, New South Wales Police Force.
- Stephen Pender, Sergeant 3rd Class, New South Wales Police Force.

India

- John Abernethy, Indian Police, District Superintendent of Police, Satara, Bombay.
- Rai Bahadur Jitendra Nath Ray, Indian Police, Superintendent of Police, Enforcement Branch, Bengal.
- Babu Satish Chandra Barua, Officiating Deputy Superintendent of Police, Chittagong, Bengal.
- Hirendra Nath Sircar, Indian Police, Deputy Commissioner of Police, Detective Department, Calcutta, Bengal.
- George Alfred Pearce, OBE, Indian Police, lately Deputy Inspector-General of Police, Headquarters, United Provinces.
- John Edward George Churcher, Indian Police, Commandant, Dehra Military Police, Bihar,
- Bhim Nath Misra, Officiating Superintendent of Police, Crime Assistant to the Deputy Inspector-General, C.I.D, Bihar.
- Khan Bahadur Abdul Khair Mullick, Deputy Superintendent of Police, Bihar.
- Claude Frederick Parry, OBE, Indian Police, Deputy Inspector-General of Police, Central Provinces and Berar.
- Khan Daud Khan, Officiating Deputy Superintendent of Police, North-West Frontier Province.

Colonies, Protectorates & Mandated Territories

- Jack Haliburton Ashmore, CPM, Commissioner of Police, Cyprus.
- Arthur Cyril Eattell, CPM, Deputy Superintendent of Police, Palestine.
- John Martin Flanagan, MBE, CPM, Deputy Superintendent of Police, Palestine.
- Henry Bennett Shaw, CPM, Superintendent of Police, Palestine.

=== Colonial Police Medal (CPM) ===
Southern Rhodesia

- Chikadza, 1st Class Native Sergeant, British South Africa Police.
- Walter James Stone, Inspector, British South Africa Police Reserve.

Bechuanaland Protectorate & Swaziland

- William Eland, Sergeant Major, Swaziland Police.
- Jacobus Paulus Engelbrecht, Assistant Superintendent, Swaziland Police.
- Clifford Owen Pryce Lewis, Assistant Superintendent, Bechuanaland Protectorate Police.
- Harry Pipe, Head Constable, Swaziland Police.
- Lattie Teheli, African Corporal (Lance Sergeant), Bechuanaland Protectorate Police.
- Frederick George White, Sergeant Major, Bechuanaland Protectorate Police.

Colonies, Protectorates & Mandated Territories

- Charles Hugh Fairfax Apthorp, Assistant Commissioner, Sierra Leone Police Force.
- William Victor Aubrey, Assistant Inspector, Kenya Police Force.
- Joshua Uberto Beckett, Staff Sergeant Major, Jamaica Constabulary.
- McGregor Bedeau, Constable, Windward Islands Police Force.
- Kunj Beharrysingh, Sergeant, British Guiana Police Force.
- Denis Henry Blake, Chief Officer, Auxiliary Fire Service, Hong Kong.
- John Albert Briance, Assistant Superintendent, Palestine Police Force.
- Norman Richard Cressy, Assistant Superintendent, Palestine Police Force.
- Sidney Arthur Dale, Chief Officer, Port Louis Fire Brigade, Mauritius.
- Lawrence Ferdinand de Coteau, Sergeant Major, Windward Islands Police Force.
- Derani Bin Koming, Sergeant Major, Malayan Police Service.
- Alexander Nathaniel Dixon, Staff Sergeant Major, Jamaica Constabulary.
- Alfred Hardy Edwards, Assistant Superintendent, Palestine Police Force.
- Alec Reginald Fairleigh, British Instructor, Palestine Police Force.
- Vernon Winston Farrell, Sergeant, Trinidad Police Force.
- Clarence Gooding, Foreman, Bridgetown Fire Brigade, Barbados.
- Zachariah Hamilton, Sergeant Major, Jamaica Constabulary.
- Alfred Herbert, Sergeant, Criminal Investigation Department, Windward Islands Police Force.
- Walter Alfred Jerome, Chief Inspector, Uganda Police Force.
- R. L. Jones, Constable, Windward Islands Police Force.
- Ali Karala, Assistant Inspector, Kenya Police Force.
- Percy Kewley, County Sergeant Major, British Guiana Police Force.
- Valentine Gilbert Lashley, Sub-Inspector, Trinidad Police Force.
- Lieutenant-Colonel Dhonaill Patrick Macnamara, Commandant, Malayan Police Service.
- Mahmoodl Bin Wahab, Senior Inspector, Malayan Police Service.
- Thomas George Martin, Constable, Palestine Police Force.
- Reginald Townend Michelin, Superintendent, Nigeria Police Force.
- Lewis George Mitchell, Assistant Inspector, Kenya Police Force.
- Donald Gordon Neish, Inspector, Jamaica Constabulary.
- Daniel Riley, Sub-Inspector, Port of Spain Fire Brigade, Trinidad.
- Captain Frederick Brooke Sharp, Superintendent, Nigeria Police Force.
- Lauraeston Sharp, Assistant Superintendent, Uganda Police Force.
- Karter Singh, Sergeant, Malayan Police Service.
- Soloman Soffer, Assistant Superintendent, Palestine Police Force.
- Thaddeus Ebenezer Spencer, Staff Sergeant Major, Jamaica Constabulary.
- Ahmed Sultan, Chief Inspector, Zanzibar Police Force.
- Frederick William Syer, Assistant Inspector General, Palestine Police Force.
- Gordon Denis Toulson, Acting Deputy Superintendent, Palestine Police Force.
- James Hector Macdonald Williams, Inspector, Palestine Police Force.
- Yeop Osman Bin Abdul Wahab, Malayan Police Service.
- Abdullahi Warsama, Sub-Inspector, British Somaliland Police.
- Abdul Latif El Haj Hussein Zeldan, Corporal, Palestine Police Force.
