= Lee Rubber Building =

Building in Kuala Lumpur, Malaysia

Coordinates: 3°08′N 101°42′E

- Bangunan Lee Rubber
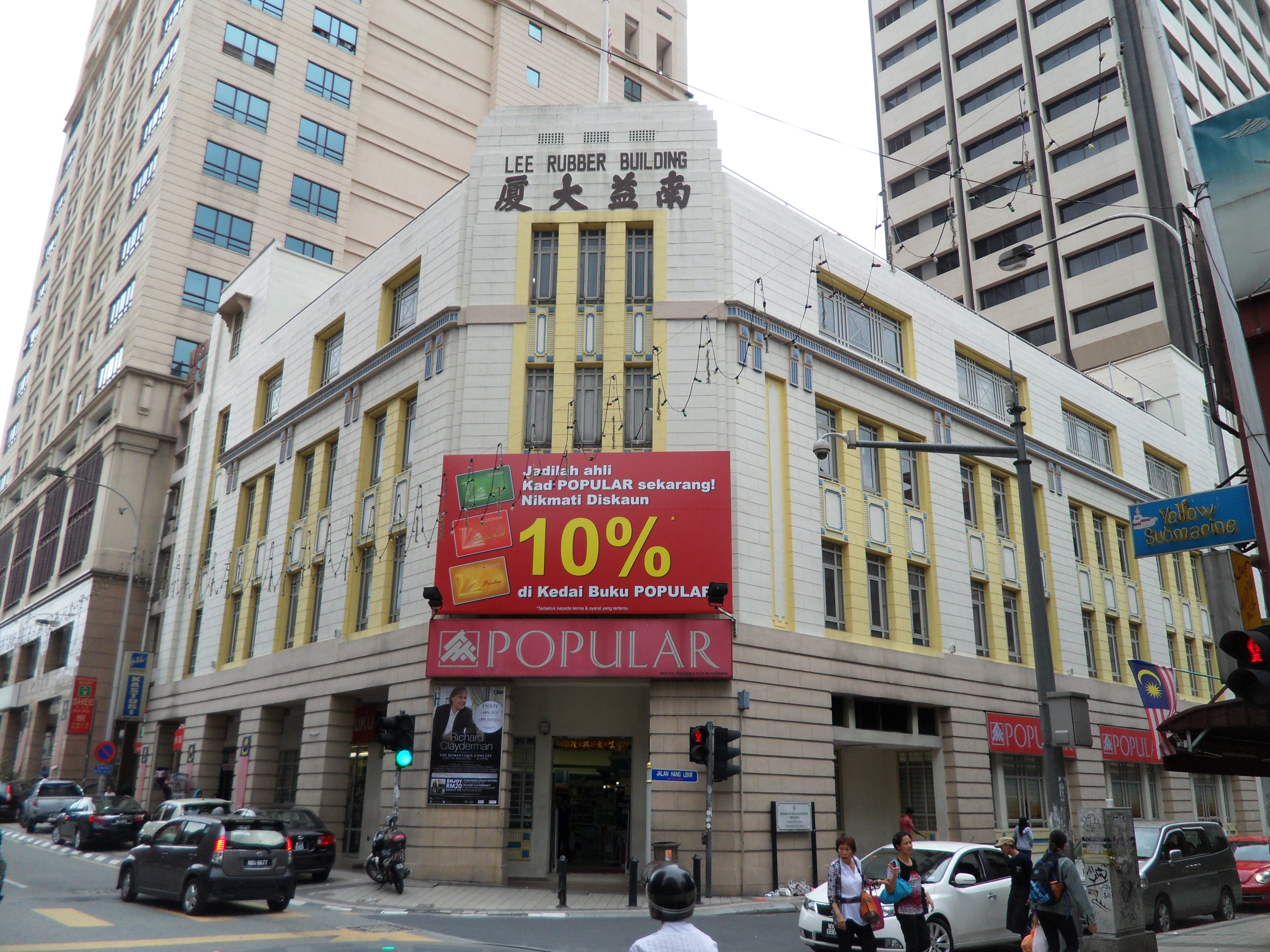
- Interactive map of the Lee Rubber Building area

General information
- Architectural style: Art Deco
- Location: Kuala Lumpur, Malaysia
- Completed: 1930
- Owner: GF Land Sdn Bhd

Technical details
- Floor count: 5
- Floor area: 988 m^{2}

Design and construction
- Architect: Arthur Oakley Coltman

The Lee Rubber Building (Malay: Bangunan Lee Rubber) is a historical building in Kuala Lumpur, Malaysia.

== Architecture ==
Lee Rubber Building is located at the corner of Jalan Tun H. S. Lee and Jalan Hang Lekir (known as High Street and Cecil Street during the British colonial era). The building was designed by Arthur Oakley Coltman of the British architecture firm, Booty Edwards & Partners company. Its grey façade sports the Modernist Art Deco design as its architectural style, with striated lines and mouldings complete with differentiated corner treatment topped with an essential flag pole. Its five-foot way is broken by solid wall-like pillars. It has a strong geometric shape with a corner set at a 45° angle. Like most urban Art Deco structures, the original building has a flat roof with no cornice or overhang. It also has a pediment that portrays the building's original name in English and Chinese.

== History ==
The building was constructed in 1930. Upon completion, it was the tallest building in Kuala Lumpur at that time. In 1942-1945, the building was used by the Japanese government as the headquarters of Japanese secret police during World War II. In 1950s, an additional floor was added to the structure, making it a five-story building. In 2003, Popular bookshop opened for operation in the building. The building was put up for sale in 2015 by its former owner, Lee Rubber Group; the Popular bookstore and the Kasturi tuition centre upstairs vacated the building several months later as a result. Nevertheless, Kuala Lumpur City Hall by-laws prohibit the demolition or significant structural alteration to the heritage building.

In 2016, the then-85-year-old structure, was sold to Singapore-based GF Land Sdn Bhd whom set out to convert the historic building into a new landmark. The Lee Rubber Building was turned into a small luxury hotel, named Else Kuala Lumpur featuring 49 guestrooms and suites and opened for the public on August 11, 2022. On top of the original four-storey structure, a new podium and an additional two floors are constructed. The building also sports a series of atriums to bring in natural light and ventilation .

The building is preserved under the National Heritage Act and is listed as a heritage structure category 2 by Kuala Lumpur City Hall. This entails a preservation of the entire façade.

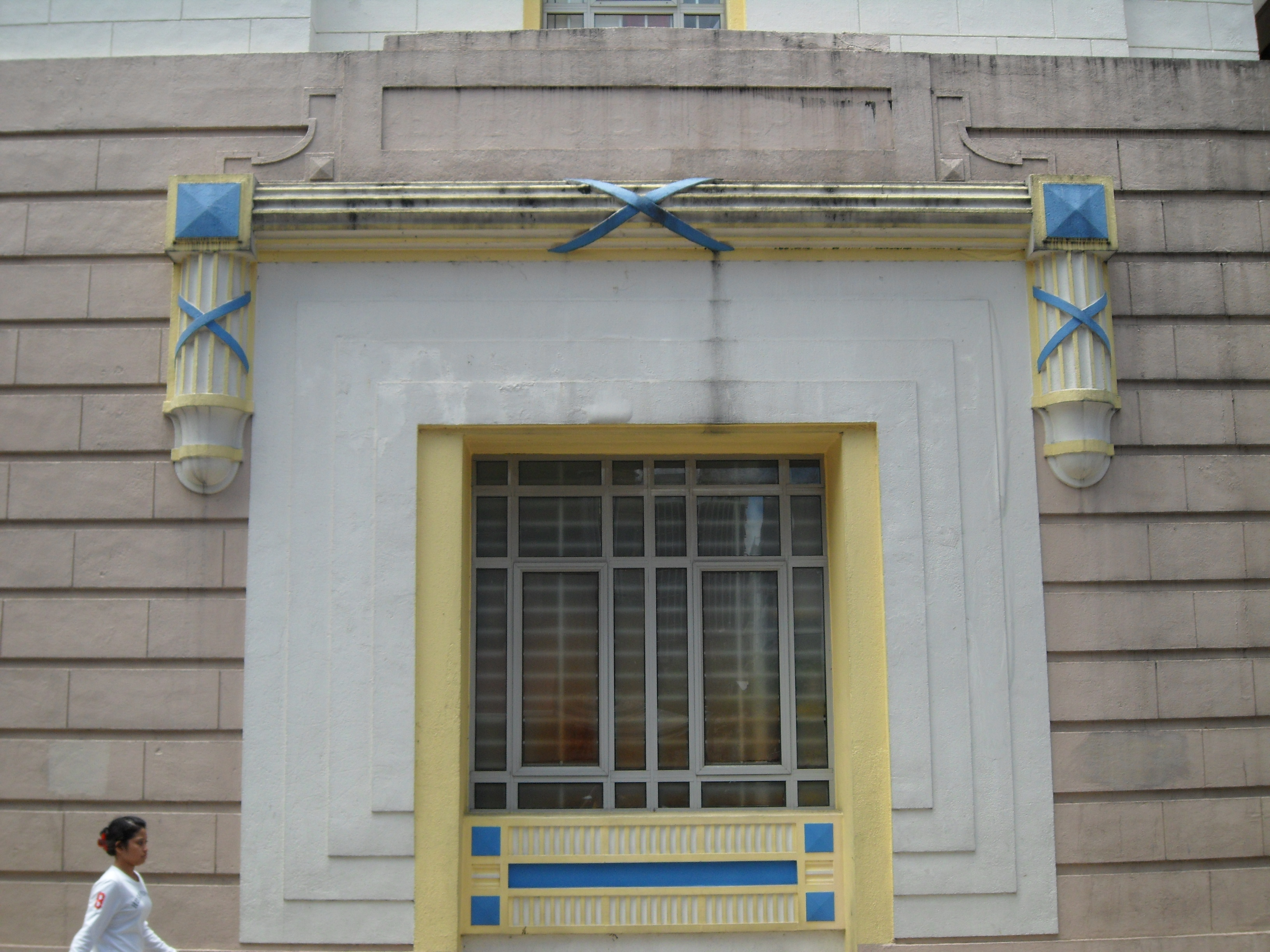
Art Deco detail of northern wing of Lee Rubber Building.

== Transportation ==
The building is accessible within walking distance northeast of Pasar Seni LRT/MRT station.

== See also ==
- List of tourist attractions in Kuala Lumpur
