= Sultan Abdul Aziz Shah Airport =

Civilian airport in Subang, Selangor, Malaysia

Sultan Abdul Aziz Shah Airport Lapangan Terbang Sultan Abdul Aziz Shah
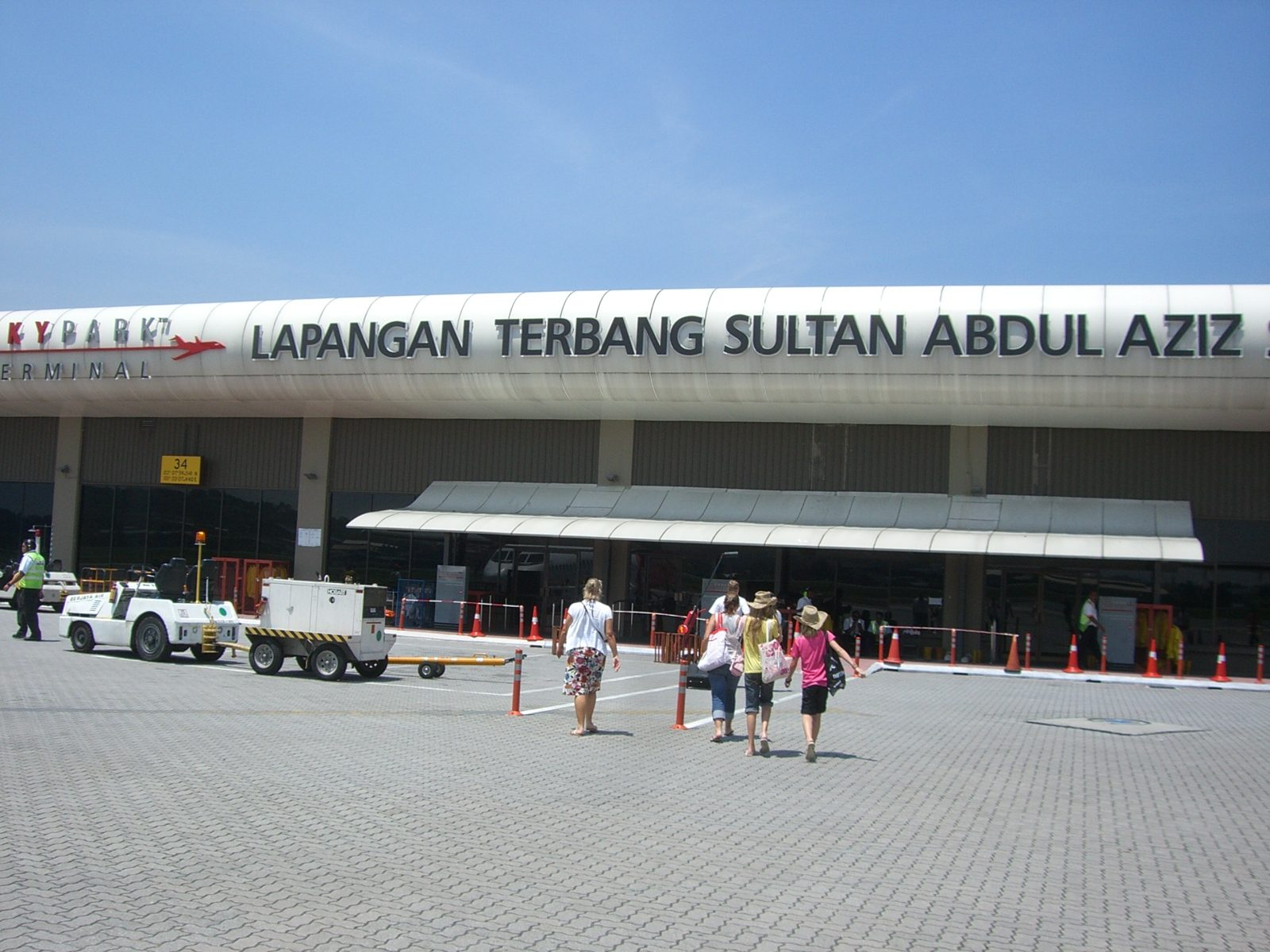
- Exterior view of the newly refurbished Subang skypark terminal from the pavement
- IATA: SZB; ICAO: WMSA; WMO: 48647

Summary
- Airport type: Public
- Owner/Operator: MASB/Government of Malaysia
- Serves: Greater Kuala Lumpur
- Location: Subang, Petaling District, Selangor, Malaysia
- Opened: 30 August 1965; 61 years ago
- Hub for: Firefly
- Focus city for: Berjaya Air
- Time zone: MST (UTC+08:00)
- Elevation AMSL: 89 ft (27 m)
- Coordinates: 03°07′52″N 101°32′53″E

Map
- Location in Subang Jaya, Selangor, Peninsular Malaysia SZB/WMSA (Peninsular Malaysia) SZB/WMSA (Malaysia) SZB/WMSA (Southeast Asia) SZB/WMSA (Asia)

Runways
Direction	Length		Surface
Direction	m	ft	Surface
15/33	3,780	12,402	Asphalt

Statistics (2020)
- Passengers: 949,934 (▼58.0%)
- Cargo (tonnes): 58,260 (▲68.1%)
- Aircraft movements: 49,454 (▼38.6%)
- Source: official website AIP Malaysia

Sultan Abdul Aziz Shah Airport (IATA: SZB, ICAO: WMSA) also known as Subang SkyPark, — formerly Subang International Airport/Kuala Lumpur International Airport, and often called Subang Airport — is an airport located in Subang, Petaling District, Selangor, Malaysia. It served as the main airport for Kuala Lumpur from 1965 to 1998, replacing the former Sungai Besi Airport, before being succeeded by the newer Kuala Lumpur International Airport in Sepang.

The airport serves as a central hub for regional and charter carriers, including Batik Air Malaysia, Firefly, Berjaya Air, MHS Aviation and Weststar Aviation. It continues to attract travelers from Kuala Lumpur due to its proximity to the city center and convenient location in the Klang Valley.

As of 2024, commercial jet operations have returned to Sultan Abdul Aziz Shah Airport, linking Subang to several regional destinations. It remains an important center for general aviation and domestic flights, with ongoing plans for further development. The airport is also aiming to become a leading center for aircraft Maintenance, Repair and Overhaul (MRO) services, as well as other aerospace activities in the region.

== Background and Development ==
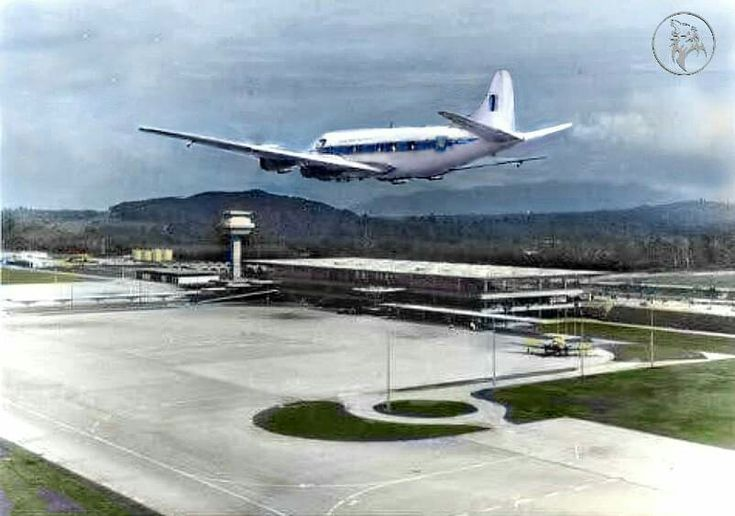
A Royal Malaysian Air Force, de Havilland Heron aircraft on a test flight at the newly constructed Subang International Airport, 1965

=== Planning and Construction ===
The construction of Sultan Abdul Aziz Shah Airport, initially named Subang International Airport, commenced in 1961 and was completed in 1965 at a cost of approximately RM52 million (then equivalent to $64 million). Built on 535 hectares of land, the airport was part of a larger government initiative to establish a modern international gateway for Malaysia. The decision was made in 1960, recognising the need for a new, larger airport to replace the aging Sungai Besi Airport.

The airport was designed by architects Kington Loo and C.H.R. Bailey of the Booty Edwards Architectural practice. It has a floating concrete shell roof and a circular ramp, inspired by the penguin pavilion at London Zoo by Berthold Lubetkin, provided a distinctive visual focal point, contributing to the airport's architectural identity.

On 30 August 1965, the airport officially opened its doors, becoming Malaysia's primary international gateway. The inauguration ceremony was attended by more than 1,500 guests and was officiated by the Yang di-Pertuan Agong, Tuanku Syed Putra ibni Almarhum Syed Hassan Jamalullail. The first commercial flight to land at the airport, a Malaysian Airways Silver Kris (De Havilland Comet) from Singapore, arrived at 8:15 a.m. on the following Wednesday.

The airport's runway, measuring (3,500 m (11,482 ft 11 in) long, 45 m (147 ft 8 in) wide – runway 15 – 33), was the longest in Southeast Asia at the time, making it capable of handling large, long-haul aircraft. With this infrastructure, Subang International Airport replaced the Sungai Besi Airport (also known as Sempang Airport), which had served as the main airport for Kuala Lumpur before its closure.

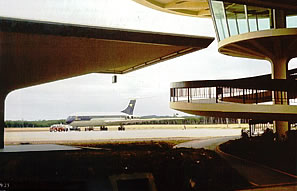
A British Overseas Airways Corporation (BOAC) Vickers VC10, with the outdoor circular ramp for passenger boarding and disembarkation.

=== Growth and Expansion ===
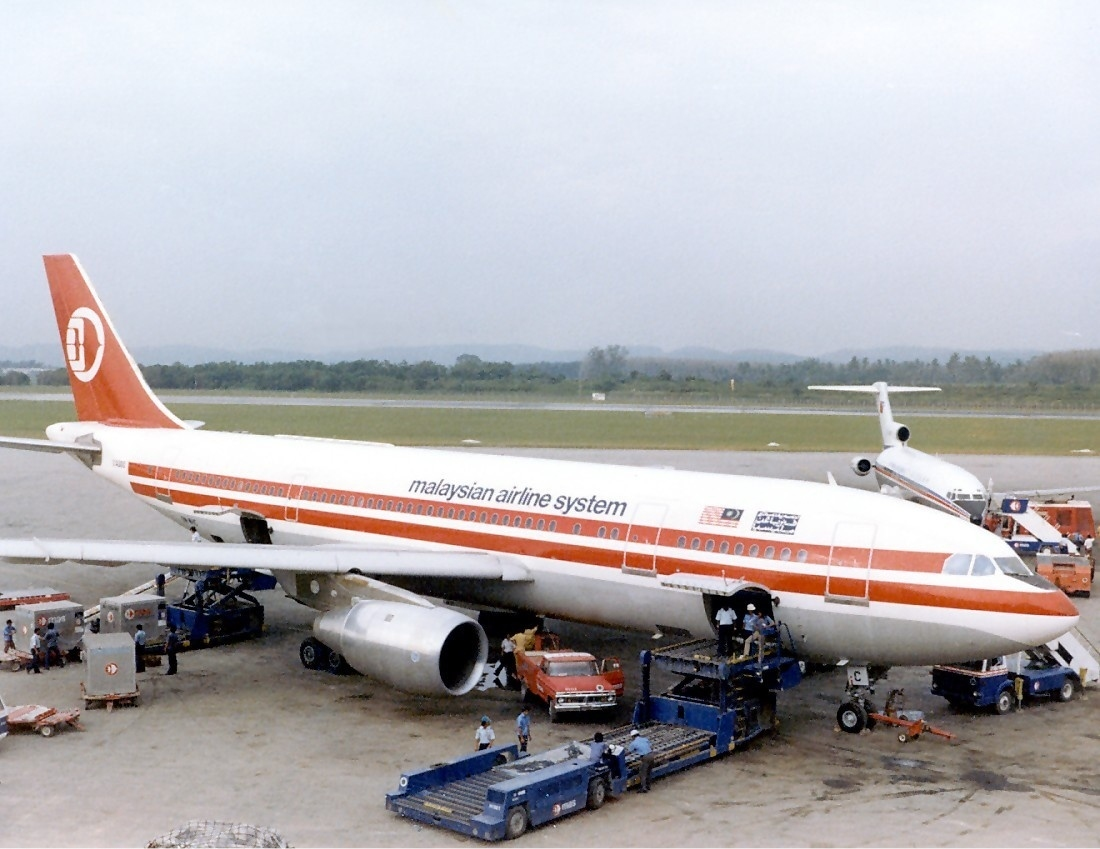
A Malaysian Airline System Airbus A300 at Subang Airport in 1982, with a China Airlines Boeing 727 in the background

After its inauguration in 1965, Subang International Airport quickly became Malaysia's primary aviation hub, handling both international and domestic flights. During the 1970s and 1980s, the airport underwent several expansions to meet the growing demand for air travel in the country.

One of the most significant renovations began in 1980, with the goal of modernising and expanding the airport. This expansion resulted in the removal of several original design features, including the distinctive circular ramp and sections of the floating roof. These changes were implemented to accommodate the growing number of passengers and meet increasing operational demands.

The renovation progressed slowly at first, causing frustration for Prime Minister Datuk Seri Dr. Mahathir Mohamad. To expedite the process, he instructed that Terminal 2 be extended to handle all airport operations, allowing Terminal 1 to undergo complete renovations.

The upgraded Terminal 1, unveiled on June 1, 1983, was celebrated for its "ultra-modern" features, which were considered groundbreaking at the time. These included a baggage trolley conveyor, nose-in aircraft parking apron, 12 aerobridges, duty-free shops and walkalators. The introduction of aerobridges marked a major improvement, eliminating the need for passengers to board aircraft via stairs, though it also ended the tradition of waving off passengers from the viewing gallery. This gallery was eventually closed off for security reasons, with passengers now being seen off behind double-glazed glass.

On 1 December 1989, Terminal 2 took over all domestic flights. It continued to handle domestic services until 16 December 1993, when Terminal 3 assumed responsibility.

According to Google Earth, the runway was extended to its current length of 3,780m between 1989 and 1990.

By 1993, Subang Airport had three terminals:

- Terminal 1: Dedicated to international flights.
- Terminal 2: Used primarily for the Kuala Lumpur-Singapore shuttle flights operated by Malaysia Airlines and Singapore Airlines.
- Terminal 3: Focused on domestic flights, improving the efficiency of both domestic and international operations.

The airport’s growth continued through the 1990s, with Subang handling a record 15.8 million passengers by the end of 1997, the year before its operations were transferred to Kuala Lumpur International Airport (KLIA). In recognition of the airport's significance, it was renamed Sultan Abdul Aziz Shah Airport in March 1996, after the then Sultan of Selangor, Sultan Salahuddin Abdul Aziz Shah Al-Haj, who also served as the 11th Yang di-Pertuan Agong.

Despite these advancements, the airport faced operational challenges as it continued to handle a rising volume of air traffic. In particular, Subang was affected by two major fires in the 1990s that disrupted its operations. The first fire occurred in April 1992, resulting in the deaths of three security guards from the Civil Aviation Department and causing significant damage to 29 duty-free shops. The loss was estimated between RM20 million and RM30 million. Investigations revealed that the fire was caused by faulty wiring carried out by unqualified contractors. Another fire broke out in the airport's control tower in October 1992, destroying critical radar systems, computers and other equipment worth over RM2 million. A former assistant air traffic controller was later convicted for causing the fire and sentenced to 10 years in prison.

As Subang's capacity continued to be stretched, the Malaysian government recognised the need for a new, larger airport to accommodate future growth. This led to the development of Kuala Lumpur International Airport (KLIA), which officially opened in 1998. KLIA took over Subang's role as the country’s primary international gateway and Subang's operations were scaled back to regional and domestic flights.

=== Skypark Terminal Transformation Plan ===
With Kuala Lumpur International Airport (KLIA) taking over as Malaysia’s primary international gateway in 1998, Subang Airport’s role significantly diminished. In response to this shift, the government initiated a redevelopment strategy, leading to the demolition of Terminal 1 in 2003.

Despite interest from AirAsia in establishing Subang as its operational base in 2004, the government maintained a policy limiting the airport’s use to general aviation and turboprop flights. This restriction ultimately set the stage for Subang Airport’s rebranding as Subang Skypark, redefining it as a hub focused on general and corporate aviation rather than mainstream commercial travel. This transformation allowed the facility to pivot towards serving private and regional aviation needs, positioning it as a key center for corporate aviation services in Malaysia.

In December 2007, Subang SkyPark Sdn Bhd announced a RM300 million transformation plan to revamp Terminal 3, enhancing its appeal as a corporate aviation hub. The project included the construction of a five-star executive lounge, expanded hangar facilities and improved infrastructure to support maintenance, repair and overhaul (MRO) services. The renovation added two large MRO hangars and ten parking hangars, making Subang an attractive base for private and corporate aviation.

The transformation included amenities for passengers and operators, such as additional office space, lecture rooms and a cafeteria within the new hangars. VistaJet, a global private jet service provider, chose Subang Skypark as its Malaysian base in August 2008, offering business jet services to destinations worldwide. In 2009, a RM40 million facelift was given to Subang Airport’s check-in terminals. While parking capacity remained a concern, valet services were introduced, with daily parking fees set at RM25. The airport saw further enhancements in accessibility when a rail link to Kuala Lumpur Sentral, operated by KTM Komuter, was added in 2018. This provided travelers a convenient transit option from central Kuala Lumpur.

On 28 October 2009, Prime Minister Datuk Seri Najib Tun Razak officiated the renovated Subang Skypark Terminal. He expressed confidence in Subang's potential to become a regional ASEAN hub, with a target of serving two million passengers annually.

=== Asia Aerospace City ===
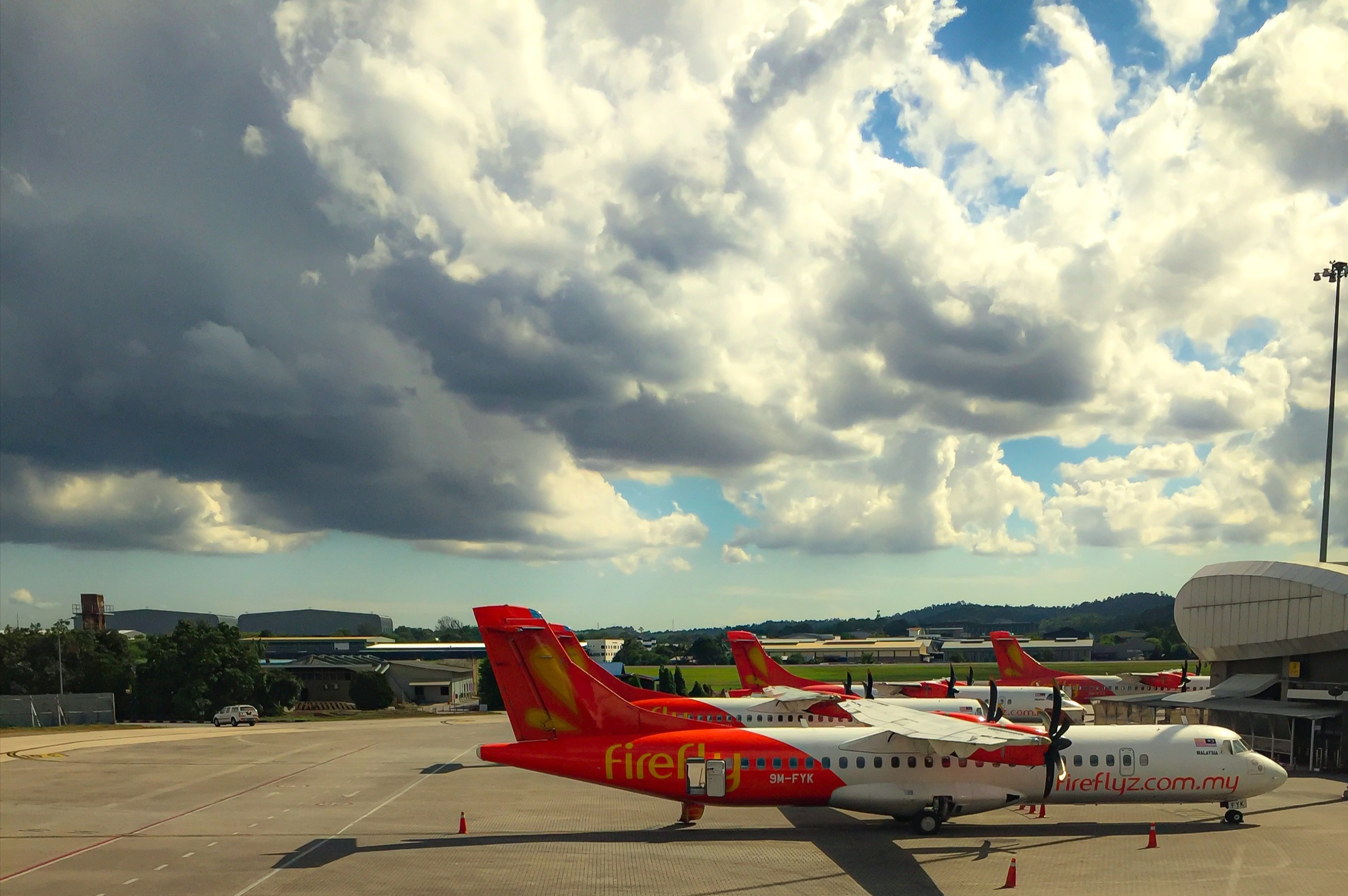
Apron view of Subang SkyPark showing several Firefly ATR72 aircraft parked at the terminal

In August 2012, Subang SkyPark Sdn Bhd announced the SkyPark Nexus project, a RM420 million initiative aimed at transforming Subang SkyPark into a dynamic aerospace city. Spanning 4 to 4.8 hectares near Terminal 3, the proposed development included a boutique hotel, an aviation museum, a theme park and a retail mall with a total built-up area of one million square feet. A unique feature of the plan was a pedestrian bridge connecting the mall to the terminal, a concept rarely seen in urban airports. The project also included the construction of five state-of-the-art hangars for private and corporate jets, each accommodating up to five aircraft.

However, in 2015, the SkyPark Nexus project was put on hold due to various challenges, including changes in the development landscape and shifts in focus towards other initiatives. The project was later integrated into the broader Asia Aerospace City (AAC) development, a larger RM1.7 billion initiative led by Majlis Amanah Rakyat (Mara) and supported by Khazanah Nasional Bhd. The AAC project, which aims to position Subang as a major aerospace hub, is expected to encompass many of the elements originally proposed in the SkyPark Nexus project. Despite delays, the vision for transforming Subang SkyPark into a dynamic aerospace city continues through the AAC's revival, which focuses on enhancing aviation infrastructure and supporting aerospace-related industries.

In July 2021, Malaysia Airports Holdings Bhd (MAHB) announced the redevelopment of Terminal 2 into advanced hangars for business aviation under the LTSAAS Regeneration plan. The redevelopment, driven by demand from operators like Berjaya Air and Smooth Route, aims to increase the capacity of the Subang Aerotech Park by 280%. The project is expected to drive significant growth in Malaysia's business aviation sector, support the country's Aerospace Blueprint 2030 and solidify Subang's role as a competitive business aviation hub in the Asia-Pacific region. The transformation of Terminal 2 into hangars will be the first phase of this redevelopment.

=== Subang Airport Regeneration Plan (SARP) and Resumption of Jet Services ===
The Subang Airport Regeneration Plan (SARP), approved in 2023, aims to transform Sultan Abdul Aziz Shah Airport into a major city airport and aviation hub by 2030. The plan is projected to generate a gross output of RM216.6 billion and a value-added contribution of RM93.7 billion over 25 years, accounting for approximately 1% of Selangor's GDP. It is also expected to create 8,000 direct jobs, with 11% in high-skilled, 48% in mid-skilled and 41% in low-skilled positions. As part of SARP's development, the airport's capacity is set to increase, reaching 5 million passengers annually in four to five years and 8 million passengers by 2030. The first phase of the plan involves a RM1.3 billion redevelopment to upgrade the airport into a city airport capable of handling 5 million passengers per year.

In line with the airport's transformation, Sultan Abdul Aziz Shah Airport resumed jet operations in July 2024 after a 22-year hiatus. Starting 1 August 2024, five airlines—AirAsia, Firefly, TransNusa, Batik Air Malaysia and Scoot—began operating flights from Subang to regional destinations. This move marked a shift from the airport's previous focus on turboprop, helicopter and private jet services, driven by the increasing demand at Kuala Lumpur International Airport (KLIA), which has reached full capacity.

To accommodate the resumption of jet services, the airport’s infrastructure was upgraded, including the reconfiguration of the apron to accommodate narrow-body aircraft like the Boeing 737 and Airbus A320. The terminal’s floor area was also expanded and new check-in counters and self-service kiosks were introduced to improve passenger experience. Subang’s passenger capacity is expected to double to 3 million annually with these upgrades.

As part of SARP, efforts are underway to reinstate the Skypark Link commuter train service, which connects Subang Airport to KL Sentral, further improving regional accessibility. Long-term plans for the airport also include establishing an aerospace ecosystem, developing business aviation facilities, and creating a drone testing site. These initiatives align with SARP’s vision of making Subang a comprehensive aviation and aerospace hub by 2030.

== Airlines and destinations ==
=== Passenger ===
Airlines	Destinations
Batik Air Malaysia	Bangkok–Don Mueang, Denpasar (begins 2 December 2026), Jakarta–Soekarno-Hatta, Johor Bahru, Kota Bharu, Kota Kinabalu, Kuching, Langkawi, Miri (begins 1 December 2026), Penang, Sibu (begins 1 December 2026), Singapore; Charter: Kunming
Berjaya Air	Hat Yai, Hua Hin, Koh Samui, Penang, Phu Quoc; Charter: Langkawi, Redang
Firefly	Alor Setar, Johor Bahru, Kota Bharu, Kuala Terengganu, Langkawi, Penang, Singapore–Seletar
HK Express	Hong Kong
Scoot	Singapore
TransNusa	Jakarta–Soekarno-Hatta

== Aviation Services ==
SkyPark Terminal provides a wide range of aviation services beyond passenger and cargo operations, including charter flights, flying clubs and helicopter support. Notable flying clubs based at the terminal include Subang Flying Club, Air Adventure Flying Club and ESB Flying Club.

ExecuJet MRO Services, a subsidiary of Dassault Aviation SA and Smooth Route offer aircraft maintenance services. Dnest Aviation Services, a fixed-base operator, provides high-end ground handling, refueling and maintenance coordination services for private and corporate aviation.

Additionally, Eurocopter operates a facility at the terminal for servicing helicopters used by the Malaysian Maritime Enforcement Agency. The headquarters of Berjaya Air is also located within the Berjaya Hangar at SkyPark Terminal.

== Traffic and statistics ==
Annual passenger numbers and aircraft statistics
Year	Passengers handled	Passenger % change	Cargo (metric tonnes)	Cargo % change	Aircraft movements	Aircraft % change
1994	11,343,648	Steady	262,053	Steady	137,871	Steady
1995	12,776,877	▲12.6	325,871	▲24.4	146,248	▲6.1
1996	14,556,879	▲13.9	372,339	▲14.3	163,493	▲11.8
1997	15,819,863	▲8.7	413,695	▲11.1	162,652	▼0.5
1998	8,263,930	▼47.8	166,794	▼59.7	88,882	▼45.3
1999	1,999,302	▼75.8	14,069	▼91.6	27,753	▼68.8
2000	2,100,727	▲5.1	15,893	▲13.0	38,129	▲37.4
2001	1,955,688	▼6.9	14,445	▼9.1	35,691	▼6.4
2002	1,130,169	▼42.2	12,261	▼15.1	28,170	▼21.1
2003	72,491	▼93.6	14,358	▲17.1	19,616	▼30.4
2004	90,593	▲25.0	18,670	▲30.0	22,757	▲16.0
2005	83,602	▼7.7	46,082	▲146.8	29,668	▲30.4
2006	83,502	▼0.12	71,953	▲56.1	36,626	▲23.4
2007	95,583	▲14.5	63,382	▼11.9	44,302	▲21.0
2008	307,747	▲222.0	18,473	▼70.8	46,989	▲6.1
2009	819,840	▲166.4	18,536	▼0.3	55,148	▲17.4
2010	1,118,309	▲36.4	19,988	▲7.8	63,616	▲15.3
2011	1,320,227	▲18.0	19,928	▼0.3	68,135	▲7.1
2012	1,442,514	▲9.3	22,680	▲13.8	74,008	▲8.6
2013	1,859,020	▲28.9	26,443	▲16.6	80,047	▲8.2
2014	2,762,556	▲48.6	28,128	▲6.4	91,529	▲14.3
2015	3,059,144	▲10.7	31,357	▲11.5	95,845	▲4.7
2016	2,834,836	▼7.3	36,147	▲15.3	94,544	▼1.4
2017	2,880,586	▲1.6	36,568	▲1.2	98,955	▲4.7
2018	1,964,059	▼31.8	32,284	▼11.7	80,775	▼18.4
2019	2,259,595	▲15.0	34,648	▲7.3	80,606	▼0.2
2020	949,934	▼58.0	58,260	▲68.1	49,454	▼38.6
2021	577,984	▼39.2	83,519	▲43.4	35,494	▼33.1
2022	1,548,148	▲167.9	74,903	▼10.3	60,346	▲70.0
2023	1,379,176	▼10.9	28,426	▼62.1	52,509	▼13.0
2024	1,425,199	▲3.3	12,400	▼56.4	59,929	▲14.1
2025	1,859,173	▲30.5	14,721	▲18.7	26,929	▼55.1
^{Source: Malaysia Airports Holdings Berhad}

== Ground transportation ==
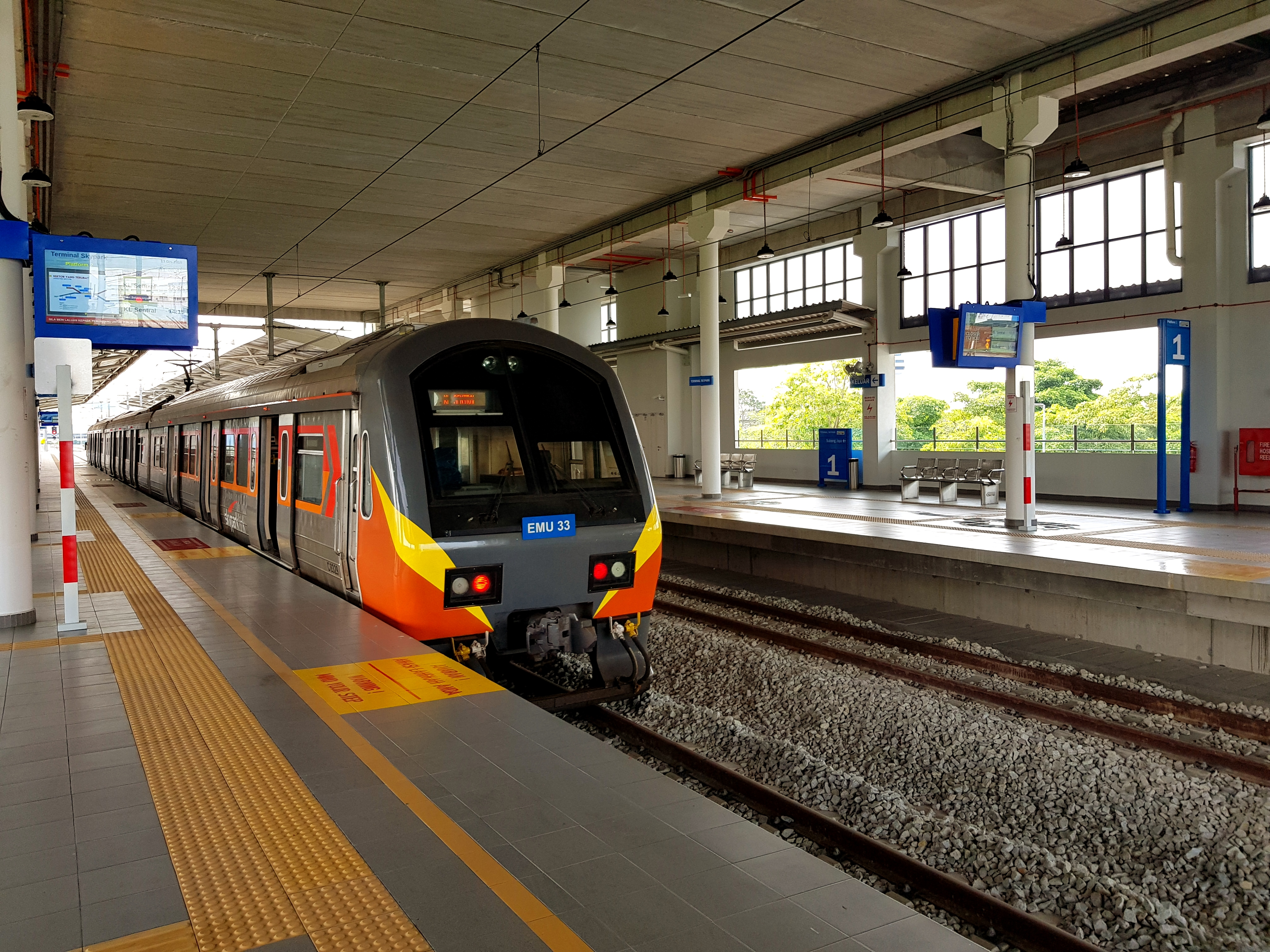
The Skypark Link train at Terminal Skypark. The service is currently suspended.

=== Bus ===
==== Stage Bus ====
The airport is served by Rapid KL buses, which provide connections to the Kelana Jaya line, MRT Kajang Line, and the Kuala Lumpur city centre.

- 772: This trunk route connects Pasar Seni (Central Market) to Subang Suria via the airport. It is the primary connection for passengers transferring from the LRT, as it stops at the Ara Damansara and Asia Jaya stations.
- T804: An MRT feeder bus service connecting the airport to Kwasa Sentral.

Route	Destination	Via	Connecting Rail
772	Subang Suria / Pasar Seni	Subang Airport; Ara Damansara; Asia Jaya	Kelana Jaya Line
T804	Kwasa Sentral	Subang Airport; Subang Perdana	Kajang Line

==== Airport Shuttle ====
An airport shuttle bus service operates between Subang Skypark and the main Kuala Lumpur International Airport terminals (KLIA T1 & T2). The journey takes approximately one hour depending on traffic conditions.

=== Rail ===
The terminal was previously served by the Skypark Link, a dedicated KTM Komuter service connecting KL Sentral to Terminal Skypark via Subang Jaya. The 26 km line opened in May 2018 to provide direct rail connectivity to the airport.

However, the service was suspended effective 15 February 2023 due to low ridership. Currently, there is no active rail service directly to the airport; passengers are advised to alight at Ara Damansara LRT station and transfer to bus 772.

== Accidents and incidents ==
- 11 May 1976 – British Airways Flight 888, a Boeing 747-100 from London to Melbourne via Bahrain, Bangkok and Kuala Lumpur, was on approach to Runway 15 when it flew below the normal flight path, hitting trees 2.2 nautical miles before the runway threshold. On landing, inspection of the aircraft revealed damage to the main landing gear; strike marks on the fuselage and engine intakes; and evidence of debris ingestion on the two left-side engines.
- 27 September 1977 – Japan Airlines Flight 715, a Douglas DC-8, crashed into a hill in bad weather while attempting to land on Runway 15. 34 people, including 8 of the 10 crew members and 26 of the 69 passengers, were killed when the aircraft broke on impact.
- 18 December 1983 – Malaysian Airline System Flight 684, an Airbus A300 from Singapore crashed 2 km short of the runway while approaching Runway 15 in bad weather. There were no fatalities, but the aircraft was written off. Ironically, the aircraft was operating its last scheduled flight for Malaysian Airline System, before being returned to its original operator, Scandinavian Airlines System.
- 19 February 1989 – Flying Tiger Line Flight 066, a Boeing 747-200F from Singapore crashed 12 kilometres from the airport while on approach to Runway 33. The pilots misinterpreted the controller's instructions to descend, causing the aircraft to fly below minimum altitude and crash into a hillside on the outskirts of Puchong. All four flight crew were killed.
- 18 March 2019 – At approximately 3.20am, an accident had happened on the runway of Sultan Abdul Aziz Shah Airport Subang involving a privately owned Bombardier Challenger 300 and an airport engineering vehicle. The vehicle was on the runway to escort contractors fixing the lighting of the runway when the airport staff driving it fell asleep while waiting for the contractors to finish their work. The contractors vacated the runway upon seeing the landing lights of the approaching aircraft while the airport staff in the vehicle had died from the incident a few days later. Two air traffic controllers were suspended due to the incident.
- 24 March 2021 - At 9.25am, an Airbus AS350 B3 helicopter crashed at the airport. There were five people on board, including one pilot and four passengers. All the victims were taken to the hospital for further treatment, two persons were reportedly injured and one suffered a broken leg and head injury. It left Sungai Lembing in Pahang at 8.30am and was on a private flight to Subang via Maran, Temerloh, Karak and the Batu Caves. A safety investigation will be conducted by Malaysia's Air Accident Investigation Bureau.
- 17 August 2023 - At 2.51pm, N28JV, a Beechcraft Premier I crashed at a highway two minutes drive from Sultan Abdul Aziz Shah Airport. There were 10 fatalities involving eight people on the aircraft including Pelangai state assemblyman Johari Harun and two people on the highway. The aircraft departed Langkawi International Airport at 2.08pm heading to Sultan Abdul Aziz Shah Airport.

== Other shared facilities ==
- AIROD is located north of the passenger terminal and occupies the land there.
- RMAF Subang Air Base is located on the western side of the runway, shared with the MMEA hangar.
- Various hangars storing corporate jets are located south of the Passenger Terminal.
- The Police Air Unit base for Peninsular Malaysia is located at the extreme south of the airfield, the latest addition after shifting there from Sungai Besi Air Base in 2018.
