= Market Square clock tower, Kuala Lumpur =

Clock tower in Kuala Lumpur, Malaysia

Coordinates: 3°08′51″N 101°41′45″E

Market Square clock tower
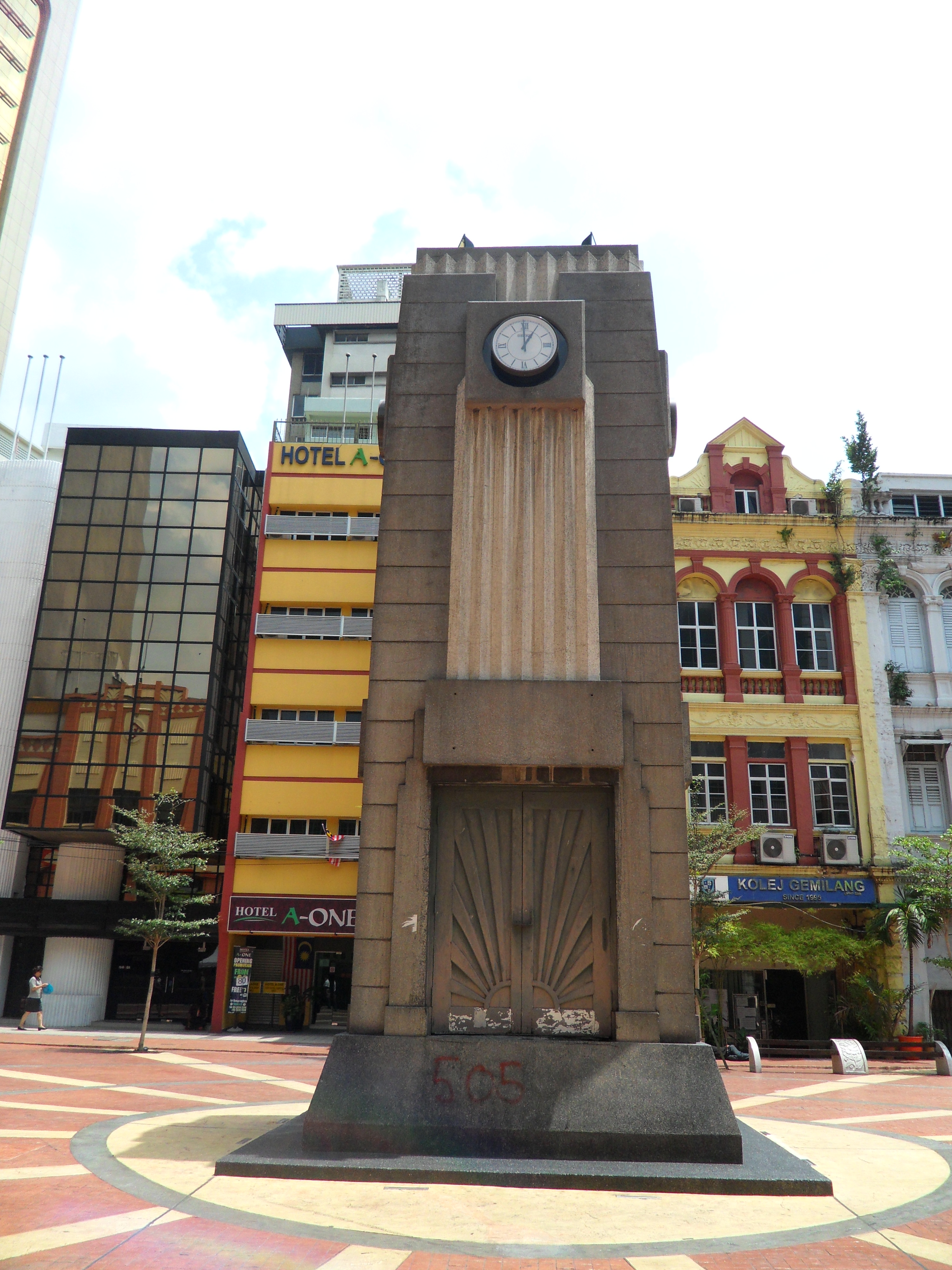
- Market Square clock tower, Kuala Lumpur
- Built: 1937
- Built for: Coronation of King George VI
- Architect: Arthur Oakley Coltman
- Architectural style(s): Art Deco

The Market Square clock tower is situated in Kuala Lumpur, Malaysia.

== History ==
The clock tower was completed in 1937 to commemorate the coronation of King George VI and was designed by the English architect Arthur Oakley Coltman of Booty Edwards and Partners, Kuala Lumpur.

== Architecture ==
The clock tower was built in the Art Deco style and is decorated with a sunburst motif on its sides commonly used in Art Deco design patterns. It is 25 feet high and originally bore a commemorative plaque which was removed after Malaysia gained independence in 1957.
