= Kington Loo =

Malaysian architect

Kington Loo (17 October 1930 – 21 March 2003) was an architect in Malaysia who belongs to the group who brought modernism to Southeast Asia in the wake of World War II. The firm he worked for, Booty and Edwards, became a leader in the region. His mother, Lok Soh June, was an accomplished piano player and was the sixth daughter of millionaire businessman Loke Chow Kit; his father, the engineer Yuson Loo, was the great-grandson of prominent businessman Loke Yew. He was married and had a daughter, Ysa Loo.

== Early life ==
Kington Loo lived in various parts of South East Asia before he settled professionally in Malaya. He was educated in Batu Road School in Kuala Lumpur. Before he reached 13, like many in the area, his life was disrupted by the Japanese invasion. The family relocated to a rubber estate in Ulu Langat, Selangor. Later, they moved to Singapore thinking, erroneously, that it would avoid Japanese occupation. When Singapore was threatened, the family moved again, to India, leaving Yuson Loo behind as all non-disabled men were not allowed to leave. After that, the incomplete family decided to walk across the Himalayas to start a new life in China. However, the Japanese invasion of Burma unsettled the entire region, and the Loos remained in India. Loo continued his studies, and he learned Hindi and Urdu. His father rejoined the family while working as an engineer in the US Army. Kington Loo went to St Columbas High School until Junior Cambridge when the family moved to Delhi, during the great famine of 1945.

At war's the end, the family returned to Kuala Lumpur where Kington Loo started his Form Four at the Victorian Institution. In 1947, Loo finished his studies and joined the Government Commercial Day School where they learned typing, shorthand and book-keeping. His parents could not send him overseas for further studies, so Loo spent a year and a half in a civil engineering course at Technology College; Malaya had no architecture courses at the time. Loo's great-grandmother, Loke Yew, decided to finance his studies and he went to Australia to study architecture at the University of Melbourne. He excelled as a student and won the internal competition to design the Dean of Architecture's holiday house. The university now confers the Kington Loo Prize award to the best design student.

== Early career ==
Loo graduated in 1953, returned to Kuala Lumpur and joined the firm of Booty, Edwards & Partners (BEP), initially as a graduated architect and later as a full-fledged architect. He eventually became one of the partners in the firm. His architectural designs (together with the other BEP partner C.H.R Bailey) include the Dewan Tunku Canselor at the Universiti Malaya and the Subang International Airport. He also designed the first high-rise office building in Kuala Lumpur, the 13-storey Police Cooperative Building at Jalan Sulaiman. There are several of the firm's projects for which his involvement was singled out.

=== Rex Cinema ===
Loo designed the Rex Cinema, owned by the descendants of Cheong Yoke Choy who was one of Loke Yew's trusted lieutenants and nephews, making Yoke Choy, Loo's grand uncle. It is located in Kuala Lumpur's Jalan Sultan, was classicised art deco. The building burned down in the early 1970s and the renovation, done in 1976, seated 1100 with a single screen. The Rex became the first cinema in Malaysia to have a DTS sound system in 1993 in conjunction with the opening of Jurassic Park. The theatre was later converted into the Hotel Red Dragon, yet its history as one of Malaysia most important cinemas is still widely known.

=== Commonwealth Society Building ===
A branch of the Commonwealth Society was formed in 1961, supported by Y.T.M Tunku Abdul Rahman Putra Al-Haj, Malaysia's prime minister. Loo designed the building at no cost. The Commonwealth building was known for its unique Minangkabau style roof. The first phase of the building consisted of an entrance area and large lounge, a library-cum-committee room, and office on the ground floor. The first floor consists of a large lecture hall which accommodated around 400 people which is led by a broad staircase. The building's public rooms offered indoor activities such as darts, table tennis and billiards, and the entertainment programme also included films.

=== Subang International Airport ===
Work on the Subang International Airport started in 1961 and finished in 1965 at a cost of $64 million. Its deceptively simple design consisted of a roof composed of floating concrete shells that was held aloft by mushroom-shaped columns. Loo's business partner (in the BEP practice) and friend C.H.R Bailey designed the airport one of many collaborations that the two architects undertook in the 1950s and 1960s. The open structure also featured a massive circular ramp, reminiscent of Berthold Lubetkin's penguin pavilion in London. Most of the structure was removed during a major reconstruction in 1983.

=== University Malaya's Experimental Theater ===
The modern campus of the University Malaya included many significant structures, including the bulky Dewan Tunku Canselor Building. This building in turn included the experimental theatre. It was first open for its convocation ceremony in 1966, and Kington Loo is considered as the hand behind its design. The building's mark has always been its age and its ability to endure while adapting to changing times. The Dewan Tunku Canselor is an example for the brutalist architecture of the 1950s and 1960s, due to its bare concrete structure, use of egg-crate reinforced concrete and béton brut imprints on the poured concrete, which covers the entire building. The use of high grade reinforced concrete for the superstructure also means that the building is structurally very hardy. It caught fire on 29 June 2001 and the experimental theatre was not in use for a decade until the completion of a recent renovation. Although it was badly damaged by the fire, the building still maintained its main structure. The Theater was named a National Heritage site in 2009.

The experimental theatre had consisted of a classical theatrical plan with an arena stage and a proscenium stage. The theatre's trademark was a motorised arena stage, which at that time was the only one in Malaysia. The University of Malaya was the centre of an arts scene in the early seventies. The Experimental Theatre was once known as the premier avant garde venue for modern theatre including stagings of Naga Naga and The Crucible.

=== Private residences ===
In 1958, Loo designed his own bungalow house, known as Kington Loo's house. The house was located on Girdle Road, Kenny Hill, and some described it as resembling “a startled tropical bird”. The structure was made of timber and brickwork masonry, and sported a pitched roof which harkened back to Malaya's pre-war colonial traditions. Yet the house's unusual geometry and its V-shaped columns placed it firmly within the modernist tradition. In 1961, Loo together with C.H.R Bailey designed another ‘bungalow’, the Brunei house, the Sultan of Brunei gave the commission to Booty, Edwards and Partners with the stipulation that it be finished within fifty-five days. It cost $600,000 and it was awarded the RIBA Bronze medal. More of a “istana” that a bungalow, the mansion was able to breathe with its system of natural ventilation, that included metal grillwork, glass louvres, along with shading hoods, canopies and overhangs, and both vertical and horizontal fins. The Borneo house has a perfectly square floor plan with spacious verandahs on all sides.

=== Dayabumi complex ===
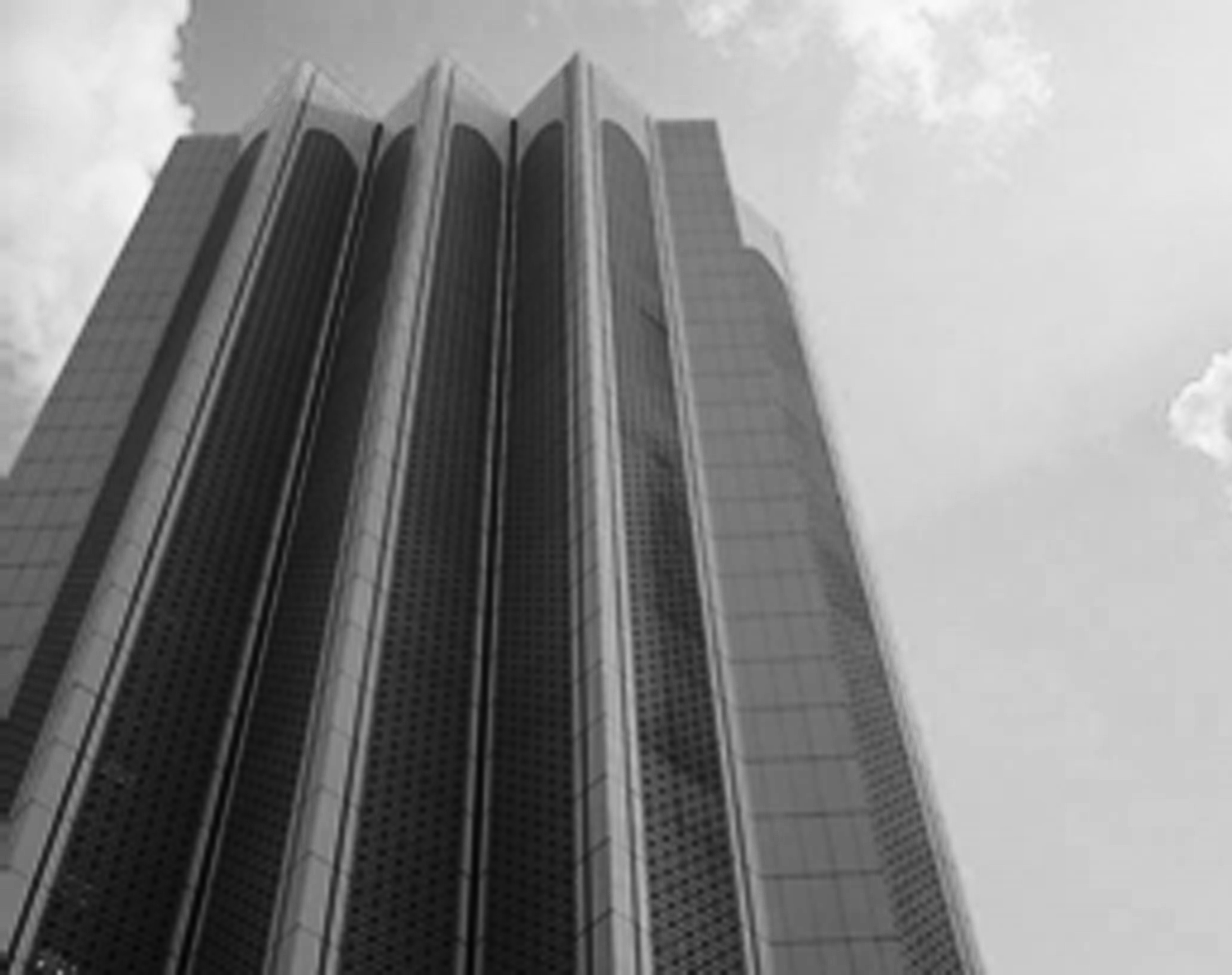
vertical building of Dayabumi Complex,2014

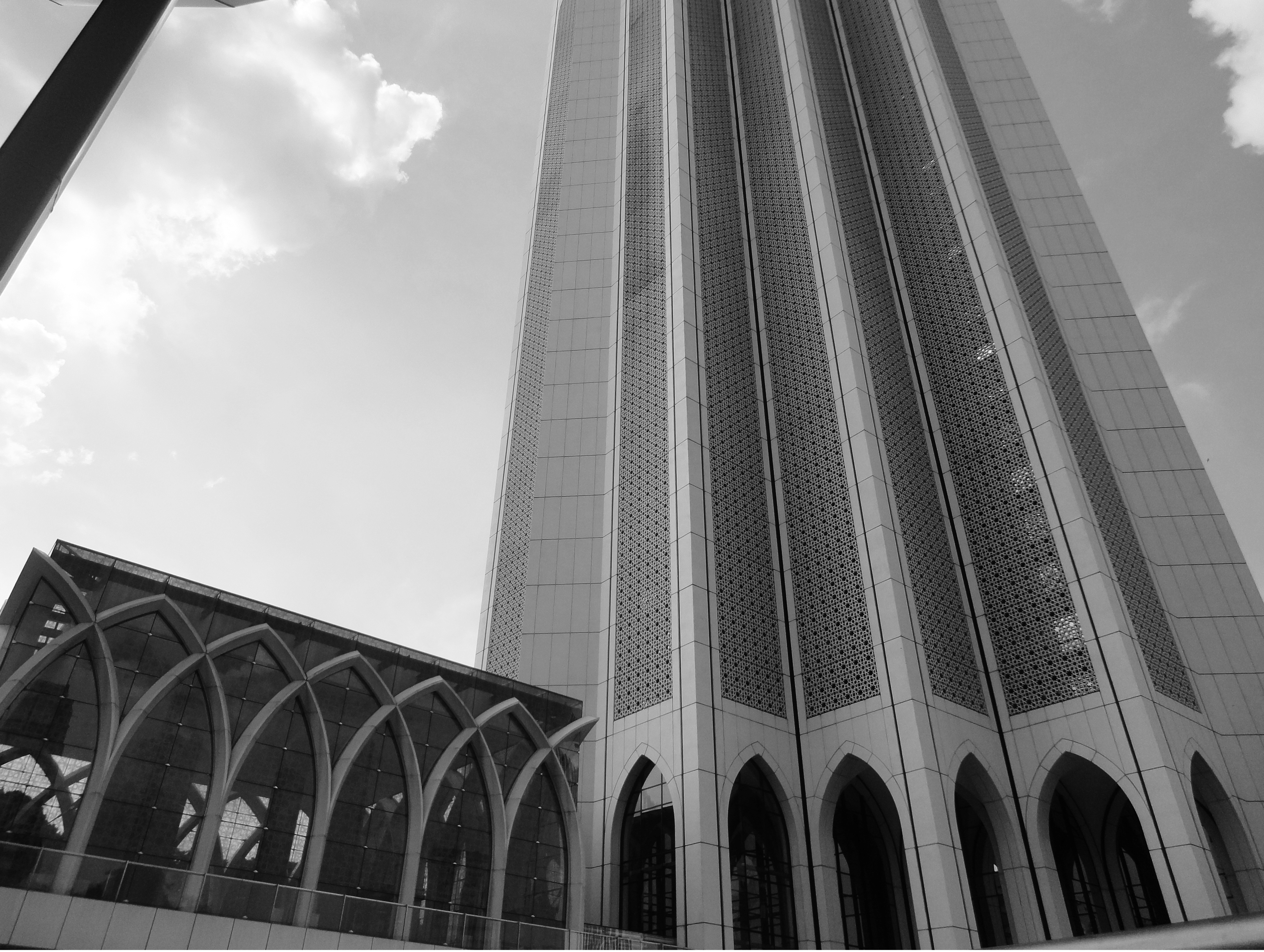
view of Dayabumi Complex,2014

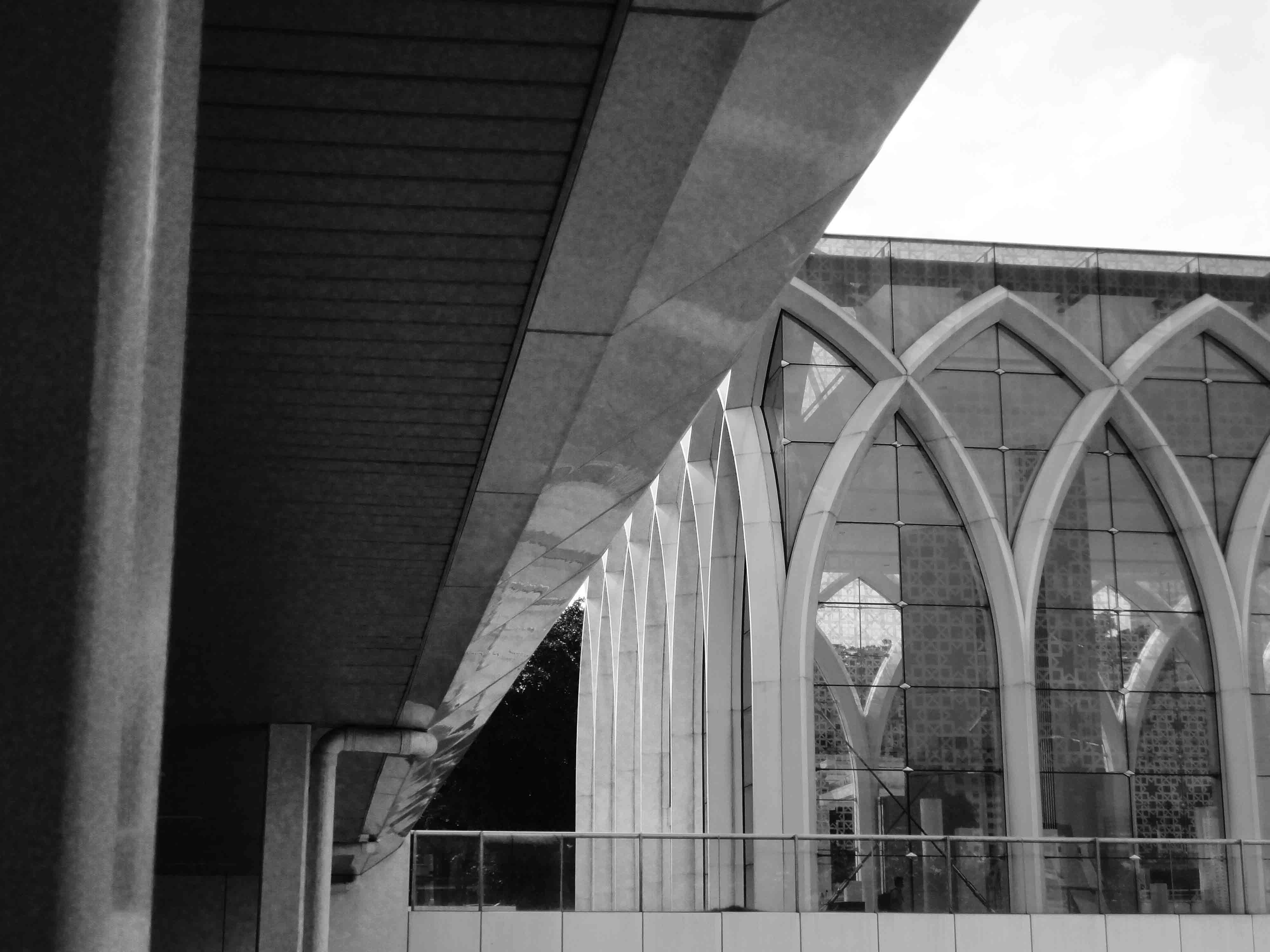
huge glass to trap more sunlight into the interior of building, Dayabumi Complex,2014

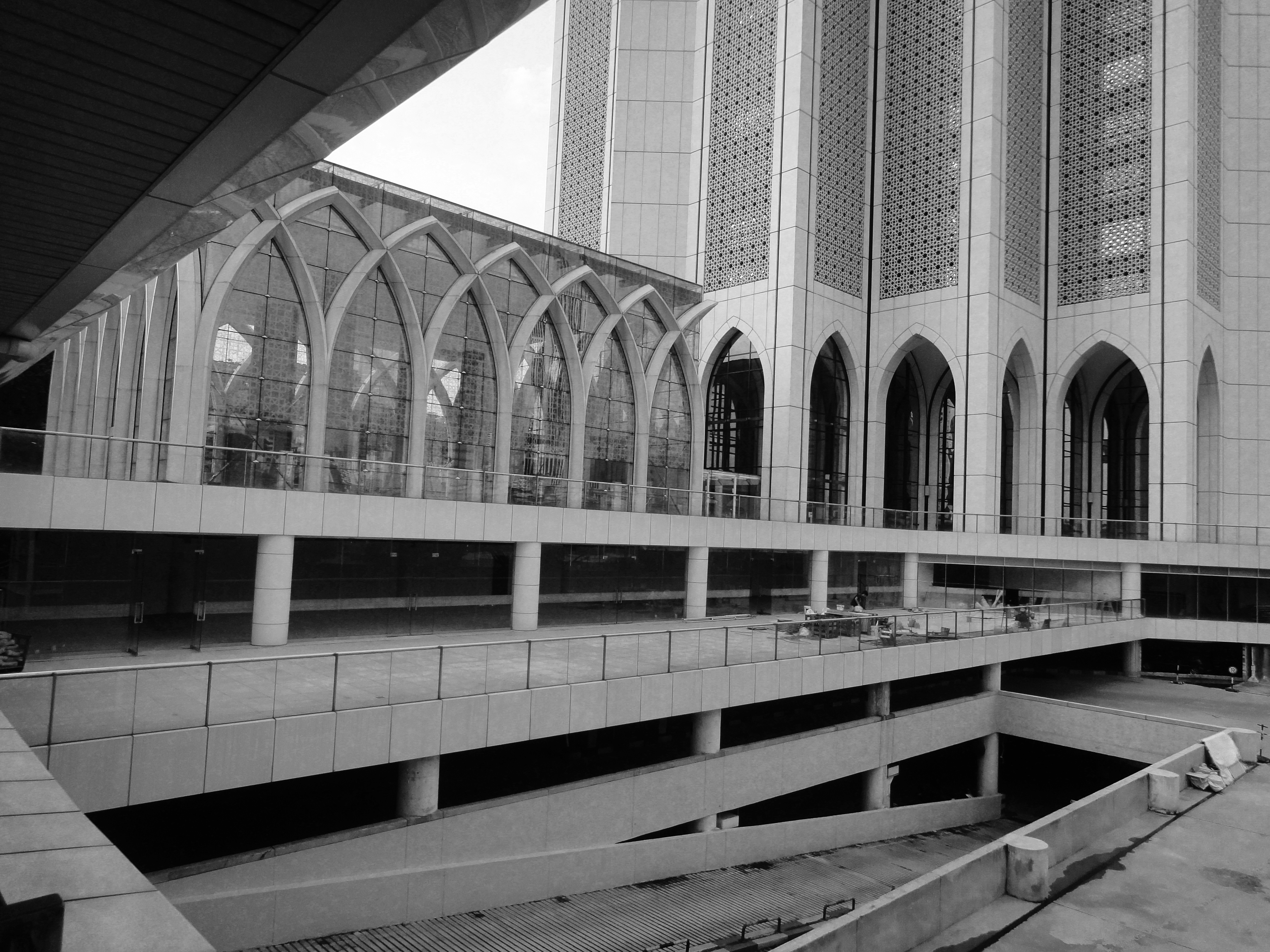
building under renovation, Dayabumi Complex,2014

The Dayabumi Complex, also known as Menara Dayabumi, was a 35-storey building located on Jalan Sultan Hishamuddin, Kuala Lumpur, Malaysia. It was completed in February 1984, and houses several commercial facilities. Although it was one of the earliest skyscrapers in Malaysia, it still remains as a famous landmark due to its architecture. It was designed by BEP (Kington Loo) as well as Akitek MAA, and owned by Urban Development authority of Malaysia (UDA). It represents a significant shift to the firm's design direction away from high modernism. The complex was built to resemble the decorative programs of a mosque, thus it displays features of several Eastern and Middle Eastern Islamic traditions, along with some Saracenic pointed arches, shiny white fretwork, as well as eight-pointed geometric stars.

== Professional practice ==
In addition to his activity as a designing architect, Loo was also active as an advocate for the profession of architecture he became the chairman of the Malaysia Institute of Architect Advisory Committee. He was an active man and he became president of the Selangor Club. He was a chairman of Bukit Bintang MCA.
In 1962, Loo was elected as the first local (non-British) president of the Federation of Malaya Society of Architects (FMSA) and he served as president until 1973. Loo sought to improve the practice of architecture with his service to numerous organisations. He was involved with many committees of the organisation that succeeded FMSA, the Malaysian Institute of Architects (PAM) and also the Board of Architects Malaysia (BAM).
In 1998, he was the first person to win PAM's inaugural gold medal, the highest honour the professional organisation has on offer. Furthermore, he assisted BAM in the revision of the Code of Professional Conduct and the Architect's Rules.

Loo donated his time and services to other causes as well. He displayed a strong commitment to the natural environment as he complained about the development of Kuala Lumpur that caused pollution in drains and river when he became the president of the Malaysian Institute of Architects (PAM). He was the chairman of the Malaysian Zoological Society, as well as the founding trustee of the World Wide Fund for Nature Malaysia (WWFM). During his time at Booty, Edwards & Partners, the firm contributed $20,000 to the Malayan Zoology Society. Additionally, he was passionate about the arts and served as chairman of the Malaysian Arts Council and he was on the working committee for the National Art Gallery.
