= Arthur Oakley Coltman =

English architect (1894–1961)

Arthur Oakley Coltman (A.O. Coltman) (1894, Edmonton, Middlesex – 1961, Cuckfield, Sussex) was an English architect practising in Malaya for 32 years where he worked as manager of the architecture firm Booty Edwards & Partners. He arrived in Malaya in 1925 and retired in 1957.

== Early life ==
He was on active service during the First World War before working in the Transvaal, and was officially listed as an absentee member of the Transvaal Provincial Institute of Architects from about 1931 to 1938.

He was responsible for many of Kuala Lumpur's greatest Art Deco structures, including the Clock Tower, OCBC Building, and Oriental Building. He also designed the Anglo-Oriental Building near Merdeka Square, which is now known as Wisma Ekran; the Kwong Yik Bank Headquarters and Lee Rubber Building, both on Jalan Tun H. S. Lee; the Rubber Research Institute, on Jalan Ampang; and the Odeon Cinema, on Jalan Tuanku Abdul Rahman.

Coltman died in Sussex, England at the age of 67 in 1961.

== Buildings ==
He worked on the buildings including:

=== Oriental Building ===
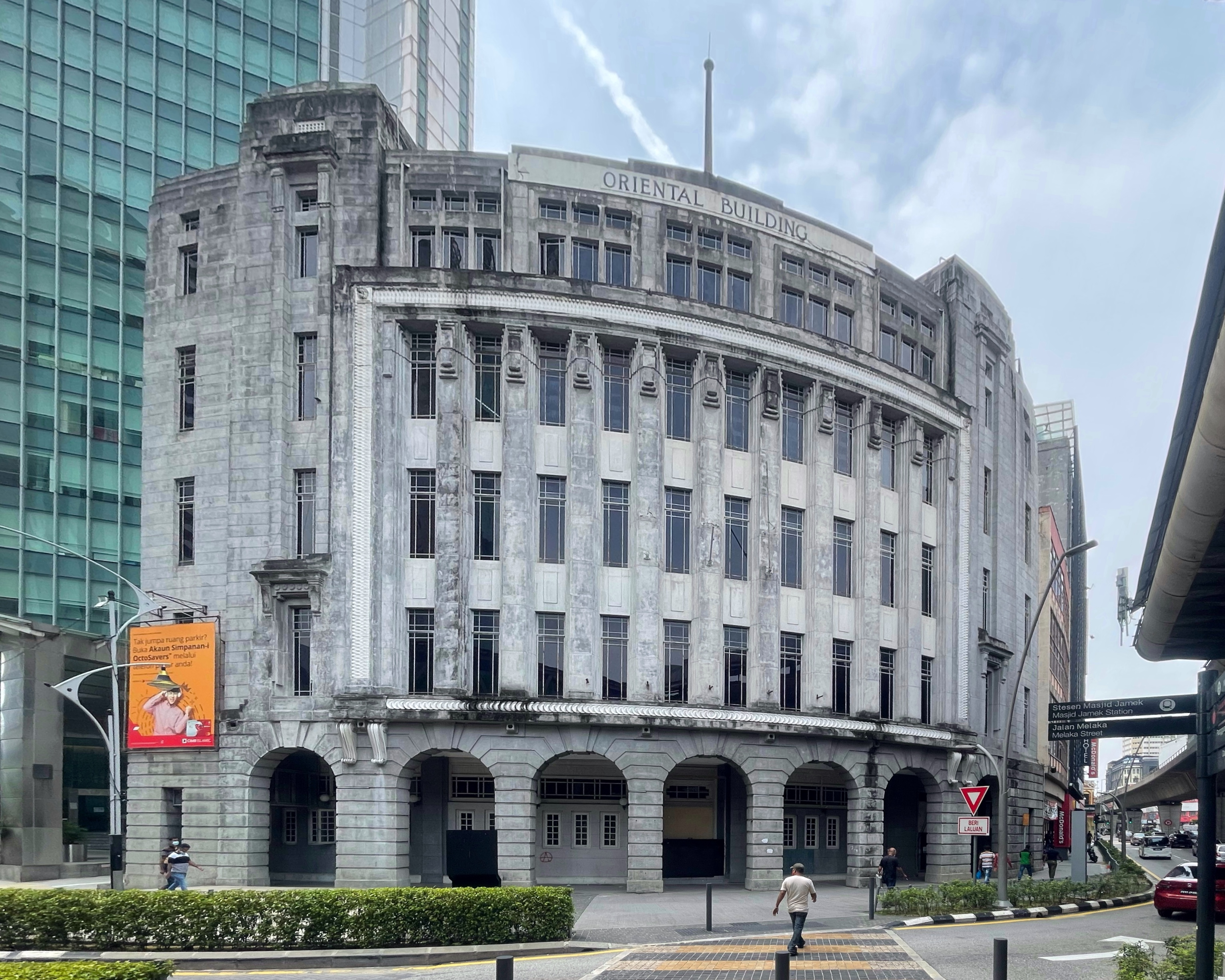
Oriental Building

Situated at Jalan Tun Perak (the former Java Street), next to the Masjid Jamek LRT station, the five-storey Oriental Building rose to the towering height of 82 feet and was the tallest in Kuala Lumpur. Originally called the Oriental Building, it housed Radio Malaya until 1968 and had 'Radio Malaya' in large letters on its façade. The Oriental Building also housed the High Commissioner of India, government departments dealing with the issue of trade licenses, as well as the Malaysian divisional office of the Life Insurance Corporation of India.

The building has a curved frontage. Between of the arcade on the ground floor is a central feature consisting of perpendicular piers running up three storeys. Around the central feature, which projects slightly from the frontage, is an acanthus leaf border worked in precast concrete. A white stucco frieze of interlocking discs frames the panel. There is 18,000 feet of floor space in the building arranged around an air-well. The ground floor was designed for retail. The central entrance and show windows had curved plate glass that had to be specifically made in England. Italian tiles were used in the floors throughout the building. The upper four floors, of which one complete floor was reserved for the Oriental Government Security Life Assurance Company, was used as office space and was reached by a lift and staircase at the side of the building. The basement was constructed separately, with windows fitted with sliding steel doors. The contract time for completing the structure was eight months, and the construction was to start shortly after late November 1931, with the architects reported as Messrs. Booty and Edwards, the contractors as Gammon (Malaya) Ltd., and Steen Sehested as the consulting reinforced concrete specialist.

On 19 September 1936, an earthquake in northern Sumatera in the then-Dutch East Indies led to tremors also being felt in the FMS, and caused damage to the building. It was reported that the third floor wall surrounding the offices of the Oriental Government Security Life Assurance Company cracked in many places.

=== Lee Rubber Building ===
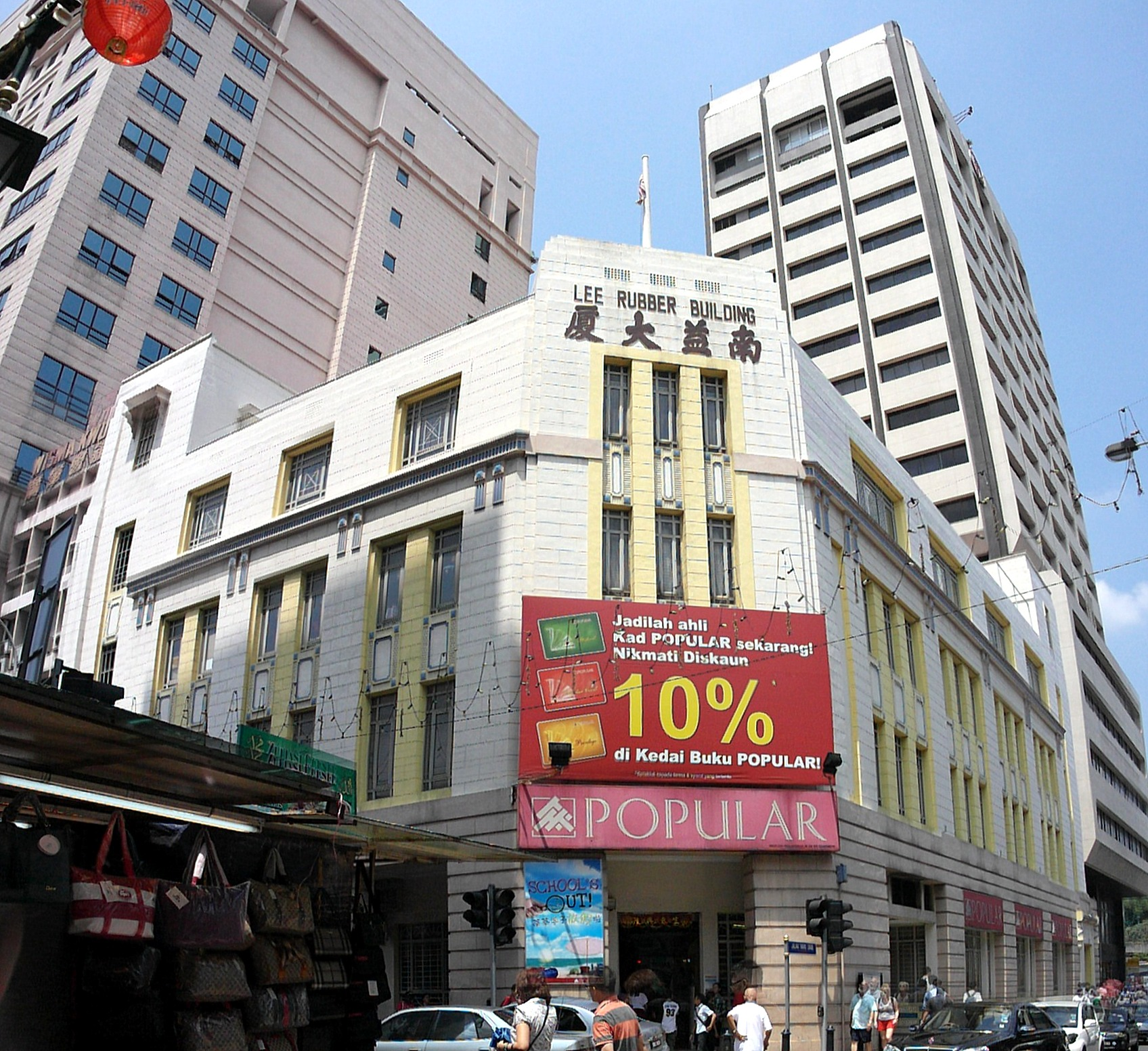
Lee Rubber Building

The Lee Rubber Building or Nan Yi Building (Chinese: 南益大厦) sits on a prominent corner in Kuala Lumpur's Chinatown. This four-storey Art Deco building was commissioned in the early 1930s by the Lee Rubber Company, a multimillion-dollar enterprise set up by Lee Kong Chian (1893–1967), a Chinese businessman from the southern Malaysian state of Johor who was known as the 'rubber and pineapple king'.

Located at the corner of Jalan Tun H. S. Lee and Jalan Hang Lekir (the former High Street and Cecil Street) in Kuala Lumpur, the Lee Rubber Building was the tallest building in KL when it was constructed. Modernist Art Deco rules this building with its striated lines and mouldings complete with differentiated corner treatment topped with a requisite flag pole. Its five-foot way is broken by solid wall-like pillars. It has a strong geometric shape that meets a corner set at a 45° angle. Like most urban Art Deco buildings, the Lee Rubber Building has a flat roof with no cornice or overhang. Its pediment still sports the original name, in English and Chinese.

During World War II, it served as the headquarters of the Kempeitai (Japanese Secret Police). Later, the building became one of the branches of the Oversea-Chinese Banking Corporation. Currently, it is the home to a branch of the Popular Bookstore, the Peter Hoe shop (selling local arts and crafts) and Kasturi Tuition Centre. Like most urban Art Deco buildings, the Lee Rubber Building has a flat roof with no cornice or overhang.

In 2016, the building changed hands and as a result the building was earmarked for development by its new owners. The building was vacated, but Kuala Lumpur City Hall by-laws forbid the demolition or significant structural alteration.

=== Odeon Cinema ===
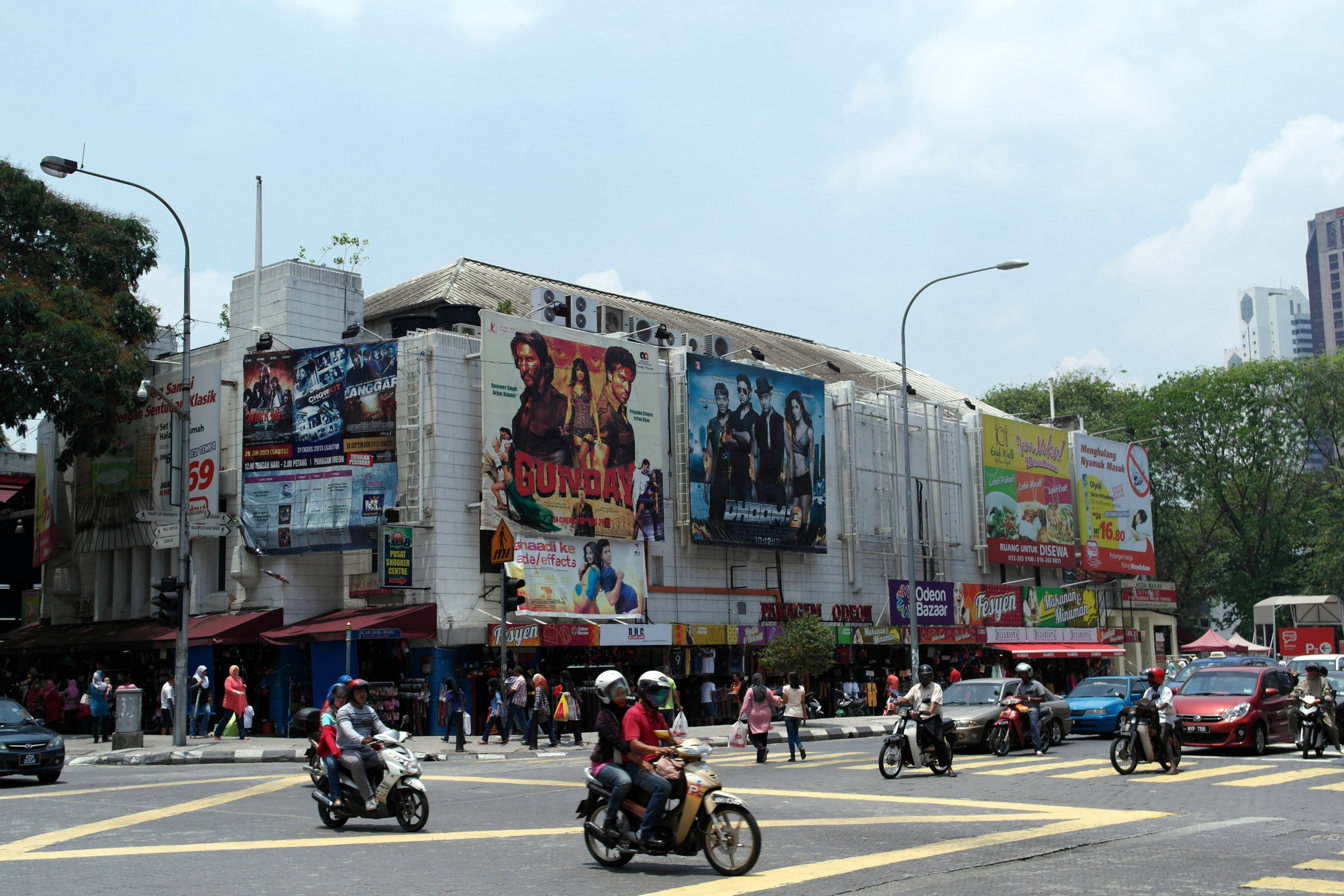
Odeon Cinema

The thematic link between the Art Deco style and the new entertainment industry was also evident in the design of the Odeon Cinema (Chinese: 奥迪安戏院) on the corner of Jalan Tuanku Abdul Rahman and Jalan Dang Wangi (the former Batu Road and Campbell Road) in Kuala Lumpur. The Odeon Cinema was constructed in 1936 by the Cathay Organization. The standalone Odeon Cinema is one of the last few surviving colonial buildings in Kuala Lumpur. It has undergone various changes. It was acquired by Antenna Entertainments and operated as a cinema again between May 2011 and March 2015.

Coltman was the architect and Steen Sehested prepared the reinforced concrete design. Initially the façade was coloured grey, green and white however it has faded. It was a product of golden age cinema with featured safety designs such as emergency lighting and fire prevention systems for the projector room. Ventilation grills and exhaust fans enhanced its air circulation. The foyers were laid with locally produced rubber flooring.

Art Deco elements include the lettering of the building's exterior signage, vertical pylons and flagpoles. Above the entrance, a horizontal beam, embellished with a mosaic depicting drama, comedy and music, intersects the strong vertical mullions. On the side façade, ribs create a vertical rhythm.

=== Clock Tower ===
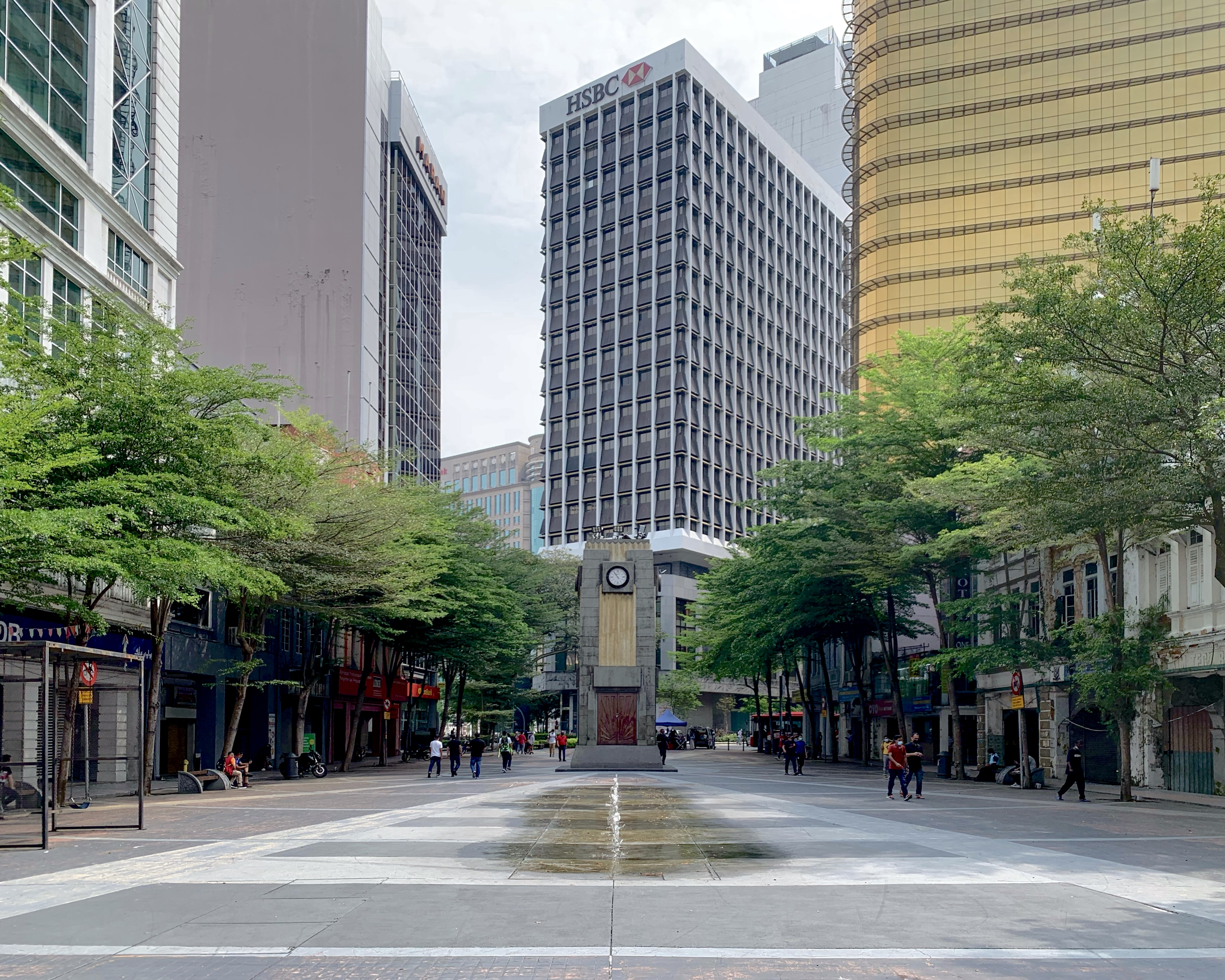
Clock Tower of Medan Pasar

Located at the Old Market Square (Medan Pasar Besar) near LRT Masjid Jamek in Kuala Lumpur's commercial centre, the Clock Tower is a distinctive architectural landmark. The tower was built to commemorate the coronation of England's King George VI in 1937. The memorial plaques were removed following independence. The sunburst motif is common in Art Deco design and is a prominent feature on the Clock Tower.

=== Anglo-Oriental Building ===
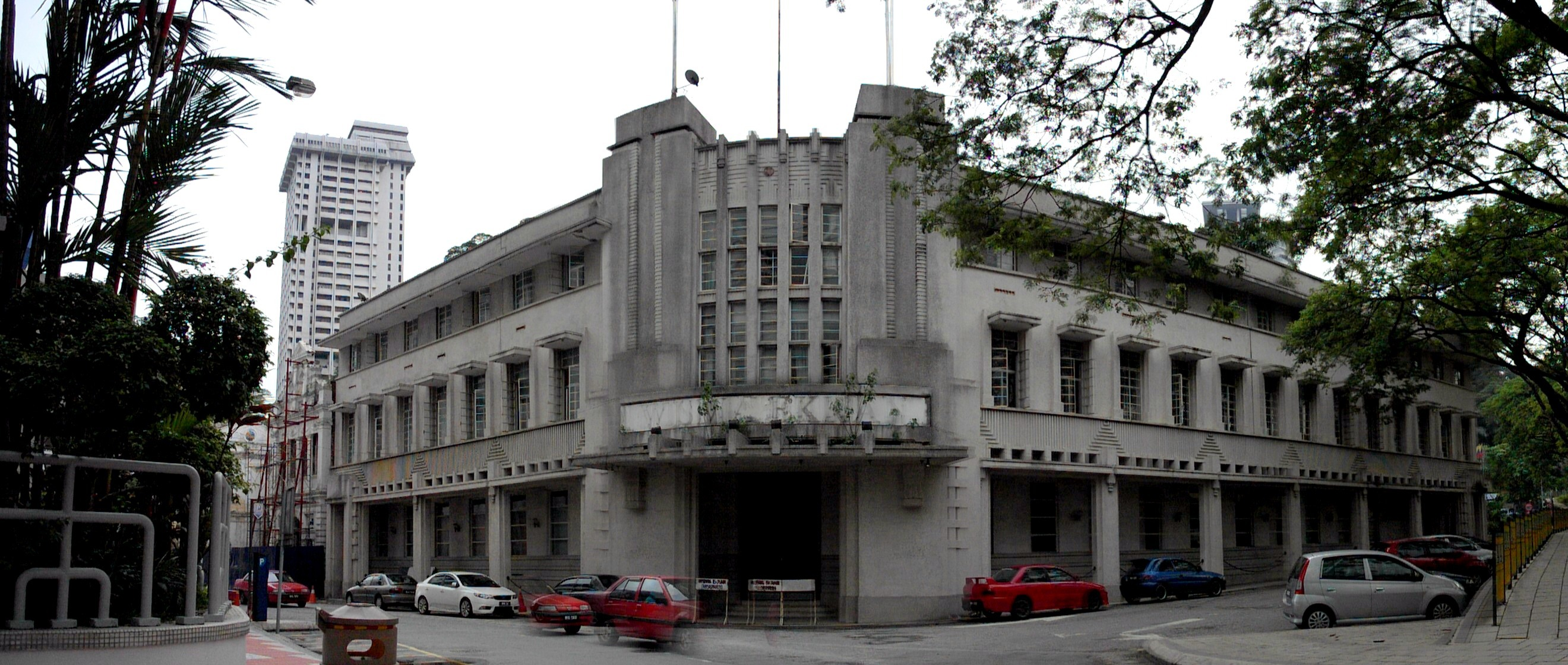
Anglo-Oriental Building / Wisma Ekran

The Anglo-Oriental Building was built in 1937 to house Anglo-Oriental (Malaya) Ltd., a subsidiary of the Anglo-Oriental Mining Corporation (later to become known as the London Tin Corporation), the general managers for a large number of tin mines in Malaya. It was constructed at the junction of Barrack and Club Roads (Jalan Tangsi and Jalan Parlimen today) in Kuala Lumpur, on the site of the former Empire Flats which had been home for many Europeans for years. The building displays a variety of Art Deco details, and represents a stylistic departure from the traditions of classical and British colonial architecture.

When constructed in 1937, the building had three storeys, with an exterior made up of reinforced concrete with brick panelling. The main entrance doors were panelled with hammered pewter – a white alloy that resembles tin. The company's name was executed in hammered pewter, another example of the architect using tin as a motif for the company. Dadoes for the staircase and entrance vestibule were made of a new material, Marbrunite, in multiple colours. A motor car garage was incorporated into the ground floor.

The Anglo-Oriental building has solid tower-like features flanking the corner entranceways in addition to vertical and horizontal Art Deco patterns and lines. The vertically banded front elevation of the building, which is held between two towers, contrasts with the horizontal bands of the two side wings. The tall, first floor windows of the Anglo-Oriental Building have individual concrete canopies, while the second floor is treated as a narrow band which appears to recede due to the deep, continuous overhang above the windows and the darker shade of Shanghai plaster. An internal open courtyard was roofed over for air-conditioning in the 1960s. During the 1941 Japanese invasion, the building was used as a police station. From 1986 to 1988, the architect Chen Voon Fee renovated the Anglo-Oriental Building and it was converted into Mahkota College, a private college partnered with Boston University. From 1995 to 2005, the Anglo-Oriental Building became a property of Ekran Berhad and it served as the corporate headquarters until 1 January 2005, where the second floor housed the principal place of business of the company. It was then that the present name – Wisma Ekran (House of Ekran) was established.

=== Rubber Research Institute of Malaya (R.R.I.M) ===
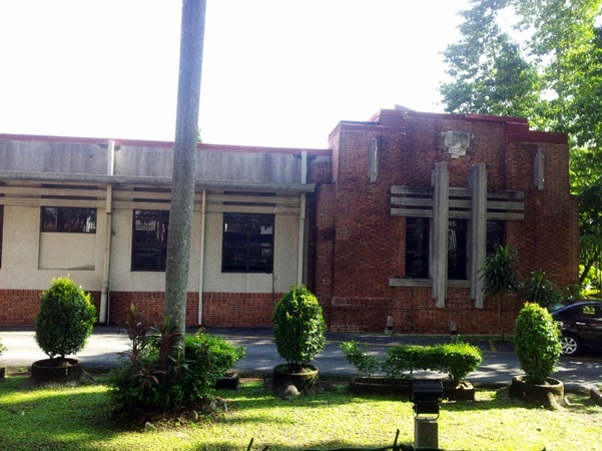
Rubber Research Institute of Malaysia

Although Art Deco is seen generally in individual urban buildings, in the Rubber Research Institute Building it is employed for a complex of linked, single-storey buildings set in a landscaped compound. The buildings are almost modular with identical facade elements. Unlike most other examples, these buildings are in facing brick, with monumental corner piers. These piers frame the window openings, which are divided into three vertical bands by two large, protruding plaster mullions. Three horizontal rendered beams appear to be threaded through these mullions, visually tying the piers together. On the flat, recessed brick pediment, a plaster motif of layered latex sheets hanging out to dry is a witty allusion to the industry these buildings serve. The buildings are grouped around green courtyards and linked by covered masonry walkways. The walkways have amusing spout details over the beams which throw the rainwater from flat roofs. Art Deco is continued into the interior on heavy, carved timber doors and steel roof lights. This building shows the inventive, even playful, nature of the Art Deco style.

The building was designed with a clean modern profile, and features covered walkways which border the central court and give access to all parts of the institute. This circulation feature connects the blocks of the sprawling single-storey building. The buildings are all made of brick and reinforced concrete with an exterior finishing of plaster and brick. The roof over the vestibule and the library is made of a special insulated glass called thermoflux. Protruding shades or eyebrows shade the glass block windows.

The institute's charge was to promote research into and investigation of all problems and matters relating to rubber. Prior to the establishment of the Rubber Research Institute of Malaya, there was no centralised location to co-ordinate and consolidate information about the material that played a central role in the Malaysian economy.

Early in 1926 a request was made to the Government of the Federated Malay States to locate the institute on Bangsar Estate (archaic – currently known as Bangsar) in Damansara Road, Kuala Lumpur. However, as early as 1929 it was felt that the buildings occupied by the Institute were inadequate as the institute's permanent home. The institute was subsequently relocated at 260 Jalan Ampang, Kuala Lumpur in the heart of the national capital on 14 May 1937. The new building is the property of the Institute and was erected at the cost of around $200,000. The foundation stone was laid by the fifth Sultan of Selangor – Sultan Sir Alaeddin Sulaiman Shah on 22 April 1936.

The contractor of the building is Bong Sin, with the consulting engineer as Steen Sehested and Coltman as the architect. The structure bears more than a passing resemblance to Frank Lloyd Wright's Imperial Hotel, Tokyo, in its details and overall layout. If this was explicit on the part of Coltman, it would be a most unusual apparition of Prairie Style in South East Asia, and an indication of the architect's ability to work within many stylistic parameters, a flexibility he exhibited throughout his long and distinguished career. Coltman is known for his role in establishing one of the largest firms in the area, and for his part in bringing modernism to the Federated States of Malaya, later Malaysia.

=== OCBC Building ===
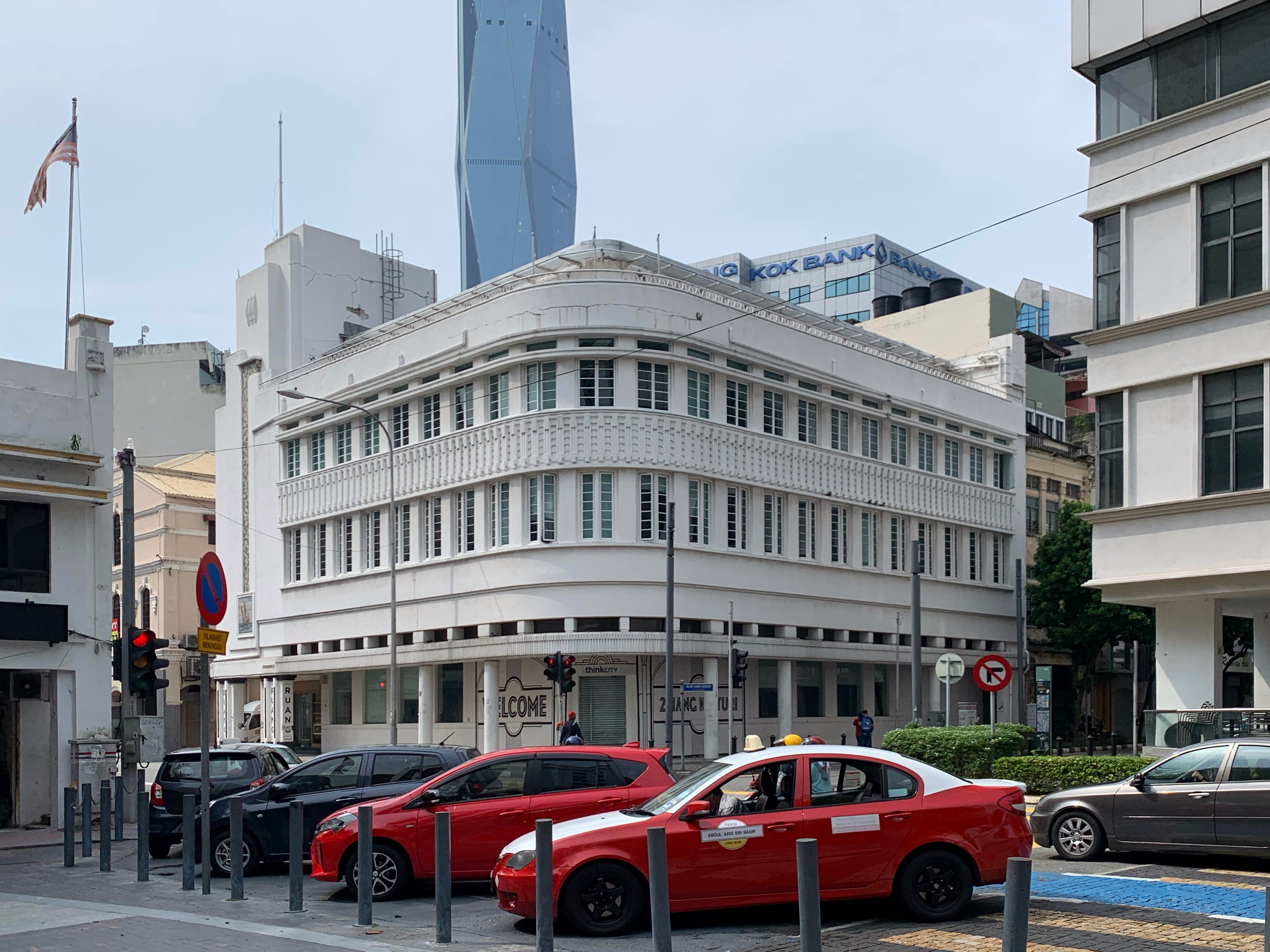
OCBC Building

This building was designed by Coltman and built in 1937 to house the headquarters of the Oversea-Chinese Banking Corporation Limited in Malaysia, and is a masterpiece of the Art Deco style. Located at the junction of Jalan Hang Kasturi and Leboh Pasar Besar (just behind the Central Market), it has the advantage of double frontage. The three-storey building follows the curve of the road. Unlike other Art Deco facades, the corner of the building is not accentuated due to the recessed entrance and the regularly spaced windows that flow across the facade. At one end is a tapering stepped pylon with a flagpole on top. A muted mosaic panel runs up the centre of the pylon. It included underground parking for bicycles. Internally, an interesting feature is an old elevator with brass and wood fittings and an oversized round window. The main OCBC Bank branch is now newly located at Jalan Tun Perak.

== Honours and awards ==
- 1953 President of the Malayan Association of Architects
- 1946 Order of the British Empire (O.B.E.) for service during World War II as part of the Passive Defence Service in Kuala Lumpur
- 1951 3rd prize in a competition for designing the new $2 million Post Office Savings Bank in Kuala Lumpur (B.M. Iversen won)

== Gallery ==
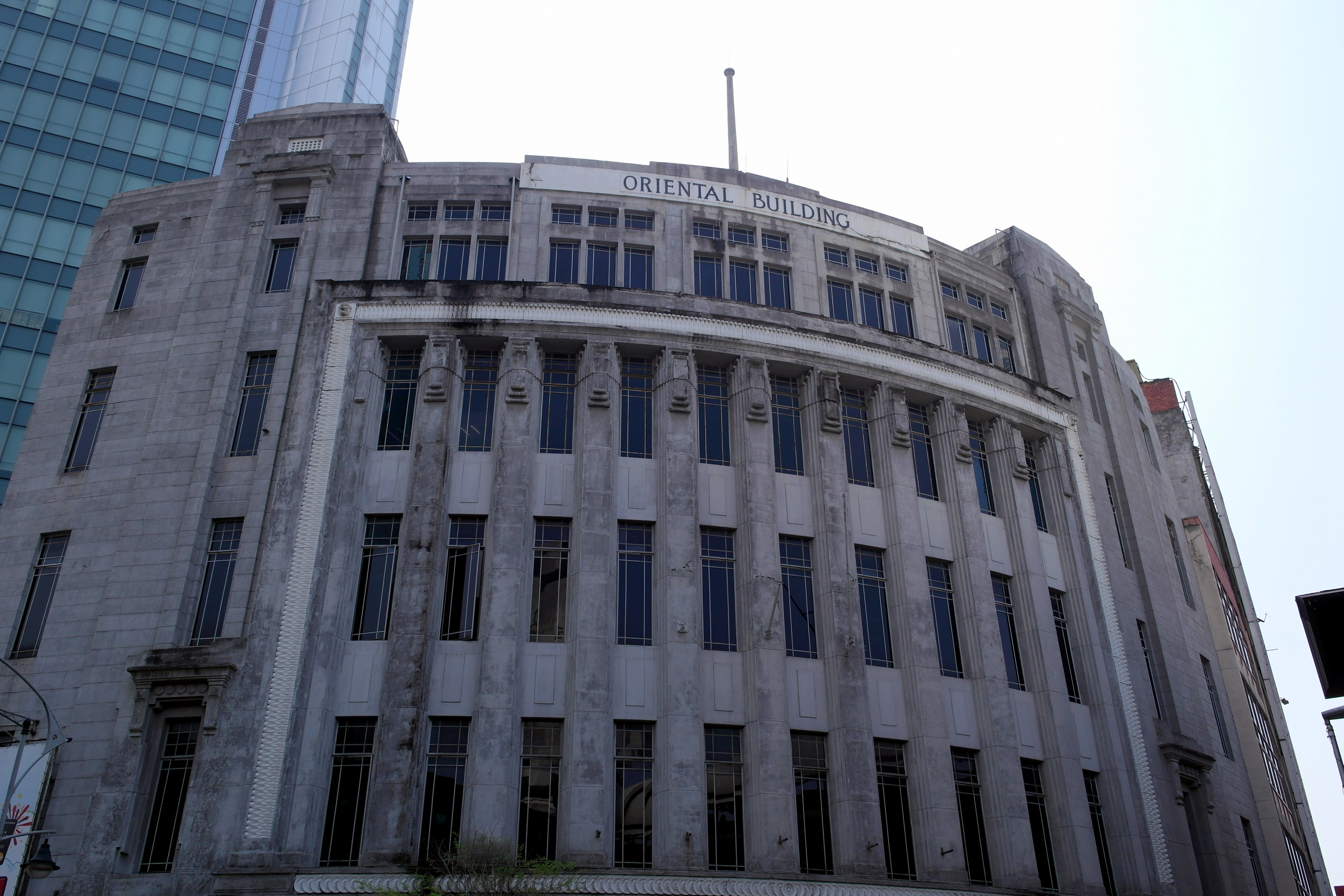
The central feature of the Oriental Building consisting of perpendicular piers running up three storeys

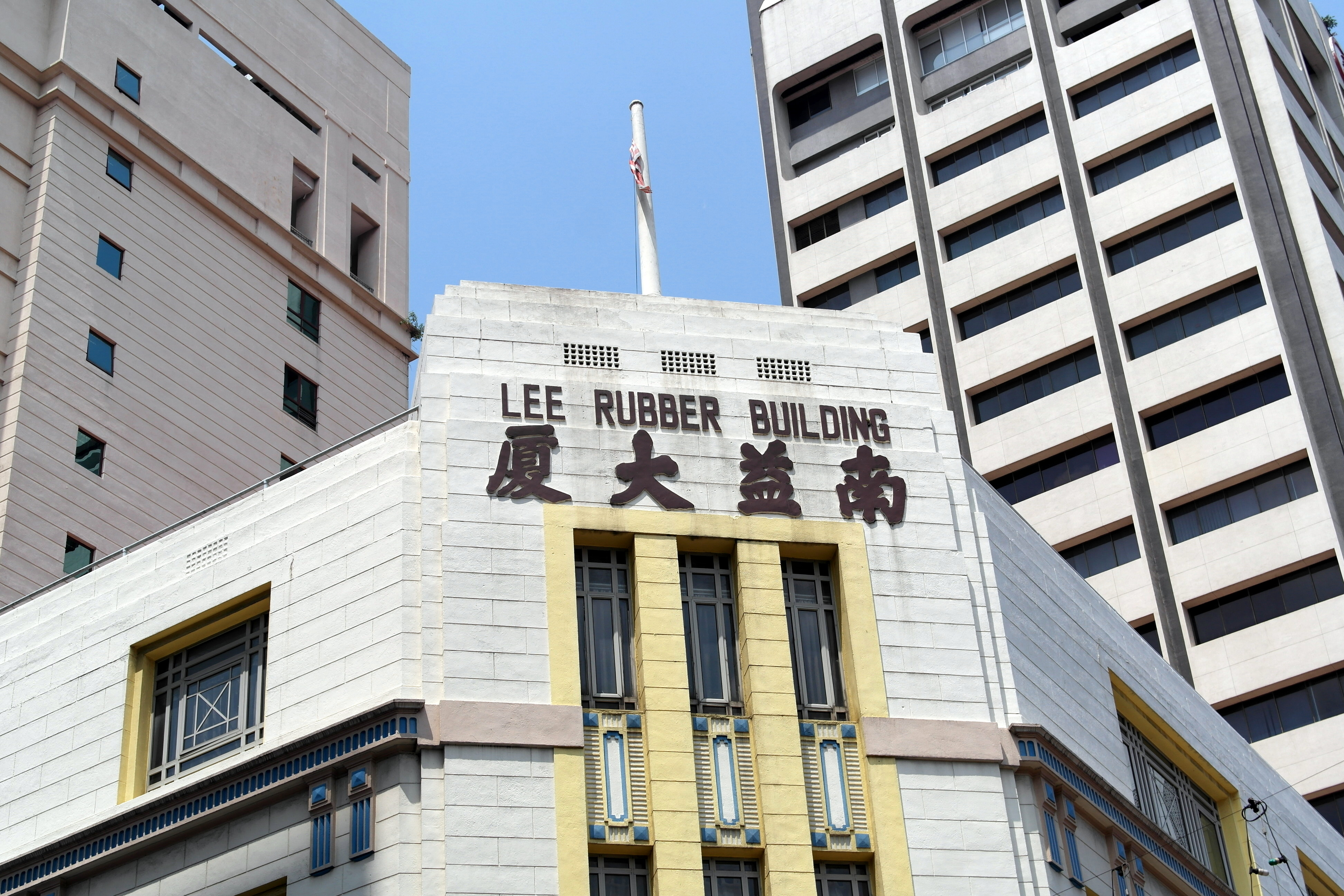
The Lee Rubber Building pediment still sports the original name, in English and Chinese

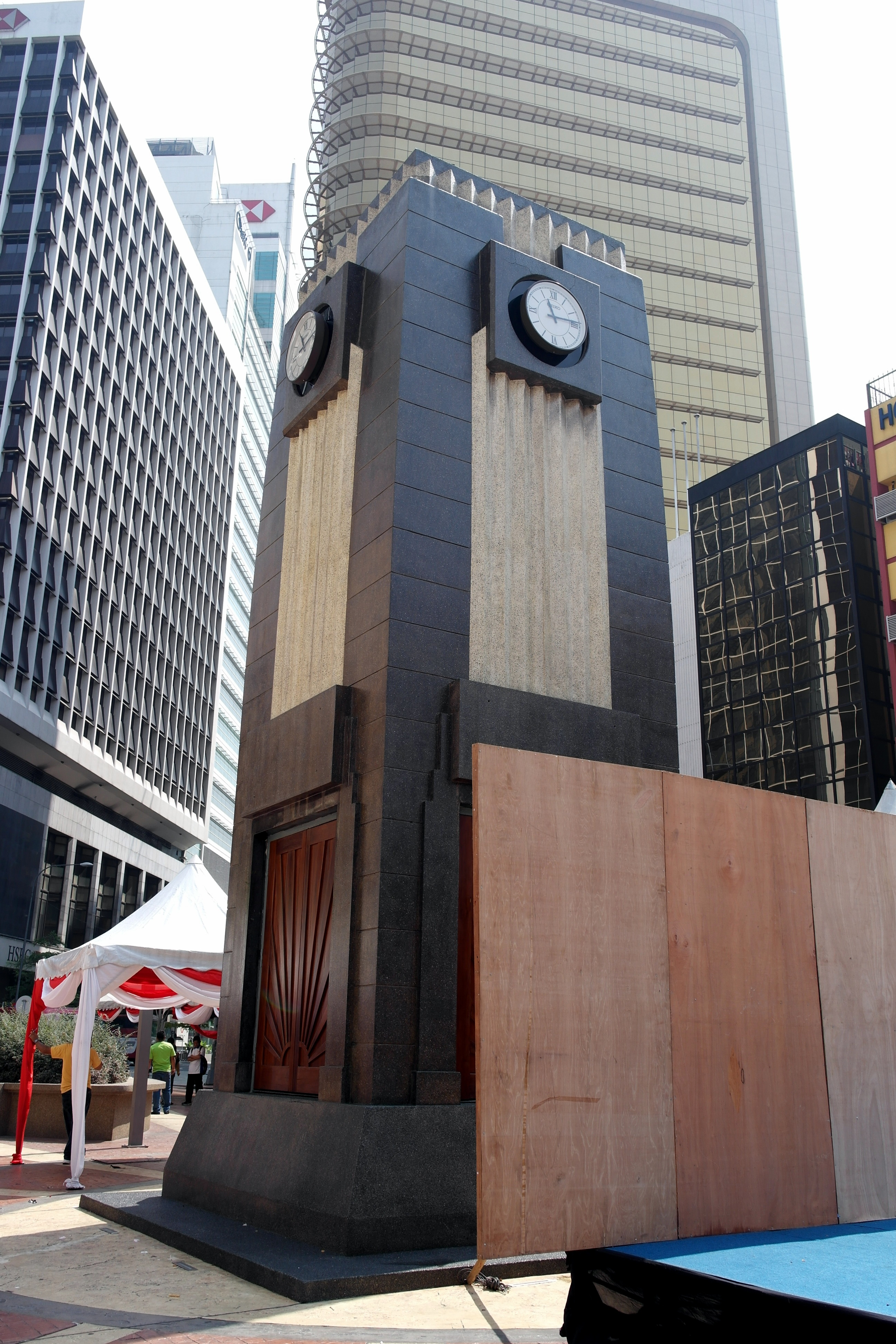
Clock Tower

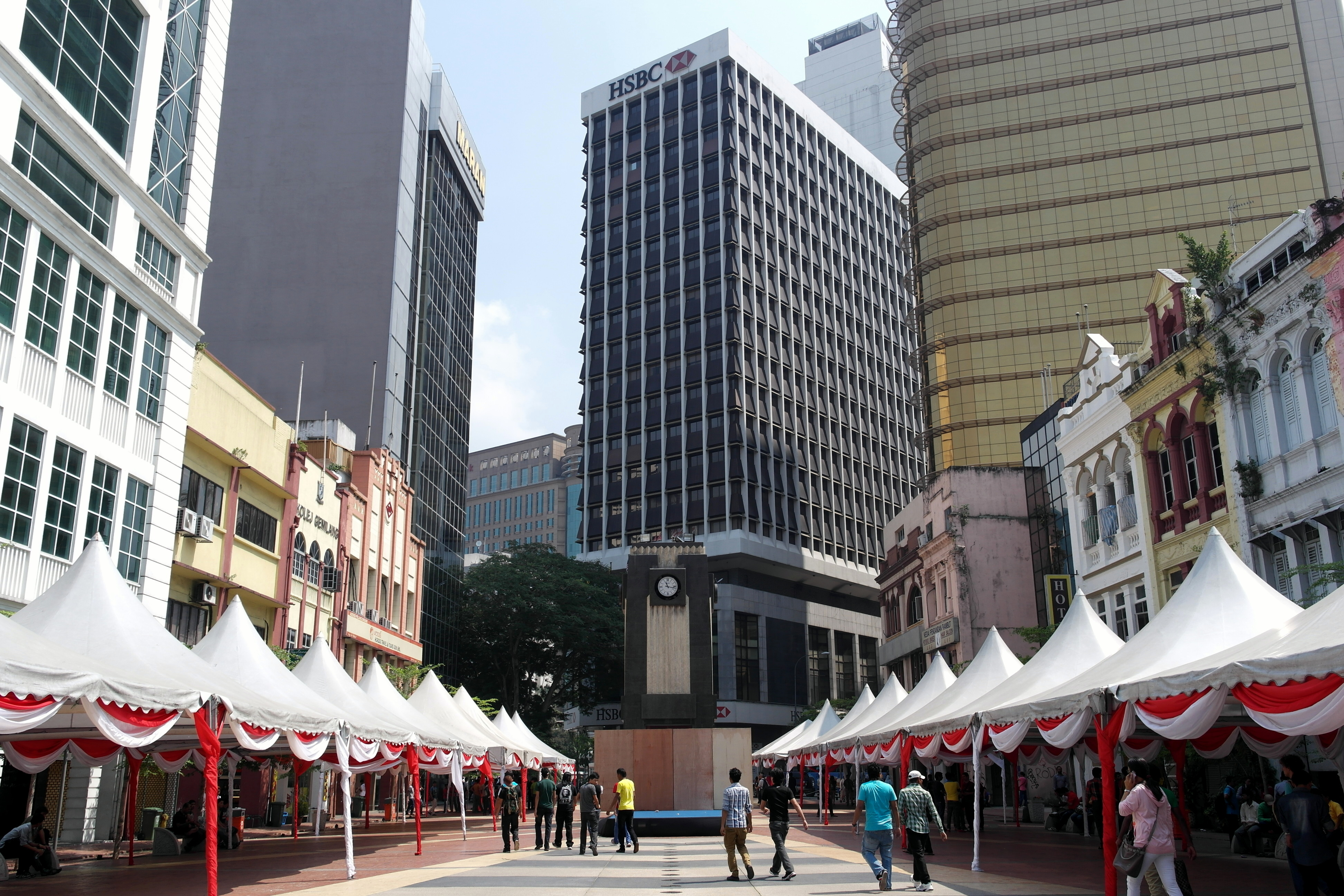
Clock Tower at the Old Market Square

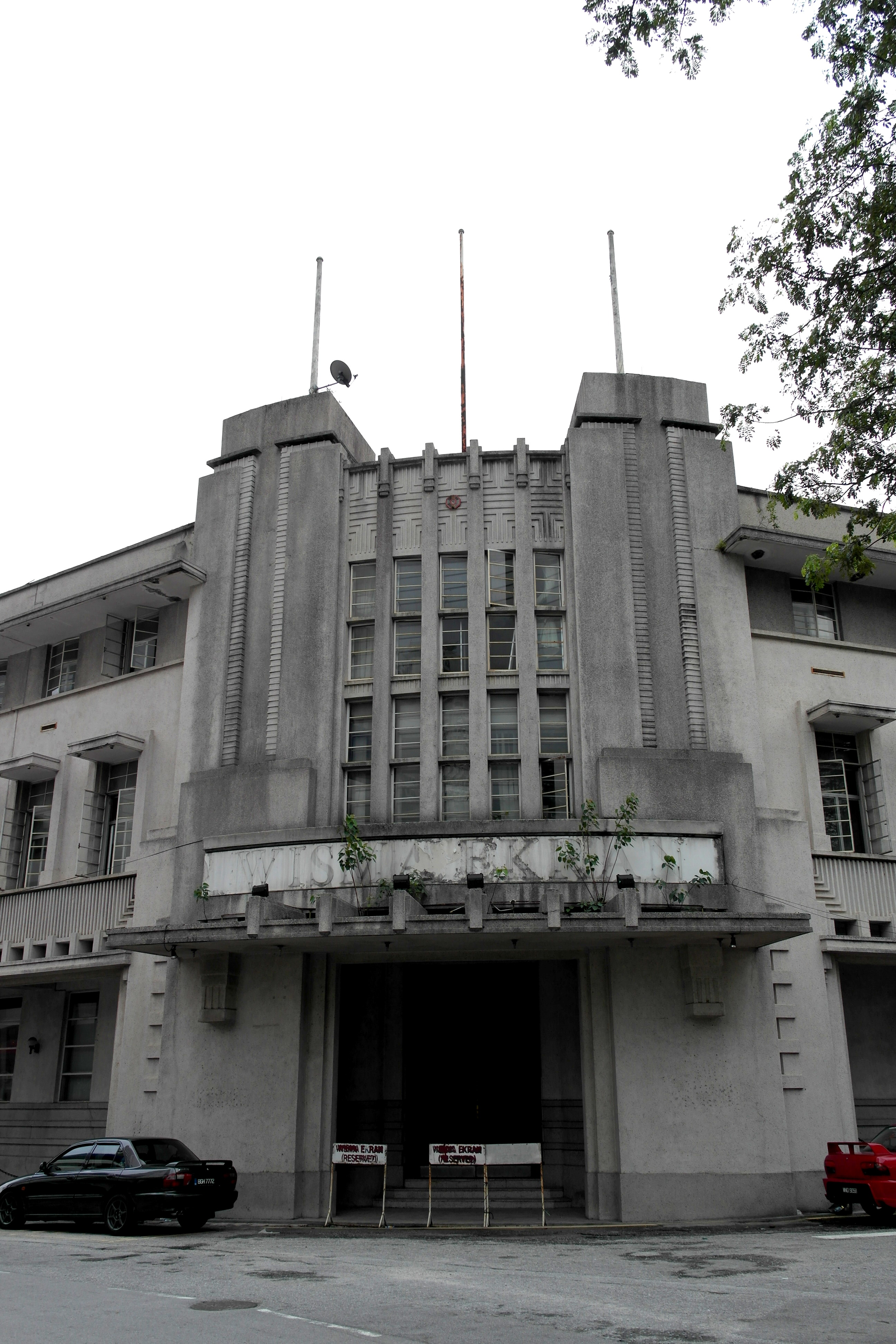
The frontage of the Anglo-Oriental Building

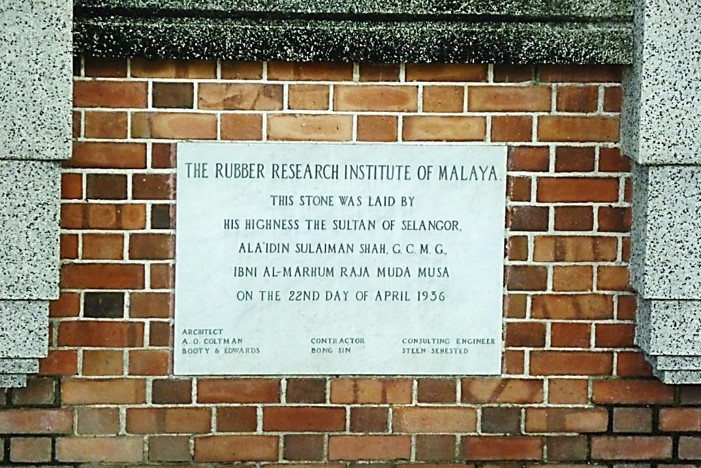
Foundation stone laid by the fifth Sultan of Selangor on 22 April 1936 at the R.R.I.M.
