= Malaysian Airline System Flight 684 =

1983 aviation accident in Malaysia

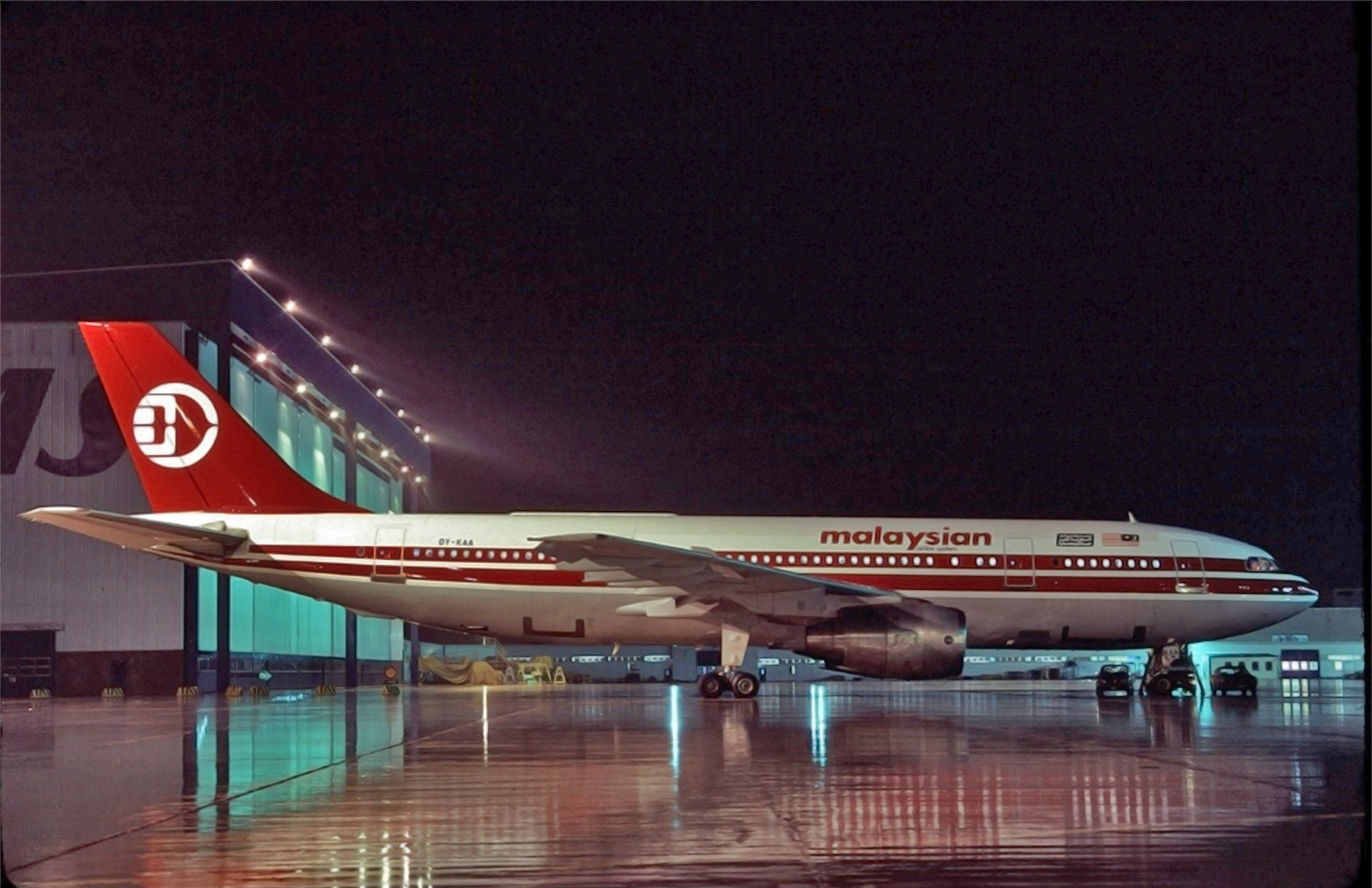
- OY-KAA, the aircraft involved in the accident, seen in October 1983

Accident
- Date: 18 December 1983
- Summary: Controlled flight into terrain caused by pilot error in inclement weather
- Site: Subang International Airport, Subang, Malaysia; 3°9′12.54″N 101°32′10.98″E

Aircraft
- Aircraft type: Airbus A300B4-120
- Operator: Malaysian Airline System
- IATA flight No.: MH684
- ICAO flight No.: MAS684
- Call sign: MALAYSIAN 684
- Registration: OY-KAA
- Flight origin: Changi Airport, Changi, Singapore
- Destination: Subang International Airport, Subang, Malaysia
- Occupants: 247
- Passengers: 233
- Crew: 14
- Fatalities: 0
- Injuries: 27
- Survivors: 247

Malaysian Airline System Flight 684 was a scheduled international passenger flight of Malaysian Airline System from Singapore Changi Airport in Singapore to Subang International Airport, in Subang (near Kuala Lumpur), Malaysia. On 18 December 1983, the Airbus A300 operating the flight crashed 2 km (1.2 mi; 1.1 nmi) short of the runway while landing at Subang International Airport. There were no fatalities among the 247 occupants.

== Aircraft ==
The aircraft involved was an Airbus A300B4-120, MSN 122, registered as OY-KAA, which was manufactured by Airbus Industrie in 1980. It had logged approximately 3907 airframe hours and was equipped with two Pratt & Whitney JT9D-59A engines.

== Accident ==
Malaysian Airline System Flight 684 departed Singapore Changi Airport on 18 December 1983 at 18:53 local time. As the flight approached Subang International Airport (now Sultan Abdul Aziz Shah Airport) in Subang, Selangor, Malaysia at 19:20 local time, it was cleared for an instrument landing despite poor runway visibility of 450 m (1,480 ft) due to rain. Airline policy required visibility of at least 800 m (2,600 ft), but the pilot assumed control from the first officer and began his descent. Furthermore, the air crew did not turn on the Instrument Landing System on the aircraft due to increased workload which was exacerbated further due to the different cockpit switch configuration between the A300 owned by Malaysian Airline System and that of the crashed aircraft, which was on lease from Scandinavian Airlines System.

The altimeter warning sounded and within 30 seconds the aircraft struck trees 2 km (1.2 mi; 1.1 nmi) short of the runway. The plane slid along the ground for 436 m (1,430 ft), skipped for 36 m (118 ft), and finally struck a stream embankment where it slid another 109 m (358 ft) before coming to a rest. The aircraft was still 1,200 m (3,900 ft) short of the runway and had lost its landing gear and both of its engines. All 247 occupants managed to evacuate before the fire destroyed the aircraft. The accident was the second hull loss of an Airbus A300.

== Probable cause ==
The probable cause was ascribed to pilot error in not monitoring descent rate during approach in instrument meteorological conditions (IMC) and continuing an approach below company minima without sighting the runway.
