= BEP Akitek Sdn Bhd =

Malaysian architectural firm

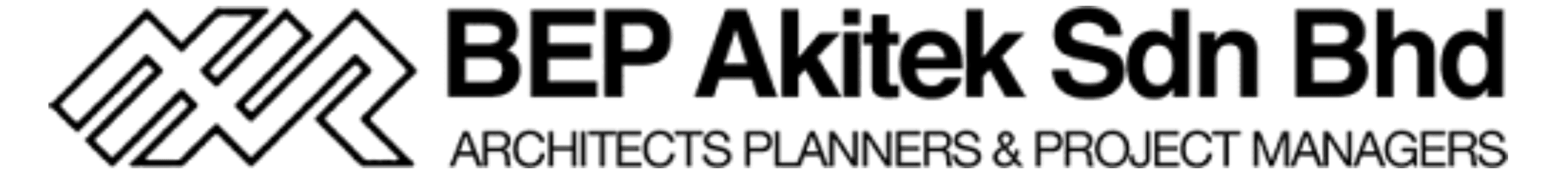
- Industry: Architecture
- Founded: 1923; 103 years ago
- Founders: Ralph Booty, Sidney James
- Headquarters: Malaysia
- Website: www.bepakitek.com

BEP Akitek Sdn Bhd (formerly as Booty Edwards & Partners) is an architectural firm based in Malaysia. Ralph Booty & Sidney James set up their practice in Singapore in 1910 and began the Booty Edwards & Partners firm on September 7, 1923. Ralph Booty had previously operated the firm Ralph Booty and Co. The new firm was first called Booty and Edwards.Arthur Oakley Coltman bought the firm in 1930. It was later called Booty, Edwards & Partners and the firm operated with offices in Colombo, Penang as well as Kuala Lumpur. In 1969 the firm was renamed BEP Akitek Sdn Bhd, the name it still carries. A major event in the firm's early history is when it won an architectural competition for the design of Colombo’s Town Hall and Municipal Offices, held in 1922. The Town Hall remains an imposing landmark in Colombo city. On May 24, 1924, the foundation stone was laid to build this magnificent building to house the Municipal Council of the country's principal city.

The firm became a major force in the development of Southeast Asia's architecture in the 20th century. It not only was responsible for some of the major governmental and commercial buildings in Sri Lanka, Malaysia, and Singapore, it also ushered in a new type of architectural practice: a major office run on the corporate model established by Skidmore, Owings, and Merrill (SOM), in the United States. Many of the major Art Deco and modernist buildings came from architects who worked in the offices of Booty, Edwards, and Partners.

== Notable projects ==
- Kuala Lumpur and Selangor Chinese Assembly Hall (KLSCAH), 1935 (3°8′21″N 101°41′53″E)

The idea with this project was to provide a governing building for the organization that would act as its centre of operations and cultural activities, and provide an architectural identity. The committee for the hall had existed since 1910 but officially came together in 1926. The size of the building is: 43 m (length) x 63 m (width) x 14 m (height) and is located at No.1, Jalan Maharajalela, 50150 Kuala Lumpur, across the Maharajalela Monorail station. Kuala Lumpur and Selangor Chinese Assembly Hall (KLSCAH) is designed following a neo-classical model. It is an architectural style that began in the late-18th century. Neoclassical works were a stylistic reaction against the Rococo style of florid ornament, although some of the building's features are Late Baroque, with certain classical and Palladian elements. The hall also shows the British colonial influence. The most prominent feature of the interior is a central hall with a high ceiling. The three entrances at the front relate to the significance given to the number three in Chinese culture, which means – man, earth, and the sky which balance out the universe. During its glory days, the hall was filled by the Chinese community that gathered for news, to participate in cultural programs or to watch stage performances. During World War II, it was a place where people sought refuge and aid, and later in the 1950s, after independence, members of the hall played significant roles in encouraging the Chinese community to apply for citizenship. In the early twentieth century, many Chinese retained a close attachment to mainland China and during World War II, they even collected money to fund China’s war against Japan. But after the war, the communities felt there was a need to change the perception of the Chinese community towards the then Malaya and to create sense of belonging. The hall played important role in this social movement. Construction of the building started in 1926 and it was completed only in 1935. The building has a touch of Asian architectural features with its dome and some of the detailing. The budget was 177,135 Malayan dollars.

- Police Co-operative Building Kuala Lumpur, 1959 (3°8′21″N 101°41′49″E)

A 200-metre walk away from the KLSCAH, the Police Co-operative Building, known today as Bangunan Koperasi Polis, is an experiment by the Federation of Malaya Police Co-operative Thrift & Loan Society Ltd. of investment in real estate and took into consideration the high demand for good office space in the fast developing federal capital. The building stands on a site of 17,000 square feet, and is bounded on one side by Sultan Suleiman Road and on two sides by Kampung Attap Road. It is a thirteen storeys high and comprises a basement, ground floor, eleven typical upper floors and a double storeyed penthouse . Reinforced concrete was used throughout the structure. The width of the typical floor plan was kept to a desirable minimum in order to obtain natural lighting conditions from the windows which are all placed roughly due north or south. The height of the building is approximately 155 ft. In order to reduce the sun's heat loads on the building all windows are shielded from direct rays by horizontal hoods and vertical fins. The construction of this building started in 1958 and was completed in 1959. The consulting engineers were Steen Sehested & Partners and A.C.Boon & Cheah Co Ltd as the contractors.

- Yau Tet Shin Market and Shopping Center, 1961-2002 (4°35′40″N 101°5′8″E)

Located along Jalan Cowan (now Jalan Raja Ekram) in the historical core of Ipoh, it was known to locals as 'Bat Kok Lau' (八角樓), which is Cantonese for octagonal building. The light weight concrete structure replaced an earlier market at the same site. The owner was the successful businessman, Yau Tet Shin. Construction started in early 1961, and it opened in December, 1961. Yau Tet Shin's son was in attendance at the opening. It was torn down in 2002; by 2015 a newer, taller building, known as One Octagon (in homage to the old market's octagonal shape), stood on the site. The cost was $475,000.

- Mercantile Bank, 1961 (3°8′48″N 101°41′45″E)

The Mercantile Bank is located on Old Market Square, Kuala Lumpur. It cost $4 million, and consisted of two floors below street level and 11 floors above. It is 144 feet high and has a total floor area of over 100,000 square feet. The whole upper part of the building is sheathed with a gold anodised aluminum grille which lent the structure a distinctive appearance. The grille was not only decorative, it deflected the sun’s ray and thus, in conjunction with heat-resisting glass, saved considerably on cooling costs. Marble paving and wall cladding gave an air of luxury to the main floors. The columns on the ground floor entrance foyer were black Venetian mosaic. The entry floor surface utilized white marble paving and was enclosed in glass and aluminum. The main banking hall featured white Italian marble floors and teak paneled walls. The entire building was air-conditioned. The plant for this, plus machinery for three fully automatic lifts, controlled by an intricate electronic “brain”, was on the roof. It is now occupied by Pacific Express Hotel.

- Wisma Angkasapuri, 1968 (3°6′50″N 101°40′14″E)

Designed by Ronald Pratt, an architect of BEP Akitek (Booty and Edward’s partnership). Built around the area of 33 acres and located at Bukit Putra, facing the Federal Highway that links with Kuala Lumpur and Port Swettenham. Construction began in 1966 and was officially completed in January 1968. It was inaugurated by 1st Prime Minister of Malaysia, Y.T.M. Tunku Abdul Rahman Putra Al-Haj at 17 January 1968 and named as “Angkasapuri”. Wisma Angkasapuri was functioned as a governmental building for ministry of information and television Department, headquarter of Radio Television Malaysia (RTM) which taking the responsibility of government to provide a broadcast service for free to benefit the people in Malaysia. The building was built in International style. Due to the climate of Malaysia, international style in Malaysia has liberally using shading panels, grilles and louvers instead of the ‘Basic form’ of international style in Europe and America during the pre and post-war period to cope with the local climate and keep the building cooler. In the post-independence period, most of the buildings in Kuala Lumpur had strongly using symbolism and boldness to create a nationalistic image. The shape of the shading panels of Wisma Angkasapuri was literally inspired from the shape of horseshoe crab and the shield of warrior which symbolize defensive, strong, protection and status.

== Other notable works ==
- Omar Ali Saifuddien Mosque, Brunei (1958)
- Wisma Hamzah Kwong-Hing, Lebuh Ampang, Kuala Lumpur (1958)
- EPF Building, Federal Highway, Petaling Jaya (1962)
- Guinness Factory, Seri Setia, Petaling Jaya (1965)
- Colgate-Palmolive Factory, Jalan Semangat, Petaling Jaya (1965)
- Church of the Good Shepherd, Taman Ayer Panas, Setapak (1964)
- Lapau, Brunei (1968)
- Wisma Damansara, Jalan Semantan, Kuala Lumpur (1970)
- Crowne Plaza Hotel, Jalan Sultan Ismail, Kuala Lumpur (1972-2014)
- General Post office, Kuala Lumpur (1984)
- Dayabumi Tower, Kuala Lumpur 1985
- Kuala Lumpur Rubber Research Institute, Jalan Ampang (1936)
