= List of Malaysian architects =

Following is a list of notable architects from Malaysia

== A–M ==
- C.H.R Bailey
  - Great Hall and Admin building University of Malaya
  - Kuala Lumpur International Airport at Subang
  - St Joseph's Cathedral, Kuching
  - Chartered Bank Building HQ Kuala Lumpur
  - Supervising Architect and design of the Dome Minaret and Lagoon of Omar Ali Saifuddien Mosque Brunei
  - Parliament Buildings Brunei
  - Mercantile Bank HQ Kuala Lumpur
  - Sungei Pari Towers (Ipoh, Malaysia)
- E. S. COOKE
- Howard Ashley
  - National Mosque of Malaysia (Malaysia)
  - Federal Building of Petaling Jaya (Malaysia)
- Arthur Oakley Coltman (1894-1961)
  - Anglo-Oriental Building (Kuala Lumpur)
  - Clock Tower (Kuala Lumpur)
  - Lee Rubber Building (Kuala Lumpur)
  - Odeon Cinema (Kuala Lumpur)
  - Oriental Building (Kuala Lumpur)
  - Rubber Research Institute of Malaya (Kuala Lumpur)
  - Sultan Omar Ali Saifuddin Mosque (Brunei)
- Kenneth Cavendish Duncan
  - British Council Building, Kuala Lumpur
  - Maternity Hospital, Kuala Lumpur Hospital
- Goh Hock Guan (1934-2018)
- Hijjas Kasturi (born 1936)
  - Menara Maybank (Malaysia)
  - Menara Telekom (Malaysia)
  - Tabung Haji (Malaysia)
  - Putrajaya Convention Centre (Malaysia)
  - Shah Alam Stadium (Malaysia)
- Arthur Benison Hubback (1871-1948)
  - Ipoh railway station (Malaysia)
  - Kuala Lumpur Railway Station
  - Masjid Jamek (Malaysia)
  - Post Office (Malaysia)
  - Royal Selangor Club (Malaysia)
  - Ubudiah Mosque (Malaysia)
- Berthel Michael Iversen (1906-1976)
  - Cathay Cinema (Ipoh)
  - Denmark House (Kuala Lumpur)
  - Lido Cinema (Ipoh)
- P.H. Keyes
  - Hotel Majestic (Kuala Lumpur, Malaysia)
- T.Y. Lee
  - Central Market
  - Mimaland
- Yoon Thim Lee (1905-1977)
  - Al-Rahman Mosque, University of Malaya (Malaysia)
  - Federal Hotel, Kuala Lumpur (Malaysia)
  - Chin Woo Stadium, Kuala Lumpur (Malaysia)
  - Chinese Maternity Hospital (Malaysia)
  - East Asia Building (Malaysia)
  - Methodist Boys School - Sentul: addition
  - Kampung Baru Mosque (Malaysia)
  - UMNO Building
- Kington Loo (1930-2003)
- S.P.C. Merer
  - Federal Building of Petaling Jaya (Malaysia)
  - Kuala Lumpur International Airport (Malaysia)

== N–Z ==
- Arthur Charles Alfred Norman (1858-1944)
  - Government Printing Office
  - High Court Building (Malaysia)
  - Sultan Abdul Samad Building
- Ken Yeang (born 1948)
  - Menara Mesiniaga (Malaysia)
  - National Library, Singapore (Singapore)
- Nik Mohamed Mahmood
- Karthikeyan G (1949-2015)
- Sarly Adre Sarkum (born 1975)
- Tan Loke Mun (born 1965)
  - S11 house (Malaysia)
- Thomas A.S. Tiang
  - Ampang Park (Malaysia)
  - Pertama Shopping Complex (Malaysia)
  - Pudu Plaza Malaysia (Malaysia)
- Ar. Teo Ah Khing, Teo A. Khing Design Consultants (TAK) (Malaysia)
  - Dubai Meydan City (UAE)
  - Meydan Racecourse (UAE)
  - Meydan Hotel (UAE)
  - Masterplan of Federal Administration of Putrajaya (Malaysia)
  - Palm Deira of Dubai Islands (UAE)
  - Palm Jebel Ali Masterplan (UAE)
  - Kenyalang Smart City (Malaysia)
  - Miri City Fan (Malaysia)
  - Curtin University Malaysia Phase 2 (Malaysia)

== See also ==
- Architecture of Malaysia
- List of architects
- List of Malaysians
