= T. Y. Lee =

Malaysian architect

T.Y. Lee
- Born: Malaysia
- Known for: Architecture

T.Y. Lee was an architect in Malaysia who played a significant role in the country's architectural development from the 1930s through the 1980s. He was the founder of T.Y. Lee and Sons Architect. T.Y. Lee was the architect of record for the Central Market, the finest Art Deco building in Kuala Lumpur that dates to 1936. Lee's work then shifted in a modern direction, and he created an apartment block that was among the city's most prestigious addresses. T.Y Lee didn't make one but two prestigious apartment blocks in the 1960s. These two were called Blue Boy mansion (1962) and Marble Jade mansion (1963) respectively. His swan song came in the 1980s when he consulted on Mimaland, Malaysia's first theme park, a hospitality venture that brought a Disney-style theme park to Southeast Asia.

== Central Market ==
Central Market, Kuala Lumpur began life as a wet market in 1888 for Kuala Lumpur citizens and tin miners. It was built by Yap Ah Loy, the city's Chinese Kapitan. When the market continued to expand, a permanent structure was built to house all the vendors. In 1900, a permanent single-storey structure was erected to house all vendors under one roof. By the 1930s the structure was further improvised to the current façade.

T.Y Lee was the designer and architect of the original Central Market in 1936. A contract sum of $249,000.00 was bid for this project and it was awarded to the contractor Brizary & Co. from Singapore. However, the cost increased to $330,000.00 after realizing the additional Art Deco detailing. The project was completed in 1937 and was used for wholesale and retail sales until the end of 1970s.

The Central Market is one of the living examples of South East Asian Art Deco Architecture that is still well preserved and serving its original function. Art Deco is an influential visual arts design style introduced in France after World War I. Art Deco represented luxury, glamour, exuberance and faith in social and technological progress. Therefore, the bold ancient architectural design such as ziggurats and pyramid are often employed in Art Deco.

== Blue Boy Mansion ==
Blue Boy Mansion is a seven-storey residential building and was built in 1962, located in Jalan Tong Shin, Kuala Lumpur. Funded by Hong Kong investor and built by Architect T.Y.Lee & Sons. It was built for mostly wealthy Chinese clients based in Kuala Lumpur. It is a resolutely modern apartment block. It consists of two rectangular courtyards, with shop lots on the ground floor perimeter, and a roof terrace. All apartments have cross ventilation, with views to the outside and to the courtyards. Perched atop a hill in Bukit Bintang, the upper floors enjoy panoramic views of the city. The architect's offices were located in the structure. The architect ran his office from the prestigious address. His later client, the Magnum Corporation, were also tenants.

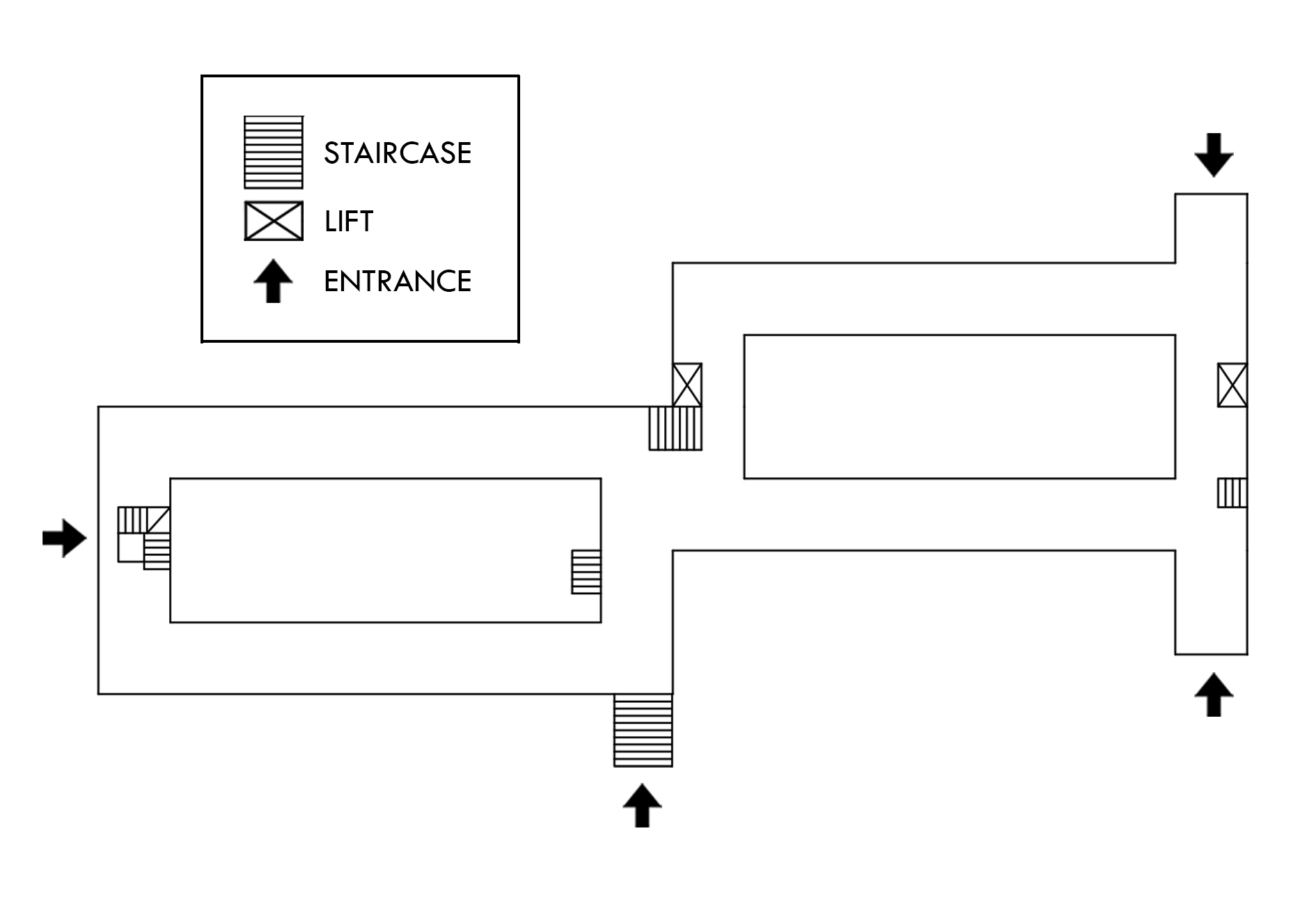
Layout Plan for Blue Boy Mansion

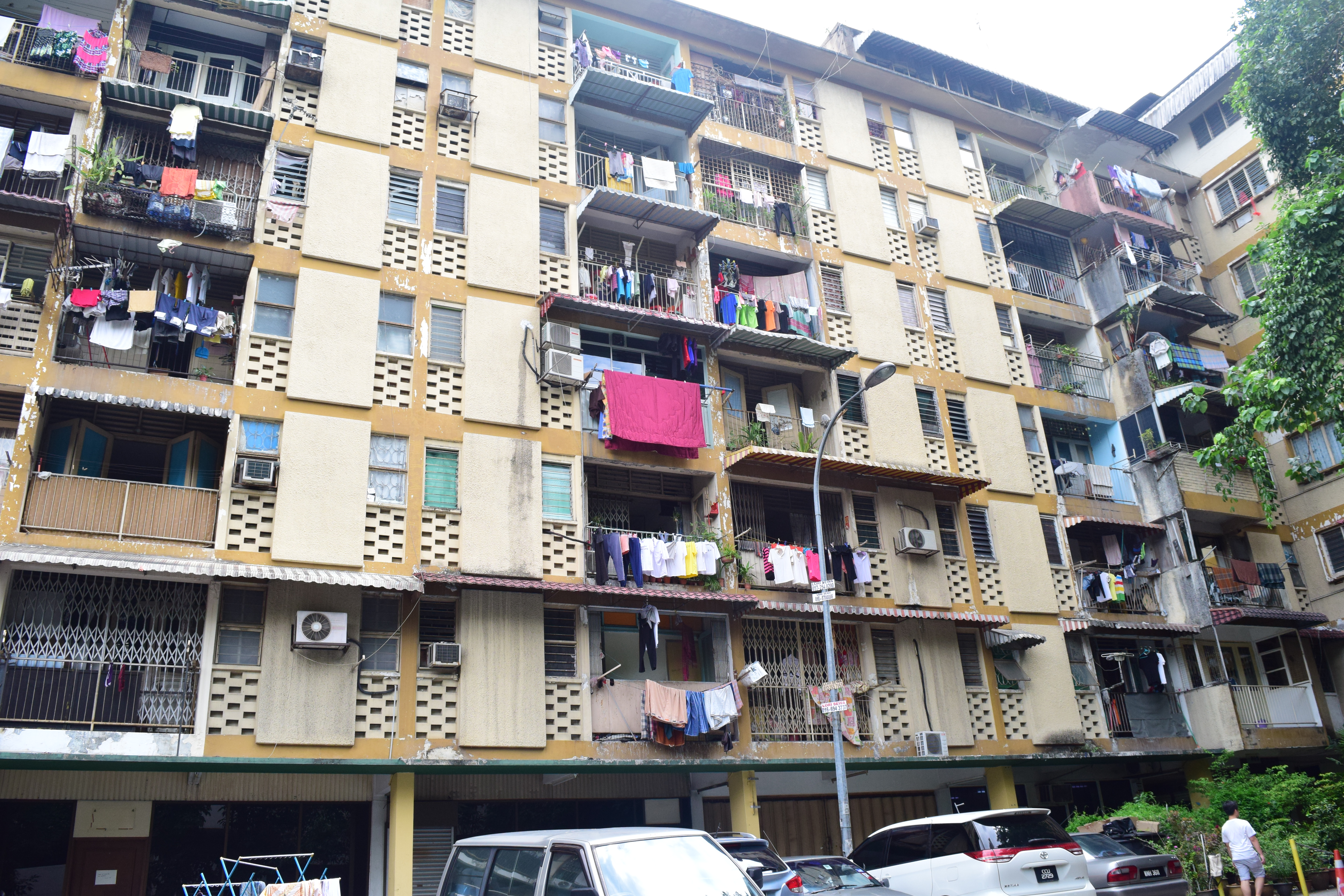
Front View of Blue Boy Mansion

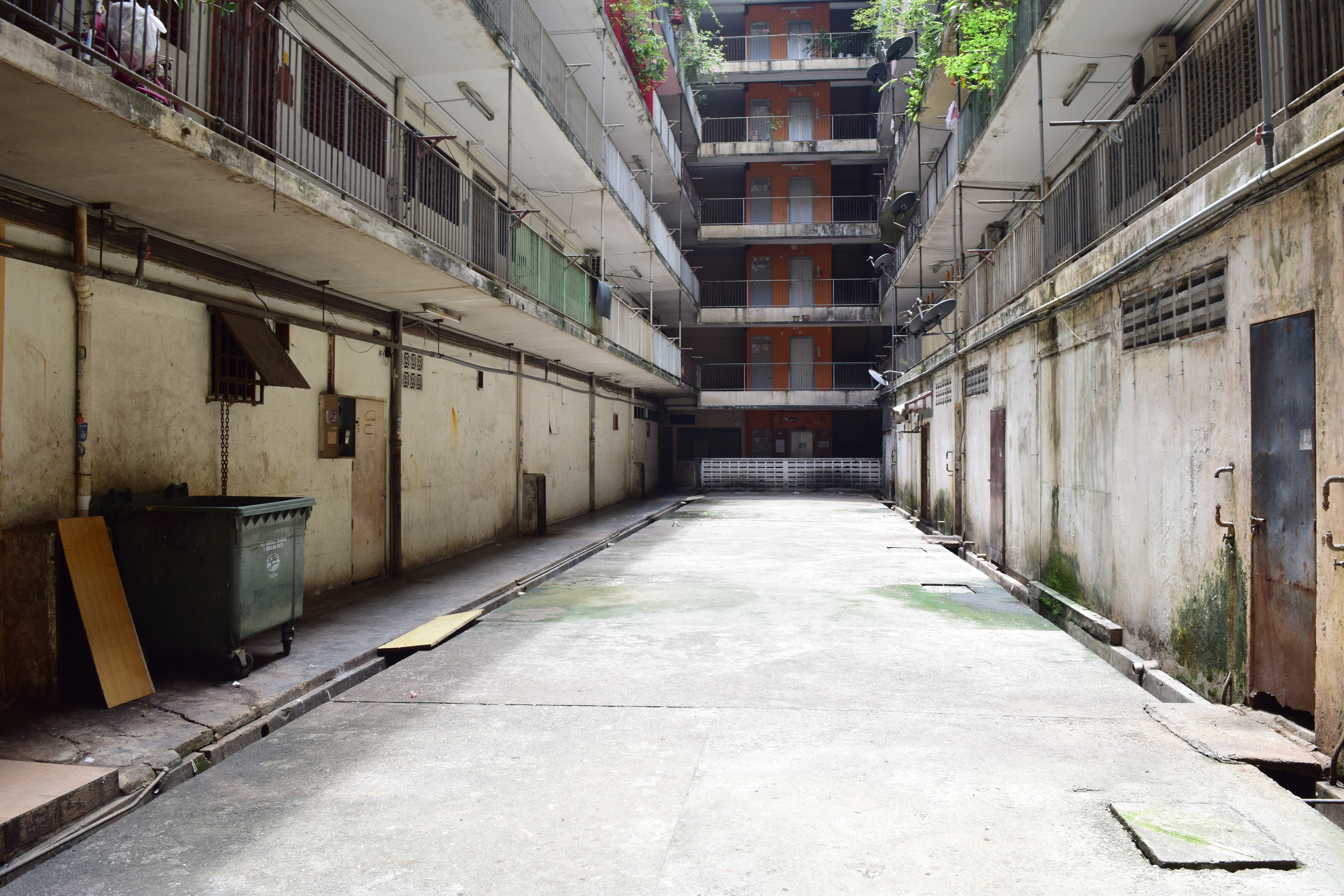
Courtyard of Blue Boy Mansion

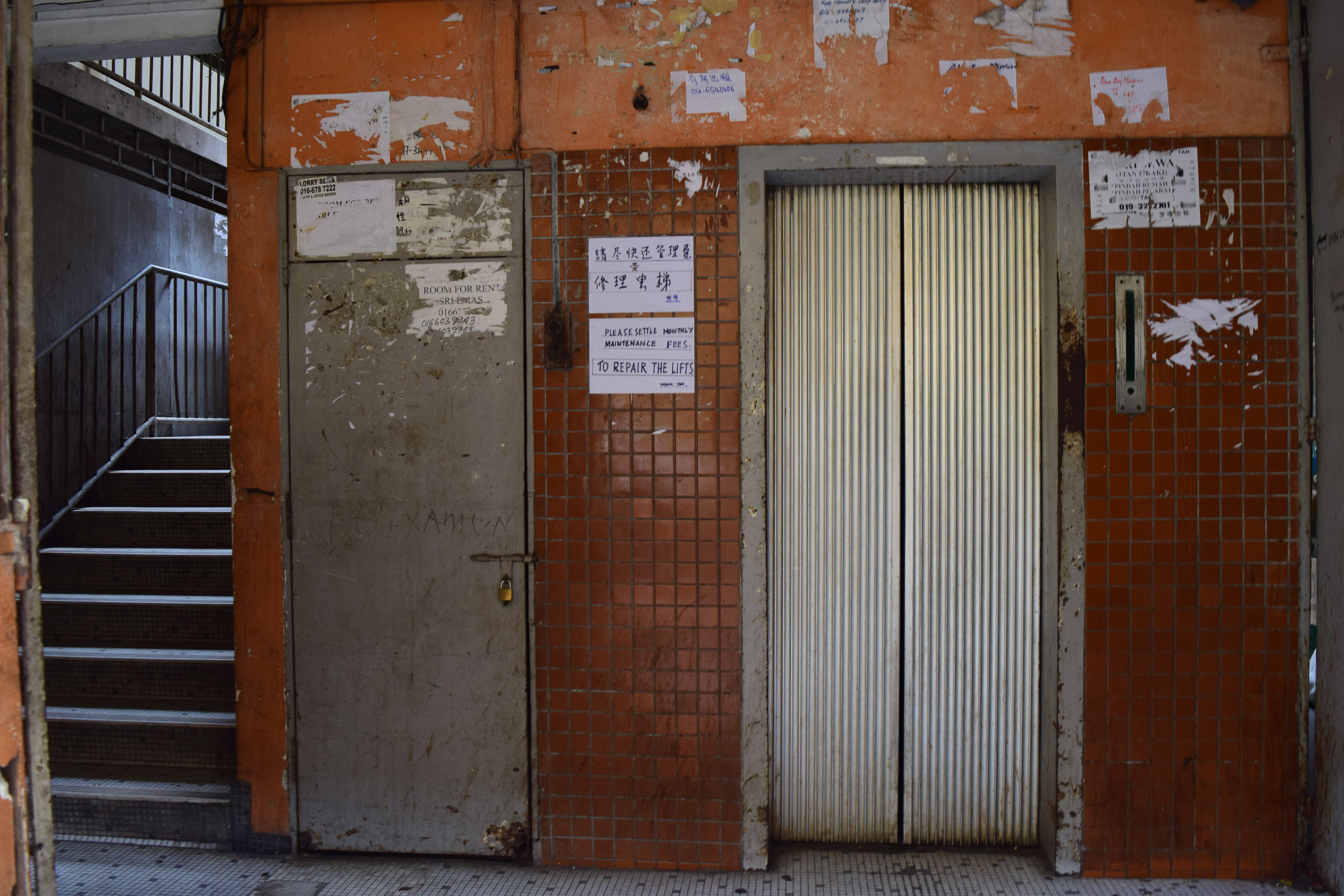
Lifts of Blue Boy Mansion

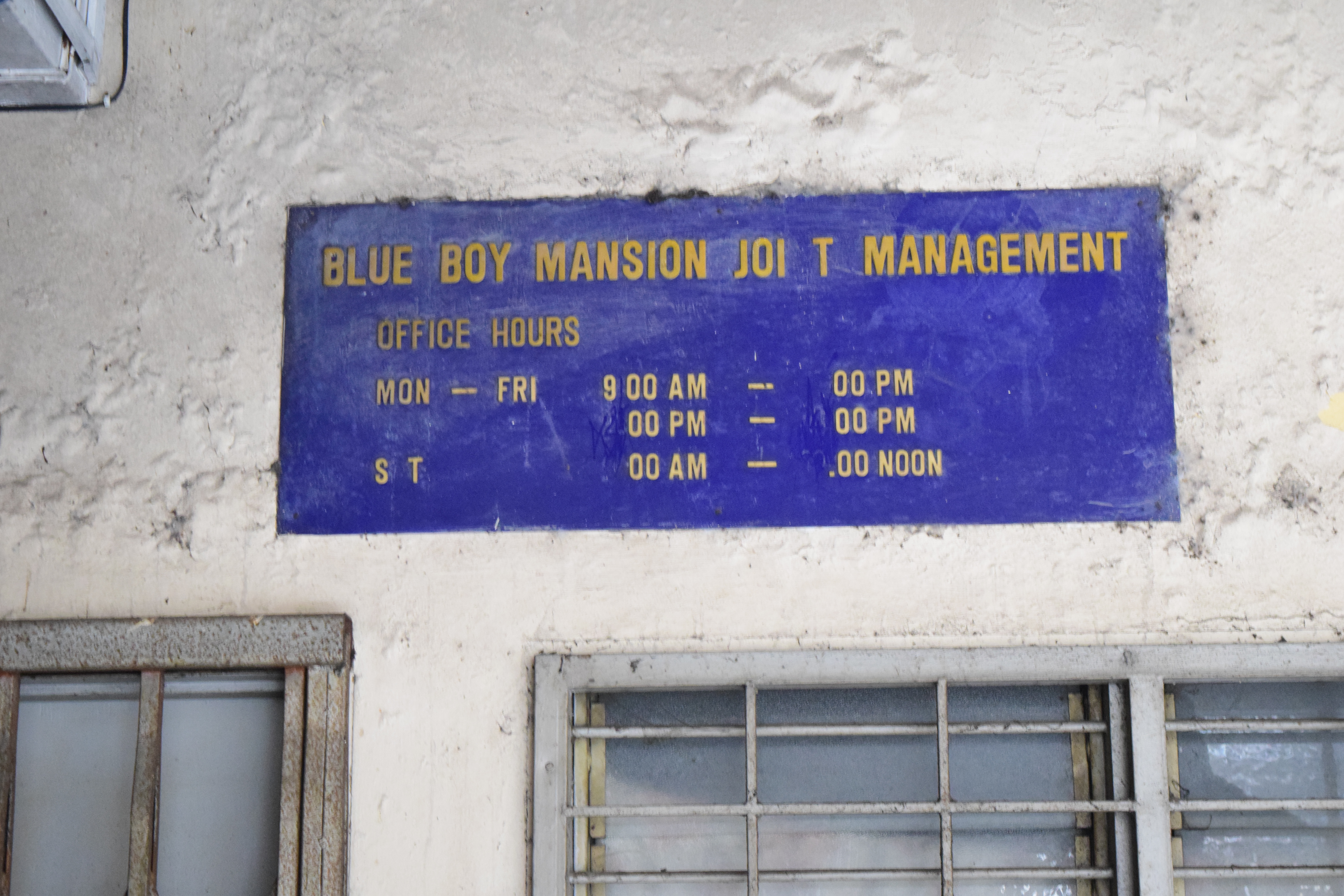
Blue Boy Mansion Management Office

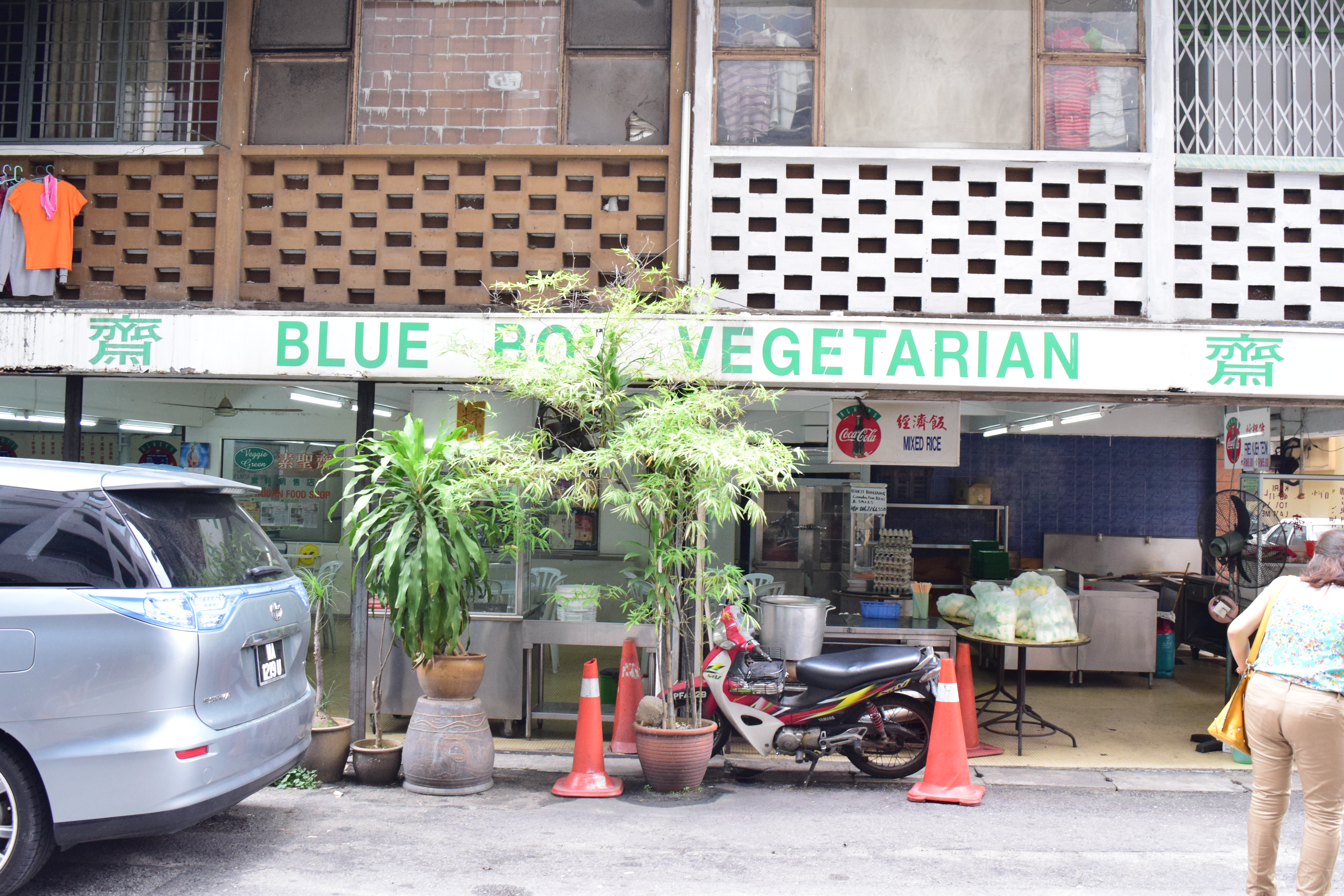
Blue Boy Vegetarian Restaurant located at Ground Floor

== Marble Jade Mansion ==
Marble Jade Mansion is an apartment block built in February 1963 in Jalan Berhala Brickfield, Kuala Lumpur. Developed by Siew Gaik Realty Co, and built by the chartered architects T.Y.Lee & Sons. It was a low cost condominium at RM15000 for each unit. The building consists of 60 units in four storey flat houses with 2 or 3 bedrooms with a square overlooking and open courtyard. It has 4 narrow staircases and limited size of walkway for drying clothes or a small shrine.

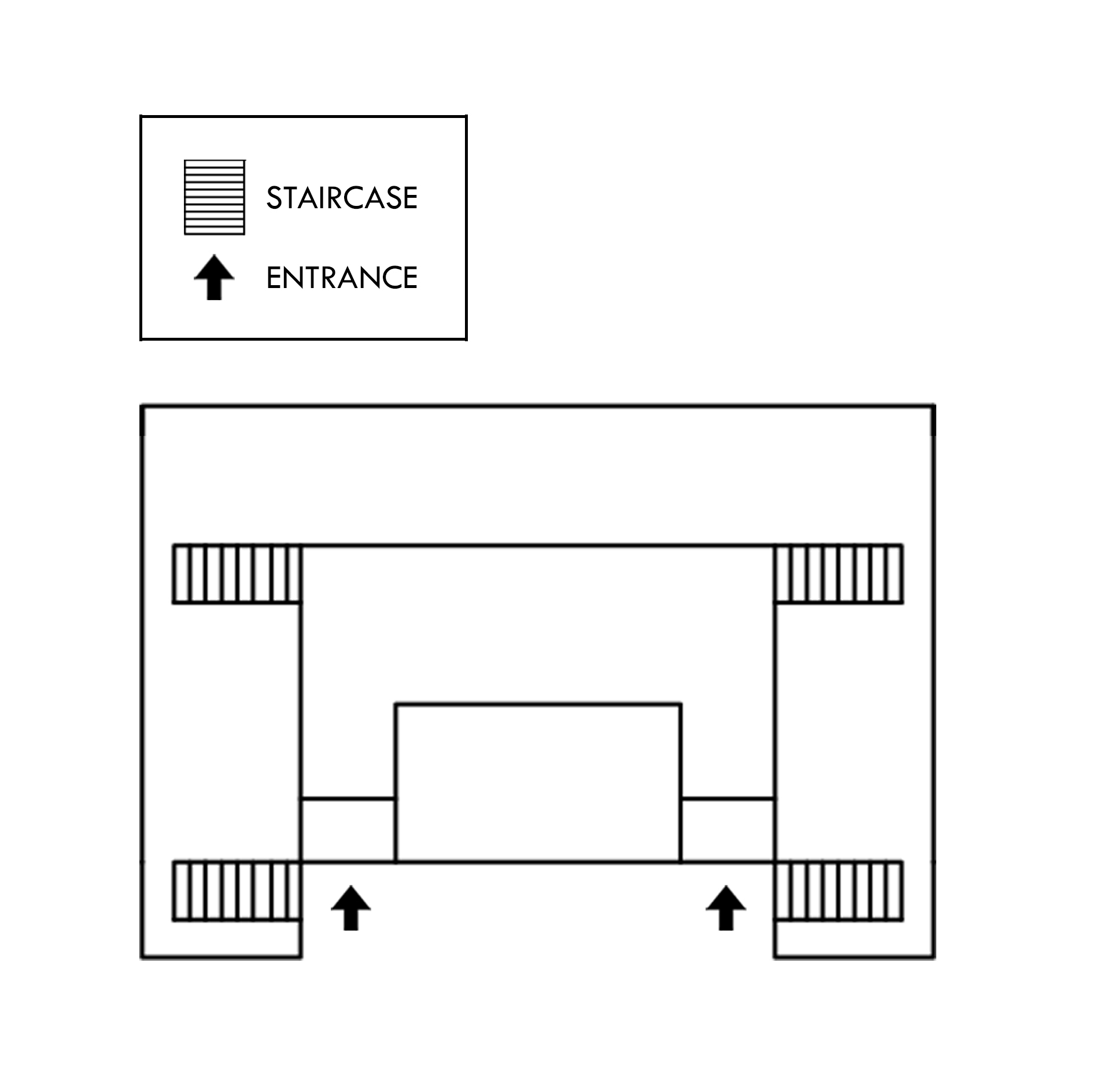
Layout Plan for Marble Jade Mansion

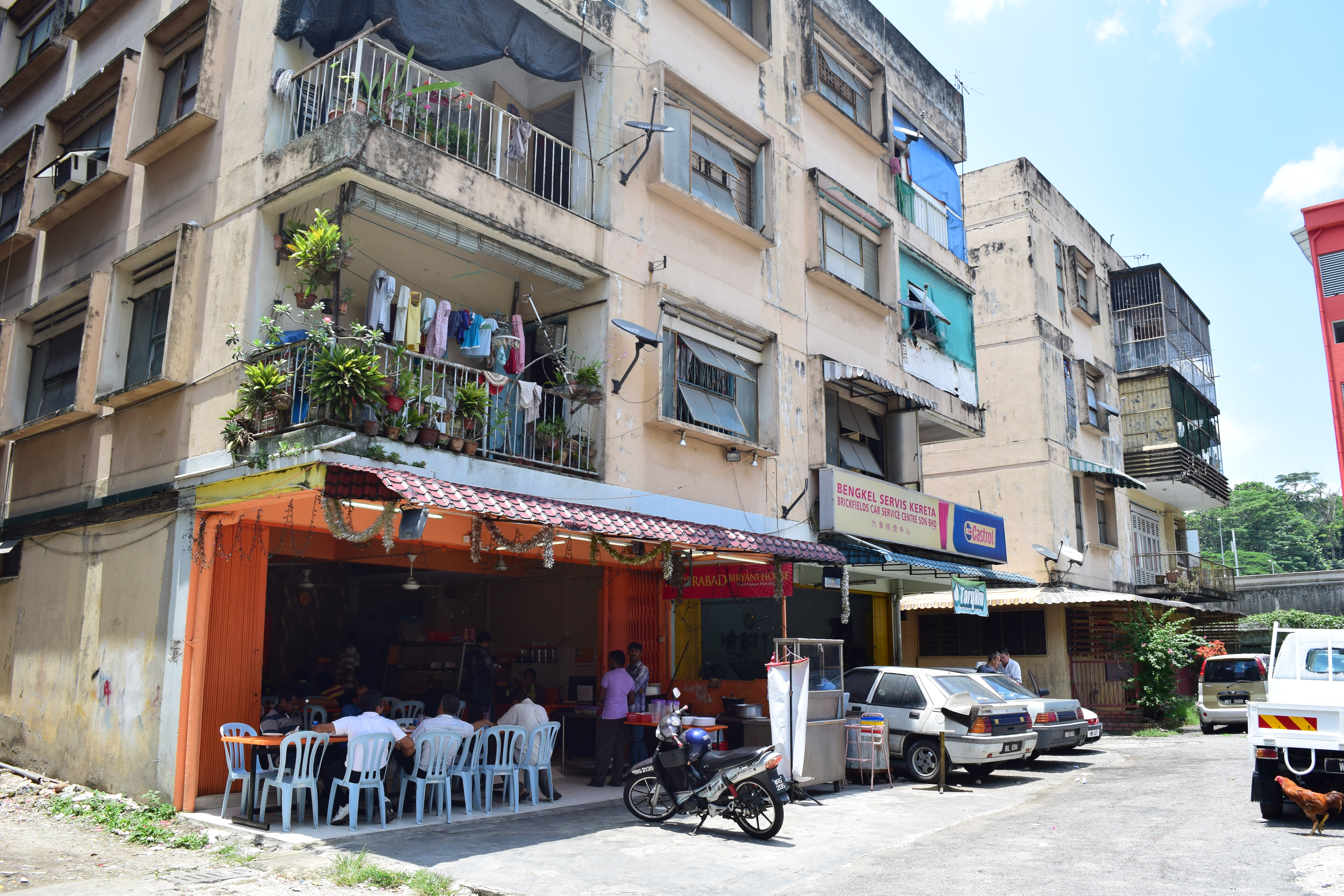
Front View of Marble Jade Mansion

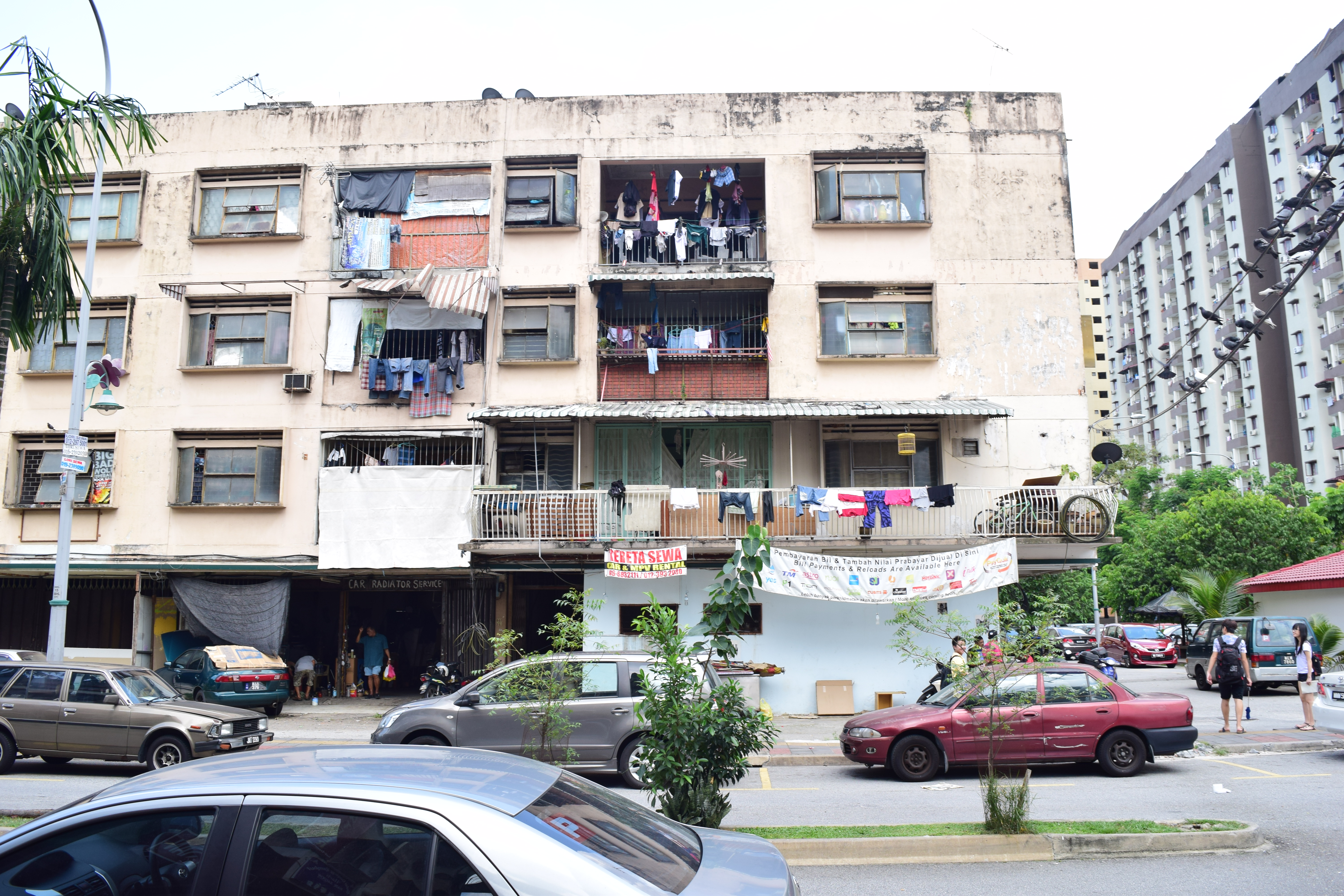
Rear View of Marble Jade Mansion

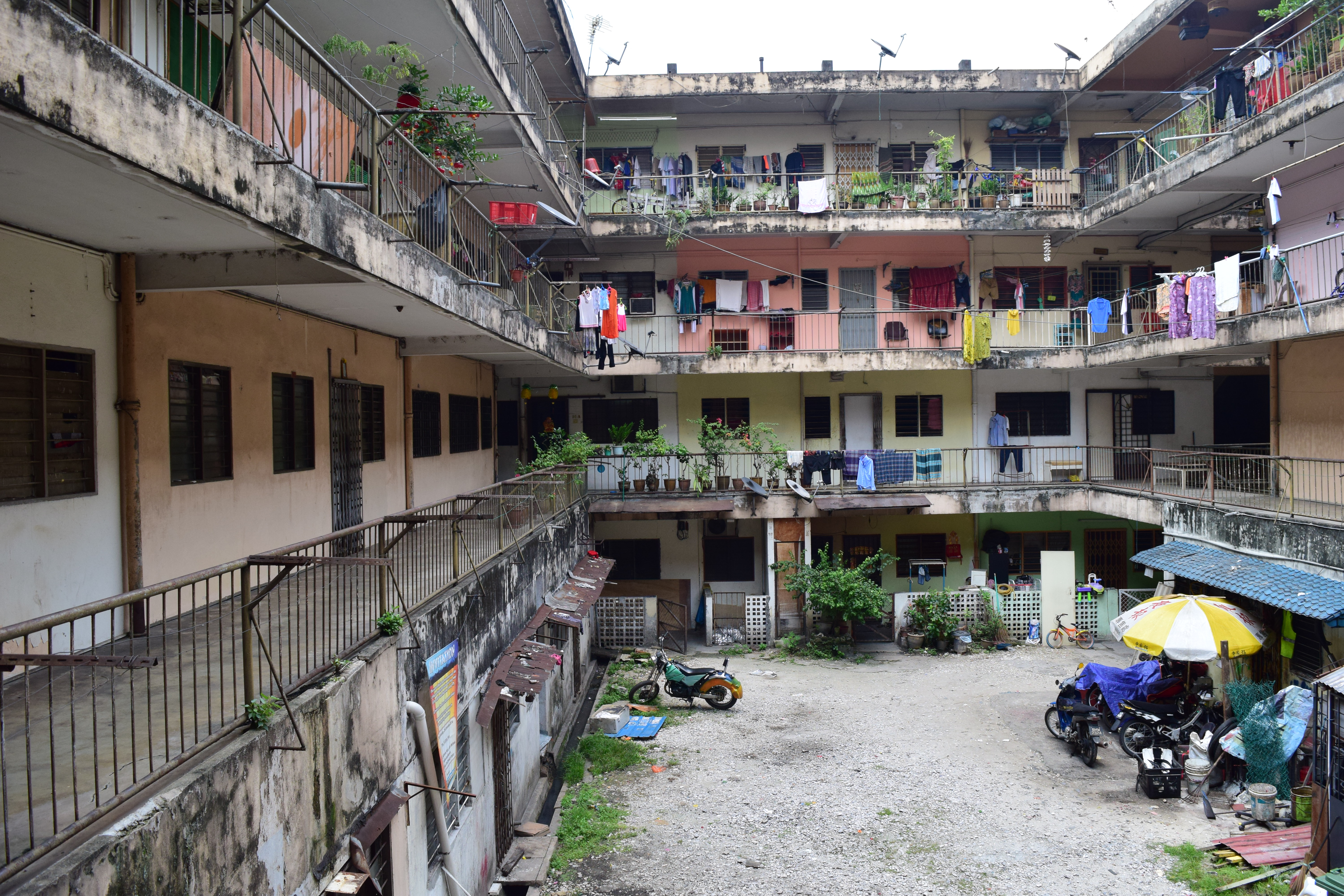
Courtyard of Marble Jade Mansion

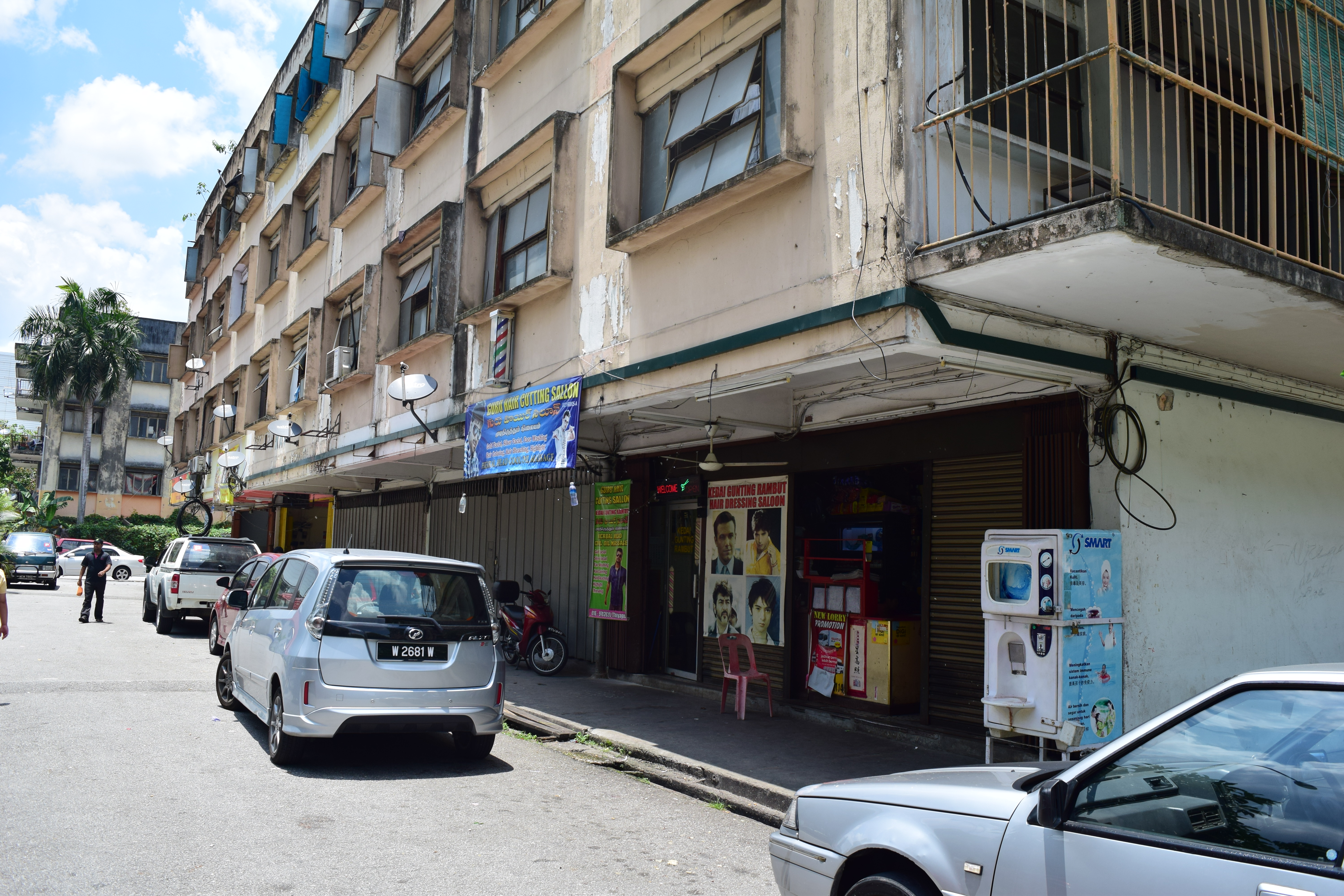
Shoplots located at Ground Floor

== Bangunan Gurucharan ==
Bangunan Gurucharan was built in March, 1963. The architect of Bangunan Gurucharan is T.Y. Lee and Sons and the contractor was Yap Keow. The owner of the building is Madam Gurucharan Kaur. The idea was to provide flexible rentable space that could be partitioned off into separate, smaller offices if required. Buildings amenities were located to avoid inconvenience, including the air-conditioning ducts, lavatories, staircases, lifts, and lighting. This was achieved by locating the lifts, staircases, refuse chutes, lavatories, and air-conditioning ducts to one side of the building and leaving the other side of the building open to natural lighting and outlook. Rentable areas are free of column obstruction. The building also marks the architect's exploration of curtain wall construction.

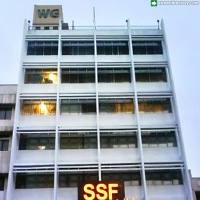
Front View of Bangunan Gurucharan

== Bungalows ==
T.Y. Lee designed 51 units of bungalow, according to the colonial classification system, types A, B, C, D, E, F, G, H, I, J and K at Ipoh Road for the Indian Co-operative Housing Society Ltd. The development was built in May 1954.

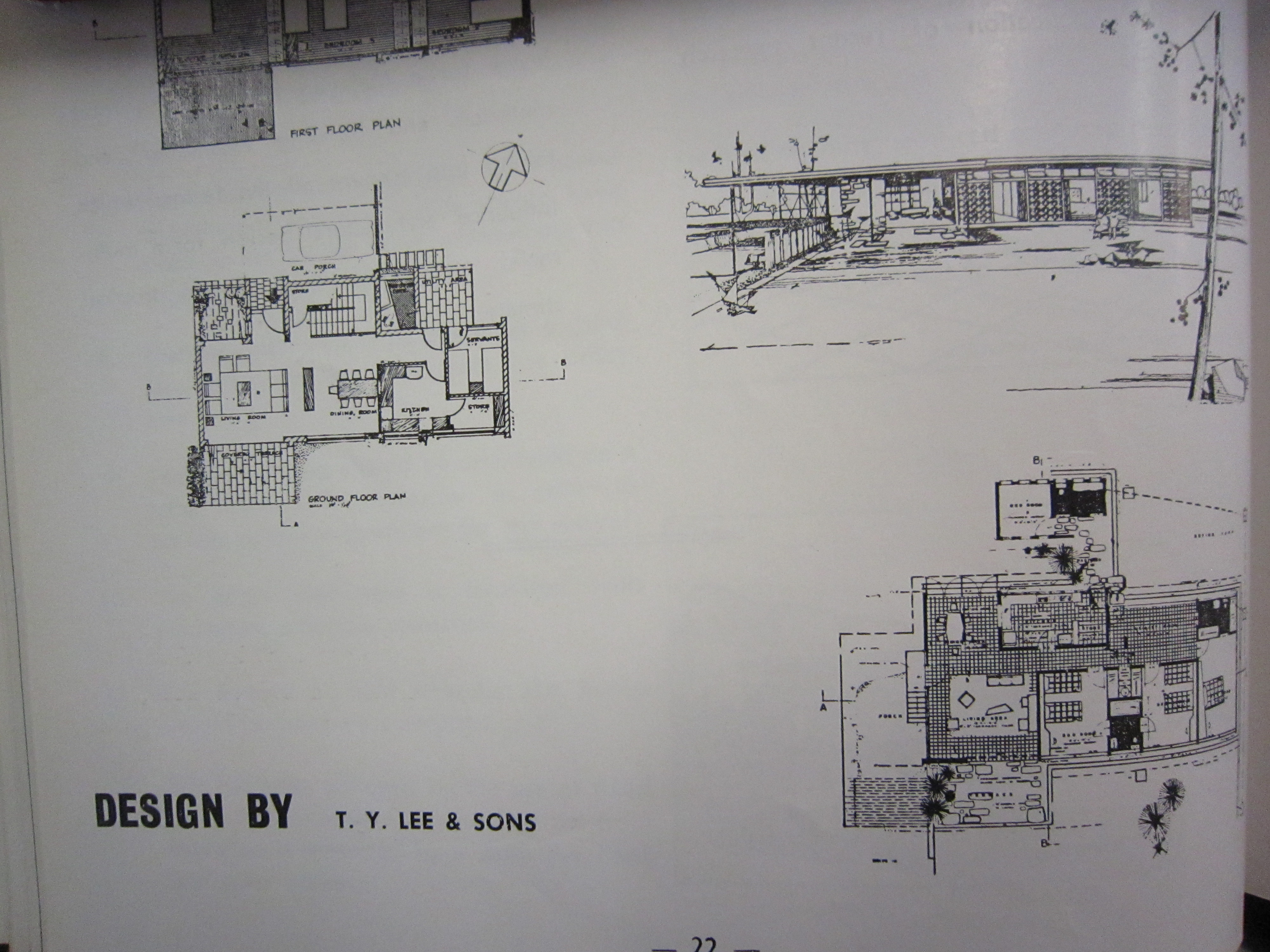
Bungalow Designed by T.Y. Lee & Sons

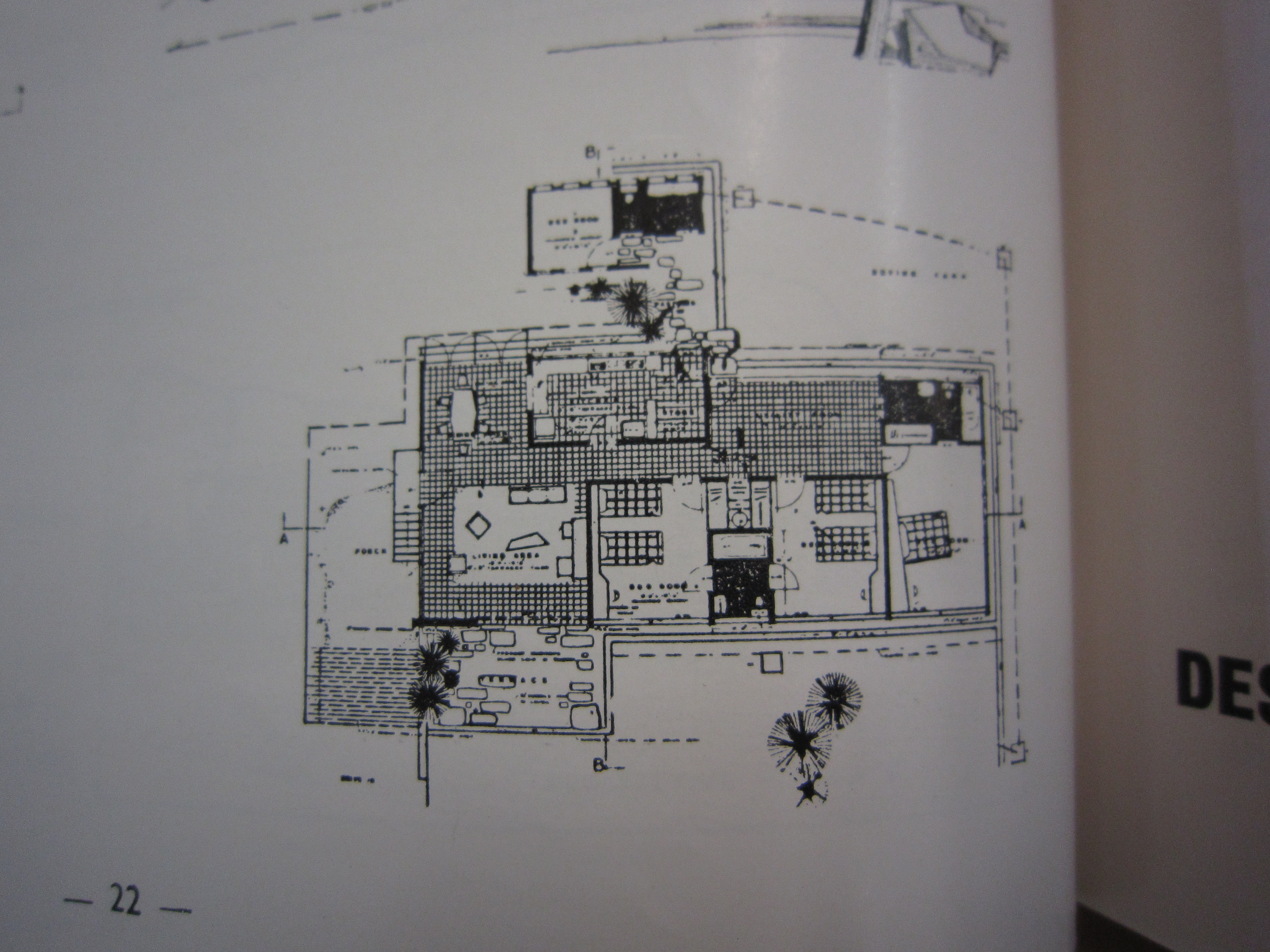
Layout Plan of the Bungalow

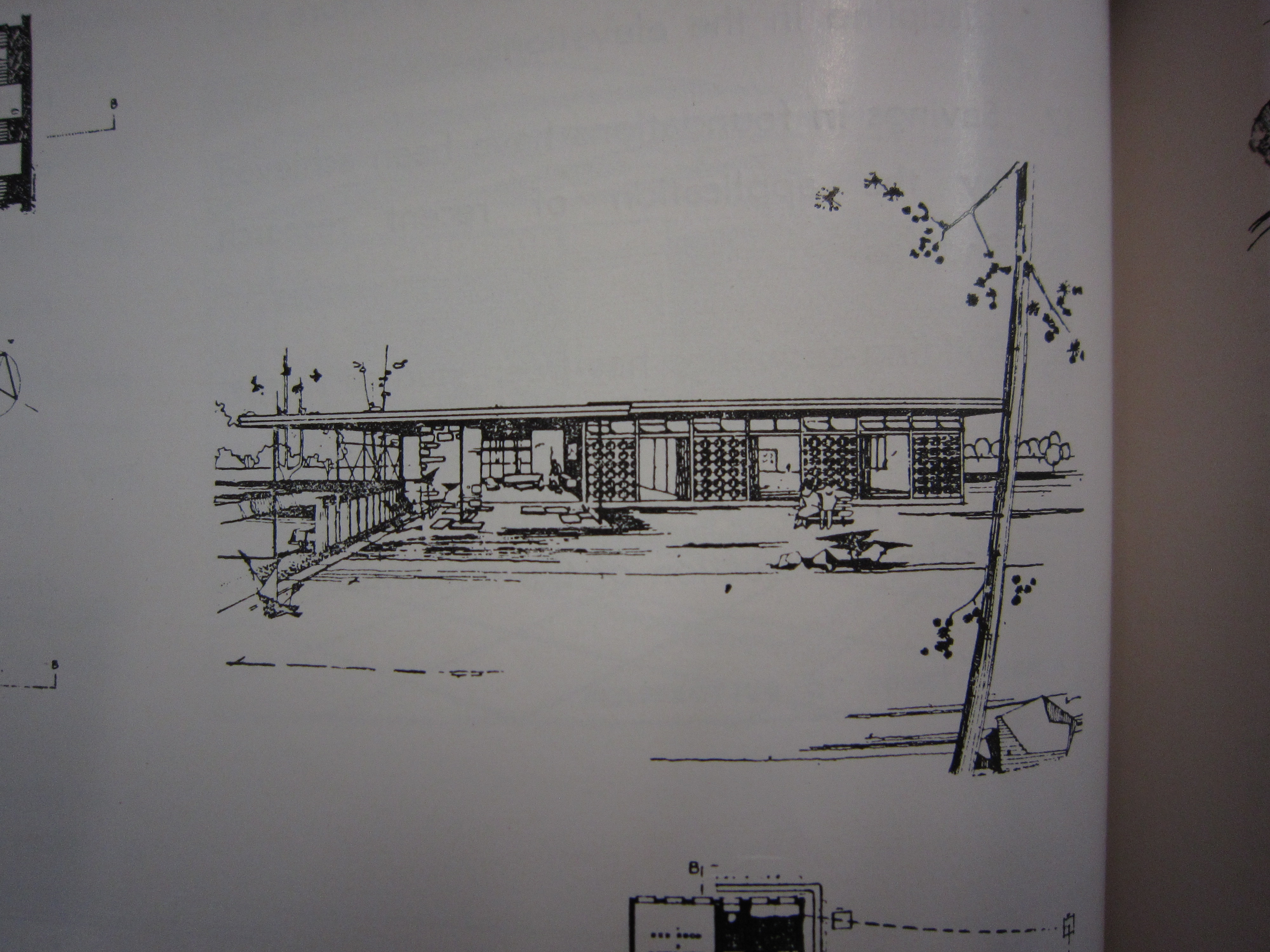
Front View of the Bungalow

== Court House ==
T.Y Lee designed a court house at Terengganu. It was built in January 1964. The architect of record was T. Y. Lee & Sons. It was built for the Public Works Department.

== Post Office ==
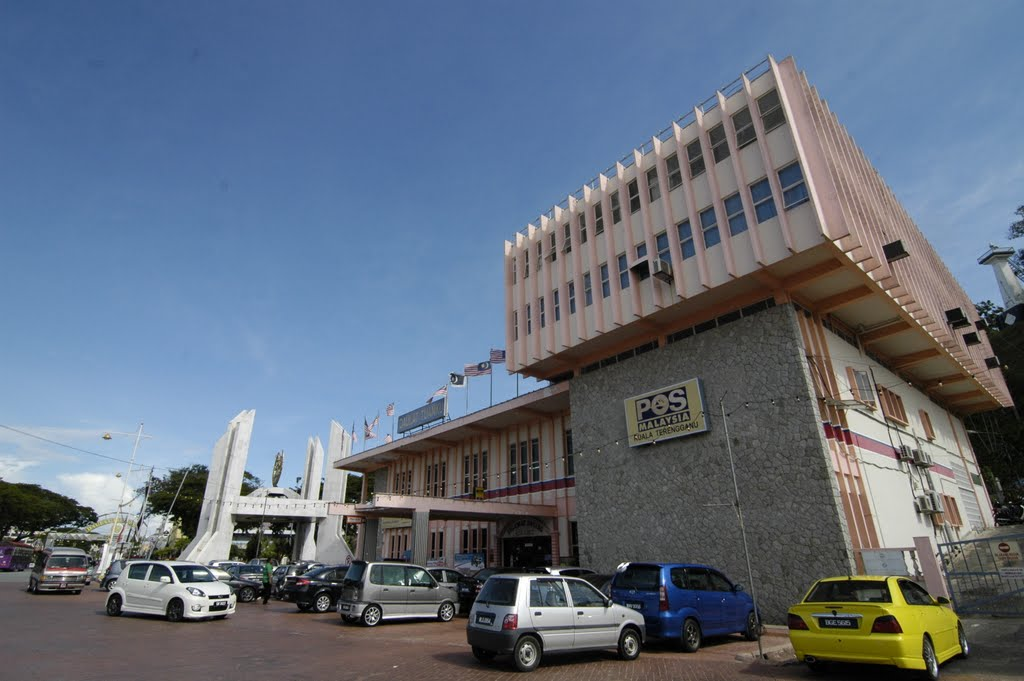
New Post Office Terengganu

The General post office Terengganu, is located at JKR 445, Jalan Sultan Zainal Abidin, Terengganu, Kuala Terengganu, Malaysia. It was built in 1966 after the old wooden office was demolished in 1964. The building still stands

== 9 Storey Flat ==
Located on Lot 1301, Section 95, Jalan Thamby Abdullah, Kuala Lumpur. The high-rise, is in Kuala Lumpur's Brickfields neighborhood. Like the architect's other apartment house, Blue Boy Mansion, the 9 Storey Flat features a roof terrace. It was built in 1965 by Architect T.Y. Lee and Sons. In 2015, the once prestigious modern flat house lay abandoned.

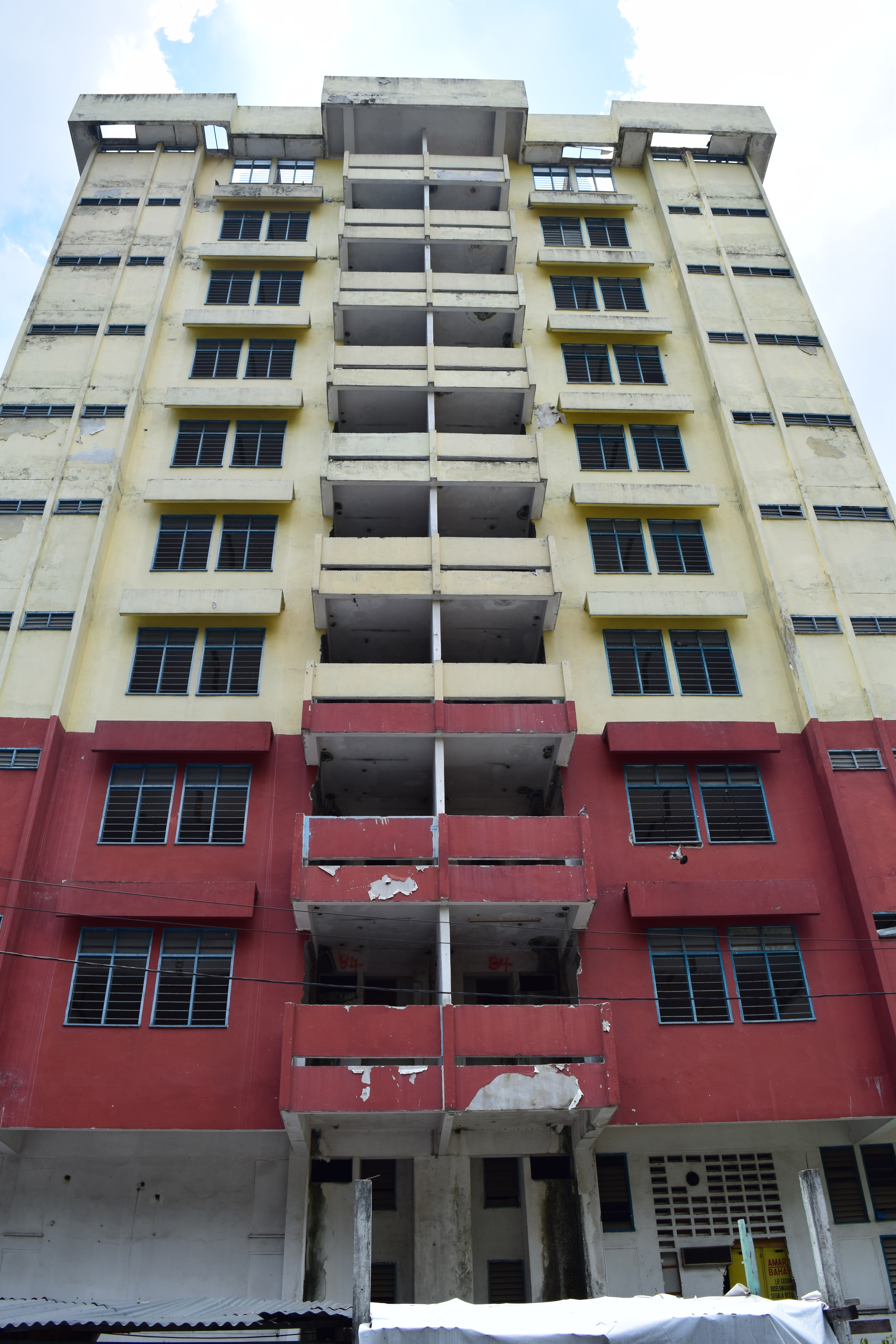
Front View of 9 Storey Flat

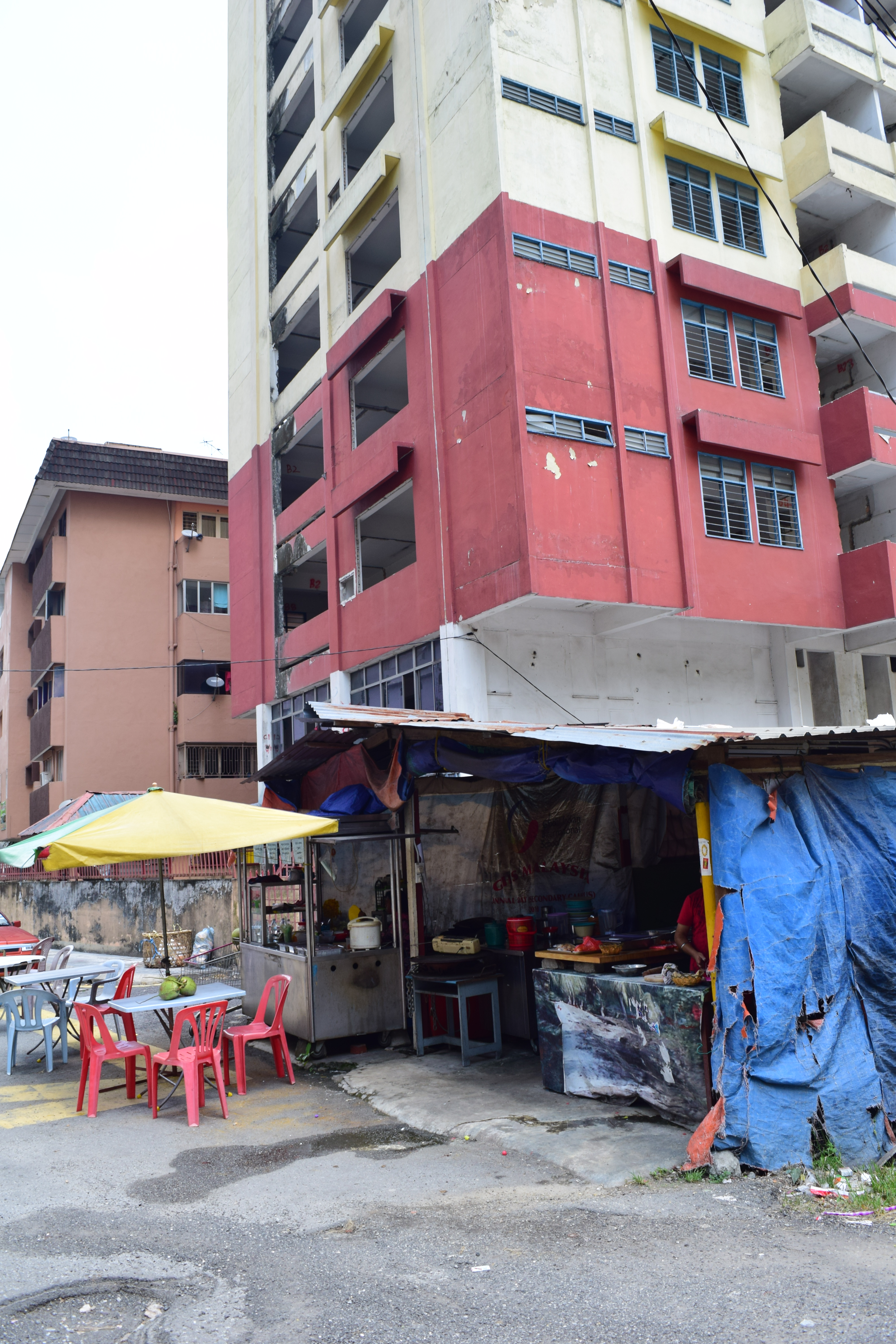
Stall located outside of the Flat

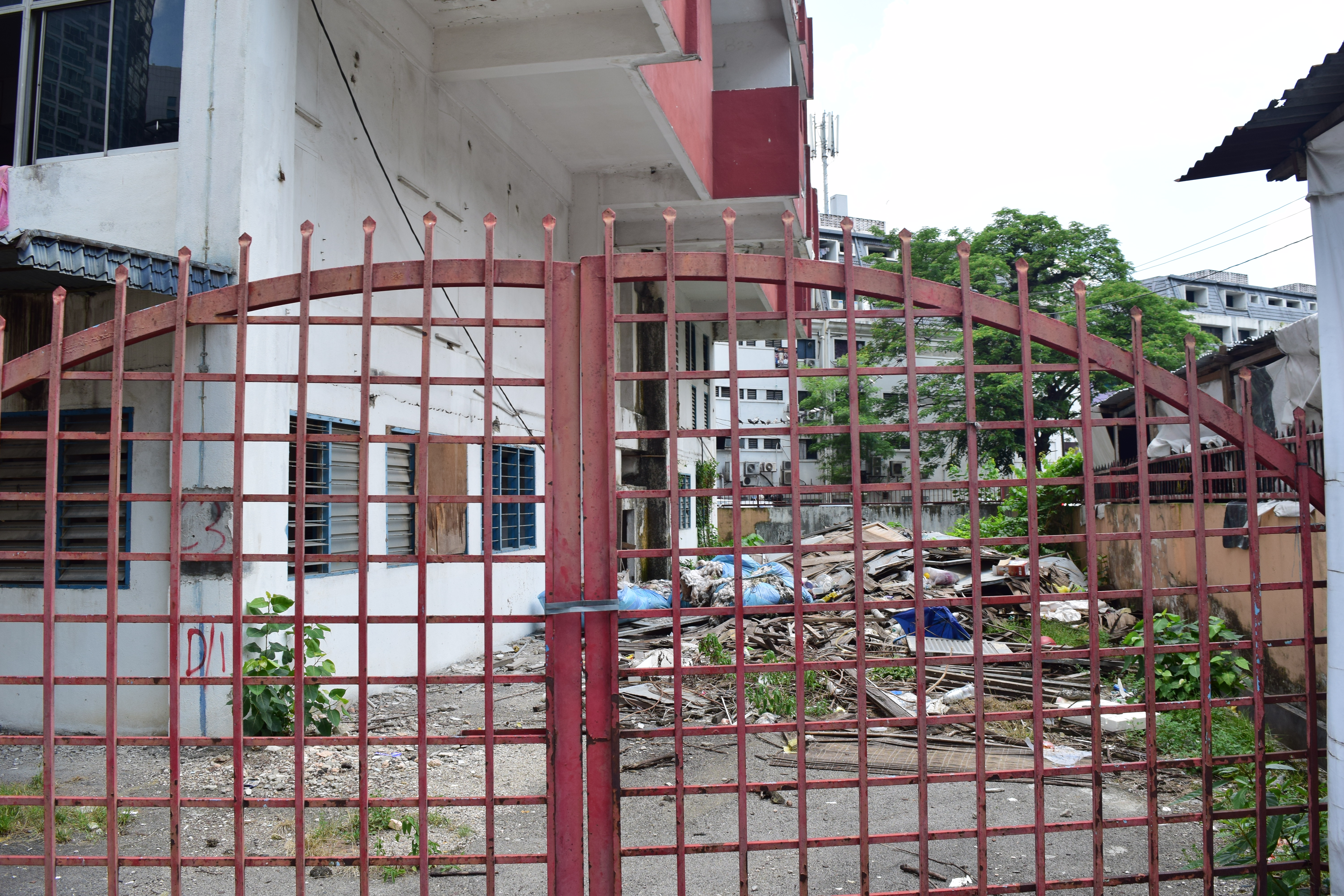
Flat is currently abandoned

== Mimaland ==
Mimaland Theme Park, Malaysia’s first Theme Park was located at Gombak, Selangor, Malaysia. It was a hospitality venture that brought a Disney-style theme park to Southeast Asia owned by Magnum Corporation. Two areas of the park complex were the prehistorical animal kingdom and the giant maze. It started business in 1971 and it ceased operation in 1994 due to the dangerous landslide that filled the lake with mud; additionally, a Singaporean man drowned at the lake of Mimaland, which became an obsession of newspaper reporting for a time. It was later claimed that it had been built without approval on land earmarked for agriculture. T.Y. Lee was hired as a consultant for the project, and while it is certain that he worked on the project, his involvement with the design of specific buildings is unclear.
