= S11 House =

General information
- Location: Petaling Jaya, Selangor, Malaysia
- Cost: approximately RM2.1m
- Owner: Dr. Tan Loke Mun & Chew May-Ann

Technical details
- Floor area: 1,100 m^{2} (12,000 sq ft)
- Grounds: 1,240 m^{2} (13,300 sq ft)

Design and construction
- Architect: Ar. Dr. Tan Loke Mun of ArchiCentre Sdn Bhd
- Other designers: ArchiCentre Sdn Bhd

Website
- http://www.s11house.com

S11 House is a residential building in Petaling Jaya, Malaysia. It was the country's first Green Building Index Platinum rated house, and won the Tropical Building Category of the Asean Energy Awards in 2013.

Designed by Ar. Dr. Tan Loke Mun, the single residential structure was conceptualized along the lines of a large tree canopy and is equipped with 5 KW peak photo-voltaic installation on the roof; rainwater is also collected on the canopy roof drains and is stored in harvesting tanks. Water features and multiple pools are located at the two extreme north–south ends to provide evaporative cooling for the house. The house proves that even in the hot and humid tropical climate of South East Asia, it is possible to lessen a building's reliance on air-conditioning and also minimize its use of other natural resources, most notably water and electricity.

A composting yard treats all the household organic and garden wastes and provides high grade compost fertilizer for the vegetable and fruit gardens. It has an overall roof U value of 0.14. The glazing roof comprises 9.38mm thick low-E safety laminated glass which can be opened up to 90%. The overall building envelope OTTV is 29.63.

S11 House is a testament to the opportunities available to build green for the architect and owner of this house, Dr. Tan. The successful structure has since been replicated in the S14 House and other commissions of private homes. The hope is that the constant experiments done on these private homes eventually will find their way into the larger consumer and mass market housing industry. This is Tan's process of taking a theory and testing it on a lab project (usually a house) and then finding a larger mass market application for the idea. The house is physical proof that upper-end residential houses can work sustainably with the environment regarding their construction and on-going maintenance.

== Awards ==
- Awarded the Platinum (CVA) Green Building Index certification 2013
- Shortlisted - World Architecture Festival Awards 2013 - House Category
- Winner - ASEAN Energy Awards 2013 - Energy Management for Buildings and Industries Awards - Tropical Building Category
- Excellence Award - Asia Pacific Interior Design Awards for Elite APDC Awards 2011 - Residential Unit Category
- Sustainable Design Award - Asia Pacific Interior Design Awards for Elite APDC Awards 2011 - Residential Unit Category
- Futurarc Green Leadership Award 2012 - Residential Architecture - Individual House Category
- Gold Medalist - The Edge-PAM - My Dream Home Awards
- Gold Medalist - The Edge-PAM My Dream Home Awards - Green Home Award
- Winner - PAM Architectural Steel Awards 2011 - Colourbond Award
- Mention Award - PAM Architectural Steel Awards 2011 - Single Residential Award
- Silver Medal - PAM Award for Architectural Excellence - Single Residential Category
