= Sungei Pari Towers =

Public housing project in Ipoh, Malaysia

Coordinates: 4.59383°N 101.06861°E

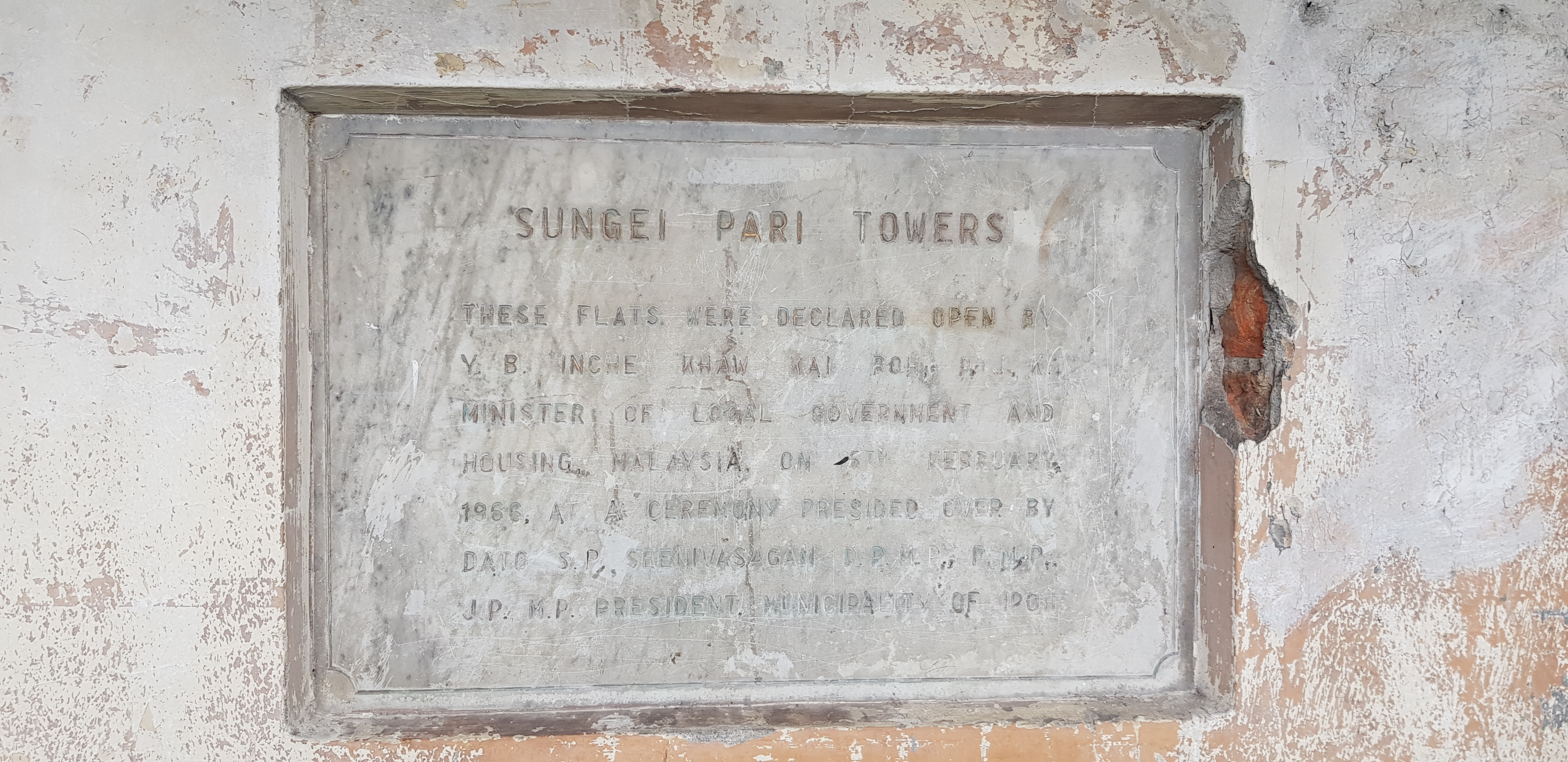
Sungei Pari Tower - Plaque

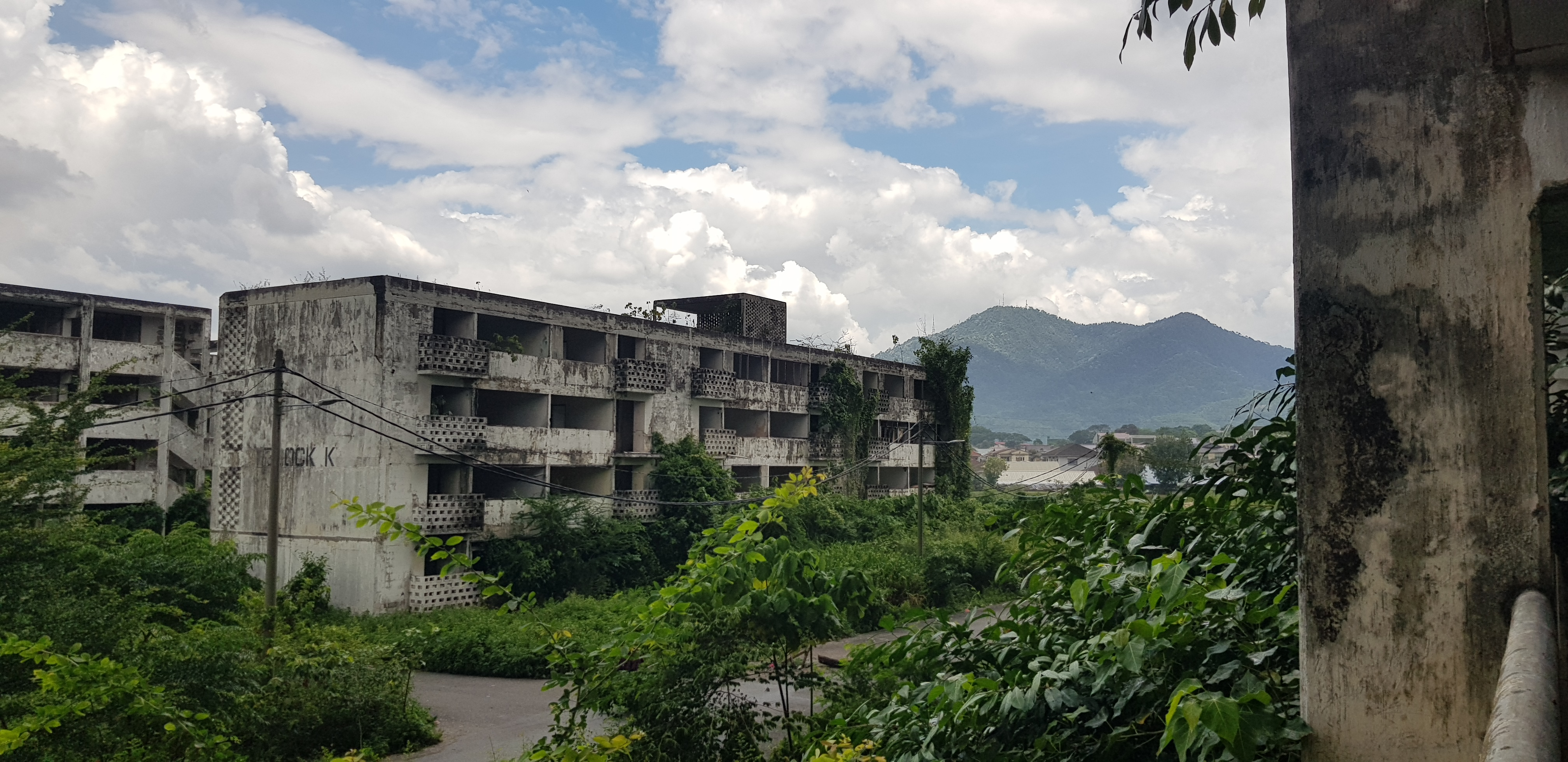
Sungei Pari Tower

Sungei Pari Towers, alternately Sungai Pari Towers (Chinese: 雙溪巴裏組屋, colloquially 十五樓 - literally 15 storeys) is a dilapidated public housing project in Ipoh, Perak, Malaysia which was built in 1963. It is located in the Buntong ward in the western part of Ipoh, along Jalan Gurdwara by the Pari River and west of Ipoh Railway Station.

== Features ==
The central tower has 15 storeys with 120 units, and surrounded by 12 four-storey low-rise units with 288 units. The scheme and layout of this public housing project was prepared by Mr David A. Aitken and Mr E. B. Carlos.

It shares many features in common with the Unité d’habitation by Le Corbusier. It has a lively roof landscape that includes a giant asymmetrical overhanging dish that provides shade. Individual residential units are open to both the north and south sides and therefore benefit from cross breezes. Even the wayfinding system utilizes the Charette font that Le Corbusier favored.

== Present state ==
The flats are managed and rented out to low-income groups by the Ipoh City Council (Majlis Bandaraya Ipoh, MBI). The flats are mostly vacant since almost a decade ago. In 2012 it was reported that only the ground floor of the 15-storey block was occupied, by three tenants. However, there already are plans to redevelop the flats since 2013.

On 25 July 2026, it was reported that two 14-year-old school girls were found dead at the flats. They were believed to have fallen from the upper floor of the flats. Immediately after, Perak Housing and Property Board CEO Zaiteena Wan Nasir said that all but two heritage buildings will be demolished and replaced with new developments.
