= Nik Mohamed Mahmood =

Dato’ Seri Nik Mohamed bin Nik Mahmood is a Director of Kumpulan Senireka Sdn Bhd., a large commercial architecture firm in Kuala Lumpur, Malaysia. Mahmood founded the firm in 1973 after he left the Public Works Department. The firm specializes in commercial highrise buildings, and they have done some significant religious buildings. In the 1970s they were operating in the Brutalist idiom, but they turned to Postmodernism at the end of the century and were responsible for some prominent postmodern buildings in Malaysia, including the Menara Axis, 2002, Istana Negara Baru and the Kompleks Dewan Bahasa & Pustaka (the original building was designed by Y.T. Lee, the towering addition is by Mahmood's firm).

Mahmood studied at the Birmingham School of Architecture, United Kingdom, from 1957 to 1962. In 1973, Mahmood left the Government service and started his own architectural practice under the name of Kumpulan Senireka with a staff of 10. In the 1970s, the firm operated out of an office in the Wisma Central Building on Jalan Ampang. The firm grew steadily and today has a staff of over 73, which includes 23 professional staff. Mohamed describes himself as adhering to the modernist cred 'form follows function'. This was most obvious in one of his early successes, the Bank Negara Malaysia, whose facade is made of concrete panels arranged to form strong horizontal lines with its bands of continuous windows. Nik Mahmood Mohamed has received numerous awards in his life, one of which was bestowed on him by the Sultan of Selangor. Mahmood also did some of the nation's most significant official mosques and palaces which include Istana Negara, Jalan Duta and the Putra Mosque.

== Significant buildings ==
- Palaces

Istana Darul Ehsan

Located in Putrajaya, Malaysia, this palace is a royal residence for the Sultan of Selangor and it is not open to public. It was constructed in 2000 and was constructed in a Tudor style with a high deep grey façade. The postmodern updating of the Tudor style refers to both the English colonial period, and the traditional Malay timber-frame house. Although technically built with modern construction techniques, it shows the architect distancing himself from modernist design.

== Istana Negara, Jalan Duta ==
Mahmood's current company, Kumpulan Seni Reka Sdn Bhd was a part of the construction of this palace. The construction for this palace started in 2007 and was completed in 2011. According to Mahmood, constructing this building was like seeing Malay traditional concept combining with Islamic architecture. This palace is the official residence of the Yang di-Pertuan Agong, the head of state of Malaysia. It is located along Jalan Duta in northern Kuala Lumpur.

== Istana Selangor ==
Located at Jalan Salahuddin, Kuala Lumpur, this palace is used by the Sultan of Selangor, Sultan Sharafuddin Idris Shah and his families. This palace is currently used by his sister, Tuanku Tengku Nor Zehan Sultan Salahuddin Abdul Aziz Shah. Mahmood was involved with the design of the plan.

== Mosques ==
Putra Mosque

The construction of this mosque started in 1997 and completed two years later. It was part of the first phase of Putrajaya, Malaysia's new administrative capital, one of the world's handful of new capital cities, a list that includes Brasília, Canberra, and Chandigarh. Nik Mohamed Mahmood was an integral part of the team of designers and architects who planned the new city. This mosque can accommodate 15,000 worshipers during Friday prayers, and is one of the nation's largest. Indo-Saracenic in design, it refers both to the colonial buildings by A.B. Hubback, and the Mughal architecture of India and Pakistan.

Tengku Ampuan Jemaah Mosque

Built in 2010, this mosque was named after the Sultan of Selangor, Sultan Sharafuddin Idris Shah's grandmother, the late Tengku Ampuan Jemaah, and was completed in 2012. The Sultan of Selangor officially opened the Mosque on 13 March 2013. The mosque is inspired by the traditional Islamic Architecture of the Middle East, and can accommodate 4,000 worshipers.

== Other ==
Bank Negara

The Bank Negara Malaysia was built in 1967 and fully completed in 1970. It is located on Jalan Sultan Salahuddin and surrounded by landmarks include Kuala Lumpur's historic center, the Dataran Merdeka and Tugu Negara. This building represents Nik Mohamed Mahmood's initial architectural philosophy that was firmly rooted in the Brutalist strand of international modernism.

Kompleks Pusat Islam Malaysia

Established in 1974, this complex was finished 4 years later. On 16 September 1985, the 4th Prime Minister of Malaysia, Dato’ Seri Dr. Mahathir Mohamad inaugurated the institution. This complex is now the official building for The Federal Territory Islamic Affairs Department and is now located at Jalan Perdana, Kuala Lumpur opposite of the National Mosque of Malaysia. Its design marks an important shift for Mahmood, and for South East Asian architecture. While remaining true to the dictates of international modernism, its form, decoration, and layout was informed by historical Islamic design, producing a new hybrid style that could be called Islamic modernism. This new variant reflected the growing importance and wealth of Islamic nations in the Middle East and South East Asia.

Kuala Lumpur Tower

This tower is located in the heart of Kuala Lumpur and was a three-phase construction that started in 1991 and completed in 1995. This standing high tower is in the modernist technological idiom, but the base features some Islamic decoration, and the shape of the tower has been likened to the Javanese dagger, or keris.

Mahmood's activity level increased in the 21st century, and his projects initially seemed to reflect international postmodernism in which they took on the symbolic orthodoxy of international Islamic designs. He did a series of royal palaces, and official mosques, and played a major role in the nation's new capital, Putrajaya.

== Conclusion ==
An architect who has been active in Malaysia from the 1960s to the present, the shifts in Nik's style reflect global trends as they played out in South East Asia. He started in a period in which his work was consistent with international modernism, and he produced some of the nation's most accomplished Brutalist buildings. Decades later, he had abandoned that stylistic position in favour of a historicist approach, which was coincident with the appearance of postmodernism on the global stage. Over time, his buildings moved further in the direction of tradition, and away from the ironic position of postmodernism. He increasingly incorporated recognizable Islamic forms to brand his buildings as belonging to the various global traditions of residential and religious Islamic architecture.

== Awards ==
1.Archibald Dawnay Scholarship Trust Prize

2.Royal Institute of British Architects 1960

3.Royal Institute of British Architects

4. The Owen Jones Studentship 1963

5.Ahli Mangku Negara by His Majesty DYMM Yang DiPertuan Agong in 1971

6.Dato' Paduka Mahkota Selangor by DYMM Sultan Selangor in 1985

7.Honorary Degree of Doctor of the university, July 1997

8.University of Central England in Birmingham, United Kingdom
