= Mimaland =

Abandoned recreation water theme park in Malaysia

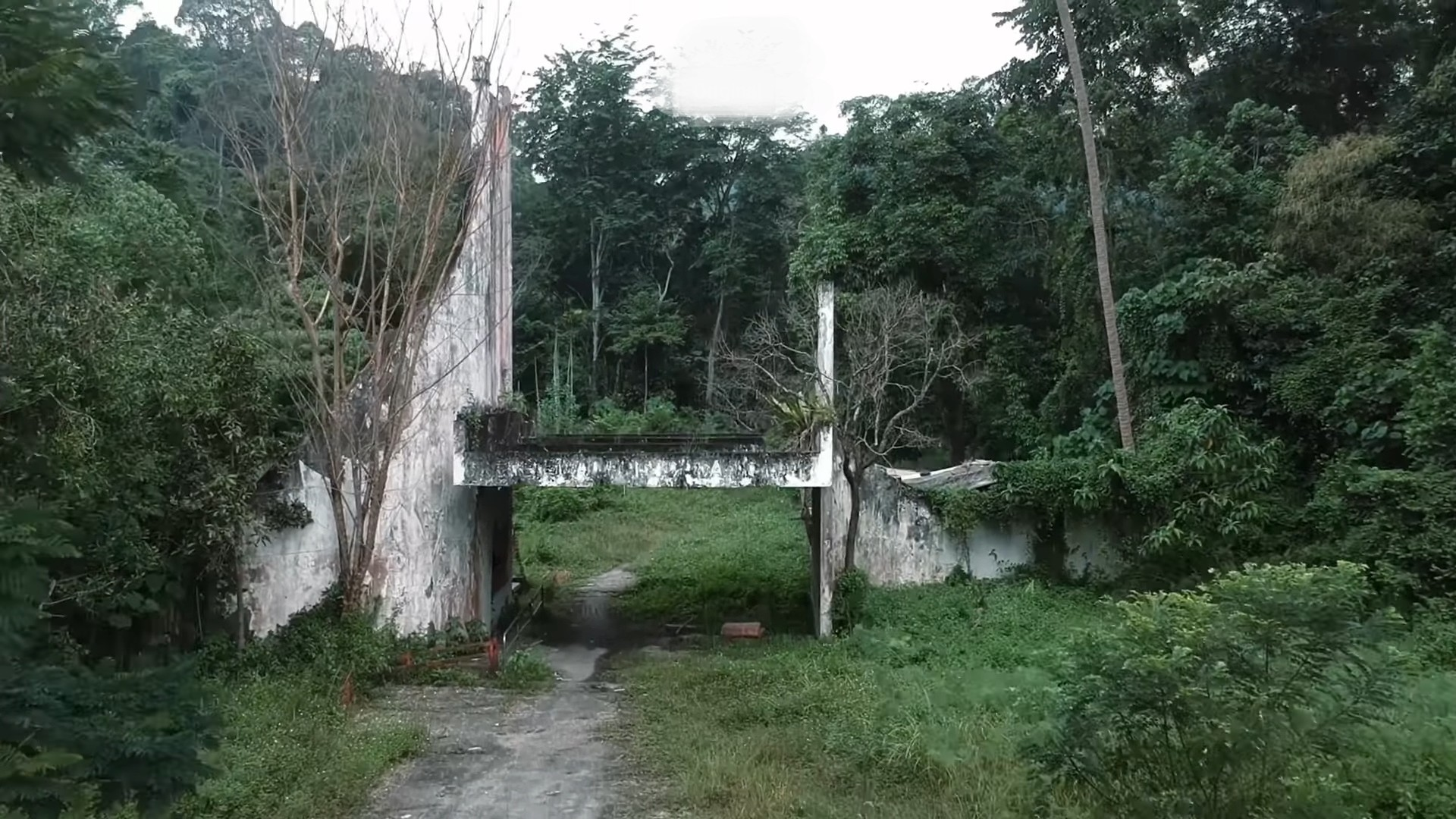
- Gate of Mimaland
- Interactive map of Mimaland
- Location: Gombak, Selangor, Malaysia
- Coordinates: 3.28499°N 101.7227945°E
- Status: Defunct
- Opened: 1975; 51 years ago
- Closed: May 1994; 32 years ago
- Owner: Mimaland Berhad

Mimaland is an abandoned recreation water theme park in Gombak, Selangor, Malaysia. Regarded as Malaysia's first theme park, it opened in 1975 and closed down permanently in May 1994, after a landslide damaged the property. The entrance gate and remains of Mimaland still exist today.

== History ==
Mimaland started operating in 1975. The name Mimaland is actually an acronym of the word combination Malaysia In Miniature Land. Mimaland was built on a hilly area of 300 acres (120 ha) in Ulu Gombak near Kuala Lumpur, served by an exit to the old Gombak-Bentong road. It was owned by Mimaland Berhad, a member of Magnum Group of Companies (now Magnum Corporation).

Mimaland's construction was done in phases and the theme park was opened in stages. Mimaland's first phase was completed in 1970, and consisted of 24 motels, 5 chalets and a swimming pool.

Among the main attractions, was the 'prehistoric animal park' containing dinosaur models of a very impressive size. Additionally, Mimaland also had a lake for boating and fishing activities, a 'giant maze', as well as a cross-forest area.

On 25 January 1993, a 27-year-old Singaporean technician who was on a Chinese New Year holiday was slammed by another rider while using the giant slide at the Mimaland pool. He was left paralysed and died due to spinal cord injuries. The local authority, Gombak District Council, issued new safety measures to Mimaland on 5 February.

The incident shocked the public and resulted in a temporary closure of Mimaland. After improvement was done to the giant slide, Mimaland was reopened. However, a minor landslide caused damage to the walls of the same pool in May 1994. This incident caused muddy water to seep into the pool, causing the area to close to the public.

Several parties, including government agencies, took the management of Mimaland to court on a number of offenses, among which were security control issues. As a result, the court barred Mimaland from continuing its operations. Mimaland was closed permanently in 1994. Mimaland relics still exist to this day.
