= Tan Loke Mun =

Malaysian architect

- Born: 19 November 1965 (age 60); Petaling Jaya, Malaysia
- Occupation: Architect

Dr. Tan Loke Mun is the founder and Director of ArchiCentre Sdn. Bhd, DTLM Design Group and principal of DrTanLM Architect, architectural design studios in Subang Jaya, Malaysia. He is best known for having designed the first Green Building Index Platinum rated house in Malaysia, the S11 House.

== Biography ==
Born and raised in Petaling Jaya, Malaysia, Tan obtained his architectural training from Deakin University, Australia during the 1980s. He later received his doctorate from The University of Melbourne, Australia. His doctoral studies were in social and self-help housing and he has worked in many urban and rural parts of Australia, Uruguay, and Argentina.

He founded ArchiCentre in 1994.

He is a past president of the Malaysian Institute of Architects 2005–2007 (PAM), team leader who set up Green Building Index Malaysia (GBI), past chairman of the LAM-PAM Green Building and Sustainability Committee, past member of the GBI Accreditation Panel (GBIAP) and also a member of the Board of Architects Malaysia.

The S11 House is Malaysia’s first Green Building Index Platinum-rated work for domestic architecture. It won the Tropical Building Category of the ASEAN Energy Awards in 2013, the Futurarc Green Leadership Award 2012, Gold medal in the Edge-PAM Green Home Award 2011, Gold Medal for the PAM-Edge Residential Award 2011, Winner of PAM Architectural Steel Colourbond Award 2011, Gold winner for Residential and Sustainable Categories of Asia Pacific Design Excellence Awards 2011 and Finalist for World Architecture Festival (WAF) Awards 2012. The S11 House while not the firm's largest project, it has been one of the firm's biggest ideological successes.

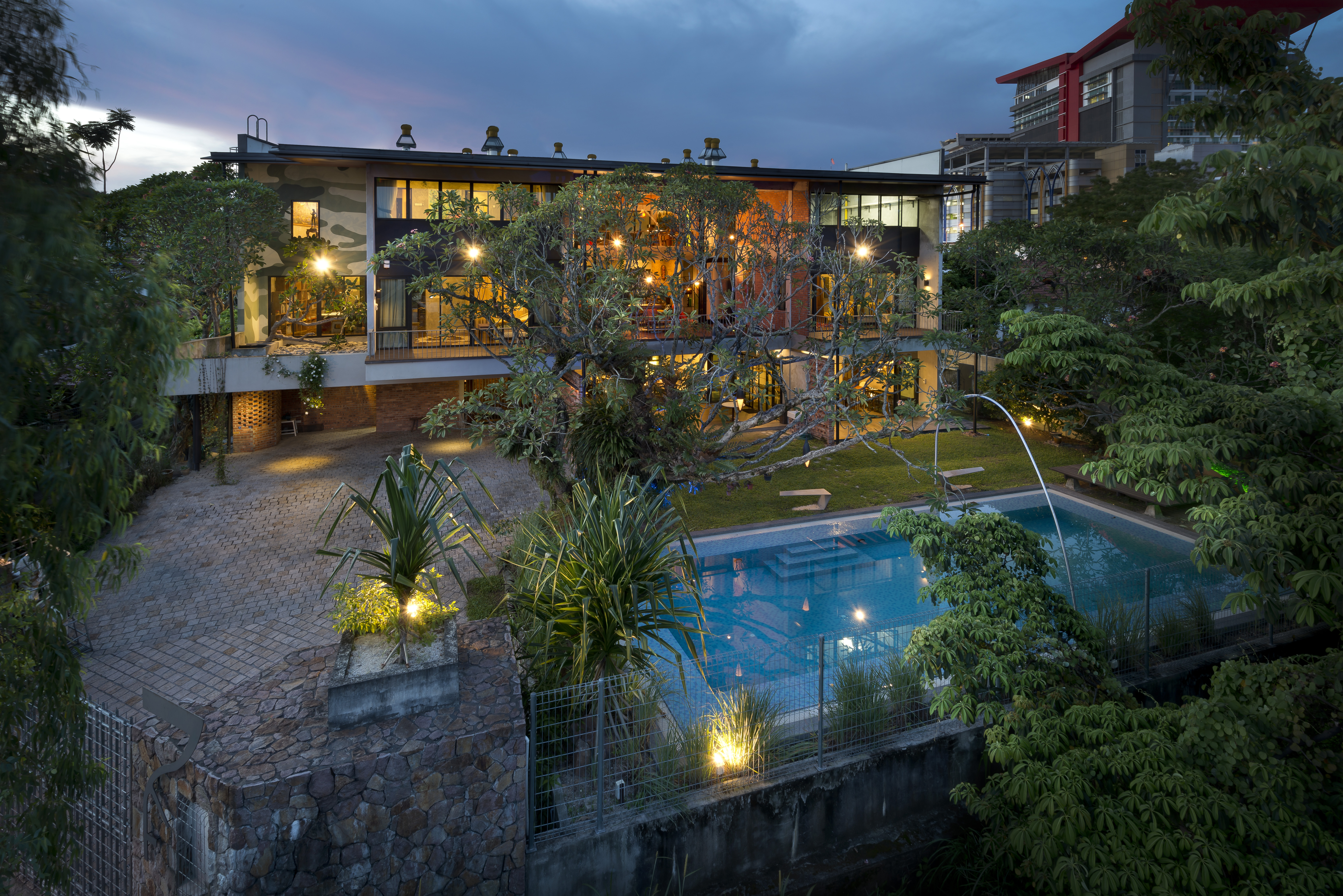
The S11 House is the first GBI platinum rated green house in Malaysia.

== Exhibitions ==
- 2010, Aug – Nov, The Green Tower – Remixed, Venice Biennale Architettura 2010, Venice, Italy
- 2012, Aug – Oct, PAX2012, Putra Architectural Exhibition, Galeri Serdang, University Putra Malaysia, Kuala Lumpur
- 2012, Aug – Nov, Air Craft – Malaysian Voices, Venice Biennale Architettura 2012, Common Ground, Venice, Italy
- 2013, March, Air Craft – Malaysian Voices, Venice Biennale 2013 Malaysia Pavilion, University Putra Malaysia
- 2013, 26–28 April, Architecture For All, Werdhapura Village, Sanur-Bali, Indonesia
- 2013, 19–22 June, KLAF 2013 – PAM Model Exhibition “Ineffable Space”, Kuala Lumpur Convention Centre, Kuala Lumpur, Malaysia
- 2013, 22–27 October, [KIA] 100 Architects of the Year 2013, Dongdaemun History and Culture Park, Seoul, Korea
- 2014, 1–4 May, PAM-HOMEDEC Awards for Residential Renovation, Gold Recipient, ArchiCentre Sdn Bhd - A Solo
- Exhibition, Kuala Lumpur Convention Centre, Kuala Lumpur, Malaysia
- 2014, 1–4 May, Exhibition Preview of Sufficiency – 14 th International Architecture Exhibition, Venice Biennale 2014 -
- Malaysia Pavilion, Kuala Lumpur Convention Centre, Kuala Lumpur, Malaysia
- 2014, June – Nov, The T-Colony – Sufficiency, Venice Biennale Architettura 2014, Venice, Italy
- 2015, January, The T-Colony – Sufficiency, VB2014 Returning Exhibition at Taylors University Gallery, Petaling Jaya
- 2015, 12–15 August, KLAF 2015 – PAM Model Exhibition “Eccentric Spaces Or Details” at Kuala Lumpur Convention Centre, Kuala Lumpur, Malaysia
- 2015, 21–25 Oct, [KIA] 100 Architects of the Year 2015, Culture Station Seoul 284, Seoul, Korea
- 2016, 25–30 July, KLAF 2016 – PAM Architectural Exhibition “ Future Communities” at PAM Center, Jalan Tanduk, Bangsar, Kuala Lumpur, Malaysia (in conjunction with KLAF 2016 and soft launch of new PAM Center Jln Tandok)
