= Magnum Berhad =

Malaysian gambling company

- Formerly: Multi-Purpose Holdings Berhad
- Type: Public
- Traded as: MYX: 3859
- ISIN: MYL3859OO005
- Industry: Gambling
- Founded: 18 August 1975; 51 years ago
- Headquarters: Kuala Lumpur, Malaysia
- Key people: Tan Sri Dato’ Surin Upatkoon, Non-Independent Non-Executive Chairman Dato’ Lawrence Lim Swee Lin, Non-Independent Executive Director Krian Upatkoon, Non-Independent Executive Director
- Website: www.magnum.com.my

Magnum Berhad is a Malaysian public listed investment holding company whose main operating subsidiary, Magnum Corporation Sdn. Bhd., operates a licensed four-digit numbers forecast betting business in Malaysia.

The company is listed on the Main Market of Bursa Malaysia under the stock code 3859. Magnum was incorporated in 1975 as Multi-Purpose Holdings Berhad and assumed its current name in 2013.

Magnum Corporation Sdn. Bhd. was founded in 1968 and became the first private company in Malaysia to receive a license to operate four-digit numbers forecast betting. Magnum Berhad was incorporated separately on 18 August 1975 as Multi-Purpose Holdings Berhad and was listed on the Main Market of Bursa Malaysia on 11 January 1982.

In 2007, Multi-Purpose Holdings proposed a privatization of Magnum Corporation Berhad that valued the transaction at RM4.9 billion. Under the proposed structure, Multi-Purpose would hold 51 percent of the privatized entity and CVC Asia Pacific would hold 49 percent.

In 2011, Multi-Purpose Holdings proposed to acquire the remaining 49 percent stake Magnum Holdings Sdn. Bhd. from CVC Asia Pacific and management shareholders for RM1.637 billion.

In 2013, Multi-Purpose Holding completed a demerger of its gaming and non-gaming businesses. The company assumed the name Magnum Berhad on 28 June 2013.

== Operations ==
Magnum Berhad operates through two main segments: gaming, and investment holdings and others. Its gaming business is conducted through Magnum Corporation Sdn. Bhd. which holds a license to operate four-digit numbers forecast betting and related games.

Magnum Corporation's game portfolio includes 4D Classic, 4D Jackpot, 4D Jackpot Gold, and Magnum Life.

== Financial performance ==
For the second quarter ended 30 June 2025, Magnum recorded revenue of RM570.76 million and net profit of RM62.13 million. For the first half of 2025, revenue was RM1.22 billion and net profit was RM111.9 million.

== Regulatory and legal issues ==
In 2024, the Alor Setar High Court ruled against the Kedah state government's decision to stop approving new business premises licenses and renewing existing business licenses for licenses pool betting outlets. STM Lottery Sdn. Bhd. and Magnum Corporation Sdn. Bhd. described the ruling as significant for licensed numbers forecast operators and the licensed pool betting business in Kedah.

In December 2025, the Court of Appeal upheld the Kedah High Court's ruling in a 2-1 decision, leaving in place the decision reversing the Kedah state government's statewide lottery outlet ban.
