= 1920 New Year Honours =

British honour awards

The New Year Honours 1920 were appointments by King George V to various orders and honours to reward and highlight good works by members of the British Empire. They were published on 1 January 1920 and 30 March 1920 (referred to as the 1920 civilian war honours).

The recipients of honours are displayed here as they were styled before their new honour, and arranged by honour, with classes (Knight, Knight Grand Cross, etc.) and then divisions (Military, Civil, etc.) as appropriate.

== British Empire ==
=== Earl ===
- The Right Honourable Sir William St. John Fremantle Brodrick, Viscount Midleton, KP.

=== Barons ===
- Sir Bertrand Edward Dawson, GCVO, CB, , FRCP, Physician-in-Ordinary to The King; Physician, London Hospital; Dean, Faculty of Medicine and Member of Senate, University of London; Chairman of Consultative Council, Ministry of Health. For public services in connection with health matters.
- Sir George Allardice Riddell, Bart., Vice-chairman of Newspaper Proprietors' Association, Ltd.; in charge of all the British Press and Colonial Press throughout the Peace Conference in Paris. For public services.
- The Right Honourable Sir Albert Henry Stanley, MP, late President of the Board of Trade.

=== Privy Counsellors ===
- The Honourable Charles Joseph Doherty, KC, DCL, LLD, Canadian Representative at the Peace Conference.
- Lieutenant-Colonel Sir Arthur Sackville Trevor Griffith-Boscawen, JP, , MP, Parliamentary-Secretary to Ministry of Pensions, 1916–1919, and since to the Board of Agriculture and Fisheries.
- Captain the Honourable Frederick Edward Guest, CBE, DSO, MP, Joint Parliamentary Secretary to the Treasury since 1917.
- Sir Frederick John Dealtry Lugard, GCMG, CB, DSO, late Governor-General of Nigeria.
- The Honourable Arthur Lewis Sifton, KC, MA, LLB, DCL, Canadian Representative at Peace Conference.
- The Honourable William Alexander Watt, Acting Prime Minister of the Commonwealth of Australia during absence of the Prime Minister at the Peace Conference.
- The Honourable Sir William Thomas White, KCMG, Acting Prime Minister of the Dominion of Canada during absence of the Prime Minister at the Peace Conference.

Ireland

- Samuel Cunningham, Member of recent Housing Committee on Finance.
- Martin Henry Fitzpatrick Morris, Baron Killanin, late Chairman of the Committee on Irish Primary Education.
- James Macmahon, Under-Secretary for Ireland.

=== Baronets ===
- Sir Henry Birchenough, KCMG. For valuable services rendered to the Ministry of Reconstruction and the Board of Trade.
- James Buchanan, JP for the Counties of Sussex and Ross-shire; High Sheriff in 1910 of the County of Sussex. For public and local services.
- Sir William Ernest Cain. Most generous supporter of Hospitals and War Charities in Liverpool.
- John Traill Cargill, Chairman, Burmah Oil Company; Director Anglo-Persian Oil Company. For public services.
- Felix Cassel, KC, Judge Advocate-General.
- Hugo Cunliffe-Owen. Vice-chairman of the British-American Tobacco Company. For valuable war service in connection with propaganda work in the Far East.
- Commander Sir Arthur Trevor Dawson, MICE, MIME, Royal Navy. For public services in connection with the Home Office, War Office, and Admiralty.
- Edward Mackay Edgar, head of firm of Sperling & Co., Merchant Bankers, Moorgate Street, London. For public services, particularly in connection with British and Canadian Trade.
- Walter Harry Evans. For services in connection with the War Savings Committee.
- Sir Thomas William Holderness, GCB, KCSI, Permanent Under-Secretary of State for India.
- John Latta. For public services in connection with Ministry of Shipping during the war.
- Sir Samuel Hardman Lever, KCB, Treasury Representative at Ministry of Transport.
- Frederick Orr Lewis, President of Lewis Bros. Ltd., Montreal. Undertook important work for British Admiralty during war. For public services.
- Sir Erik Olaf Ohlson, Sheriff of Hull, 1913–1915. For public services undertaken at the request of the Foreign Office in connection with Propaganda during the war.
- The Right Honourable Sir Henry Augustus Robinson, KCB, Vice-President of Irish Local Government Board.
- Lieutenant-Colonel Robert Arthur Sanders, MP, Junior Lord of the Treasury, 1919; Vice-chairman of the National War Aims Committee. For public and parliamentary services.
- Arthur Wheeler. For work in connection with War Loans. For public and local services.
- David Wilson,. For public services to Agriculture in Scotland for 35 years.
- Colonel John Roper Wright, JP, DL, Glamorganshire.

=== Knights Bachelor ===
- Alderman Andrew Beattie, Deputy Lieutenant for the City of Dublin.
- Alfred Frederick Bird, MP. For services rendered during the War in re-organisation of Overseas Officers' Clubs; also in connection with Discharged Sailors and Soldiers and Old Age Pensioners.
- Arthur Cecil Tyrrell Beck, MP. JP for Huntingdonshire and Bedfordshire, Parliamentary Secretary and Controller of Finance to the Ministry of National Service, 1917–19. For public and parliamentary services.
- Ernest A. Wallis Budge, MA, Litt.D., D.Litt., FSA, Oriental Professor, Head of Egyptian and Assyrian Departments of the British Museum.
- William Carter, Mayor of Windsor during the War. For public and local services.
- Harry Cartmell, Mayor of Preston, 1913–19. For public and local services.
- Samuel Chapman. For valuable war work, especially in connection with Perth and Perthshire Prisoners of War Fund. For public and local services.
- Colonel William Alfred Churchman. For public services in connection with the Ministry of Munitions Explosives Department.
- Josiah Court, MRCS, LRCP. JP for Derbyshire; Consulting Surgeon to the Derbyshire Miners' Union in Compensation cases; Surgeon to the Staveley Great Central Railwaymen.
- Edwin Wood Thorpe Farley, Mayor of Dover, 1913–19. For public and local services.
- Alderman John Fitzgerald, Lord Mayor of Newcastle, 1914–15. For public and local services.
- Norris Tildesley Foster. For services in connection with the Prince of Wales's Fund; Member of Parliamentary Recruiting Committee. Member of Local Appeal Tribunal.
- George Jefford Fowler. For 30 years Chief Magistrate for Kingston. For public and local services.
- Dr. Henry John Gauvain. For services rendered to the Cripples' Hospital at Alton.
- Francis Nugent Greer, CB, KC, Irish Parliamentary Draughtsman.
- Philip Herbert Hanson, CB, Director-General of Contracts; Head of American Department and representative of Ministry of Munitions in Paris.
- Thomas Jaffrey. JP for Aberdeenshire; Actuary to Aberdeen Savings Bank since 1892. For public and local services.
- Robert Newbald Kay, Sheriff of York, 1914–15; Chairman of Recruiting Committee. For public and local services.
- James Kemnal, Fellow of the Royal Society of Edinburgh. For public services in connection with the manufacture of Munitions.
- Halford John Mackinder, MP. For public and parliamentary services.
- James Macklin, Mayor of Salisbury for five years. For public and local services.
- Major David Hughes Morgan, Six times Mayor of Tenby. For public and local services.
- George William Needham, President of Oldham Royal Infirmary and Oldham Branch of St. John's Ambulance Association. For public and local services.
- Thomas Neill, JP, Chairman of the Ministry of Health Consultative Council on Health Insurance Approved Societies.
- Francis Grant Ogilvie, CB, Assistant Controller in Trench Warfare Research Department, Chemical Warfare Department. For public services.
- Alderman Herbert John Ormond, JP, Mayor of Stoke Newington, 1914–19. For public and local services.
- Colonel James Philip Reynolds, DSO, Deputy Lieutenant and JP for Lancashire. For public and local services.
- Hugh Malcolm Robinson, CB, ISO, Chief Inspector of Factories.
- Thomas Robinson, OBE, JP, MP. For public and parliamentary services.
- Leonard Bromfield Rowland, JP, Mayor of Wrexham, 1915–19. For public and local services.
- Professor Arthur Schuster, FRS, late Secretary of the Royal Society.
- Alderman Charles Stone. Nine times Mayor of Greenwich. For public and local services.
- James Richard Thursfield, MA. Author; Fellow and Tutor of Jesus College, Oxford; prominent Member of Navy Records Society.
- Alfred George Temple, FSA, Director of Guildhall Gallery for 32 years.
- Lieutenant-Colonel William Abraham Wayland, JP, Mayor of Deptford, 1914–19. For public and local services.
- Major Nevile Rodwell Wilkinson, CVO, Ulster King of Arms.

India

- Mr. Justice Nalini Ranjan Chatterji, Judge, High Court, Calcutta, Bengal.
- Mr. Justice Basanta Kumar Mullick, Indian Civil Service, Judge, Patna High Court, Bihar and Orissa.
- Charles Henry Kesteven, Solicitor to the Government of India, Calcutta.
- Malcolm Nicholson Hogg, Partner in Forbes, Forbes, Campbell & Co., Bombay.
- Thomas Joseph Strangman, Advocate General, Bombay.
- Robert Stanes, Merchant, Madras.
- Percy Wilson Newson, Senior Partner, Jardine, Skimier & Co., Calcutta, Bengal.
- Robert Taylor, Senior Partner in the firm of John Taylor & Sons, London, and Director of the Mysore Gold Mining Company Limited, London.

=== Order of the Bath ===
==== Knights Grand Cross of the Order of the Bath (GCB) ====
Civil Division

- Sir John Swanwick Bradbury, KCB, Principal Reparations Commissioner for British Government.
- The Right Honourable Sir David Harrel, GBE, KCB, KCVO, ISO, Chairman of Interim Court of Arbitration, 1918–1919; in connection with Industrial questions.
- The Right Honourable Sir James Rennell Rodd, GCMG, GCVO, CB, until recently British Ambassador at Rome.

==== Knights Commander of the Order of the Bath (KCB) ====
Military Division

Royal Navy

- Vice-Admiral Robert John Prendergast, CB.
- Rear-Admiral Henry Harvey Bruce, CB, MVO.

Civil Division

- George Lewis Barstow, CB, Controller of Supply Services, Treasury.
- Sydney John Chapman, CB, CBE, FRS, Joint Permanent Secretary, Board of Trade.
- James Henry Brooks, Esq., CB, Director of Victualling, Admiralty.
- Henry Noel Bunbury, Esq., CB, Accountant General and Financial Adviser to Ministry of Shipping.
- Bertram Blakiston Cubitt, Esq., CB, Assistant Secretary, War Office.
- Sir Richard Tetley Glazebrook, CB, late Director, National Physical Laboratory.
- Sir Claud Schuster, CVO, Permanent Secretary to the Lord Chancellor.

==== Companions of the Order of the Bath (CB) ====
Military Division

Royal Navy

- Captain Eric John Arthur Fullerton, DSO.

Army

- Colonel Thomas Francis Bruce Renny-Tailyour, CSI, late Royal Engineers.
- Lieutenant-Colonel (temporary Colonel) Francis William Hallowes, CIE, Indian Army.

Civil Division

- Captain Edgar Abraham, Assistant Secretary, Cabinet Secretariat.
- Charles Reginald Brigstocke, Assistant Secretary, Air Ministry.
- George William Chrystal, Secretary to Ministry of Pensions.
- Frank Lewis Dumbell Elliott, an Assistant Commissioner of the Metropolitan Police.
- Sir William Gallagher, ISO, a Commissioner of Customs and Excise.
- Walter George Gates, Assistant Secretary, General Post Office.
- William Montagu Graham-Harrison, Second Parliamentary Counsel.
- George Frederick Howe, Presiding Special Commissioner of Income Tax.
- Charles Knight, Esq., Assistant Secretary, Ministry of Health.
- Ernest Philip Alphonso Law, Esq., Historian at Hampton Court Palace.
- Gordon Ambrose de Lisle Lee, Esq., York Herald, College of Arms.
- Thomas Lodge, Esq., Secretary, Ministry of Shipping.
- Charles Hubert Montgomery, Esq., CVO, Chief Clerk, Foreign Office.
- James Wallace Peck, Esq., Senior Assistant Secretary to Ministry of Food.
- Arthur Charles Pedley, Esq., ISO, Principal, War Office.
- William Samuel Sarel, Esq., CBE, an Assistant Accountant-General of the Navy.
- Wilfred Maurice Short, Esq., Secretary to the Right Hon. A. J. Balfour, O.M., M.P.
- Herbert John Simmonds, Esq., OBE, an Assistant Secretary to the Board of Education.
- Samuel Watt, Esq., Private Secretary to successive Chief Secretaries for Ireland

=== Order of the Star of India ===
==== Knights Commander of the Order of the Star of India (KCSI) ====
- The Right Honourable Sir Francis John Stephens Hopwood, Baron Southborough, GCB, GCMG.
- Lieutenant-Colonel His Highness Maharaja Daolat Singhji, Maharaja of Idar, Bombay.
- Diwan Bahadur Penungavur Rajagopala Achariyar Avargal, CIE, Member of the Council of His Excellency the Governor, Madras.

==== Companions of the Order of the Star of India (CSI) ====
- Charles George Todhunter, Indian Civil Service, Member of the Council of His Excellency the Governor, Madras.
- Alexander Phillips Muddiman, CIE, Indian Civil Service, Secretary to the Government of India, Legislative Department.
- Frederick Campbell Rose, MICE, Secretary to the Government of India, Public Works Department.
- Selwyn Howe Fremantle, CIE, VD, Indian Civil Service, Controller of Passages, United Provinces.
- Peter William Monie, Indian Civil Service, Municipal Commissioner, Bombay.

=== Order of Saint Michael and Saint George ===
==== Knight Grand Cross of the Order of St Michael and St George (GCMG) ====
- Sir Eyre Crowe, KCB, KCMG, Assistant Under Secretary of State for Foreign Affairs.

==== Knights Commander of the Order of St Michael and St George (KCMG) ====
- Lieutenant-Colonel Charles Richard Mackey O'Brien, CMG, Governor and Commander-in-Chief of the Island of Barbados.
- The Honourable William Herbert Herries, Minister of Railways and Native Affairs, Dominion of New Zealand.
- Sir Robert Randolph Garran, Kt, CMG, Secretary to the Attorney-General's Department, Parliamentary Draftsman and Solicitor-General, Commonwealth of Australia.
- George Robert Parkin, , CMG. Organising Secretary, Rhodes Scholarship Trust.
- Samuel William Knaggs, CMG, late Colonial Secretary of the Colony of Trinidad and Tobago.
- Otto John Beit, for work in connection with South African Hospitals and Troops in England.
- Edgar Bonham-Carter, CMG, CIE, Senior Judicial Official in the Civil Administration of Mesopotamia.
- Frederick George Augustus Butler, CB, CMG, Director of the Overseas Division of the Department of Overseas Trade.
- Major-General Sir Percy Zachariah Cox, GCIE, KCSI, His Majesty's Representative at Tehran.

Additional Knight Commander

- Rear-Admiral Richard Webb, CB. In recognition of valuable services rendered during the later stages of the War.

==== Companions of the Order of St Michael and St George (CMG) ====
- The Honourable Bolton Stafford Bird, Member of the Legislative Council of the State of Tasmania.
- Lieutenant-Colonel James Forrest Halkett Carmichael, CBE, Chief Engineer, Office of the Crown Agents for the Colonies.
- Lieutenant-Colonel William Thomas Frederick Davies, MD, DSO, Member of the House of Assembly of the Union of South Africa.
- Percy Edgar Deane, for services in connection with the Peace Conference.
- Herbert George de Lisser, of Jamaica, in recognition of his public services and literary work.
- John Robert Innes, lately Judicial Commissioner, Federated Malay States.
- Ernest Frederick Cambridge Lane, for services in connection with the Peace Conference.
- Lieutenant-Commander John Greig Latham, for services in connection with the Peace Conference.
- The Honourable Maui Pomare, Member of the Executive Council, Dominion of New Zealand.
- Charles Edward Owen Smyth, ISO, Superintendent of Public Buildings, State of South Australia.
- Malcolm Stevenson, the Officer Administering the Government of the Island of Cyprus.
- Henry Nilus Thompson, Chief Conservator of Forests, Nigeria.
- Frank David Thomson, for services in connection with the Peace Conference.
- Hugh Cholmondeley Thornton, Private Secretary to the Secretary of State for the Colonies.
- Eric Clare Edmund Phipps, Counsellor of Embassy in His Majesty's Diplomatic Service.
- John Duncan Gregory, Senior Clerk in the Foreign Office.
- Hughe Montgomery Knatchbull-Hugessen, First Secretary in His Majesty's Diplomatic Service.
- The Honourable Harold George Nicolson, Second Secretary in His Majesty's Diplomatic Service.
- Robert MacLeod Hodgson, His Majesty's Consul at Vladivostok.
- George Herbert Mair, temporarily employed in the Foreign Office during the War.

Additional Companions

- Captain David Thomas Norris, CB, Royal Navy.
- Captain John Peter Ralph Marriott, Royal Navy.

=== Order of the Indian Empire ===
==== Knights Commander of the Order of the Indian Empire (KCIE) ====
- Honorary Second Lieutenant Meherban Malojirao Vyankatrav Raje Ghorpad alias Nanasaheb, Chief of Mudhol, Bombay Presidency.
- Walter Maude, CSI, Indian Civil Service, Member of the Executive Council, Bihar and Orissa.
- Rai Bahadur Sir Bipin Krishna Bose, CIE, Government Advocate, Nagpur, Central Provinces.
- Charles James Stevenson-Moore, CVO, Indian Civil Service, Member, Board of Revenue, Bengal.

==== Companions of the Order of the Indian Empire (CIE) ====
- Allan Thomas Holme, Indian Civil Service, Officiating Agent to the Governor General in Rajputana, and Chief Commissioner, Ajmer-Merwara.
- Sardar Bahadur Sardar Sundar Singh Majithia, Amritsar, Punjab.
- Henry Moncrieff Smith, Indian Civil Service, Joint Secretary to the Government of India, Legislative Department.
- Frederick St. John Gebbie, JP, Chief Secretary to the Government of Bombay, Public Works Department.
- Khan Bahadur Pir Baksh Walad Mian Muhammad, retired Deputy Collector, Sind, Bombay.
- Seshadri Srinivasa Ayyangar, Advocate General, Madras.
- Francis Arthur Addams Cowley, Chief Engineer and Secretary, Irrigation and Marine Department, Bengal.
- James Alexander Richey, Director of Public Instruction, Punjab.
- Frank Waverling Woods, Secretary to the Government of the Punjab, Public Works Department (Irrigation Branch).
- George Gall Sim, Indian Civil Service, United Provinces.
- Lieutenant-Colonel Charles Aitchison Smith, Indian Army, Political Agent, Gilgit, Kashmir State.
- Lieutenant-Colonel Frederick Ralph Nethersole, Indian Army, Deputy Commissioner, Tharrawaddy, Burma.
- Robert Scott Troup, Imperial Forest Service, lately Inspector-General of Forests.
- Matthew Alfred Thompson, Deputy Director-General, Telegraph Traffic, Punjab.
- Kinsey Beaumont Welford Thomas, Deputy Inspector-General of Police, Bengal.
- John Algernon Stevens, OBE, Indian Civil Service, Chief Collector of Customs, Rangoon, Burma.
- David Alexander Thomson, Imperial Forest Service, Deputy Conservator, Bombay.
- Alexander Brebner, Imperial Public Works Department, late Executive Engineer, Special Works Division, Bihar and Orissa.
- Vernon Dawson, Indian Civil Service.
- George Anderson, Indian Educational Service, Assistant Secretary to the Government of India in the Education Department.
- Colonel Rao Bahadur Thakur Sadul Singh, Member of Bikaner State Executive Council, Rajputana.
- Saiyid Niur-ul-Huda, Zamindar, Bihar and Orissa.
- Rao Bahadur Yeshwantrao Trimbak Mirikar, Sardar of the Deccan, Bombay.
- Rai Baikuntha Nath Sen Bahadur, Pleader, Murshidabad, Bengal.

=== Royal Victorian Order ===
==== Knights Grand Cross of the Royal Victorian Order (GCVO) ====
- The Right Honourable Sir George Herbert Murray, GCB, ISO.

==== Knights Commander of the Royal Victorian Order (KCVO) ====
- The Right Honourable Sir Horace Brooks Marshall.

==== Commanders of the Royal Victorian Order (CVO) ====
- Sir William Jameson Soulsby, CB, CIE.
- Sir James Bell.
- Brigadier-General Henry Edmund Burleigh Leach, CB, CMG.
- Brigadier-General Edmund William Costello, VC, CMG, DSO, Indian Army. (Dated 16 August 1919.)
- Brigadier-General Ernest Douglas Money, CIE, DSO, Indian Army. (Dated 31 August 1919.)
- Thomas Arthur Fitzhardinge Kingscote, MVO.
- Captain Houston French, MVO.
- Hugh Cholmondeley Thornton.

==== Members of the Royal Victorian Order, 4th class (MVO) ====
- Major Charles Ossley Harvey, MC, Indian Army.
- John Elkan.
- William Wyamar Vaughan.

==== Members of the Royal Victorian Order, 5th class (MVO) ====
- Eric John Glynne Evans.
- Christopher Lloyd.
- Henry Cecil Sumner Maine.
- Herbert Francis Montgomery.

=== Order of the British Empire ===
==== Dames Grand Cross of the Order of the British Empire (GBE) ====
- Mabell Frances Elizabeth, Dowager Countess of Airlie. President of Queen Alexandra's Army Nursing Board.
- Maud Evelyn, Marchioness of Lansdowne, C.I., C.H.
- Alice Edith, Countess of Reading

==== Knights Grand Cross of the Order of the British Empire (GBE) ====
- Sir Alexander Baird, Bt. President, Permanent Arbitration Board, Egypt.
- The Right Honourable Aretas, Viscount Chilston. Chief County Director, British Red Cross Society and Order of St. John.
- Brigadier-General Sir Alexander Gibb, K.B.E., C.B. Late Civil Engineer-in-Chief, Admiralty.
- Colonel Sir James Gildea, K.C.V.O., C.B. Founder and Chairman of the Sailors' and Soldiers' Families' Association.
- Sir Charles Harris, K.C.B. Assistant Financial Secretary, War Office.
- Sir Nathaniel Joseph Highmore, K.C.B. Assistant Director, War Trade Department.
- The Right Honourable Sir Robert Stevenson Horne, K.B.E., K.C., M.P. Minister of Labour.
- Sir Robert Molesworth Kindersley, K.B.E. Chairman, National War Savings Committee.
- Sir Harry Livesey, K.B.E. Late Director of Navy Contracts and subsequently Commissioner for Contract Policy, and Admiralty Representative on Lord Colwyn's Inter-departmental Committee.
- Sir Reginald, Earl of Meath, K.P.
- Sir Thomas Munro, K.B.E., D.L. Chairman of Provisional Joint Committee of Industrial Conference; Chief Adviser, Labour Regulation Department, Ministry of Munitions
- Sir John Denison-Pender, K.C.M.G. Managing Director of Eastern Telegraph Company.
- Edward Aurelian Ridsdale, Vice-chairman of Executive Committee, British Red Cross Society.
- Arthur Everett Shipley, F.R.S., LL.D., D.Sc. Vice-chancellor of Cambridge University.
- Sir Henry Babington Smith, C.H., K.C.B., C.S.I. Acted as Deputy to the Earl of Reading in the United States of America.

==== Dames Commander of the Order of the British Empire (DBE) ====
- Alice, Mrs. Chisholm, C.B.E. Voluntary worker, Soldiers' Club and Rest Camp, Kantara West.
- Janet Lucretia, Dowager Countess of Eglinton and Winton, LL.D., President, Ayrshire Branch, British Red Cross Society.
- Louise Beatrice Augusta, Countess of Gosford. President of the Central Workrooms, British Red Cross Society.
- Una Constance, Mrs. Pope-Hennessy. Central Prisoners of War Committee, British Red Cross Society.
- Catherine Reeve, Mrs. Hunt. Chairman of the Sailors' and Soldiers' Families' Association and Honorary Secretary of the Local War Pensions Committee, Colchester.
- Alice Emily, Countess of Leicester. President, Norfolk Branch, British Red Cross Society.
- Isabel Charlotte, Baroness Talbot de Malahide. President, County of Dublin Branch of the British Red Cross Society and of the Irish Joint Red Cross and St. John Executive Committee.
- Beryl Carnegy, Lady Oliver, C.B.E., R.R.C. Head of the Naval and Military V.A.D. Department, Devonshire House.
- Sybil Margaret, Dowager Viscountess Rhondda. Chairman of Women's Advisory Committee of National War Savings Committee.
- Clara, Mrs. Butt-Rumford. For ungrudging and patriotic service during the war.
- Louise Victoria, Mrs. Samuel, O.B.E. One of the founders of the War Refugees Committee in August, 1914.
- Ethel Mary Reader, Mrs. Shakespear, M.B.E., D.Sc. Honorary Secretary, Birmingham War Pensions Committee.
- Miss Meriel Lucy Talbot, Q.B.E. Director of Women's Branch, Board of Agriculture.
- Miss Sophia Gertrude Wintz. Superintendent of the Royal Sailors' Rests.

==== Knights Commander of the Order of the British Empire (KBE) ====
Military Division

Royal Navy

- Rear-Admiral Harry Hampson Stileman, CBE.
- Rear-Admiral Edward Henry Fitzhardinge Heaton-Ellis, CB, CBE, MVO.

Civil Division

- Westcott Stile Abell, Chief Surveyor to Lloyd's Register of Shipping.
- Martin Arnold Abrahamson, Vice-President and Chairman of the British Red Cross Society, Copenhagen Bureau; Commissioner for Repatriation of British Prisoners of War.
- Patrick Dalreagle Agnew, C.B.E. Vice-chairman and Managing Director, Central Prisoners of War Committee.
- Brigadier-General William Alexander, C.B., C.M.G., D.S.O., T.D. Director-General of Purchases, Ministry of Munitions, and Controller of Aircraft Supply.
- George Henry Ashdown, C.B.E., I.S.O. Director of Stores, Admiralty, and Admiralty Representative on International Petroleum Committee.
- Henry Walter Badock, C.S.I. Accountant-General, India Office.
- Thomas Baker, J.P. Ex-Mayor of Plymouth; for valuable war work.
- Isaac Bayley Balfour, LL.D, M.D., D.Sc., F.R.S. Professor of Botany, University of Edinburgh, Regius Keeper of Royal Botanic Gardens, Edinburgh.
- Captain Walter de Mouchet Baynham, R.D. Master, S.S. Ormonde
- Lieutenant-Colonel Samuel Henry Egerton Barraclough, C.B.E. In charge of Australian Munition Workers
- James Beattie, In charge of Jute Goods Depot and Honorary Director of Flax Office at Dundee, Department of the Surveyor-General of Supply, War Office; Managing Director, Messrs. A.& S. Henry & Co. Limited.
- Mayson Moss Beeton, For services in connection with the Newfoundland Forestry Corps.
- Sir Thomas Henry Devereux Berridge.
- Walter Wheeler Berry, J.P. Development Commissioner; representative of Board of Agriculture on the Hop Control Committee and on various other Committees; Member of Agricultural Advisory Council, etc.
- Arthur Ernest Blake, J.P. For work in connection with War Loan, Savings Banks and services on the Nottingham Parliamentary Recruiting Committee and Tribunal.
- William Henry Bragg, C.B.E., DSc., F.R.S. Quain Professor of Physics, University of London; Superintendent of Admiralty Experimental Station at Parkston.
- Harry Samuel Bickertom Brindley, Ministry of Munitions.
- Herbert Brown, Organiser of the British Farmers' Red Cross Fund.
- Joseph Burn, C.B.E. Member of National War Savings Committee.
- Cyril Kendall Butler, J.P. Chief British Representative, Inter-Allied Food and Relief Mission, Vienna.
- Gordon Huntly Campbell, Chairman, Collections Committee, British Red Cross Society and Order of St. John.
- Frederick William Chance, J.P., D.L. Chairman of Committee for State Purchase undertakings in the Carlisle Area.
- Captain James Thomas Walter Charles, C.B., C.B.E., R.D., R.N.R. Master, S.S. Aquitania.
- Captain Benjamin Chave, Master, S.S. Carisbrooke Castle.
- Robert Waley Cohen, Petroleum Adviser to the War Office
- Henry Arthur Colefax, K.C. For services rendered in connection with the Ministry of Munitions and Admiralty.
- James Currie, C.M.G. Director of Training, Ministry of Labour.
- Stephen Demetriadi, Partner and Managing Director of Messrs. Ralli Brothers; Assistant Secretary, Special Grants Committee, Ministry of Pensions.
- Raymond Herbert Dennis, Services in connection with the supply of motor lorries and fire engines.
- James Lyne Devonshire, Managing Director of London United Tramways, Ltd., and London and Suburban Electric Traction Co., Ltd.
- John Dewrance, Member of Engineering Employers' Consultative Committee, Ministry of Munitions; Vice-chairman, Managing Committee, Engineering Employers' Federation; Chairman, Messrs. Babcock & Wilcox, Ltd.
- William Henry Diamond, Services in South Wales in connection with Recruiting, War Savings, etc.
- Lieutenant-Commander Charles Edward Down, O.B.E., R.N.R. Marine Superintendent, Royal Mail Steam Packet Company.
- George Keith Buller Elphinstone, O.B.E. Head of Messrs. Elliott Bros., Westminster; valuable services in the design and manufacture of fire control apparatus for Navy.
- Commander Thomas Fisher, C.B.E., R.N. Representative of Ministry of Shipping in the U.S.A.
- Cecil Edwin Fitch, Services in connection with recruiting.
- Philip Horace Freeman, C.B.E. Honorary Secretary, Officers' Families' Fund.
- Major James German, O.B.E, J.P Services in connection with recruiting propaganda and war charities.
- Lieutenant-Colonel Walter Gibbons. Donor of a large number of Red Cross Ambulances to the British and French Authorities; Donor of Willesden Auxiliary Hospital.
- Philip Hamilton Gibbs, War Correspondent.
- William Henry Neville Goschen, O.B.E., Prominent Member and Chairman for 1918 of Joint Stock 'Bankers' Committee; valuable services on many Government Committees.
- Major Philip Lloyd-Greame, M.C, M.P. Conjoint Secretary, Ministry of National Service. (Later Philip Cunliffe-Lister, 1st Earl of Swinton)
- Arnold Babb Gridley, Services as Electrical Adviser to Government Departments.
- Sidney Frederic Harmer, D.Sc., F.R.S. Director of Natural History Departments and Keeper of Zoology, British Museum.
- Austin Edward Harris, Late Assistant Surveyor-General of Supply, War Office; Chairman of the Contracts Advisory Committee and Contracts Board.
- Ernest Maes Harvey, Treasury Representative with British Commission to Russia.
- Walter Risley Hearn, His Majesty's Consul-General in Paris.
- Sir Cecil Hertslet, His Majesty's Consul-General for Belgium; Chairman of Belgian Trade Committee.
- Major James William Beeman Hodsdon, C.B.E., M.D., F.R.C.S, Member of Medical Advisory Board, Ministry of National Service.
- Alan Hutchings, O.B.E. Secretary of Department of Director-General of Voluntary Organisations.
- George Lawson Johnston, Member of Leather Control Board, Department of the Surveyor-General of Supply, War Office.
- Bertram Hyde Jones, Civil Assistant to Controller-General of Equipment, War Office.
- Karl Fredrik Knudsen, Representative of Norwegian Shipowners on Neutral Tonnage Conference.
- Captain George Edward Wickham Legg, M.V.O. Secretary of the Sailors' and Soldiers' Families' Association.
- Frederick Lobnitz, D.L., J.P. Director of Munitions in Scotland.
- Brigadier-General George Charles, Earl of Lucan, C.B., Head of Wounded and Missing Enquiry Department, British Red Cross Society.
- Thomas Callan Macardle, J.P., D.L., Chairman of the Louth Recruiting Committee, and pioneer of the Irish Tillage Movement.
- Frederick Larkins Macleod, C.B.E. Adviser on Foreign Iron Ores, Ministry of Munitions
- The Honourable Malcolm Martin Macnaghten, K.C. Director of the Foreign Claims Office.
- Hector Murray Macneal, For valuable services rendered to the Ministry of Shipping.
- Alfred Mansfield, C.B.E. Director of Oils and Fats, Ministry of Food.
- Basil Edgar Mayhew, Secretary of Finance Department and Secretary of the Central Demobilisation Board, British Red Cross Society.
- George Metcalfe, C.B.E, J.P. Representative of Stock Exchange on American Dollar Securities Committee.
- John Joseph Mooney, J.P. Member of Advisory Committee on Repatriation and Internment of Aliens.
- George Murray, Casualties Branch, War Office.
- Thomas Drysdale Nicol, Controller and Financial Adviser, Aircraft Contracts, Ministry of Munitions, services in connection with Disposals Board.
- Commander Franke Bartlett Stuart Notley, R.D., R.N.R. Marine Superintendent, Peninsular and Oriental Steam Navigation Company Ltd.
- Charles William Chadwick Oman, LL.D., M.P. Chichele Professor of Modern History, Oxford University; services rendered to Foreign Office in connection with historical research.
- Arthur Eugene O'Neill, C.B.E. Voluntary services in Requisitioning Branch, Ministry of Shipping.
- Edward Hussey Packe, Private Secretary to successive First Lords of the Admiralty.
- Alfred Vaughan Paton, President of the Liverpool Cotton Association.
- Joseph Ernest Petavel, D.Sc., F.R.S. Chairman of Aero-Dynamics Sub-Committee of the Advisory Committee on Aeronautics.
- William Petersen, Chairman of British Committee of the International Shipping Registry.
- Percival Phillips, Senior War Correspondent on the Western Front during the War.
- George Walter Prothero, Litt.D., LL.D. Head of Historical Section, Foreign Office, and Editor of the series of Handbooks compiled for use at the Peace Conference.
- Captain James Robert Rae, O.B.E. Master, S.S.City of Exeter.
- Ernest Manifold Raeburn, C.B.E. Head of the Ministry of Shipping in New York.
- Harry Benedetto Renwick, Late Director of Feeding Stuffs Department, Ministry of Flood; Chairman and Managing Director of County of London Electric Supply Company Ltd.
- Harry Perry Robinson, War Correspondent of "The Times."
- Herbert Thomas Robson, President of the Board of Directors of the Wheat Export Co., New York.
- Major-General Richard Matthews Ruck, C.B., C.M.G. Vice-chairman of Air Inventions Committee.
- Herbert William Henry Russell, War Correspondent of Reuter's and the Press Association.
- Sir Archibald Tutton James Salvidge, J.P. For public services in Liverpool.
- Edward Marlay Samson, O.B.E., K.C. Recorder of Swansea; Chairman of South Wales and Monmouthshire Joint War Pensions Committee.
- Charles John Ough Sanders, C.B.E. Chairman of Shipbuilding Employers' Federation.
- William Schooling, C.B.E. Member of the National War Savings Committee.
- William Anker Simmons, C.B.E., J.P. Agricultural Adviser, Ministry of Food.
- Mortimer Singer, J.P. Donor and Organiser, Milton Hill Auxiliary Hospital, Steventon, Berkshire.
- Lieutenant-Commander Sampson Sladen, R.N. Late Chief Officer, London Fire Brigade.
- Thomas Smethurst, J.P. Chairman of Manchester War Savings Committee; ex-Lord Mayor of Manchester.
- Malcolm Smith, J.P. Ex-Provost of Leith.
- Harold Edward Snagge, For work in connection with the Ministry of Information.
- Arthur Munro Sutherland, Ex-Lord Mayor of Newcastle.
- John Swaish, D.L., J.P. Lord Mayor of Bristol, 1914-1915.
- Major Robert William Tate, C.B.E. Fellow of Trinity College, Dublin; Officer Commanding Trinity College O.T.C.
- William Beach Thomas, War Correspondent of the Daily-Mail.
- Percy Thompson, C.B. Deputy Chairman, Board of Inland Revenue.
- Thomas George Owens Thurston, Services in connection with Admiralty Inventions; Managing Director of the Forth Engineering and Shipbuilding Co. Ltd.
- Captain William Hugh Tomasson, C.B.E., M.V.O Chief Constable of Nottinghamshire.
- Joseph Turner, J.P. Managing Director, British Dyes, Ltd.
- Brevet Lieutenant-Colonel David Wallace, C.M.G., C.B.E., M.B., F.R.C.S. Organiser and Consulting and Operating Surgeon, Dalmeny House Auxiliary Hospital; Red Cross Commissioner and Military Inspection Officer to Auxiliary Hospitals.
- Nicholas Edwin Waterhouse, Director of Costings, War Office; Partner in Messrs. Price, Waterhouse & Co.
- Lawrence Weaver, C.B.E. Commercial Secretary to Board of Agriculture.
- Brevet Colonel Arthur Lisle Ambrose Webb, C.B., C.M.G. Director-General of Medical Services, Ministry of Pensions.
- Captain Maynard Francis Colchester-Wemyss, C.B.E. County Director, Auxiliary Hospitals and V.A.D.'s, Gloucestershire Branch, British Red Cross Society; late Head of the Food Control for Auxiliary Hospitals; Deputy Chairman, Red Cross Central Demobilisation Board; High Sheriff of Gloucestershire.
- Frederick James Willis, C.B. Assistant Secretary, Ministry of Health.
- Colonel William Charles Wright, C.B Director of Baldwins, Ltd., and Port Talbot Steel Company, Ltd

For services rendered on behalf of the Dominions, Crown Colonies, Protectorates, etc., and in connection with the War.

- Sir Ernest Frederick George Hatch, Bart., Chairman of Council, "Beyond Seas" Association for the Reception of Officers and Relatives from beyond the seas.
- The Honourable Robert Heaton Rhodes, for services as New Zealand Red Cross Commissioner in England, and in connection with the welfare of the troops of the Dominion.

Honorary Knight Commander

- His Excellency Zulfikar Pasha, Grand Chamberlain to His Highness the Sultan of Egypt. For services rendered in Egypt.

==== Commanders of the Order of the British Empire (CBE) ====
Civil Division

- Major (temporary Lieutenant-Colonel) Alexander Elder Beattie, MC, Staff Officer, West African Frontier Force.
- The Honourable Alicia Margaret Cecil, MBE, in recognition of services in connection with women's emigration.
- Caroline Susan Theodora, The Honourable Mrs. Norman Grosvenor, in recognition of services in connection with women's emigration.
- The Honourable Ellen Joyce, Vice-President, British Women's Emigration Association.
- Grace Lefroy, Honorary Secretary, British Women's Emigration Association.
- Frank Campbell McClellan, Director of Agriculture, and lately Chief Supply Officer, Zanzibar Protectorate.
- Lucy Bertram, Lady Markham, for services in the entertainment of Officers of the Oversea Forces.
- Christopher Lintrup Paus, OBE, Commercial Attaché, HM Embassy, Christiania

Civilian war CBE honours list, 30 March 1920

==== Officers of the Order of the British Empire (OBE) ====
Civil Division

- Captain and Quartermaster Richard Alexander Barber, Royal Engineers, Clerk to the Overseas Defence Committee.
- Bimbashi Robert Arthur Langdale Kelham, Alexandria City Police. For services rendered in Egypt.

Civilian war OBE honours list, 30 June 1920

==== Members of the Order of the British Empire (MBE) ====
Civil Division

Civilian war MBE honours list, 30 June 1920

=== Kaisar-i-Hind Medals ===
First Class

- The Honourable Mary Harriet Hepburn Scott, Missionary, Church of Scotland Mission, Kalimpong, Bengal.
- Atwell Lake Alexander, Chairman of the Municipal Council, Tellicherry, Malabar District, Madras.
- William James Wanless, Principal Medical Officer of the Mission Hospital at Miraj and Chief Medical Officer of the American Presbyterian Mission, Bombay.
- Doctor Kate Platt, Principal of the Lady Hardinge Medical College for Women, Delhi.
- Doctor Margaret Ida Balfour, Joint Secretary, to the Central Committee of the Countess of Dufferin's Fund.
- Ida Sophia Scudder, Doctor in charge of the Mary Taber Schell Hospital, Vellore, North Arcot District, Madras.
- Rani Murari Kumari Debi, of Bhinga, Bahraich District, United Provinces.
- Mary Eliza Annie Fosbrooke, Inspectress of Schools, Assam.
- The Reverend Ola Hanson, American Baptist Mission, Namkham, Burma.
- Reverend Mother Simon, Superior of the Franciscan Sisters, Punjab Lunatic Asylum, Lahore, Punjab.

=== Promotions ===
Dated 31 December 1919.

Royal Navy

Commander to Captain

- Gerald L. Parnell, DSO, OBE.
- Morshead B. Baillie-Hamilton.
- Frederick E. K. Strong, DSO.
- Henry G. L. Oliphant, DSO, MVO.
- Gerald C. Dickens, CMG.
- Gilbert G. P. Hewett.
- Cecil P. Talbot, DSO.
- Edward M. Bennett, OBE.
- Robert G. Hamond, DSO.
- Hugh S. Shipway.
- Charles D. Burke.
- Frederic E. B. G. Schreiber.
- The Hon. Edward B. S. Bingham, VC, OBE.
- Dudley B. N. North, CMG, MVO.
- Noel F. Laurence, DSO.
- Andrew B. Cunningham, DSO.

Lieutenant-Commander to Commander

- Arthur C. Fawssett, DSO.
- Rolf Viney.
- Thomas G. Carter, OBE.
- Henry H. G. D. Stoker, DSO.
- John F. Hutchings, DSO.
- Delorest J. D. Noble.
- Edward O. Broadley, DSO.
- James C. J. Soutter.
- Ernest R. Gloag.
- James R. C. Cavendish.
- Lionel G. Foote.
- Frank H. T. Ree.
- Claud M. Leggatt.
- Arthur J. L. Murray, DSO.
- Hugh J. Woodward, DSO.
- Harold T. Bowen.
- Thomas C. C. Bolster, DSO.
- Roger L. Wiles.
- Harry B. Jermain, OBE.
- Cecil E. Brooke.
- Algernon R. Smithwick, DSO.
- Arthur W. Brooks, DSO.
- Lancelot E. Holland.
- Gordon C. Wilkinson.
- Claud L. Y. Dering, DSO.
- Henry R. Moore, DSO.
- Arnold Maitland-Dougall.
- Ronald W. Oldham, OBE.
- Louis H. B. Bevan.
- Charles O. Alexander.
- Richard B. Davies, VC, DSO.
- Edward L. S. King.
- Arthur F. Pridham.
- Eric R. Bent, DSC.
- Henry E. C. Blagrove.

Engineer Captain to Engineer Rear-Admiral

- Robert B. Dixon, CB. (Dated 13 December 1919.)

Engineer Commander to Engineer Captain

- William Hart, OBE. (Dated 30 September 1919.)
- Sydney M. G. Bryer. (Dated 13 December 1919.)

Paymaster Commander to Paymaster Captain

To date from 1 January 1920.

- Horatio O. Jones (now acting Paymaster Captain).
- John A. Keys, CB. (now acting Paymaster Captain).
- Theodore T. Lanyon (now acting Paymaster Captain).
- Reginald C. Baker (now acting Paymaster Captain).
- Francis C. Leonard (now acting Paymaster Captain).
- Charles F. Pollard, CB, CMG.

Royal Naval Reserve

Commander to Captain

Dated 31 December 1919.

- Robert H. W. Hughes, CSI, CMG, DSO, RD.
- Arthur E. Dunn, CBE, RD.
- Charles E. Irving, RD.
- Henry G. Muir, DSO, RD.

Lieutenant-Commander to Commander

Dated 31 December 1919.

- Reginald V. Peel, RD.
- Frederick R. Miles, RD.
- Leonard J. Hall, RD.
- Lionel H. Lindsay, RD.
- Robert W. Shepherd.
- John A. Holland, RD.

=== King's Police Medals (KPM) ===
England & Wales

- William Picton Phillips, Chief Constable, Carmarthen County Constabulary.
- Frederick Henry Mardlin, Chief Constable, Northampton Borough Police.
- George Ennion, Superintendent, Chester County Constabulary.
- Joseph Hazell, Superintendent, Bristol City Police.
- John Ivin, Superintendent and Deputy Chief Constable, Bedford County Constabulary.
- Robert Jump, Superintendent, Lancaster County Constabulary.
- John Rochford, Inspector, River Wear Police.
- Royal Bird, Sergeant, Metropolitan Police.
- George Jennings, Sergeant, River Wear Police.
- Herbert Adams, Constable, River Wear Police.
- Samuel Bishop, Constable, Cornwall County Constabulary.
- Percy Carr, Constable, Metropolitan Police.
- Nicholas Cork, Constable, Lancaster County Constabulary.
- Gilbert Darke, Constable, Metropolitan Police.
- Arthur George Gunner, Constable, Surrey Constabulary.
- Walter Hearn, Constable, Metropolitan Police.
- William Jackson, Constable, River Wear Police.
- William Mewton, Constable, Metropolitan Police.
- William Monnery, Constable, Metropolitan Police.
- Francis Moore, Constable, Metropolitan Police.
- Frederick Ost, Constable, Metropolitan Police.
- George Richardson, Constable, Metropolitan Police.
- Frederick Riches, Constable, Metropolitan Police.
- William Steel, Constable, River Wear Police.
- Maurice Sullivan, Constable, Metropolitan Police.
- Albert Webber, Constable, Metropolitan Police.
- Harry Williams, Constable, Metropolitan Police.
- William Williams, Constable, Metropolitan Police.
- Frederick Wright, Constable, Metropolitan Police.

Fire Brigades

- Harry Hammond, Chief Officer, Margate Fire Brigade.

Scotland

Police and Fire Brigades

- James Barnett, Lieutenant, City of Glasgow Police.
- Robert Alexander, Superintendent, Ross and Cromarty Constabulary.
- Daniel Ritchie, Superintendent, Southern Division of the Glasgow Fire Brigade.
- Donald Cameron, Sergeant, Lanark County Constabulary.
- William Buist, Constable, City of Glasgow Police.

Ireland

- Herbert William Crane, Chief Inspector, Royal Irish Constabulary.
- Henry Edmund William Yates, County Inspector, Royal Irish Constabulary.
- Thomas Neylon, District Inspector, Royal Irish Constabulary.
- John Bruton, Sergeant, Dublin Metropolitan Police.
- Edward Hally, Sergeant, Dublin Metropolitan Police.
- Matthew Horgan, Sergeant, Royal Irish Constabulary.
- James Hayes, Constable, Royal Irish Constabulary.
- John Lynch, Constable, Dublin Metropolitan Police.
- Joseph Reynolds, Constable, Dublin Metropolitan Police.
- James Spillane, Constable, Royal Irish Constabulary.

India

- Norman Elliot Quinton Mainwaring, Deputy Inspector-General, Madras Police.
- Alwarappa Pillai Sadagopa Pillai, Sub-Inspector, Madras Police.
- Oliver Ethelbert Windle, Superintendent, Madras Police.
- Pasupuleti Parankusam Nayudu, Diwan Bahadur, Deputy Commissioner, Madras City Police.
- Harold Ernest Williams, Superintendent, Madras Police.
- Syed Abdur Rahim Sahib, Inspector, Madras Police.
- Arthur Charles John Bailey, District Superintendent, Bombay Police.
- Mahomed Hussain Shah, son of Syed Sujayat Ali Shah, Inspector of Police in Sind, Bombay Police.
- Llewellyn Charles Francis O'Brien, Inspector, Bombay City Police.
- Charles Robert Jeffreys, Inspector, Bombay City Police.
- Jiwa Pirbhai, 2nd grade Head Constable, Agency Police, Kathiawar, Bombay Police.
- Rupert Learoyd McCulloch, Superintendent of Police in Sind, Bombay Police.
- Frank Roddis, Superintendent, Bengal Police.
- John Skinner Wilson, Deputy Commissioner of Police, Headquarters, Calcutta, Bengal Police.
- Seymour Hebert Hatten Mills, Assistant Superintendent, Bengal Police.
- Jamini Mohan Kar, Inspector, Bengal Police.
- Tribeni Tewari, Constable, Bengal Police.
- Abhinandan Ojha, Constable, Bengal Police.
- Sheikh Daryao, Constable, Jhansi District, United Provinces Police.
- Moti Lal, Head Constable, Jhansi District, United Provinces Police.
- Hansraj, Constable, Moradabad District, United Provinces Police.
- Munshi Man Singh, Rai Bahadur, Superintendent of Police, United Provinces Police.
- Paras Ram, Sub-Inspector, Agra District, United Provinces Police.
- Mubashir Husain, Sub-Inspector, Agra District, United Provinces Police.
- William Alexander Marshall, Inspector, Punjab Police.
- Aziz-ud-Din Ahmad, Inspector, Punjab Police.
- Reginald Charles Albert Plomer, Deputy Superintendent, Punjab Police.
- Rai Sahib Dwarka Nath, Deputy Superintendent, Punjab PoIice.
- Maratab Ali, officiating Sub-inspector, Punjab Police.
- Nasir Shah, Sub-Inspector of Police, Punjab Police.
- Agha Gama Khan, Inspector, Punjab Police.
- Bawa Kharak Singh, Sub-Inspector, 3rd grade, Punjab Police.
- Tola Ram, Foot Constable, No. 473, Lahore District, Punjab Police.
- Tanwir Ahmad, Sub-Inspector, Punjab Police.
- Sub-Inspector Gopal Dass, Head Clerk, Lahore District, Punjab Police.
- Lieutenant-Colonel John Lawrence William ffrench-Mullen, CIE, Indian Army; Deputy Inspector-General, Burma Military Police.
- Henry Donald Grantham, District Superintendent, Burma Police.
- George Francis Danvers Colquhoun, Inspector of Police, 2nd grade, and Honorary Deputy Superintendent, Rangoon Town Police, Burma Police.
- Alexander William Cox, officiating District Superintendent, Burma Police.
- Kulman Bhaju, Subadar-Major, Burma Military Police.
- Richard Murphy, Sergeant, Rangoon Town Police, Burma Police.
- Annada Charan Mitra, Inspector of Police, Bihar and Orissa Police.
- Babu Lal Singh, Sub-Inspector of Police, Bihar and Orissa Police.
- Rama Nand Pandey, Constable, Bihar and Orissa Police.
- George Adrian Carroll, Assistant Superintendent, Central Provinces Police.
- The Honourable Lieutenant-Colonel Douglas Herbert, Indian Army; Inspector-General, Assam Police.
- William James Hickman Ballantine, Superintendent, Assam Police.
- Faiz Talab Khan, Sub-Inspector, North-West Frontier Province Police.
- Akhtar Ali Shah, Sub-Inspector, North-West Frontier Province Police.
- Zabta Kham, Foot Constable, 4th Grade, No. 1099, of Peshawar District, North-West Frontier Province Police.
- Gul Ahmed, Foot Constable. 4th Grade, No. 900, of the Peshawar District, North-West Frontier Province Police.
- Syed Hassan, Deputy Superintendent of Police, Baluchistan Police.

British Dominions Beyond The Seas

- Narcisse Leon Grandchamp, late Superintendent of Police, Montreal.
- Walter Griffiths, Fireman, Melbourne Metropolitan Fire Brigade.
- John McKenna, Chief Inspector of Police, Western Australia.
- Claude Woodruff Duncan, Commissioner of Police, Malta, 1916–1919, when he was appointed Inspector-General of Police, Southern Provinces, Nigeria.
- Herbert Layard Dowbiggin, Inspector-General of Police, Ceylon.
- Hugh Houston Hutchings, Assistant Commissioner of Grand Turk.
- James Owens, Acting Commissioner of Police, Southern Provinces, Nigeria.
- Ayeni Imesi, Sergeant, Southern Provinces Police, Nigeria.
- Kadiri Adamu, Lance-Corporal, Southern Provinces Police, Nigeria.
- Digby Rowland Albemarle Bettington, Inspector-General of Police, Gold Coast Colony.
- Che Lah bin Mat, Constable, Federated Malay States Police Force.
