= List of knights bachelor appointed in 1920 =

Knight Bachelor is the oldest and lowest-ranking form of knighthood in the British honours system; it is the rank granted to a man who has been knighted by the monarch but not inducted as a member of one of the organised orders of chivalry. Women are not knighted; in practice, the equivalent award for a woman is appointment as Dame Commander of the Order of the British Empire (founded in 1917).

== Knights bachelor appointed in 1920 ==
Date	Name	Notes	Ref.
27 February 1920	James Kemnal, FRS	Announced on 1 January 1920	
4 March 1920	Horace Charles Mules, CSI, MVO	Announced on 6 June 1919	
4 March 1920	Alfred Waldron Smithers, MP	Announced on 12 August 1919	
4 March 1920	Andrew Beattie	Deputy Lieutenant for the City of Dublin	
4 March 1920	Alfred Frederick Bird, MP		
4 March 1920	Arthur Cecil Tyrrell Beck, MP, JP		
4 March 1920	Ernest A. Wallis Budge, MA, LittD, FSA		
4 March 1920	William Carter	Mayor of Windsor during the War	
4 March 1920	Harry Cartmell	Mayor of Preston, 1913–19	
4 March 1920	Samuel Chapman		
4 March 1920	Josiah Court, MRCS, LRCP, JP		
4 March 1920	Francis Chatillon Danson		
4 March 1920	Edwin Wood Thorpe Farley	Mayor of Dover, 1913–19	
4 March 1920	John Fitzgerald	Lord Mayor of Newcastle-on-Tyne, 1914–15	
4 March 1920	Norris Tildesley Foster		
4 March 1920	George Jefford Fowler		
4 March 1920	Dr Henry John Gauvain		
4 March 1920	William Valters Summers Gradwell-Goodwin, JP	Mayor of Newcastle-under-Lyme since 1913	
4 March 1920	Francis Nugent Greer, CB, KC	Irish Parliamentary Draughtsman	
4 March 1920	Malcolm Nicholson Hogg		
4 March 1920	Thomas Jaffrey, JP		
4 March 1920	Robert Newbald Kay	Sheriff of York, 1914–15	
4 March 1920	Halford John Mackinder, MP		
4 March 1920	James Macklin		
4 March 1920	Maj. David Hughes Morgan		
4 March 1920	George William Needham		
4 March 1920	Thomas Neill, JP		
4 March 1920	Francis Grant Ogilvie, CB		
4 March 1920	Herbert John Ormond, JP	Mayor of Stoke Newington, 1914–19	
4 March 1920	Col. James Philip Reynolds, DSO, DL, JP		
4 March 1920	Hugh Malcolm Robinson, CB, ISO	Chief Inspector of Factories	
4 March 1920	Thomas Robinson, OBE, JP, MP		
4 March 1920	Leonard Bromfield Rowland, JP	Mayor of Wrexham, 1915–19	
4 March 1920	Professor Arthur Schuster, FRS		
4 March 1920	Charles Stone	"Nine times Mayor of Greenwich"	
4 March 1920	Alfred George Temple, FSA		
4 March 1920	William Towle		
4 March 1920	Lieutenant-Colonel William Abraham Wayland, JP	Mayor of Deptford, 1914–19	
4 March 1920	Maj. Nevile Rodwell Wilkinson, CVO	Ulster King of Arms	
4 March 1920	Ralph Molyneux Combe	Chief Justice of Nigeria	
4 March 1920	Hon. Thomas Lynedoch Graham	Judge President of the Eastern Districts Local Division, Capte of Good Hope Provincial Division of the Supreme Court of the Union of South Africa	
4 March 1920	Reginald Gray, KC	Lately Attorney-General of the Bermundas or Somers Islands	
4 March 1920	David Ernest Hutchins		
4 March 1920	Frederick Spencer Lister, MRCS		
4 March 1920	Hon. Cornelius Hermanus Wessels	Administrator of the Orange Free State Provincie in the Union of South Africa	
6 May 1920	Henry Chartres Biron	Chief Magistrate of the Police Courts of the Metropolis	
10 June 1920	Hon. Walter Synnot Manifold	President of the Legislative Council, State of Victoria. Announced on 1 January 1920.	
25 June 1920	Col. William Alfred Churchman	Announced 1 January 1920	
25 June 1920	Philip Herbert Hanson, CB	Announced 1 January 1920	
25 June 1920	James Richard Thursfield, MA	Announced 1 January 1920	
25 June 1920	Sidney Robert Alexander, MD	Mayor of Faversham, 1908–19	
25 June 1920	Hugh Percy Allen, MA, MusDoc	Director of the Royal College of Music	
25 June 1920	Professor Frederick William Andrewes, MD, FRS	Pathologist at St Bartholomew's Hospital	
25 June 1920	Capt. David Wilson Barker	Captain Superintendent of the Training Ship Worcester	
25 June 1920	Sydney Beauchamp	"Resident Medical Officer to the British Delegation during nearly the whole of the Peace Conference in Paris"	
25 June 1920	William Barrott Montfort Bird		
25 June 1920	John Brown, JP		
25 June 1920	Francis Morgan Bryant, CBE, MVO, ISO		
25 June 1920	Arthur Benjamin Bryceson	"Town Clerk of Woolwich for over 18 years"	
25 June 1920	Maj. Gerald Arthur Fowler Burton		
25 June 1920	Robert Burton Chadwick, MP		
25 June 1920	Ernest Clark, CBE	Secretary of the Royal Commission on the Income Tax	
25 June 1920	Hon. James Daniel Connolly	Agent-General for the State of Western Australia	
25 June 1920	His Honour Judge John Walker Craig, KC		
25 June 1920	Walter Erskine Crum, OBE		
25 June 1920	Philip Dawson	Member of the Disposal Board, Ministry of Munitions	
25 June 1920	Joseph Dobbie		
25 June 1920	Robert Henry Glanfield	President of the Wholesale Clothing Manufacturers' Federation	
25 June 1920	Wemyss Grant-Wilson, MA, LLM, JP		
25 June 1920	Henry Gregg	Mayor of Tynemouth, 1913–18	
25 June 1920	Alderman Charles O'Brien Harding, JP, LRCP	Mayor of Eastbourne in 1903 and from 1916 to 1919	
25 June 1920	Edgar Josiah Harper, FSI	Chief Valuer, Inland Revenue Department	
25 June 1920	Professor James Blacklock Henderson, DSc		
25 June 1920	Lt-Col. Maxwell Hicks, CBE		
25 June 1920	Alderman James Peace Hinchliffe, JP	Chairman of West Riding of Yorkshire County Council	
25 June 1920	Harry Hope, MP		
25 June 1920	Louis Stanley Johnson, MP		
25 June 1920	Henry S. Keith, JP	Provost of Hamilton	
25 June 1920	Walter Guy Coffin Kirkwood	Lately Secretary of the Post Office, Edinburgh	
25 June 1920	Thomas Joseph Lennard	Vice-President of the Royal Colonial Institute	
25 June 1920	Maj. Charles McIver		
25 June 1920	Maj. George Espec John Manners, DL, JP		
25 June 1920	Samuel Meeson Morris	Mayor of Shrewsbury, 1901–02, and 1916–18	
25 June 1920	William Noble	Chief Engineer, General Post Office	
25 June 1920	William Payne Perry, CB	Director of Finance, War Office	
25 June 1920	Ernest Romey	Solicitor	
25 June 1920	George Royle	Mayor of Bedford, 1903	
25 June 1920	James Simpson, LLB		
25 June 1920	Albert Frederick Stephenson, JP		
25 June 1920	William Henry Veno		
25 June 1920	Henry William Verey		
25 June 1920	William Howell Walters		
25 June 1920	Zachariah Wheatley	Mayor of Abergavenny	
25 June 1920	Henry Alexander Wickham		
25 June 1920	Jeremiah Wilson, CMG	Lately Postmaster-General of the Union of South Africa	
25 June 1920	James Lawton Wingate	President of the Royal Scottish Academy	
25 June 1920	John Carruthers Beattie, DSc	Principal of the University of Cape Town in the Union of South Africa	
25 June 1920	Colin Rees Davies	Chief Justice of the Bermudas or Somers Islands	
25 June 1920	Lt-Col. Herman Melville Heyman	Rhodesian Reserve Volunteers, Bulawayo; Member of the Legislative Council of Souther Rhodesia	
25 June 1920	Hon. Joseph Henry Hood	Judge of the Supreme Court of the State of Victoria	
25 June 1920	Capt. (brevet Maj.) Edward Humphrey Manisty Leggett, DSO	Chairman, East Africa Section, London Chamber of Commerce	
25 June 1920	John Roberts, CMG		
19 July 1920	Hon. Walter Henry Lee	Premier of the State of Tasmania. Announced 1 January 1920.	
23 July 1920	Charles Henry Kesteven	Solicitor to the Government of India. Announced 1 January 1920.	
23 July 1920	Henry Hubert Hayden, CSI, CIE, DSc	Director, Geological Survey of India. Announced 5 June 1920.	
12 August 1920	William Arthur Beardsell	Sheriff of Madras. Announced 1 January 1919.	
12 August 1920	Mr Justice Rigby Philip Watson Smith		
12 August 1920	Mr Justice Edward Acton		
14 October 1920	Maj. George Alexander Dolby	Mayor of Poole, 1917–20	
14 October 1920	Curtis George Ashdown		
14 October 1920	Charles Eves		

== Knighthoods announced in 1920 but where the date of investiture is unknown or after 1921 ==
It was announced on 1 January 1920 that Gerald Aubrey Goodman was to be knighted, but he was unable to attend the investiture ceremonies held before late March. He was styled as a knight in The Edinburgh Gazette in December 1920, when he was appointed Chief Justice of the Straits Settlement.

The Rt Hon. Richard Watkins Richards, the Lord Mayor of Sydney, was also included in the 1920 New Year Honours published on 1 January 1920, but no record of his investiture has been found in The London Gazette.

The following were announced in the New Year Honours for India on 1 January 1920; they were to be dubbed by the Viceroy of India at a later date, an event which was not recorded in The London Gazette; some were later dubbed by the king in 1921.

Date conferred	Name	Notes
	Mr Justice Nalini Ranjan Chatterji	Judge, High Court, Calcutta
25 June 1921	Mr Justice Basanta Kumar Mullick	Indian Civil Service; Judge, Patna High Court, Bihar and Orissa. Dubbed by the King on 25 June 1921.
	Malcolm Nicholson Hogg	Partner in Forbes, Forbes, Campbell & Co., Bombay
25 June 1921	Thomas Joseph Strangman	Advocate-General, Bombay. Dubbed by the King on 25 June 1921.
	Robert Stanes	Merchant, Madras
25 June 1921	Percy Wilson Newson	Senior Partner, Jardine, Skinner & Co., Calcutta. Dubbed by the King on 25 June 1921.
	Robert Taylor	Senior Partner, John Taylor and Sons, London, and Director of the Mysore Gold Mining Company Ltd, London

The following were announced in the New Year Honours for India on 5 January 1920; they were to be dubbed by the Viceroy of India at a later date, an event which was also not recorded in The London Gazette:

Name	Notes
Col. Hormasjee Eduljee Banatvala, CSI (Indian Medical Service)	Lately Inspector-General, Civil Hospitals, Assam
Diwan Bahadur Pitti Thyagaraya Chetti Garu	President of the Corporation, Madras
Abdul Karim Abdul Shakur Jamal	Merchant of Burma
Lallubhai Asharam Shah	A Puisne Judge of the High Court of Judicature, Bombay
Thomas Robert John Ward, CIE, MVO	Inspector-General of Irrigation, Punjab
