= George Fowler =

George Fowler may refer to:

- George Fowler (politician) (1839–1896), South Australian businessman and politician
- George Fowler (magistrate) (1858–1937), English solicitor and magistrate
- George William Fowler (1859–1924), Canadian MP and Senator from New Brunswick
- George D. Fowler (1860–1909), Pennsylvania Railroad official
- George Herbert Fowler (1861–1940), English zoologist, historian and archivist
- George Fowler (footballer) (born 1998), English footballer
- George Fowler (cricketer) (1860–1934), New Zealand cricketer
- George Ryerson Fowler, surgeon from Brooklyn, New York
