= Philip Hanson =

Philip Hanson may refer to:

- Phil Hanson (politician) (born 1932), American politician from Arizona
- Phil Hanson (racing driver) (born 1999), British racing driver
- Philip Hanson (civil servant) (1871–1955), British civil servant

== See also ==
- Phil Hansen (disambiguation)
