= Walter Gates =

Walter Gates may refer to:

- Walter F. Gates (died 1828), Canadian merchant and politician
- Walter Gates (civil servant) (c. 1860–1936), British civil servant
- Walter Gates (fencer) (1871–1939), South African Olympic fencer

== See also ==
- Gates (surname)
