= Nethersole =

Nethersole is a surname. Notable people with the surname include:

- Sir Francis Nethersole, (1587–1659) Secretary to the Electress Elizabeth, prisoner in the Tower of London, Member of Parliament for Corfe Castle, Dorset, and political pamphleteer of the English Civil War.
- Lieutenant-Colonel F. R. Nethersole CIE, (1865–1933) Indian Army officer and administrator in Burma
- Noel Newton "Crab" Nethersole, (1903–1959) Jamaican Rhodes Scholar, cricket player and administrator, lawyer, politician, economist, and Jamaica's Minister for Finance
- Olga Nethersole CBE RRC, (1866–1951) English actress, theatre producer, and wartime nurse/health educator.
- Robert Nethersole, (c. 1482–1556) Member of the English Parliament for Dover.

== See also ==
- Alice Ho Miu Ling Nethersole Hospital, an acute district general hospital in Hong Kong, commonly referred to as just "Nethersole" in Cantonese
- Pamela Youde Nethersole Eastern Hospital, another acute district general hospital in Hong Kong
