= Hugh Thornton =

Hugh Thornton may refer to:

- Sir Hugh Thornton (civil servant) (1881–1962), British civil servant
- Hugh Thornton (American football) (born 1991), American football player
