= Gauvain (name) =

Gauvain is both a French masculine given name and a surname. Notable people with the name include:

== Surname ==
- Florence Gauvain (born 1962), French tennis player
- Henry Gauvain (1878–1945), British surgeon and tuberculosis specialist
- Hervé Gauvain (1955–2025), French tennis player
- Raphaël Gauvain (born 1973), French lawyer and politician
- Sybille Gauvain (born 1994), French tennis player

== Given name ==
- Gauvain Sers (born 1989), French singer-songwriter

== See also ==
- Juliette Drouet, born Julienne Josephine Gauvain (1806–1883), French actress
- Gawain, a character in Arthurian legend
