= Brigstocke =

Brigstocke may refer to:

- Charles Brigstocke (1876–1951), British civil servant
- Dominic Brigstocke, British television director
- George Brigstocke (d. 1971), British former Anglican priest and Roman Catholic convert
- Heather Brigstocke, Baroness Brigstocke (1929–2004), British schoolteacher, academic and peer
- John Brigstocke (1945–2020), British admiral
- Marcus Brigstocke (born 1973), English comedian
- Thomas Brigstocke (1809–1881), Welsh portrait painter

== See also ==
- Brigstock, a village in Northamptonshire in England
