= Gradwell =

Gradwell is a surname. Notable people with the surname include:

- Charmian Gradwell (born 1960), British actress, works in the television game show The Adventure Game
- Leo Gradwell, a veteran of the disaster of Convoy PQ 17 and a British barrister and magistrate
- Robert Gradwell (1777–1833), English Catholic bishop
- William Gradwell-Goodwin (died 1942), the Mayor of Newcastle-under-Lyme, Staffordshire, England, from 1913 to the 1920s
