= Wood Awards =

Annual British award for woodworking

- Description: Premier British award for excellence in wood architecture and furniture
- Country: United Kingdom
- Presented by: Worshipful Company of Carpenters
- Formerly called: Carpenters' Award (until 2003)
- Website: http://www.woodawards.com/

The Wood Awards (until 2003 the Carpenters' Award) is a British award for working with wood. The award, which was launched in 1971, is bestowed on winners of several categories within buildings and furniture. Awards are presented in The Carpenters Hall following the decision of the architects, engineers, furniture designers / makers, timber specialists and architectural journalists who judge the competition. The Awards are sponsored by several commercial organisations and the Worshipful Company of Carpenters.

Each year there is one winner and one "Highly Commended" project in seven categories, and a "Gold Award" for the best of the seven category winners.

== Winners ==
A list of winners and highly commended projects, 2008-2025 is available online.

=== Gold Award winners, 2008-2025 ===
- 2008:New Shetland Museum & Archives, new building
- 2009:Kings Place Concert Hall, concert hall within larger new development
- 2010:Stoke Newington Town Hall, restoration of 1930s building
- 2011:Brockholes Visitor Centre, creation of new floating building on nature reserve
- 2012: The Hurlingham Club Outdoor Pool
- 2013: Bishop Edward King Chapel
- 2014: Ditchling Museum of Art + Craft
- 2015: The Fishing Hut
- 2016: Maggie’s at the Robert Parfett Building
- 2017: Coastal House, Devon
- 2018: Storey’s Field Centre & Eddington Nursery
- 2019: Cork House
- 2020: The Rye Apartments
- 2021: Magdalene College Library
- 2022: Homerton College Dining Hall
- 2023: New Temple Complex
- 2024: Brighton Dome Corn Exchange & Studio Theatre
- 2025: Urban Nature Project, Natural History Museum
