= Westcott Stile Abell =

British naval architect

Abell in 1940.

Sir Westcott Stile Abell, KBE (16 January 1877 – 29 July 1961) was a British naval architect.

Abell was born in Littleham, Exmouth, Devon, 16 January 1877, the first son of Thomas Abell and Mary Ann Stile. At the age of twenty he lost his right hand and suffered serious throat injuries while lighting fireworks to celebrate the diamond jubilee. Despite this handicap, he taught himself to write with his left hand and recovered to such good purpose that he passed out head of his year (1900) at Royal Naval College, Greenwich with a level of marks unsurpassed for many years. He became professor of naval architecture at the University of Liverpool (1910–1914) and chief ship surveyor at Lloyds Register of Shipping, serving as president of the Institute of Marine Engineers (1924–25) and master of the Worshipful Company of Shipwrights (1931–32). In 1928 he resigned his appointment with Lloyds Register to take up the chair of naval architecture at the Armstrong College of Durham University at Newcastle upon Tyne (one of the precursor institutions to Newcastle University).

He was awarded KBE in the 1920 civilian war honours.

== Publications ==
- Naval Architecture: The Art and Its Application. An Inaugural Lecture by Westcott Stile Abell on election to the Alexander Elder Chair of Naval Architecture in the University of Liverpool 1910 (University of Liverpool Press, 1910).
- The Ship and Her Work (London School of Economics and Political Science Studies in Commerce, vol. 2; 1923)
- The Safe Sea (1932)
- The Shipwright's Trade (1948)
