= Edgar Abraham =

British civil servant & judge (1880-1955)

- Born: Edgar Gaston Furtado Abraham; 8 April 1880; Kingston, Jamaica
- Died: 17 February 1955 (aged 74); Bridgport, UK
- Military career
- Allegiance: United Kingdom
- Branch: Royal Garrison Artillery
- Service years: 1904–1920
- Rank: Captain
- Conflicts: World War I; Western Front
- Awards: Order of the Bath

Captain Edgar Gaston Furtado Abraham CB (8 April 1880 – 17 February 1955) was a British civil servant and judge in India.

Abraham was born in Kingston, Jamaica to Jewish parents John Furtado Abraham, a merchant, and Jeanne Lucie Dreyfus, anglicised to Jane Lucy. His father was from a Sephardic family of Portuguese Jews while his mother was from Paris. He was educated at St Paul's School, London and Corpus Christi College, Oxford. He joined the Indian Civil Service in 1904, serving in the Punjab throughout his career.

On the outbreak of the First World War in 1914, he returned to Britain to be commissioned into the Royal Garrison Artillery, serving on the Western Front and reaching the rank of Captain. In January 1918, he was seconded to the War Cabinet as an Assistant Secretary and four months later was sent to the Versailles Conference, where he served until 1920. For these services he was appointed Companion of the Order of the Bath (CB) in the 1920 New Year Honours.

Returning to India, he served successively as Deputy Commissioner of the Punjab, Home Secretary of the Punjab, and as a Sessions Judge.

A member of the New Commonwealth Society, he was one of those who presented plans for a multinational "world security force" in London in 1949.

He died at his home near Bridgport in 1955.

== Notes ==
- Abraham's entry in Who's Who
