= John Fitzgerald (brewer) =

Irish-born brewer and wine and spirit merchant

Sir John Fitzgerald DL JP (1857 – 2 November 1930) was an Irish-born brewer and wine and spirit merchant, who served as Lord Mayor of Newcastle upon Tyne from 1914 to 1915. Born in County Tipperary, he was knighted in the 1920 New Year Honours for his services to Newcastle. He founded the Sir John Fitzgerald pub chain that bears his name and was still owned and operated by his descendants until it was purchased by Ladhar Leisure in December 2020.

He was a prominent Roman Catholic and generous benefactor to church charities. He donated Fitzgerald Hall to the church for use as a children's centre in memory of his son, Lieutenant Gerald Fitzgerald, who was killed in the First World War.

He left a fortune of in excess of £270,000 (equivalent to £21,561,000 in 2023), including £1,000 bequeathed to the Bishop of Hexham and Newcastle for distribution to Catholic charities.
