= Francis Danson =

Sir Francis Danson JP FSA FSS
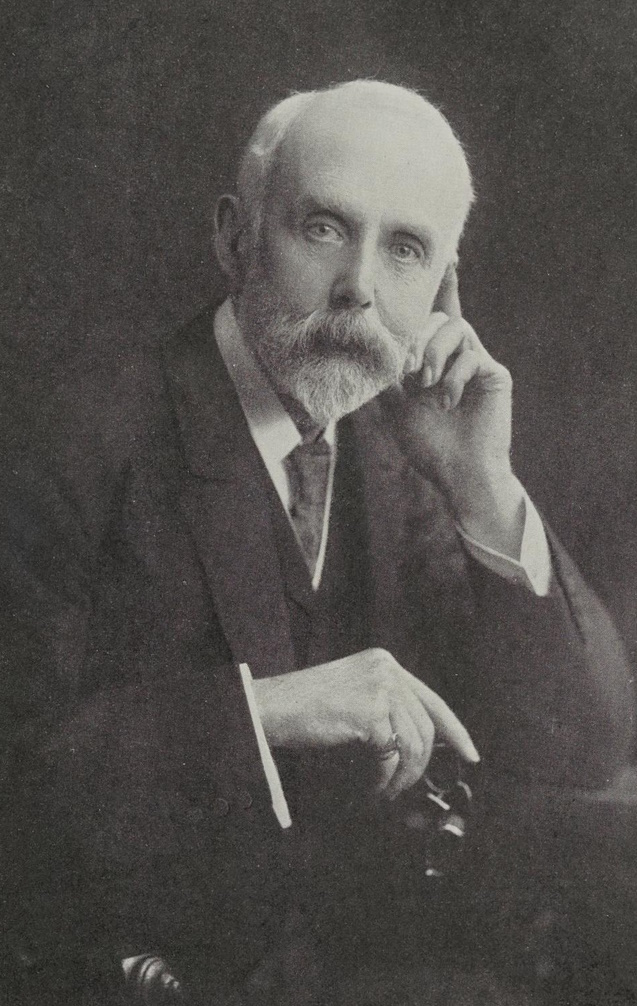
- Born: Francis Chatillon Danson; 24 November 1855; Barnston, Cheshire
- Died: 3 July 1926 (aged 70); Oxton, Birkenhead
- Occupation(s): Average adjuster, investor

Sir Francis Chatillon Danson JP FSA FSS (24 November 1855 – 3 July 1926) was a British average adjuster (assessing claims for marine insurance), mortgage broker and investor, closely associated with shipping at the port of Liverpool. He was the senior partner of a company whose customers included many of the shipping lines based at Liverpool. Danson was a joint mortgagee with the White Star Line for the construction of its three Olympic-class liners in the years prior to World War I.

== Early years ==
Danson was born on 24 November 1855 at Barnston, Cheshire, the son of John Towne Danson (1817–1898) and Ann Eleanor (née Lockett). His father had worked as a journalist and was a barrister. Shortly after Francis' birth J. T. Danson became involved in the marine insurance business. He wrote a pamphlet in 1859 claiming that Liverpool lacked an adequate local marine underwriting market, despite its network of docks being of critical importance to Britain's economy. In June 1860 a joint stock marine insurance company, the Thames and Mersey Marine Insurance Co., was formed with J. T. Danson as its first secretary. In 1866 Danson became the company's underwriter.

Danson was educated at Liverpool College and in Paris, after which he was articled by his father to the Liverpool firm of average adjusters, Baily, Lowndes and Stockley. An average adjuster is a professional who specialises in marine insurance, responsible for preparing claims for insurance policies, often involving damage or loss to cargo or marine craft.

== F. C. Danson & Co. ==
In 1879 Danson established his own firm of average adjusters, F. C. Danson & Co., and was the senior partner of the company. The company was located at 22B Liverpool and London Chambers in High Street, Liverpool. The business prospered and Danson progressively acquired the work of most of the leading Liverpool shipping line companies, including the White Star Line, Lamport and Holt, Alfred Booth and Company, the Bibby Line, the Leyland Line, the Harrison Line and the British and African Steam Navigation Company.

Francis Danson and Helen ('Nellie') Woodhead were married on 16 September 1880 at Liverpool, Lancashire. The couple had one daughter, born in May 1885 at Bebington, Cheshire. Nellie Danson died six days after the birth of her daughter, aged 29.

Francis Danson and Edith Rudolf were married on 15 August 1888 at Rock Ferry, Birkenhead, in county Cheshire. The couple had two sons, born in 1892 and 1893. Danson and his family lived across the River Mersey from Liverpool, at 'Rosewarne', 74 Bidston Road in Oxton, a suburb of Birkenhead.

In 1902, after the White Star Line was purchased by the International Mercantile Marine Company (IMM), Danson was informed that the assessments of marine loss claims for White Star would have to be prepared in London. In order to retain White Star's business he opened an office of F. C. Danson & Co. in London. In 1904, after Bruce Ismay was appointed president of the IMM, Danson's company was granted the British adjustment business for the company as a whole, with the business on the United States side being handled by Johnson and Higgins, insurance brokers of 49-51 Wall Street in New York.

The White Star Line was in direct competition with the Cunard Line for their respective shares of the Atlantic passenger trade, especially in regard to attracting wealthy first-class passengers. In about 1907 White Star decided to build several Olympic-class liners, combining great size, safety and comfort with economy of operation, to compete with Cunard's Lusitania and Mauretania, both launched in 1906 and at that stage the world's largest ships. In early 1908 the White Star Line issued £2.5 million worth of additional shares to begin the process of raising funds to build the Olympic-class ocean liners. From late 1908, in order to raise additional revenue, White Star entered into a series of mortgage agreements using its existing vessels as security for the loans. In each case the specified lenders or joint mortgagees were three individuals, one of whom was Danson. The other two were Algernon Henry Mills, a managing partner of White Star's bank, Glyn, Mills, Currie and Co. Ltd., and Alfred Lyttelton, a Liberal Unionist politician and a relative of Mills. By that stage Danson had a long-standing connection with the White Star Line, and by becoming a joint mortgagee he was "investing in a company which was one of his oldest and most valued customers".

Olympic, the first of White Star's Olympic-class liners, was completed in 1911 with Mills, Lyttleton and Danson as joint mortgagees. Titanic was the second-built of this class. The ship's registration certificate, dated March 1912, records no mortgage arrangement, but this was probably because Titanic sank before a deal could be finalised. Britannic was the third of White Star's Olympic-class liners, completed in 1915 with Mills and Danson as the two surviving joint mortgagees.

== Other interests ==
At various times Danson held the role of chairman of both the Liverpool and National Association of Average Adjusters. From 1898 to 1904 he was chairman of the Birkenhead Conservative Association. Danson was a long-standing member of the Mersey Docks and Harbour Board and the Liverpool Chamber of Commerce (of which he was president from 1896 to 1899). He was deputy treasurer of the University of Liverpool (and member of the university council from 1903 to 1918).

For many years Danson took an active interest in and fostered the activities of the Liverpool School of Tropical Medicine (LSTM) at the University of Liverpool. From 1901 ro 1902 he represented the Council of University College on the School's committee. From 1902 he was a member of the committee and from 1908 to 1914 was acting vice-chairman. In 1913, after the resignation of Lord Leverhulme, he "accepted the unanimous invitation" to take on the role of chairman of the LSTM.

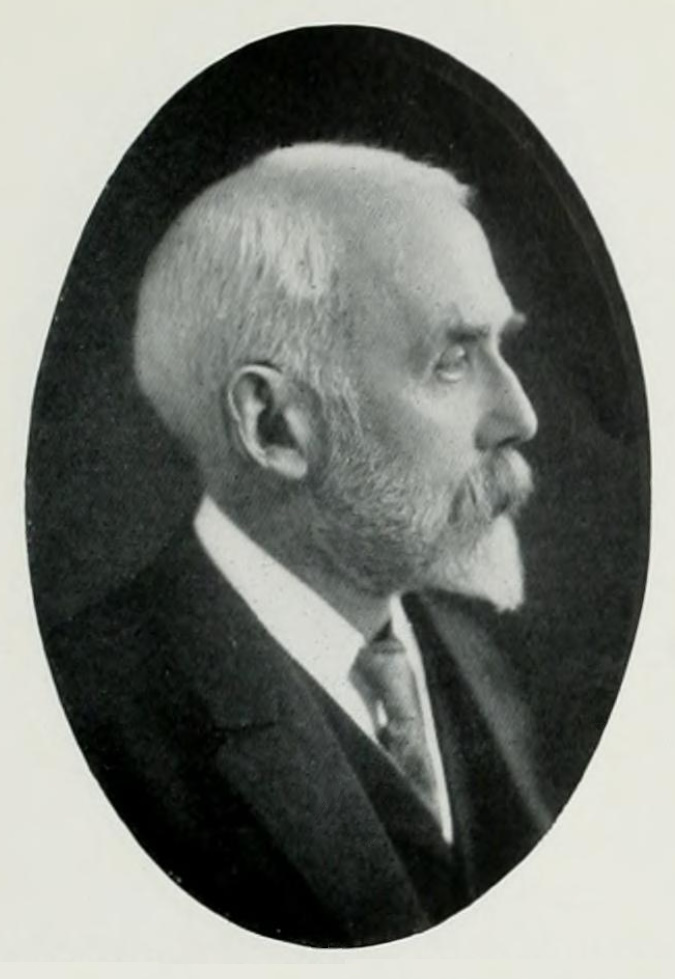
Portrait of Sir Francis C. Danson.

Danson was a governor of Sedbergh School from 1909 to 1914. He was a member of the Admiralty Transport Arbitration Board from 1914 until his death. Danson served as deputy chairman of the Liverpool Shipwreck and Humane Society and was also a member of the Tidal Institute and the International Law Association.

Francis and Edith Danson lived at 'Rosewarne' in Bidston Road, Oxton and 'Dry Close' at Grasmere in Westmorland. Danson was a collector of books and antiquities and was a member of the Institute of Archaeology. He was president of the Liverpool Philomathic Society in 1913 and 1914.

In 1914 and 1915 Danson held the ceremonial office of High Sheriff of the county of Westmorland.

During World War I Danson served as the representative of the Board of Trade on the London and Liverpool War Risks Insurance Association. Two of Danson's sons served in the conflict. Francis Rudolf Danson, a lieutenant in the 1/4th Battalion of the Cheshire Regiment, was killed in action on the Gallipoli peninsula on 10 August 1915. His younger brother John Raymond Danson was a captain in the Cheshire Regiment and survived the war.

During Danson's chairmanship the School of Tropical Medicine was transferred from its old laboratory at the University of Liverpool to new laboratory and teaching premises in Pembroke Place (a move delayed until after the end of World War I). In 1921 the Sir Alfred Lewis Jones Research Laboratory at Freetown in Sierra Leone was opened (commemorating the LSTM's late benefactor), with the director of the new facility holding the Chair of Tropical Diseases in Africa at the University of Liverpool.

Danson was knighted in the 1920 New Year Honours for his service as chairman of the Liverpool School of Tropical Medicine.

== Death ==
Danson died on 3 July 1926 at his home at Oxton, Birkenhead, aged 71.
