= Stoke Newington Town Hall =

Municipal building in London, England

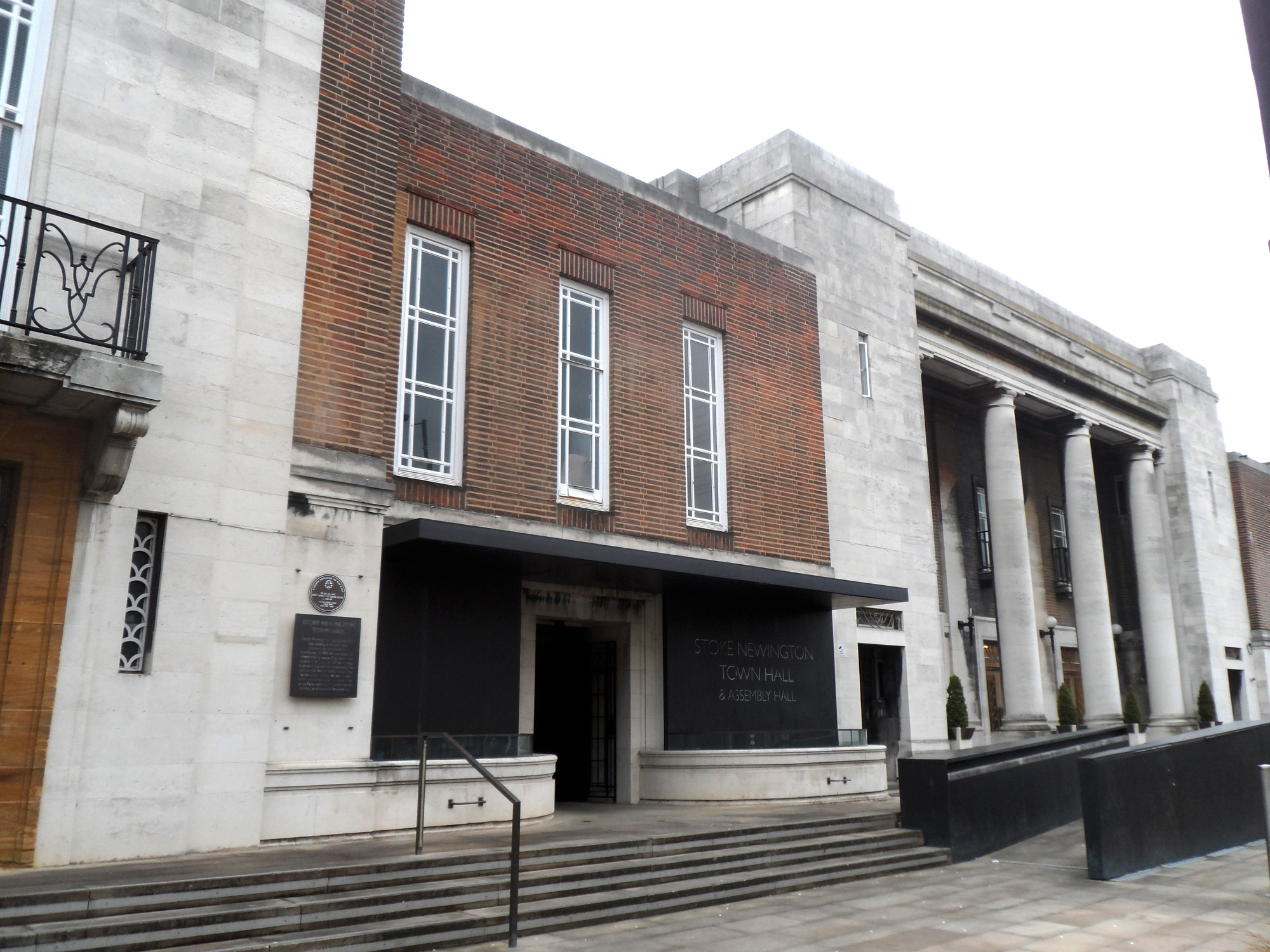
- The Assembly Hall section of Stoke Newington Town Hall

- Shown in Hackney
- 51.5615°N 0.0832°W
- Location: Church Street, Stoke Newington

History
- Built: 1937

Site notes
- Architect: John Reginald Truelove
- Architectural styles: Renaissance style (Municipal Offices) / Classical style (Town Hall and Assembly Hall)

Listed Building – Grade II
- Designated: 10 May 1995
- Reference no.: 1253465

Stoke Newington Town Hall is a municipal building in Church Street, Stoke Newington, London. It is a Grade II listed building.

== History ==
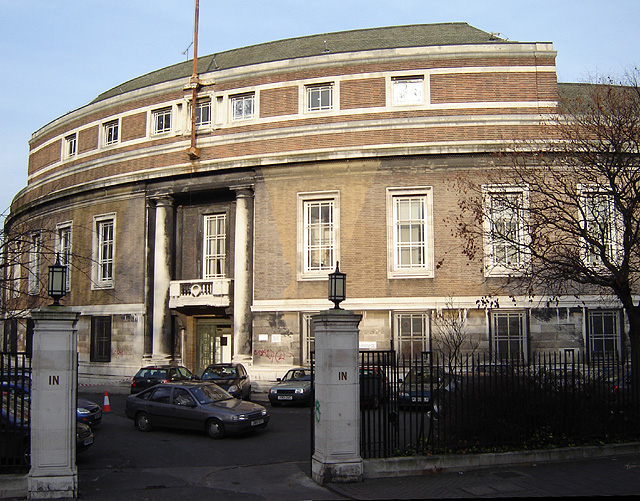
The Municipal Offices section of Stoke Newington Town Hall

The building was commissioned to replace the council offices in Milton Grove which had been designed by E. Fry in the Italianate style and completed in 1881. After the area became a metropolitan borough in 1900, civic leaders decided that this arrangement was inadequate for their needs and that they would procure a more substantial town hall: the site chosen had previously been occupied by a 15th-century Manor House and, later, by a row of Georgian houses.

The new building was designed by John Reginald Truelove and was completed in 1937. The design involved a symmetrical curved frontage of fifteen bays forming municipal offices built in the Renaissance style to the west; this section, which contained the council chamber, featured a central section which was recessed with a doorway on the ground floor and a balcony and window on the first floor flanked by two huge Doric order columns. This arrangement was complemented by a rectangular assembly hall with four huge Doric order columns flanked by pavilions built in the Classical style to the east. A sprung Canadian maple dance floor installed in the assembly hall allowing it to be used as a dance facility.

In the Second World War, the building served as the local civil defence headquarters and was heavily camouflaged to protect it from enemy bombing during the London Blitz.

The town hall continued to serve as the headquarters of the Metropolitan Borough of Stoke Newington for much of the 20th century but ceased to be the local seat of government after the formation of the London Borough of Hackney in 1965. The council chamber was subsequently used as a storeroom and the assembly hall was closed, due to its state of disrepair in 1999.

The building was extensively refurbished and restored to a design by Hawkins\Brown in 2010: the works, which cost £6.4 million, included comprehensive repairs to the wooden panelling in the council chamber and the modernisation of the assembly hall. The quality of the work was recognised by the Worshipful Company of Carpenters in that year's Wood Awards.

Works of art in the town hall include a portrait of the former mayor of Stoke Newington, Sir Herbert John Ormond, by Henry Scott Tuke.
