= John Duncan Gregory =

British diplomat

John Duncan Gregory CB CMG (26 May 1878 – 29 January 1951) was a British diplomat.

Gregory was the son of Sir Philip Gregory. He was educated at Eton College and joined the Diplomatic Service in 1902. He was promoted Second Secretary in 1902. From 1907 to 1909 he worked at the British Embassy in Vienna. He later became Chargé d'Affaires in Bucharest, was posted to the Holy See in 1915, and was promoted Counsellor in 1919. In 1920 he was posted to the Foreign Office in London as Senior Clerk and Assistant Secretary, and in 1925 he became Assistant Under-Secretary of State for Foreign Affairs.

He was the principal figure in the "Francs Case" of 1928, in which he and two other Foreign Office employees were accused of having used their position to speculate in foreign currencies. While he was cleared of doing anything illegal, he was held by an inquiry to have acted in a manner incompatible with his post and was dismissed from the Diplomatic Service.

Gregory was appointed Companion of the Order of St Michael and St George (CMG) in the 1920 New Year Honours and Companion of the Order of the Bath (CB) in the 1925 Birthday Honours.
