= Vernon Dawson =

British civil servant (1881–1958)

Sir Vernon Dawson KCIE (1881 – 8 November 1958) was a British civil servant.

Dawson was educated at St Paul's School and Corpus Christi College, Oxford. He joined the Indian Civil Service in 1904 and served in East Bengal, Assam and with the Government of India. From 1918 to 1921 he served at the India Office in London. In March 1921 he retired from the ICS on medical grounds and transferred to the British Civil Service, continuing to serve at the India Office until his retirement as Assistant Secretary in 1941.

He was appointed Companion of the Order of the Indian Empire (CIE) in the 1920 New Year Honours and Knight Commander of the Order of the Indian Empire (KCIE) in 1934.
