= James Charles (sea captain) =

British mariner

Sir James Charles
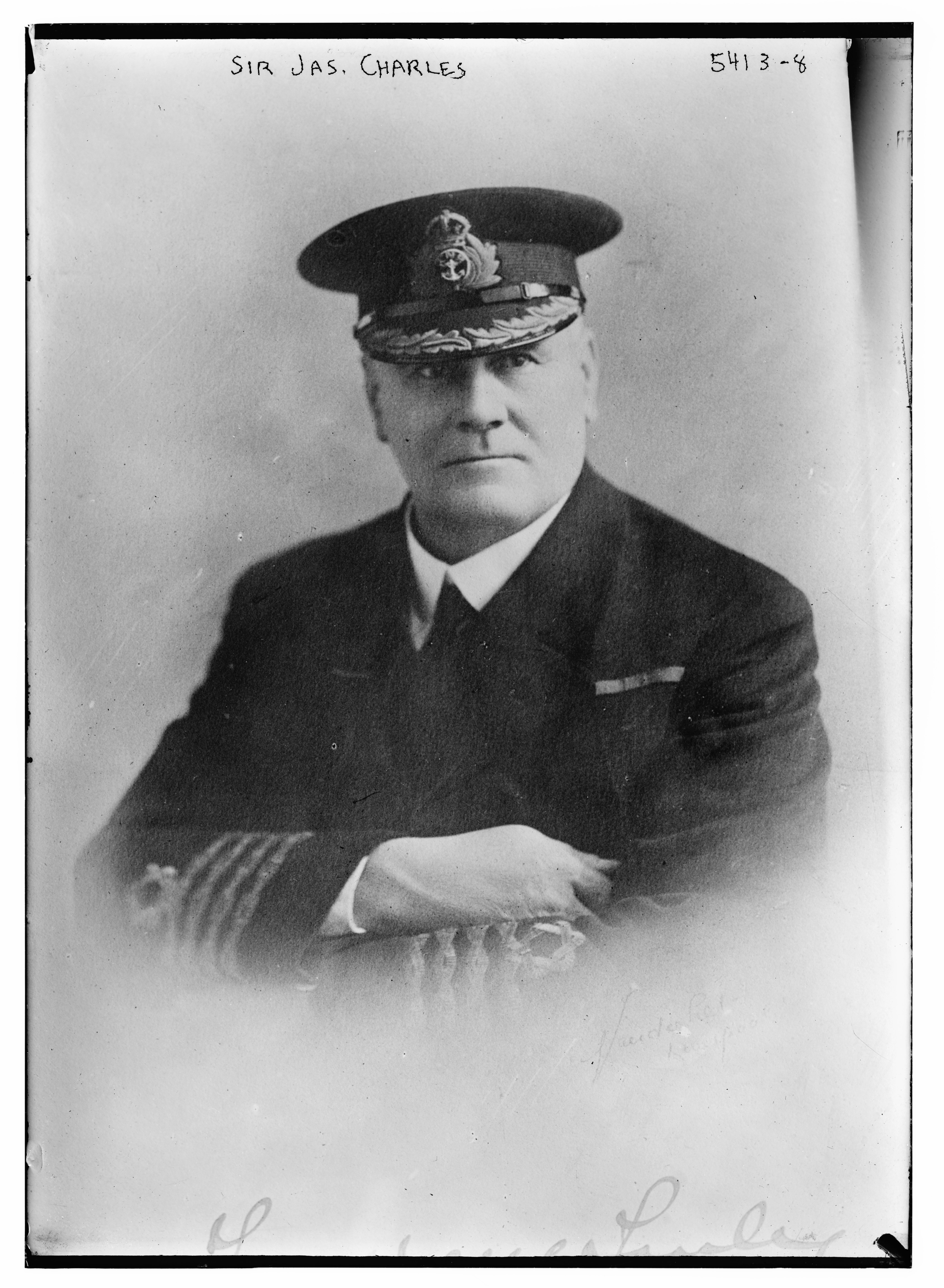
- Born: James Thomas Walter Charles; 2 August 1865; Hursley, Hampshire, England
- Died: 16 July 1928 (aged 62); Southampton, England
- Occupations: Ship's captain, Commodore of Cunard Line (1921)
- Years active: 1880-1928

Sir James Thomas Walter Charles KBE CB RD RNR (2 August 1865 – 16 July 1928) was a British ocean liner captain and later Commodore of the Cunard Steamship Company.

He first went to sea at the age of 15 in 1880, sailing on barques around Cape Horn South Africa. At Cunard he rose through the ranks and commanded the RMS Lusitania and RMS Mauretania, among others, before and during World War I. In March 1918 he was given command of the RMS Aquitania. He was selected as one of the six representative Mercantile Marine captains to be appointed Knight Commander of the Order of the British Empire (KBE) in the civilian 1920 New Year Honours List.

He was made Commodore of the Cunard Line in 1921. He was due to retire on 2 August 1928 when he suffered an internal haemorrhage while in command of the Aquitania on a return voyage to Southampton.

== Death ==
Charles' final voyage was on the Aquitania. In his career, he had made 726 transatlantic voyages. At New York, there was little turn around time and he spoke of having to spend much time on the bridge due to fog. At Cherbourg, his officers tried to persuade him to rest and allow his second-in-command, Staff Captain Dolphin, to dock the ship. After Cherbourg, the ship made its way to Southampton and Charles felt more inclined to allow the receiving pilot to take charge of the Aquitania. He reluctantly agreed to rest in the chartroom, where he became ill with a haemorrhage. When the Aquitania docked, his wife was summoned and he was taken to hospital where he was pronounced dead. The Commodore's flag was lowered to half-mast, announcing his passing to the passengers.
