= Alan Holme =

British administrator in India

Alan Thomas Holme CIE (1872 – 9 July 1931) was a British administrator in India.

Holme was born in Naples and was educated at the International School in Naples, Bedford School, Clifton College, and Trinity College, Cambridge. He joined the Indian Civil Service and was posted to Oudh, where he served as a magistrate, settlement officer, and acting private secretary to the Lieutenant-Governor. He then served as a settlement officer in Rajputana, political agent in the Southern States, British Resident at Udaipur, Chief Commissioner of Ajmer-Merwara, and Officiating Agent to the Governor-General in Rajputana. He was appointed Companion of the Order of the Indian Empire (CIE) in the 1920 New Year Honours. He retired in 1922.
