= Edwin Farley =

Mayor of Dover, Kent, England (1864-1939)

Sir Edwin Farley MBE
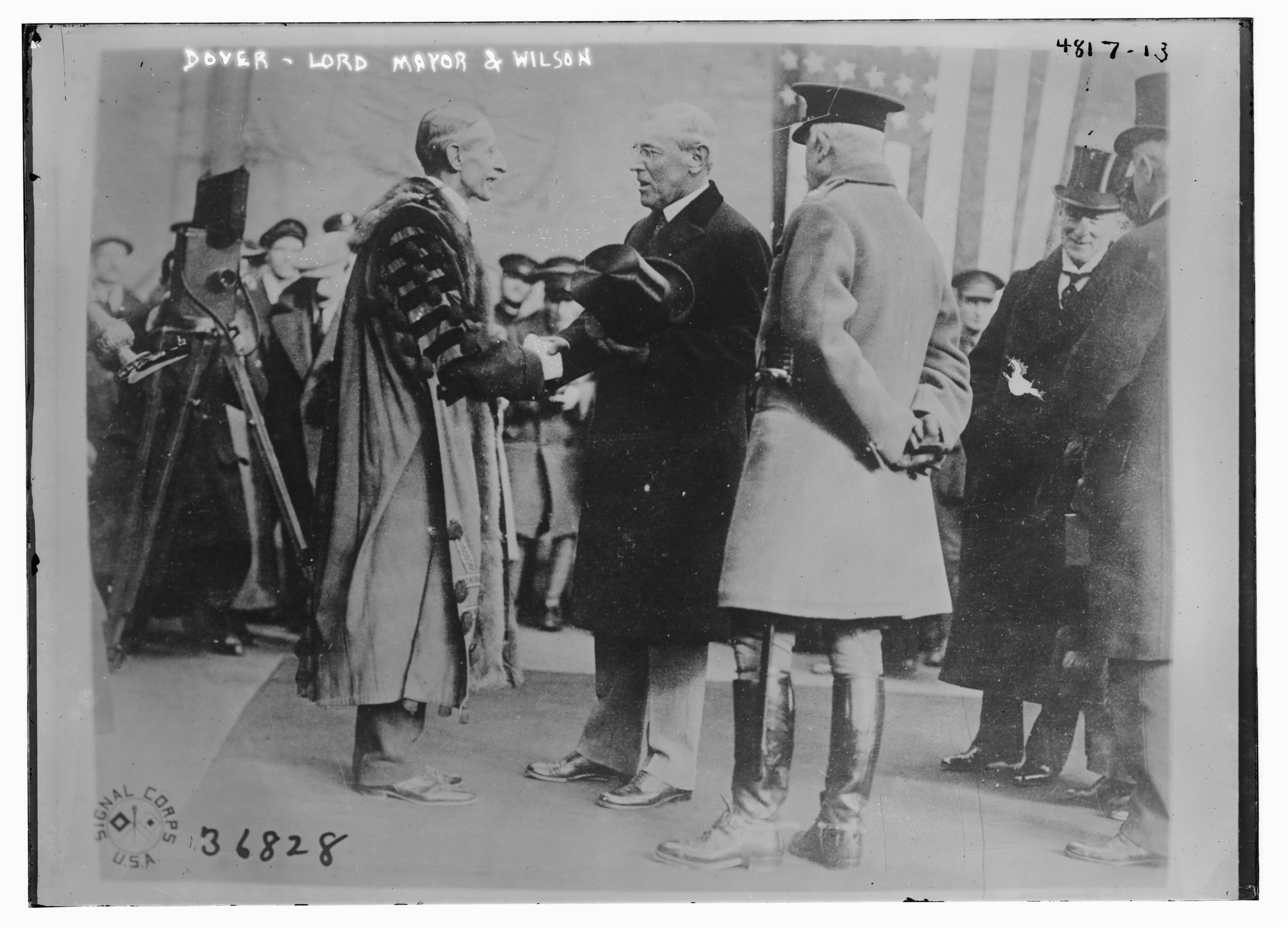
- Farley (left) shaking President Woodrow Wilson's hand in 1918.

Mayor of Dover
- In office 1913–1919

Personal details
- Born: Edwin Wood Thorp Farley; 1864 Dover, Kent, England
- Died: 9 January 1939 (aged 74–75)

Sir Edwin Wood Thorp Farley MBE (1864 – 9 January 1939) was Mayor of Dover, Kent, England, from 1913 to 1919.

Farley was born in 1864 in Dover, Kent. He went to sea when he was twelve years old and sailed to India and China many times. He served on Dover Town Council for 27 years. For his services to Dover during the First World War he was appointed Member of the Order of the British Empire (MBE) in 1918 and knighted in the 1920 New Year Honours.
