= Robert Taylor (mining engineer) =

British mining engineer in India

Sir Robert Taylor (1855 – 4 April 1921) was a British mining engineer in India. He was senior partner with John Taylor & Sons Ltd and a director of the Mysore Gold Mining Company Ltd.

He was knighted in the 1920 New Year Honours for his services to India. John Taylor & Sons Ltd went into receivership in 1922, the year after his death.
