= Charles Kesteven =

British solicitor

Sir Charles Henry Kesteven (2 April 1866 – 13 January 1923) was a British solicitor who served as solicitor to the Government of India from 1904 to 1919, and solicitor to the Government of Bengal from 1919 to 1923. He was knighted in the 1920 New Year Honours.

He died in Calcutta, aged 56.
