= William Sarel =

William Samuel Sarel CB CBE (18 August 1861 – 5 August 1933) was a British civil servant who served as Assistant and then Deputy Accountant-General of the Navy.

He was appointed Commander of the Order of the British Empire (CBE) in 1918 and Companion of the Order of the Bath (CB) in the 1920 New Year War Honours.
