= Harry Livesey =

British engineer

Sir Harry Livesey GBE

Director of Contracts, Admiralty
- In office May 1917 – December 1918

Deputy Director of Inland Waterways and Docks, War Office
- In office August 1916 – May 1917

Personal details
- Born: 30 May 1860
- Died: 21 June 1932 (aged 72) Monte Carlo, Monaco
- Occupation: Civil engineer

Sir Harry Livesey (30 May 1860 – 21 June 1932) was a British civil engineer.

Livesey served as Deputy Director of Inland Waterways and Docks at the War Office from August 1916 to May 1917, when he became Director of Contracts at the Admiralty, holding the post until December 1918.

He was appointed Knight Commander of the Order of the British Empire (KBE) in 1918 and Knight Grand Cross of the Order of the British Empire (GBE) in the 1920 civilian war honours.

He built Trull's Hatch, originally as a stud farm on his father's estate in Rotherfield and later as his own country house and owned Ascot Place from 1907 to 1911. He died in Monte Carlo aboard his yacht Jeannette on 21 June 1932.
