= Herbert Simmonds =

British civil servant (1867–1950)

Herbert John Simmonds CB CBE (21 May 1867 – 29 September 1950) was a British civil servant and barrister.

The son of a barrister, Simmonds was educated at Repton School and Christ's College, Cambridge, where he read History. He was called to the bar in 1892. He joined the Charity Commission in 1895 and became a Junior Examiner with the Board of Education in 1902. He was appointed Assistant Secretary to the Board of Education in 1911 and Legal Adviser in 1925, retiring in 1928.

He was appointed Officer of the Order of the British Empire (OBE) in the January 1919 War Honours for his work as Secretary to the Advisory Committee of the Military Service (Civil Liabilities) Committee and Companion of the Order of the Bath (CB) in the 1920 New Year War Honours. He was later appointed Commander of the Order of the British Empire (CBE).
