= George Anderson (educator) =

British schoolteacher and educational administrator

Sir George Anderson CSI CIE (15 May 1876 – 15 May 1943) was a British schoolteacher and educational administrator who spent most of his career in India.

Anderson was educated at Winchester College and University College, Oxford, graduating in 1899 with honours in Modern History. He became an assistant master at a school in Eastbourne, but in 1903 joined the Transvaal Education Department.

Transferring to India, he was successively Professor of History at Elphinstone College, Bombay, Assistant Secretary of the Indian Education Department, Secretary to the Calcutta University Commission, Director of Public Instruction of the Punjab (from 1920), and Educational Commissioner of the Government of India. He retired in 1936.

He was appointed Companion of the Order of the Indian Empire (CIE) in the 1920 New Year Honours, was knighted in the 1924 New Year Honours, and appointed Companion of the Order of the Star of India (CSI) in 1932.

Anderson wrote several books, including Expansion of India, British Administration in India and Christian Education in India.
