= Walter Risley Hearn =

British diplomat (1853–1930)

Portrait by Walter Stoneman, 1925

Sir Walter Risley Hearn, KBE (30 April 1853 – 2 January 1930) was a British consul.

Hearn's father was private secretary to Henry Petty-Fitzmaurice, 5th Marquess of Lansdowne. After serving as private secretary for some years to Sir William Gregory, Governor of Ceylon, Hearn was appointed Vice-Consul at Christiania in 1883, Consul at Rio Grande do Sul in 1890, at Cadiz in 1895, at Bordeaux in 1897, Consul-General at Havre in 1903, at San Francisco in 1907, at Hamburg in 1911, and at Paris from 1914 to 1919, when he retired.

He was appointed KBE in 1920 "For services in connection with the War".
