= Walter Gates (civil servant) =

British civil servant

Walter George Gates CB (bapt. 3 June 1860 – 8 November 1936) was a British civil servant who served for his entire career with the General Post Office.

Gates was born in Croydon to George and Maria Gates. He was the elder brother of Sir Frank Gates, a distinguished colonial officer. He was educated at the King's School, Canterbury and joined the civil service in 1880. In 1892, he was appointed assistant director of the GPO Investigation Branch, becoming director in 1900. From 1910 to his retirement in 1921, he was assistant secretary for home mails. He was appointed Companion of the Order of the Bath (CB) in the 1920 New Year Honours.
