= William Gradwell-Goodwin =

Sir William Gradwell-Goodwin JP

Mayor of Newcastle-under-Lyme
- In office 1913–1920

Personal details
- Born: William Valters Summers Gradwell-Goodwin; 22 February 1862
- Died: 26 January 1942 (aged 79)

Sir William Valters Summers Gradwell-Goodwin JP (22 February 1862 – 26 January 1942) was the Mayor of Newcastle-under-Lyme, Staffordshire, England, from 1913 to 1920. He was knighted in the 1920 New Year Honours for his services to the town during the First World War.
