= Nalini Ranjan Chatterjee =

Indian judge

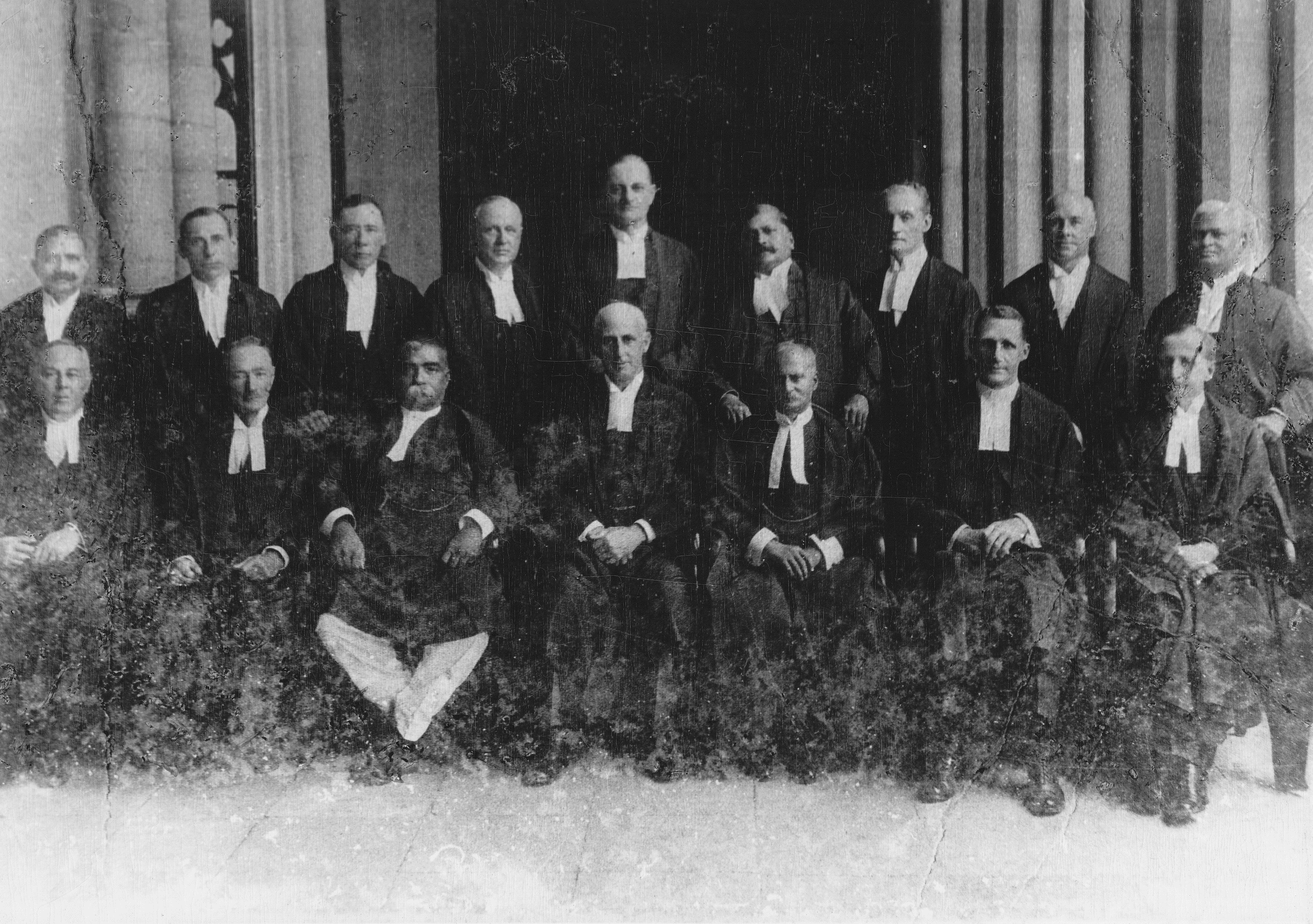
Front Row, Centre – Sir Asutosh Mukherjee, Sir Lancelot Sanderson (Chief Justice), Sir Nalini Ranjan Chatterjee

Sir Nalini Ranjan Chatterjee (died 6 September 1942) was a judge of the Calcutta High Court, India from 1910 to 1926 and officiated as Acting Chief Justice on three occasions. He was knighted in the 1920 New Year Honours. He became a member of the Viceroy's Executive Council post retirement.

It was said of Chatterjee by then Chief Justice Sir George Rankin that not a single judgment of the former was set aside by the Privy Council.

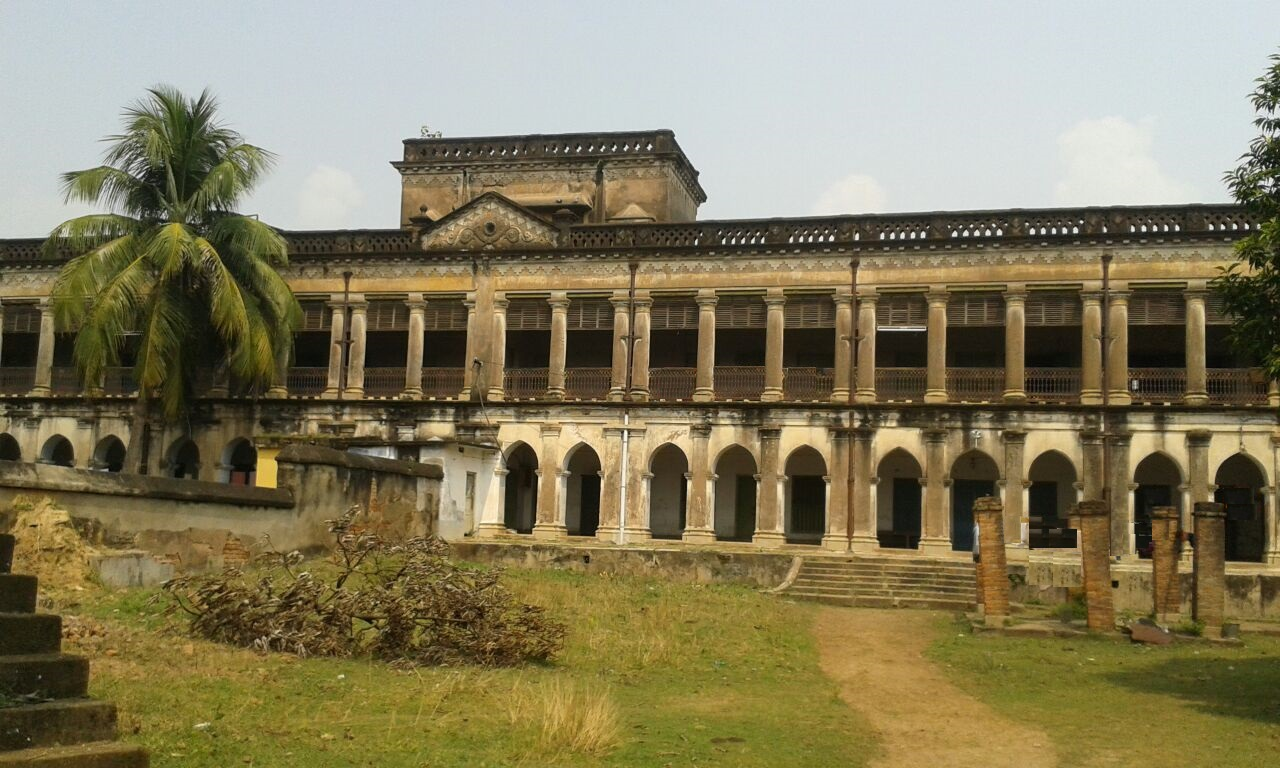
Chatterjee's residence in Nabogram, 30 km before Santiniketan en route from Calcutta.
