= Alexander Brebner =

British civil engineer

Sir Alexander Brebner CIE (19 August 1883 – 5 March 1979) was a British civil engineer who spent most of his career in India.

Brebner was born in Edinburgh, where he was educated at George Watson's College and the University of Edinburgh. He joined the Indian Public Works Department as an Assistant Engineer in 1906 and was promoted to Executive Engineer in 1912. He was appointed Under-Secretary in Bihar and Orissa in 1919 and Under-Secretary to the Government of India later the same year, a position he held until 1923 when he was promoted to Superintending Engineer. He served as Chief Engineer to the Government of India from 1931 until his retirement in 1938.

Returning to his native Scotland, Brebner served as Chief Divisional Food Officer for Scotland with the Ministry of Food from 1940 to 1942 and Licensing Officer for Scotland with the Ministry of Works from 1942 to 1954. He also served on the Council and Executive of the National Trust for Scotland until 1961 and on the Board of the Scottish Special Housing Association from 1954 to 1961, and was Acting Secretary of the Royal Scottish Academy from 1954 to 1955. From 1957 to 1964, he served on the ruling council of the influential Edinburgh conservationist body the Cockburn Association.

Brebner was appointed Companion of the Order of the Indian Empire (CIE) in the 1920 New Year Honours and was knighted on his retirement from India in 1938.
