= Basanta Mullick =

Indian civil servant and judge

Sir Basanta Kumar Mullick (2 August 1868 – 1 October 1931) was an Indian civil servant and judge.

Mullick was born in Calcutta, the son of a successful barrister. He was educated in England, at University College School and King's College, Cambridge, and joined the Indian Civil Service in 1887. In 1890 he was posted to Bengal as an assistant magistrate and collector. In 1898 he returned to Cambridge to complete his degree, which he received the following year.

On returning to India he was appointed a District and Sessions Judge and in April 1912 he was appointed Remembrancer for Legal Affairs of the newly created province of Bihar and Orissa. Soon afterwards he was appointed an Additional Judge of the Calcutta High Court and in 1916 became a founding Puisne Judge of the Patna High Court, serving until 1928. He was knighted in the 1920 New Year Honours.

In April 1928 he became a temporary member of the Executive Council of Bihar and Orissa and in July 1929 he was appointed to the Council of India, the first Indian member of the Indian Civil Service ever to join the council. He represented India on a number of committees of the League of Nations.

Mullick, who had married Kate Annie Carter in 1900, died suddenly at his home in Kensington, London, while still in office.
