= Louise Samuel =

English suffragist and charity worker (1870 –1925)

Dame Louise Samuel DBE

Honorary Secretary of the Conservative Women's Franchise Association
- In office 1908–1918

Personal details
- Born: Louise Victoria Steibel; 5 August 1870
- Died: 13 October 1925 (aged 55)
- Occupation: Suffragist, charity worker

Dame Louise Victoria Samuel, DBE (née Steibel; 5 August 1870 – 13 October 1925), sometimes called Louise Gilbert Samuel, was an English suffragist and charity worker.

Samuel was born on 5 August 1870. She was the daughter of Isaac Steibel. In 1889 she married Gilbert Ellis Samuel, son of Edwin Samuel and brother of Sir Stuart Samuel and Herbert Samuel, Viscount Samuel.

From its foundation in 1908 until its dissolution in 1918, she served as honorary secretary of the Conservative Women's Franchise Association, a non-militant women's suffrage movement.

In 1919, Samuel was elected to Chelsea Borough Council for the Municipal Reform Party. In August 1914, she co-founded the War Refugees' Committee. She was a member of the Managing Committee and head of the Health Section throughout the First World War.

In 1918, she was appointed Officer of the Order of the British Empire (OBE) for her refugee work. She was appointed Dame Commander of the Order of the British Empire (DBE) in the 1920 civilian war honours.

Samuel died on 13 October 1925.

== Sources ==
- Obituaries, The Times, 14 October 1925 and 16 October 1925
