= Charles Brigstocke =

British civil servant

Charles Reginald Brigstocke CB (22 July 1876 – 7 April 1951) was a British civil servant.

Brigstocke was born in Carmarthen, Wales, and educated at Llandovery School. He entered the Civil Service in 1894. In 1901 he was called to the bar by the Middle Temple. Between 1903 and 1918 he worked at the Admiralty. In 1918 he transferred to the Air Ministry and was appointed Assistant Secretary in 1919, serving with the air delegation at the Versailles Conference. For these services he was appointed Companion of the Order of the Bath (CB) in the 1920 New Year Honours.

From 1921 to 1932 he served as Director of Contracts at the Air Ministry, and from 1932 until his retirement in 1936 he was Principal Assistant Secretary.
