= William Thomas Frederick Davies =

South African surgeon, army officer and politician

- Born: 1860
- Died: 1947 (aged 86–87)
- Occupations: surgeon, army officer, politician
- Known for: President of the South African Medical Council

Lieutenant-Colonel William Thomas Frederick Davies CMG DSO (13 August 1860 – 24 June 1947) was a South African surgeon, army officer and politician.

Davies trained at Guy's Hospital in London. In the South African War he served as Surgeon-Major with the Imperial Light Horse and was awarded the Distinguished Service Order (DSO). From 1914 to 1915, he commanded the 2nd Imperial Light Horse in German South-West Africa, where he was wounded. From 1915 to 1917, he was a member of the South African House of Assembly, for which he was appointed Companion of the Order of St Michael and St George (CMG) in the 1920 New Year Honours.

In 1917, he joined the Royal Army Medical Corps and remained with the corps until 1919, serving as Surgeon Specialist at the General Military Hospital, Colchester. Returning home, he became President of the South African Medical Council.
