= Thomas Jaffrey =

Scottish actuary

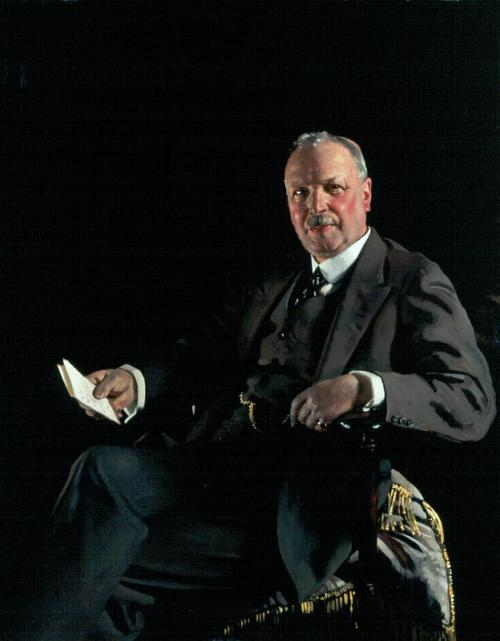
Sir Thomas Jaffrey by Sir William Orpen, (ca.1920-1926)

Sir Thomas Jaffrey, 1st Baronet (11 April 1861 – 23 July 1953) was a Scottish actuary and a prominent citizen of Aberdeen.

Jaffrey joined the North of Scotland Bank in 1877 and in 1892 was appointed actuary of the Aberdeen Savings Bank, a post he held for 37 years. After his retirement he served as the bank's consulting actuary until his death.

He was Lord Rector's Assessor in the Court of the University of Aberdeen from 1924 to 1937, chairman of the Aberdeen Art Gallery Committee and the Aberdeen branch of the Royal Horticultural Society. He founded the Jaffrey Chair of Political Economy at the university.

Jaffrey was knighted in the 1920 New Year Honours and created a Baronet of Edgehill in the Parish of Peterculter in the County of Aberdeen on 24 June 1931.

== Footnotes ==
Baronetage of the United Kingdom
New creation	Baronet; 1931–1953	Extinct
