= Cecil Hertslet =

British diplomat

Cecil Hertslet (21 August 1850 – 4 March 1934) was a British diplomat.

== Life ==
Cecil Hertslet was born on 21 August 1850. He attended King's College School and King's College, London.

He joined the Foreign Office in 1868, in the Chief Clerk's department, and moved to the Treaty Department in 1883. He was appointed consul general in Le Havre in 1896, and moved to Antwerp in that role in April 1903. He was still in Antwerp when the Germans invaded Belgium at the start of World War I. He took the consulate flag with him when he left, and returned it to the consulate after the Armistice in 1918. While Antwerp was occupied he was consul general at Zurich, from November 1915 to May 1917.

He married Euphemia Lee in 1887; they had a son and a daughter. He died in Bristol on 4 March 1934.

== Honours ==
He was knighted in 1905 and made a KBE in 1920. He was twice president of the Photographic Convention of the United Kingdom, at the 1908 and 1912 meetings, and was Fellow of the Royal Photographic Society. He was created a Companion of the Roll of Honour of the Memorial of Merit of King Charles the Martyr in 1925.

== Sources ==
- "Sir Cecil Hertslet, Diplomat, Dies at 83". The New York Times. 6 March 1934. p. 23.
- "Death of Sir Cecil Hertslet". The East Kent Times and Mail. 10 March 1934. p. 7.
