= James Kemnal =

English engineer and industrialist

Sir James Herman Rosenthal Kemnal FRSE (born James Hermann Rosenthal; 16 August 1864 – 8 February 1927) was an English engineer and industrialist. He changed his surname to Kemnal in 1915.

Kemnal was born in Rotherhithe in London to a naturalised British father, David Ferdinand Rosenthal, who was a dealer in china and glass, and his wife, Elizabeth Marshall, from Poplar. He was educated at the University of Cologne and undertook an apprenticeship at the engineering works of the Belgian State Railways before joining the Anderston Foundry Co Ltd in Glasgow.

In about 1883, Kemnal joined the American boiler manufacturers Babcock & Wilcox and was soon running their London office. In 1891, a completely independent British branch of Babcock & Wilcox was founded and Kemnal became managing director, a post he held for the rest of his life. The company expanded rapidly and opened branches in France, Germany, Poland, Italy, and Japan.

In 1915, he was elected a Fellow of the Royal Society of Edinburgh. His proposers were Sir Archibald Denny, Thomas Parker, Alexander Cleghorn, and James Currie.

He was knighted in the 1920 New Year Honours for his services to munitions production during the First World War.

In 1889 he married his cousin, Amelia Marshall. They divorced in 1903. In 1906 he married Linda Larita de Leuze. In 1915, they had a son, Stuart Kemnal.

He died at Sandbanks in Dorset on 8 February 1927.
