= Walter F. Gates =

Upper Canada politician and merchant

Walter Freeman Gates (died February 5, 1828) was a merchant and political figure in Upper Canada. He represented Grenville County in the Legislative Assembly of Upper Canada from 1820 to 1824.

Gates was educated by the Reverent John Strachan. He lived in Johnstown. Gates served as a captain in a cavalry unit in the militia. He was named a justice of the peace for the Johnstown District in 1821. He died in Johnstown.
