= William Gallagher (civil servant) =

British civil servant

Sir William Gallagher CB ISO (18 November 1851 – 5 August 1933) was a British civil servant who served as Chief Inspector of Customs. He was knighted in the 1916 Birthday Honours and appointed Companion of the Order of the Bath (CB) in the 1920 New Year Honours.
