= Frederick Butler =

British civil servant (1873–1961)

Butler in 1940.

Sir Frederick George Augustus Butler KCMG CB (5 April 1873 – 30 March 1961) was a British civil servant.

Butler was educated at Bradford Grammar School and Trinity College, Oxford, where he obtained firsts in Classical Moderations and greats. In 1896 he joined the Civil Service as a clerk in the Admiralty, but transferred to the West Africa Department of the Colonial Office in 1897. In 1899 he was appointed secretary to the West African Currency Committee. In 1904 he became private secretary to the Duke of Marlborough, then Parliamentary Under-Secretary of State for the Colonies, and remained in office when Marlborough was succeeded by Winston Churchill in 1905. From 1912 to 1916, he was private secretary to the Secretary of State for the Colonies, serving Lewis Harcourt and then Bonar Law.

In 1916, he was promoted to principal clerk and in 1917, was appointed director of the overseas division of the Foreign Office, Department of Overseas Trade, a post he held until 1933, when he was promoted to assistant under-secretary of state for foreign affairs. He retired in 1938, although he returned to the Foreign Office during the Second World War from September 1939 to September 1940.

Butler was appointed Companion of the Order of St Michael and St George (CMG) in 1915, Companion of the Order of the Bath (CB) in 1917, and Knight Commander of the Order of St Michael and St George (KCMG) in the 1920 New Year Honours.
