= George D. Fowler =

American railroad executive (1860–1909)

George D. Fowler (1860 – October 14, 1909) was a Pennsylvania Railroad official. He was considered an authority on golf. He was President of the American Society of Signal Engineers.

He was born in 1860 in Alexandria, Virginia. He was closely related to George Washington and was a brother-in-law of Fitzhugh Lee.

He became president of the American Society of Signal Engineers.

He died of heart disease on October 14, 1909, at the Rittenhouse Club in Philadelphia, Pennsylvania.
