= William Carter (mayor of Windsor) =

English insurance executive and mayor

Alderman Sir William Carter JP

Mayor of Windsor
- In office 1908–1928

Personal details
- Born: 25 May 1848 Marlow, Buckinghamshire, England
- Died: 14 October 1932 (aged 84)
- Occupation: Insurance executive

Sir William Carter JP (25 May 1848 – 14 October 1932) was an English insurance executive who was elected Mayor of Windsor, Berkshire, thirteen times.

Carter was born in Marlow, Buckinghamshire, and became a painter and decorator and later a gardener. He then joined the Prudential Assurance Company as a clerk and served successively at their offices in Marlow, Maidenhead and Windsor, becoming superintendent of the Windsor office in 1879 and remaining there until his retirement in 1908.

He was elected to Windsor Town Council in November 1902 and became an Alderman in November 1922. He served as mayor from 1908 to 1928, serving throughout the First World War when there were no elections. For these services he was knighted in the 1920 New Year Honours.
