= George Frederick Howe =

British civil servant and barrister

George Frederick Howe CB (1856 – 7 December 1937) was a British civil servant and barrister.

Howe was born in Redhill, Surrey, and educated at Reigate Grammar School. He joined the Civil Service and was appointed to the Inland Revenue as an Inspector of Taxes in 1875. He was called to the bar by Gray's Inn in 1893.

In about 1890, Howe was sent to Dublin to formulate plans to deal with the large arrears of property tax that had built up during the agricultural unrest in Ireland. He remained in Ireland for eleven years. In 1907 he was appointed one of the two Special Commissioners of Income Tax. He later became Presiding Special Commissioner, a post he held until his retirement in 1921. He was appointed Companion of the Order of the Bath (CB) in the 1920 New Year Honours.
