= Phil Hansen =

Phil Hansen may refer to:

- Phil Hansen (artist) (born 1979), American artist
- Phil Hansen (American football) (born 1968), retired player of American football and Republican candidate for State Senate in Minnesota in 2012
- Phil L. Hansen (1923–1992), Attorney General of Utah

== See also ==
- Philip Hanson (civil servant) (1871–1955), British civil servant
- Philip Hanson (racing driver)
