= Alfred Temple =

Sir Alfred George Temple FSA (27 October 1848 – 8 January 1928) was the director of the Guildhall Art Gallery in London, England, from 1886 to 1928.

Temple was born in London and educated at Denmark Hill Grammar School. He joined an underwriting firm as a junior clerk, but was sacked two years later for throwing a ledger at a senior clerk. Six months later he joined the Town Clerk's Department of the City of London Corporation, following in the footsteps of his father, grandfather and great-uncle, who had served the corporation for a total of 85 years between them.

He took evening classes at the Lambeth School of Art and the South Kensington Museum (now the Victoria and Albert Museum), and when the corporation established the Guildhall Art Gallery in 1886, Temple was appointed its first director, a post he held until his death. He built up the collection into one of the best in England and also wrote many books and articles on art.

Temple was knighted in the 1920 New Year Honours.

He died at his home in College Road, Dulwich, South London, and was buried at nearby West Norwood Cemetery.
