= Leonard Rowland =

Welsh politician

Sir Leonard Bromfield Rowland (29 December 1862 – 18 December 1939) served as mayor of Wrexham, Wales from 1915 to 1919.

Born in Wrexham and educated at Grove Park School in the town, he was elected to Wrexham Town Council in 1908. He was knighted in the 1920 New Year Honours for services to Wrexham.
