= Herbert Ormond =

English draper and politician (1867–1934)

Sir Herbert John Ormond (17 October 1867 – 23 August 1934) was an English draper who was elected Mayor of Stoke Newington, London, eleven times, including throughout the First World War from 1913 to 1919 and from 1929 to 1934.

Ormond was educated at North London High School. Elected to the old vestry in 1899, he served on the borough council (formed in 1900) until his death (from an embolism of an artery), at which time he was serving as mayor for the eleventh time. He was knighted in the 1920 New Year Honours for his services to the borough.

A portrait of Ormond by Henry Scott Tuke is displayed at Stoke Newington Town Hall.

He was buried at Abney Park Cemetery in Stoke Newington, where his memorial stands today.
