= Henry Gauvain =

British surgeon

Sir Henry Gauvain FRCS JP
- Sir Henry Gauvain, Hampshire Telegraph, 4 August 1939.
- Born: Henry John Gauvain; 28 November 1878; Alderney, Channel Islands
- Died: 19 January 1945 (aged 66); Morland Hall, Alton, Hampshire, England
- Occupations: Surgeon, tuberculosis specialist

Sir Henry John Gauvain FRCS JP (28 November 1878 – 19 January 1945) was a British surgeon and tuberculosis specialist.

Gauvain was born on the island of Alderney, the son of William Gauvain and Catherine Margaret le Ber. He was educated at Trowbridge, King's College, London, St John's College, Cambridge and Barts Hospital in London. In 1908, he became first medical superintendent of the Lord Mayor Treloar Cripples' Hospital and College, Alton, Hampshire, a position he held until his death.

Gauvain was a leading advocate of heliotherapy (sunlight therapy) in Britain. He wrote the foreword to the first English translation of Auguste Rollier's book Heliotherapy.

He was knighted in the 1920 New Year Honours for his services to the Lord Mayor Treloar Hospital.
