= Francis Greer =

British barrister and civil servant

Sir Francis Greer KCB KC

Third Parliamentary Counsel to HM Treasury
- In office 1923 – 6 February 1925

Parliamentary Draftsman to the Irish Office
- In office 1908–1923

Personal details
- Born: Francis Nugent Greer; 24 February 1869
- Died: 6 February 1925 (aged 55)

Sir Francis Nugent Greer KCB KC (24 February 1869 – 6 February 1925) was a British barrister and civil servant.

Greer was the son of Judge Samuel McCurdy Greer, a former Member of Parliament for County Londonderry. He was educated at Trinity College, Dublin and was called to the Irish Bar in 1893.

In 1908, he joined the Irish Office as Parliamentary Draftsman, holding the position until 1923 when he was appointed Third Parliamentary Counsel to HM Treasury. He held this post until his sudden death two years later.

Greer was called to the English Bar in 1912 and appointed a King's Counsel for Ireland in 1918. He was appointed Companion of the Order of the Bath (CB) in 1913, knighted in the 1920 New Year Honours, and appointed Knight Commander of the Order of the Bath (KCB) in 1923.
