= Norris Foster =

English barrister (1855–1925)

Sir Norris Tildasley Foster CBE (15 December 1855 – 5 December 1925) was an English barrister.

Foster was born in Bromsgrove, Worcestershire. He was educated at King Edward's School, Birmingham and the University of Oxford and called to the bar by the Inner Temple in 1891. He practised in Birmingham.

During the First World War he was a member of the Warwickshire County Appeal Tribunal under the Military Service Act 1916, the Parliamentary Recruiting Committee, the Birmingham Local War Pensions Committee, and the General Purposes, Finance and Administration Committee of the War Pensions and Citizens Committee.

He was knighted in the 1920 New Year Honours and appointed Commander of the Order of the British Empire (CBE) in the 1920 civilian war honours for his services to the Prince of Wales's Fund and the Birmingham War Pensions Committee.
