= Hugh Thornton (civil servant) =

British civil servant (1881–1962)

Sir Hugh Cholmondeley Thornton KCMG CVO (16 May 1881 – 8 March 1962) was a British civil servant.

Thornton was the son of a clergyman and was educated at Kelly College, Tavistock, Devon, and Christ Church, Oxford. He worked for Conservative Central Office from 1907 to 1914, when he was commissioned into the Middlesex Regiment. In 1915, as a Lieutenant, he transferred to the Duke of Cornwall's Light Infantry, being promoted Captain and Major later the same year. In December 1916 he was appointed private secretary to Lord Milner in the War Cabinet, and accompanied him when he was appointed successively Secretary of State for War and Secretary of State for the Colonies.

In 1920, Thornton was appointed Second Crown Agent for the Colonies. He served as a Crown Agent until his retirement in 1943, ending his career as Senior Crown Agent. He was appointed both Companion of the Order of St Michael and St George (CMG) and Commander of the Royal Victorian Order (CVO) in the 1920 New Year Honours, and Knight Commander of the Order of St Michael and St George (KCMG) in 1943.

== Sources ==
- Wrench, John Evelyn, Alfred Lord Milner: The Man of No Illusions, London: Eyre & Spottiswoode, 1958
