= George Needham (businessman) =

English businessman (1843–1928)

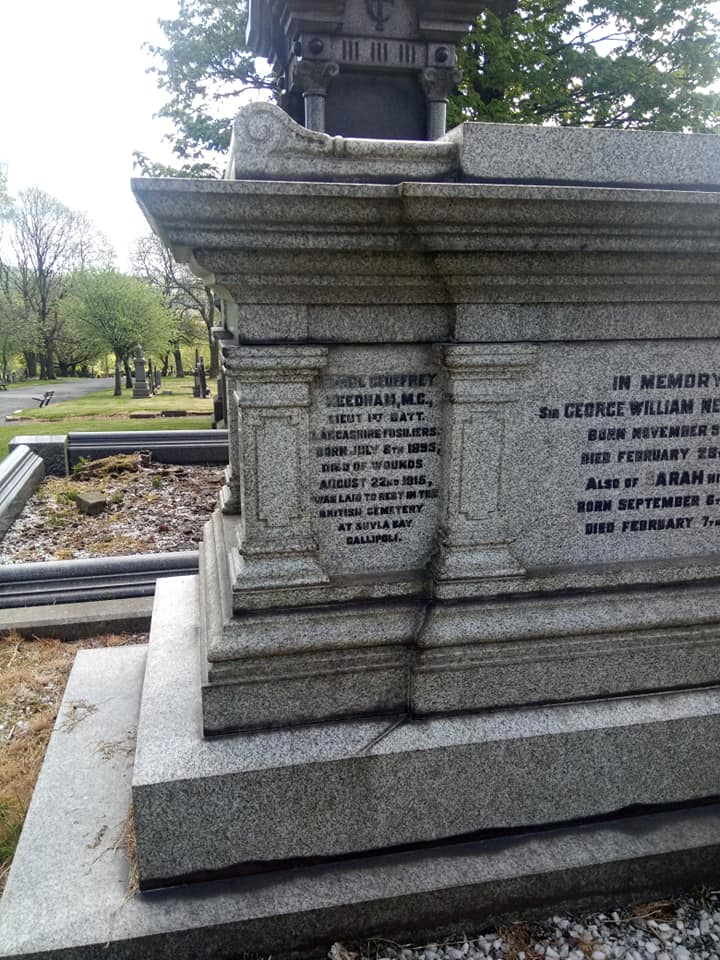

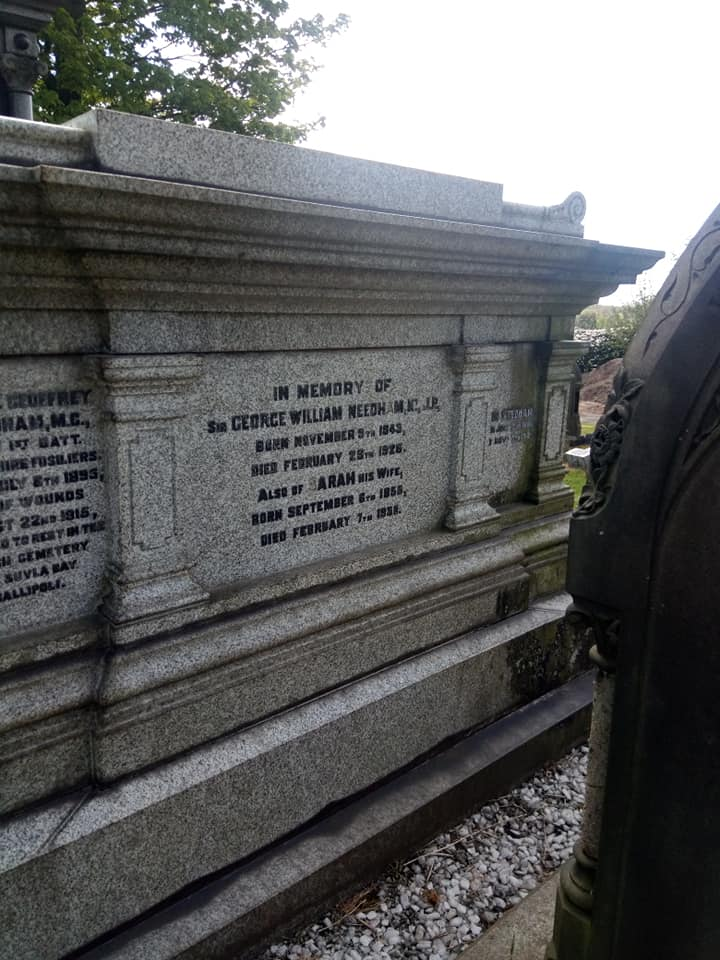

Sir George William Needham (9 November 1843 – 29 February 1928) was an English businessman and a prominent citizen of Oldham, Lancashire.

Needham was born in Oldham and educated at Oldham High School. At the age of sixteen he joined the textile machinery manufacturers Platt Bros & Co as a junior clerk, remaining with the company for his entire career and rising to become chairman.

He was a governor of Oldham Royal Infirmary for 35 years and served as president in 1916–1917. He also gave an endowment to the hospital in memory of his son, who was killed in action at Gallipoli.

For his services to Oldham, Needham was knighted in the 1920 New Year Honours.

On 21 February 1928, while visiting Bournemouth with his wife, Needham fell while boarding a tram and suffered head injuries. He died in a local nursing home eight days later.
