= F. R. Nethersole =

Lieutenant-Colonel Frederick Ralph Nethersole CIE (17 August 1865 – 6 July 1933) was an Indian Army officer and administrator in Burma.

Nethersole was educated at Sutton Valence School and Emmanuel College, Cambridge and was commissioned into the Royal Irish Regiment in 1889. In 1890 he transferred to the 17th Bengal Infantry. From 1892 to 1897 he served with the Burma Military Police. He served with the Burma Commission from 1898 onwards, his final posting being as Deputy Commissioner of Tharrawaddy in the Pegu Division until his retirement in 1921.

He was appointed Companion of the Order of the Indian Empire (CIE) in the 1920 New Year Honours.
