= Malcolm Robinson =

British Chief Inspector of Factories from 1917 to 1920

Sir Hugh Malcolm Robinson CB ISO (12 February 1857 – 27 August 1933) was Chief Inspector of Factories of the British Government from 1917 to 1920.

Robinson was born in York, the son of Canon H. G. Robinson of York Minster. He was educated at Harrow School and New College, Oxford, and rowed in the Oxford eight in the University Boat Race of 1879.

Robinson was appointed an Inspector of Factories in 1882 and promoted to Deputy Chief Inspector in 1908 and Chief Inspector in 1917. He was appointed a Companion of the Imperial Service Order (ISO) in 1912, Companion of the Order of the Bath (CB) in 1918 and knighted in the 1920 New Year Honours shortly before his retirement.

== See also ==
- List of Oxford University Boat Race crews
