= James Thursfield =

British naval historian and journalist

Sir James Richard Thursfield (16 November 1840 – 22 November 1923) was a British naval historian and journalist. As well as being an authority on naval matters, he was also the first editor of the Times Literary Supplement.

== Biography ==
Thursfield was born in Kidderminster and educated at Merchant Taylors' School, Northwood and Corpus Christi College, Oxford, where he obtained a first-class degree in Literae Humaniores in 1863. He was appointed to a fellowship of Jesus College, Oxford in 1864, holding this until 1881, when he was obliged to resign because of his marriage in 1880. While at Oxford he approached William Morris in 1877 to ask if he would be prepared to stand for the position of Professor of Poetry at Oxford. Morris declined the invitation. After leaving Oxford, Thursfield was appointed by Thomas Chenery, editor of The Times, as a leader writer. He soon established himself as an authority on naval matters, publishing works such as The Navy and the Nation (1897), Nelson and other Naval Studies (1909), and Naval Warfare (1913). He lectured on naval strategy to the Staff College, Camberley and the Royal United Service Institution.

Thursfield was close to successive First Lords of the Admiralty, of various political views, and to Jackie Fisher in Fisher's campaign for navy reforms. Fisher regarded Thursfield as "a great student of naval affairs", saying that his articles were "close and precisely reasoned, unadulterated by vituperation". Prince Louis of Battenberg, who served for a time as director of naval intelligence, praised Thursfield for never being afraid to state a contrary view.

Thursfield worked in other areas apart from naval matters, taking charge of The Times's "Books of the week" in 1891, which became the Times Literary Supplement in 1902, of which he was the first editor. He wrote a biography of Robert Peel in 1891. He was made an honorary fellow of Jesus College in 1908. He was knighted in the 1920 New Year Honours.

He died at his home in Golders Green on 22 November 1923. His son, Henry George Thursfield, became a Rear-Admiral and later followed his father as naval correspondent for The Times between 1936 and 1952.
