= James Macklin =

English jeweller and farmer (1864–1944)

Sir James Macklin, DL, JP (23 September 1864 – 17 April 1944) was an English jeweller and farmer, active in public life in Wiltshire.

== Early life and business career ==
Macklin was born in West Harnham, near Salisbury, on 23 September 1864, the son of James Macklin (senior) and his wife, Sarah.

When the national census of England was taken in April 1871, James Macklin (senior) was described as a jeweller's shopman, living in West Harnham with his wife, four daughters and three sons. He later went into business as a cutler at No. 7 Catherine Street in Salisbury, and the business became well known as James Macklin & Son, watchmakers and jewellers, silversmiths and cutlers.

When the census was taken in April 1881, Macklin was described as an assistant in his father's business, living and working at No. 7 Catherine Street with his father (now described as a cutler, employing one man and one boy), mother, three sisters, two brothers and nephew.

Eventually Macklin took over the running of the business. When the census was taken in April 1891, he was described as a jeweller, living and working at No. 7 Catherine Street with his wife and a domestic servant.

At the April 1911 census, he described himself as a retired jeweller, living at Watersmeet in Harnham with his wife, two daughters, son, and domestic servant.

Macklin demonstrated significant business acumen. "Succeeding to an old-established business, which represents the last of the old cutlery trade, for which Salisbury at one time had a considerable reputation, he considerably extended its scope, and retired very early in life to a beautiful home he created for himself at East Harnham. ... Acquiring considerable property in the old village, which was incorporated into the borough [of Salisbury] in 1904, Mr. Macklin readily gave up land to improve the roads, and generally devoted himself to the interests of the parish. He has lately given considerable attention to agricultural pursuits, in conjunction with his son, and is in occupation of a large farm at Tytherley."

In the years that followed, he concentrated on his farming interests.

== Mayor of Salisbury ==
Macklin served six successive terms as mayor of Salisbury, commencing in November 1913, and coming to an end in 1919. His incumbency of the office coincided with the First World War.

On 16 September 1918, Macklin "was presented to His Majesty [King George V] by Lieut.-General Sir Henry Sclater. The King said to him, 'I understand, Mr. Mayor, that you have been Mayor of the city for five years. I am very grateful to you for the unselfish way in which you have devoted yourself to the services of the city and to myself.' The Mayor, acknowledging this gracious remark, said, with becoming modesty: 'I have to thank my colleagues for any success I have had Your Majesty,' and the King rejoined: 'Will you also express my thanks to your colleagues.' His Majesty, continuing, said he understood that his troops on [Salisbury] Plain had been well treated in the way of entertainments and hospitality at Salisbury. The Mayor assured His Majesty that the citizens had been pleased to do everything they could for the troops, and the King graciously added: 'I wish you to thank the citizens for all they have done for the soldiers.' His Majesty then expressed good wishes for the Mayor's health and said he wished the Mayor to convey his message to the citizens."

As mayor of the city, he was appointed as a magistrate for the Salisbury petty sessional division. He served as deputy mayor during 1919–1920, was made an alderman in 1919, and was given the freedom of the city of Salisbury in 1921.

== Honours ==
In January 1919 he was appointed a Deputy Lieutenant for Wiltshire.

He was knighted in the 1920 New Year Honours for his public and local services, receiving the accolade from King George V at Buckingham Palace on 4 March 1920.

== Last years ==
During his last years Macklin lived at Harnham Lodge in Salisbury. He continued to serve as an alderman on the Salisbury City Council, at least until November 1943, and was chairman of the Salisbury Gas Company.

He died in The Nursing Home, Salisbury, on 17 April 1944.

== Family ==
Macklin was married in 1890 to Barbara Emily Main, the daughter of George John Masters Main and his wife, Emily Mariah (née Hayter). She was born in 1870. She was appointed Member of the Order of the British Empire (MBE) in 1919 for work among Colonial and British troops during the First World War, and was awarded the Golden Palms of the Order of the Crown, by the King of the Belgians in 1921 for work among Belgian refugees during the same conflict. She died in Salisbury on 19 November 1960.

Sir James and Lady Macklin had four children: Bernard James Macklin, born on 18 January 1893; Dulcie Emella Macklin, born on 15 February 1894; Harold George (Main) Macklin, born on 12 August 1898, and Phyllis Frances M. Macklin, born on 13 February 1904.

== Portrait ==
A portrait of Sir James Macklin by an unknown artist is held at Salisbury Guildhall.
