= George Fowler (magistrate) =

English solicitor

Sir George Fowler JP
- Born: George Jefford Fowler; 14 August 1858
- Died: 19 October 1937 (aged 79)
- Occupations: Solicitor, magistrate

Sir George Jefford Fowler JP (14 August 1858 – 19 October 1937) was an English solicitor who served as Chief Magistrate for Kingston upon Thames for thirty years.

Fowler was born in Exeter and admitted a solicitor (like his father) in 1879. He was knighted in the 1920 New Year Honours for his services as a magistrate and retired as senior partner of Fowler, Legg & Co, Bedford Row, London, in 1931.
