= Philip Hanson (civil servant) =

British civil servant

Sir Philip Hanson CB

Chairman of the Commission of Public Works (Ireland)
- In office 1927–1934

Director-General of Contracts, Ministry of Munitions
- In office 1915–1919

Personal details
- Born: Philip Herbert Hanson; 18 September 1871 Bradford, West Riding of Yorkshire, England
- Died: 23 October 1955 (aged 84) Dublin, Ireland

Sir Philip Herbert Hanson CB (18 September 1871 – 23 October 1955) was a British civil servant, who later served in the Irish Free State.

Hanson was born in Bradford, Yorkshire. He was educated at the Royal High School, Edinburgh, the University of Edinburgh, and Balliol College, Oxford, where he took a first in Greats. In 1895 he entered the Civil Service and joined the War Office.

From 1898 to 1903 he served as private secretary to George Wyndham as Under-Secretary of State for War and then Chief Secretary for Ireland. In 1903 he was appointed a Commissioner of Public Works in Ireland, serving with the Commission of Public Works until his retirement in 1934, except between 1915 and 1919 when he served with the Ministry of Munitions as Director-General of Contracts, Head of the American Department and Ministry Representative in Paris. He was chairman of the Commission of Public Works from 1927 to 1934.

He was appointed Companion of the Order of the Bath (CB) in 1917 and knighted in the 1920 New Year Honours for his work with the Ministry of Munitions.

He continued to live in Dublin until his death.

In 1914 he married Constance Geraldine Tyrrell, who became a prominent Dublin hostess.
