= 1920 Birthday Honours =

British government recognitions

The 1920 Birthday Honours were appointments by King George V to various orders and honours to reward and highlight good works by citizens of the British Empire. The appointments were made to celebrate the official birthday of The King, and were published in The London Gazette on 4 June 1920.

Prince Albert, the future King George VI, led the honours list as the only new peer, being invested as the Duke of York, while more than 60 men were knighted.

The recipients of honours are displayed here as they were styled before their new honour, and arranged by honour, with classes (Knight, Knight Grand Cross, etc.) and then divisions (Military, Civil, etc.) as appropriate.

== United Kingdom and British Empire ==
=== Duke, Earl, Baron ===
- His Royal Highness Prince Albert Frederick Arthur George KG as Baron Killarney, Earl of Inverness and Duke of York

=== Privy Councillor ===
The King appointed the following to His Majesty's Most Honourable Privy Council of the United Kingdom:

- Stanley Baldwin MP Financial Secretary to the Treasury since 1917
- Frederick George Kellaway MP one of the Parliamentary Secretaries to the Ministry of Munitions, December, 1916. Parliamentary and Financial Secretary to Ministry, 1918. Parliamentary Secretary and Deputy Minister, 1919. Member of Parliament for Bedford, 1910, and for Bedford Division, 1918. For Parliamentary Services
- The Hon. François Stephanus Malan, Minister of Agriculture, Mines, Industries and Education, Union of South Africa. Acted as prime minister for eight months during General Botha's absence.

The King appointed the following to His Majesty's Most Honourable Privy Council of Ireland:

- Hugh Thom Barrie MP Vice-president, Irish Department of Agriculture
- The Hon. Justice John Blake Powell KC Judge of the High Court of Justice in Ireland. Former Solicitor-General for Ireland.

=== Baronetcies ===
- John Anderson, managing director of Messrs. P. & W. A. Anderson, Ltd. For Public Services
- William Henry Aykroyd JP Partner in the Firm of Messrs. T. F. Firth & Sons, Brighouse. For Public and Local Services
- Capt. Ion Hamilton Benn CB DSO Member of Parliament for Greenwich since 1910. Member of Port of London Authority
- John Wyndham Beynon, Chairman South Wales Coal Owners Association. For Public Services.
- Sir Ernest William Glover, Director of the Ship Management Branch of the Ministry of Shipping
- The Rt. Hon. Thomas Frederick Halsey MP Member of Parliament for Hertfordshire, 1874–1906
- Sir Howard George Frank KCB Director-General of Lands, War Office, Air Ministry, and Ministry of Munitions. Chairman of Disposals Board
- Peter Jeffrey Mackie DL Deputy Lieutenant for Argyll, Ayr and Lanark. Has travelled extensively and written on Tariff Reform, Imperial Federation, and other political subjects. In 1918 made a gift of Pedigree Cattle to Rhodesia in order to encourage ranching and cattle breeding. Financed the Mackie Anthropological Expedition to Uganda
- Archibald Mitchelson, Chairman of Messrs. D. Davies & Sons, the Admiralty Collieries, Wharncliffe Collieries and Yorkshire Collieries. For Public and Local Services
- Arthur Francis Pease DL JP late Second Civil Lord of the Admiralty
- Frank Bernard Sanderson, Controller of Trench Warfare, National Filling Factories and Stores during the War. For Public Services.
- Milton Sheridan Sharp, Chairman of Bradford Dyers Association. For Public and Local Services.
- Sir George Frederick Sleight, largest Trawler Owner in the World. At the commencement of the War practically all his ships were commandeered by the Government for Mine Sweeping and Patrol purposes
- Herbert Smith, Member of Board of Control of Wool and Textile Industries. Chairman of Carpet Trade Rationing Committee. Chairman of Man Power and Protection Committee. For Public Services
- William Reardon Smith, Principal of St. Just Steamship Co., Leeds Shipping Co., and the Cornborough Shipping Line. For Public and Local Services
- John Henderson Stewart JP Partner of Messrs. Alexander Stewart & Son, of Dundee, Deputy Chairman of Sheffield Steel Products. Freeman of the City of London. For Public Services
- Philip Sidney Stott, Prominent in Lancashire business life. President of the Oldham Lyceum (a non-political institution)
- Sir George Alexander Touche, Member of Parliament for North Islington, 1910–1918
- General Sir Reginald Wingate GCB GCVO GBE KCMG DSO For long and Distinguished Public Services

=== Knight Bachelor ===
- Sidney Robert Alexander Mayor of Faversham 1908–1919. Public and municipal services
- Hugh Percy Allen Director of the Royal College of Music
- Professor Frederick William Andrewes Pathologist at St. Bartholomew's Hospital. For valuable work in medical research.
- Capt. David Wilson Barker, Captain Superintendent of the Training Ship Worcester
- Sydney Beauchamp, Resident Medical Officer to British Delegation during nearly the whole of the Peace Conference in Paris
- William Barrett Montfort Bird, Founder of the Salters' Institute of Industrial Chemistry for providing scholarships for graduates in chemical science to enable them to continue research work
- John Brown JP Member of Aberdeen Town Council and of Aberdeen Harbour Board. Chairman of Aberdeen Steam Trawling and Fishing Company and Steam Herring Fleet. For public and local services.
- Francis Morgan Bryant CBE MVO ISO Secretary of His Majesty's Private Secretary's Office, Buckingham Palace
- Arthur Benjamin Bryceson, Town Clerk of Woolwich for over 18 years. For public and municipal services.
- Major Gerald Arthur Fowler Burton. Raised considerable sums for Devonport War Hospital Supply Department and the Red Cross, and financed the Garrison Needlework Association during the War.
- Robert Burton Chadwick MP Director of Overseas Transport, Ministry of Munitions
- Ernest Clark CBE Secretary of the Royal Commission on the Income Tax
- His Honour Judge John Walker Craig KC former Recorder of Belfast and County Court Judge of Antrim
- Philip Dawson, Member of the Disposal Board, Ministry of Munitions
- Joseph Dobbie, For public and local services in Edinburgh.
- Major George Alexander Dolby, Mayor of Poole 1917–20, Chairman of Harbour Commissioners. For public and municipal services
- Robert Henry Glanfield, President of Wholesale Clothing Manufacturers Federation. For public services in connection with the supply and manufacture of clothing for H.M. Forces. Honorary Treasurer of Borstal Association
- Wemyss Grant-Wilson JP Hon. Director of the Borstal Association and Director of the Central Association for the aid of convicts on discharge from Penal Servitude and Preventive Detention
- Henry Gregg, Mayor of Tynemouth 1913–18; Member of Central Organisation for the county; chairman of all local Organisations and Committees during the War. For public and municipal services.
- Alderman Charles O'Brien Harding JP LRCP Mayor of Eastbourne in 1903 and from 1916 to 1919
- Edgar Josiah Harper Chief Valuer, Inland Revenue Department
- Professor James Blacklock Henderson Professor of Applied Mechanics, Royal Naval College, Greenwich
- Lieutenant-Colonel Maxwell Hicks CBE FCA For personal work in organising the Devonshire House War Work.
- Alderman James Peace Hinchliffe JP Chairman of West Riding of Yorkshire County Council. Chiefly responsible for formation of British Research Association for Woollen and Worsted Industries.
- Harry Hope, Member of Parliament for Stirling and Clackmannan, and formerly for Bute. President of Scottish Chamber of Agriculture 1908; Honorary President of National Farmers Union of Scotland; Member of Scottish Agricultural Commission, and of Departmental Committee appointed by the Secretary for Scotland to inquire into the poultry industry in Scotland.
- Louis Stanley Johnson, Member of Parliament for East Walthamstow from 1918; Mayor of Hackney for the whole five years of the War. For invaluable public work.
- Henry S. Keith JP Provost of Hamilton
- Walter Guy Coffin Kirkwood, late Secretary of Post Office, Edinburgh
- Major Charles McIver. For public services in Cheshire.
- Major George Espec John Manners DL JP Founder of the Boys Messenger Service
- Samuel Meeson Morris, Mayor of Shrewsbury 1901-2 and 1916–18. Chairman of local Food Control Committee. For public and municipal services.
- William Noble, Chief Engineer, General Post Office
- William Payne Perry CB Director of Finance, War Office
- Ernest Roney, Solicitor. For public services.
- George Royle, Mayor of Bedford 1903. Member of Town Council. For public and municipal services.
- James Simpson For public and local services in Edinburgh.
- Albert Frederick Stephenson DL For eminent public and local services in South Lancashire for over forty years.
- Henry William Verey, late Official Referee of Supreme Court
- William Henry Veno, President of Manchester Column Press Club. For public and local services.
- William Howell Walters, For public and local services.
- Alderman Zachariah Wheatley, Mayor of Abergavenny
- James Lawton Wingate, President of the Royal Scottish Academy

British India

- Colonel Hormasjee Eduljee Banatvala CSI Indian Medical Service (retired), late Inspector-General, Civil Hospitals, Assam
- Diwan Bahadur Pitta Thyagaraya Chetti Garu, President of the corporation, Madras
- Walter Erskine Crum OBE Partner of Messrs. Graham and Company, Calcutta, Bengal
- Henry Hubert Hayden CSI CIE Director, Geological Survey of India
- Abdul Karim Abdul Shakur Jamal CIE Merchant, Burma
- Lallubhai Asharan Shah, Judge of the High Court, Bombay
- Thomas Robert John Ward CIE MVO Inspector-General of Irrigation, Punjab

Colonies, Protectorates, etc.

- John Carruthers Beattie Principal of the University of the Cape of Good Hope, Union of South Africa
- The Hon. James Daniel Connolly, Agent-General for the State of Western Australia
- Colin Rees Davies, Chief Justice of Bermuda
- Lieutenant-Colonel Herman Melville Heyman, Member of the Legislative Council, Southern Rhodesia
- The Hon. Joseph Henry Wood, Senior Puisne Judge of the Supreme Court of the State of Victoria
- Major Edward Humphrey Manisty Leggett DSO Royal Engineers, Chairman East African Section, London Chamber of Commerce
- Thomas Joseph Lennard, vice-president of the Royal Colonial Institute
- John Roberts CMG of the City of Dunedin, New Zealand
- Henry Alexander Wickham, For services in connection with the rubber plantation industry in the Far East.
- Jeremiah Wilson CMG lately Postmaster-General of the Union of South Africa

=== The Most Honourable Order of the Bath ===
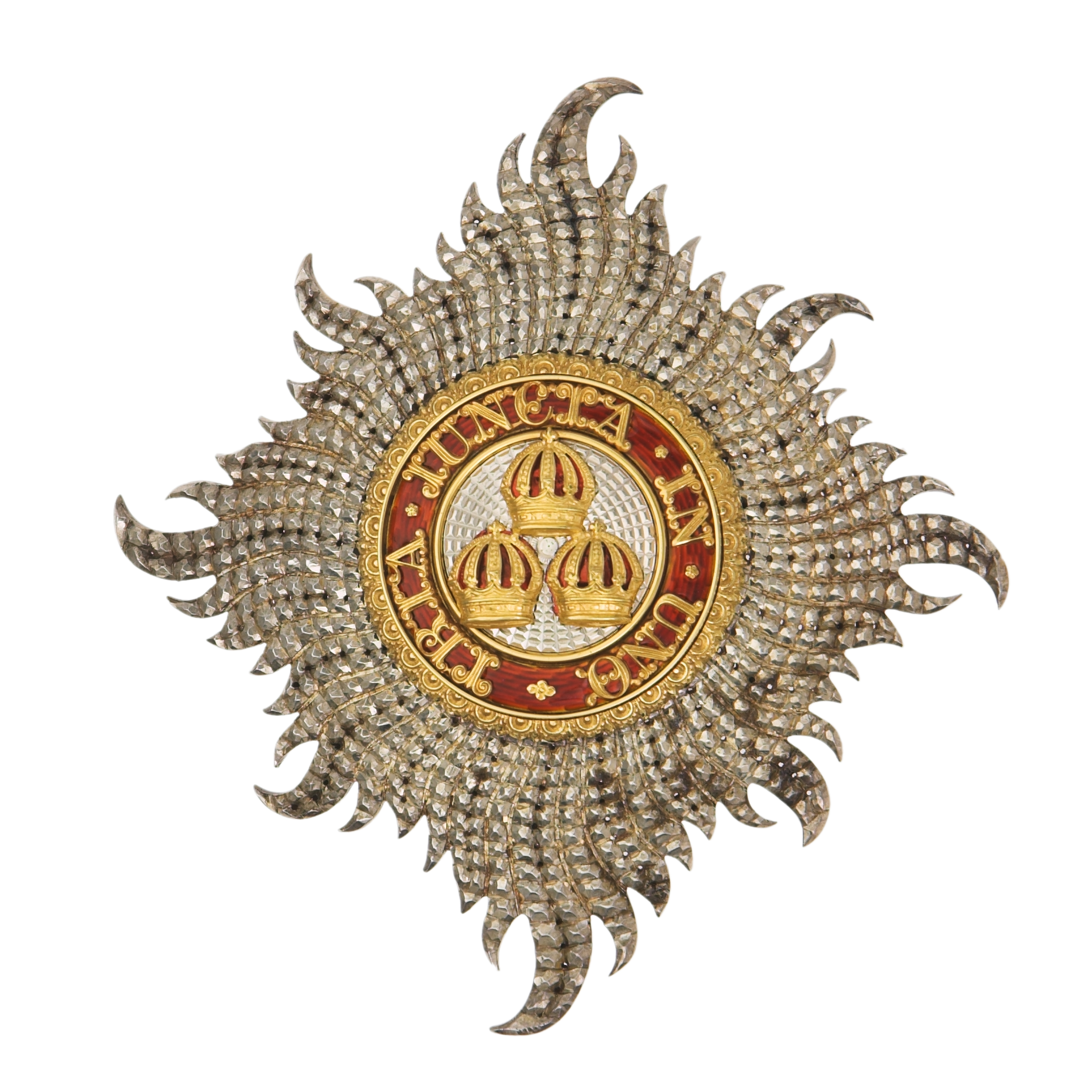
Civilian star of the Knight Grand Cross of the Order of the Bath

==== Knight Grand Cross of the Order of the Bath (GCB) ====
===== Civil Division =====
- The Rt. Hon. John Andrew, Baron Sumner. For work in connection with the Peace Treaty, and as Chairman of the London Reparation Committee

==== Knight Commander of the Order of the Bath (KCB) ====
===== Military Division =====
Royal Navy

- Vice-Admiral the Hon. Edward Stafford Fitzherbert CB
- Rear-Admiral Michael Culme-Seymour CB MVO

Army

- Lieutenant-General Sir George Mark Watson Macdonogh KCMG CB Adjutant-General to the Forces
- Lieutenant-General Sir Travers Edwards Clarke KCMG CB Quartermaster-General to the Forces

Royal Air Force

- Rear-Admiral Cecil Foley Lambert, Director of Personnel, Air Ministry, and a Member of the Air Council
- Air Vice-Marshal Edward Leonard Ellington CB CMG CBE Director-General of Supply and Research Air Ministry, and a Member of the Air Council

===== Civil Division =====
- Cecil James Barrington Hurst CB KC Legal Adviser to the Foreign Office
- Sir Alfred William Watson, Government Actuary and President of the Institute of Actuaries

==== Companion of the Order of the Bath (CB) ====
===== Military Division =====
Royal Navy

- Vice-Admiral Cecil Spencer Hickley MVO
- Rear-Admiral Henry Lancelot Mawbey
- Surgeon Rear-Admiral George Albert Dreaper
- Captain John Roderick Segrave
- Paymaster Captain Frederick Wilkin Iago Airey

Army

- Major-General Charles William Grant Richardson CSI Deputy Quartermaster-General, India
- Colonel Frederick James Moberley CSI DSO Director of Military Operations, India
- Lieutenant-Colonel and Brevet Colonel Harry Simonds de Brett CMG DSO Assistant Adjutant-General
- Lieutenant-Colonel Denis Paul CMG CBE Royal Army Ordnance Corps

Royal Air Force

- Lieutenant-Colonel James Grimwood DSO OBE FSA

===== Civil Division =====
- Alfred William Cope, Second Secretary, Ministry of Pensions
- John Whelan Dulanty CBE Assistant Secretary, Ministry of Munitions
- Alexander Flint, Assistant Secretary, Admiralty
- Alfred William Flux, Assistant Secretary, Board of Trade
- Henry Leon French OBE Assistant Secretary, Ministry of Agriculture
- Herman Cameron Norman CSI CBE British Minister, Teheran
- Allan Paton, in Charge of Establishment at Hotel Majestic during the whole of Peace Conference
- Henry Maunsel Richards, Chief Inspector of Elementary Schools, Board of Education
- Charles Strachey, Principal Clerk, Colonial Office
- Horace John Wilson CBE Principal Assistant Secretary, Ministry of Labour

=== The Most Exalted Order of the Star of India ===
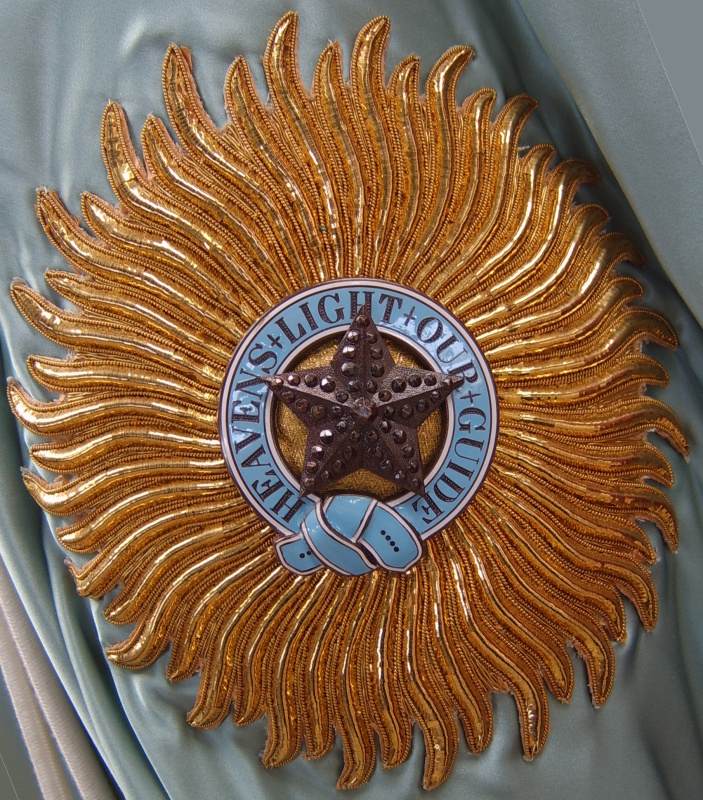
Star of a Knight Grand Commander of the Most Exalted Order of the Star of India

==== Knight Commander (KCSI) ====
- Sir George Stapylton Barnes KCB Ordinary Member of the Governor-General's Executive Council
- Colonel Nawab Muhammad Nasrulla Khan, Heir-apparent to the Bhopal State, Central India

==== Companion (CSI) ====
- William John Joseph Howley, Chief Engineer, Public Works Department, Madras
- John Loader Maffey CIE Indian Civil Service, Chairman of the Corporation of Calcutta, Bengal
- Charles Frederick Payne, Indian Civil Service, Chairman of the Corporation of Calcutta, Bengal
- Jean Louis Rieu, Indian Civil Service, Bombay
- Bertram Prior Standen CIE Indian Civil Service, Commissioner, Central Provinces and Berar

=== The Most Distinguished Order of Saint Michael and Saint George ===
Star of the Order of Saint Michael and Saint George.

==== Knight Grand Cross of the Order of St Michael and St George (GCMG) ====
- The Rt. Hon. Sir John Newell Jordan GCIE KCB KCMG lately His Majesty's Envoy Extraordinary and Minister Plenipotentiary to the Republic of China

==== Knight Commander of the Order of St Michael and St George (KCMG) ====
- Beilby Francis Alston CB His Majesty's Envoy Extraordinary and Minister Plenipotentiary to the Republic of China
- Geoffrey Francis Archer CMG Governor and Commander-in-Chief, Somaliland Protectorate
- The Hon. William Elliot Johnson, Speaker of the House of Representatives, Commonwealth of Australia
- The Hon. Sir Charles Gregory Wade Kt KC lately Agent-General for the State of New South Wales
- Denison Samuel King Miller, Governor of the Commonwealth Bank of Australia

Honorary Knight Commander

- His Highness Mohamed Jemalul Alam CMG Sultan of Brunei

==== Companion of the Order of St Michael and St George (CMG) ====
- James Richard Collins, Secretary to the Department of the Treasury, Commonwealth of Australia
- Crawford Douglas Douglas-Jones, Resident Commissioner in Southern and Northern Rhodesia
- Joseph Adolphe Duclos, Member of the Council of Government, Mauritius
- Walter Augustus Gale, Clerk of the House of Representatives, Commonwealth of Australia
- Edward Blackwell Jarvis, Chief Secretary to the Government, Uganda Protectorate
- James Comyn Macgregor, Resident Commissioner, Bechuanaland Protectorate
- Hugh Charlie Marshall, Visiting Commissioner, Northern Rhodesia
- Stephen Mills, Comptroller-General, Department of Trade and Customs, Commonwealth of Australia
- Colonel Gerald Henry Summers, Deputy Commissioner and Officer Commanding the Troops, Somaliland Protectorate
- Robert Gilbert Vansittart MVO Counsellor of Embassy in His Majesty's Diplomatic Service
- William Frank Arthur Rattigan, First Secretary in His Majesty's Diplomatic Service
- Commander Gerald Talbot RNVR OBE Naval Attaché to His Majesty's Legation at Athens

Honorary Companion

- Sheikh Ali bin Salim CBE Assistant Liwali of Mombasa

=== The Most Eminent Order of the Indian Empire ===
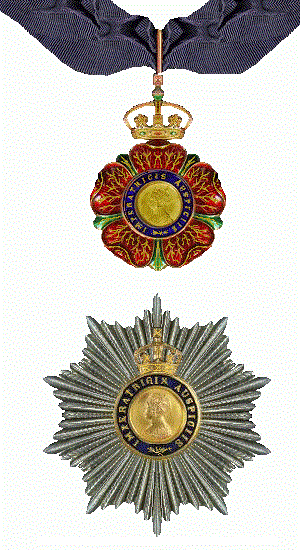
Riband, badge and star of the Knight Grand Commander of the Order of the Indian Empire

==== Knight Commander (KCIE) ====
- John Ghest Cumming CSI CIE Indian Civil Service, Member of the Executive Council, Bengal
- Capt. His Highness Nawab Taley Muhammad Khan Sher Muhammad Khan, Nawab of Palanpur, Bombay
- Herbert John Maynard CSI Indian Civil Service, Financial Commissioner, Punjab

==== Companion (CIE) ====
- Charles Turner Allen, Cooper, Allen & Co., Cawnpore, United Provinces
- Lieutenant-Colonel Chetwynd Rokeby Alfred Bond CBE late Indian Staff Corps
- Charles William Egerton Cotton, Indian Civil Service, Collector of Customs, Calcutta
- William Patrick Cowie, Indian Civil Service, Private Secretary to the Governor of Bombay
- Major Frederick Wernham Gerrard, Deputy Commissioner of Police, Basrah, Mesopotamia
- Khan Bahadur Muhammad Habibulla Sahib Bahadur, Ex-Member of the Executive Council of Madras
- Percy Harrison, Indian Civil Service, Junior Member, Board of Revenue, United Provinces
- Major Francis Henry Humphrys, Indian Army, Political Agent, Khyber, North-West Frontier Province
- Claud Mackenzie Hutchinson, Imperial Agricultural Bacteriologist
- Cowasji Jehangir, Junior OBE President, Bombay Municipality
- Charles Burdett La Touche, Manager, Jodhpur-Bikaner Railway, Rajputana
- Babu Akshoy Kumar Maitra, President and Founder of the Varendra Research Society in Rajshahi, Bengal
- Abdul Majid, Legal Remembrancer, Assam
- Sorabji Bezonji Mehta, Manager, Empress Mills, Nagpur
- Ralph Sneyd Pearson, Forest Economist, Research Institute, Dehra Dun
- Winter Charles Renouf, Indian Civil Service, Political Agent, Bahawalpur Agency, Punjab
- John Reid, Indian Civil Service, Reforms Officer, Bihar and Orissa
- Edward Cheke Smalley Shuttleworth, Commissioner of Police, Rangoon, Burma
- Khan Bahadur Raja Sifat Bahadur, Governor of Yasin, Gilgit Agency, Kashmir
- Lieutenant-Colonel Ralph Verney, Rifle Brigade, Military Secretary to His Excellency the Viceroy

=== The Royal Victorian Order ===
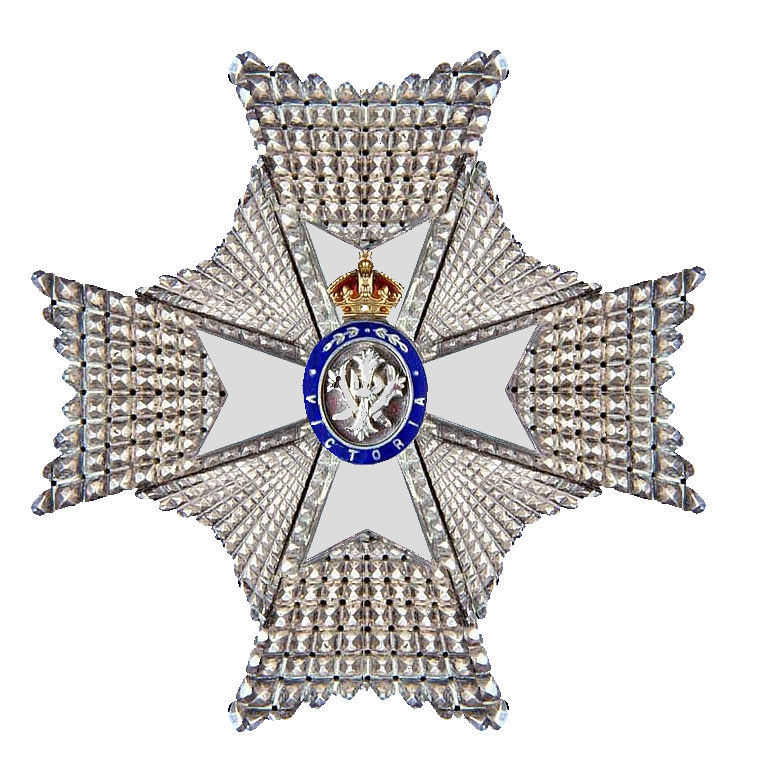
Insignia of a Knight / Dames Commander of the Royal Victorian Order

==== Knight Grand Cross of the Royal Victorian Order (GCVO) ====
- Arthur Henry John, Baron Ormathwaite KCVO
- Colonel the Honorary Sir Henry Charles Legge KCVO

==== Commander of the Royal Victorian Order (CVO) ====
- Rowland Thomas, Earl of Cromer MVO (Dated 1 April 1920.)
- Colonel the Hon. George Arthur Charles Crichton MVO
- Sir Francis Henry Dent (Dated 31 March 1920.)
- Percy Armytage MVO
- Lieutenant-Colonel John Mackenzie-Rogan MVO (Dated 30 March 1920)

==== Member of the Royal Victorian Order, 4th class (MVO) ====
- Major George Gooding

=== The Most Excellent Order of the British Empire ===
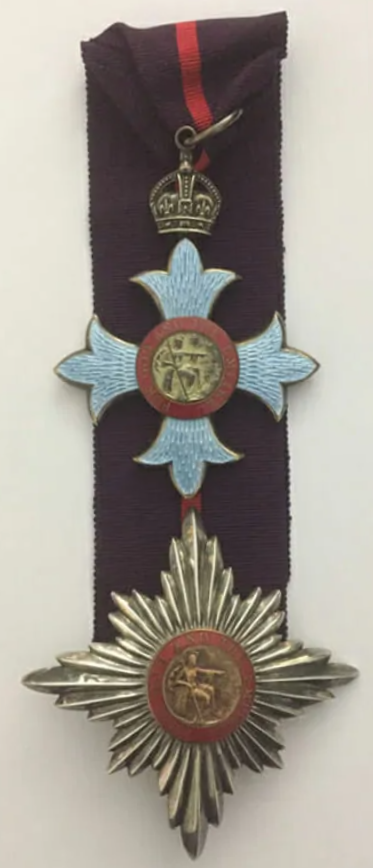
Knight Commander of the Order of the British Empire, insignia 1917–35

==== Knight Grand Cross of the Order of the British Empire (GBE) ====
===== Civil Division =====
- Sir Percy Elly Bates Bt Voluntary services to the Ministry of Shipping for five years
- Sir John Lorne MacLeod DL Lord Provost of Edinburgh throughout the War
- Lieutenant-Colonel Sir Thomas Bilbe Robinson KCMG KBE Agent-General for Queensland until end of 1919. For services to Board of Trade in connection with purchase and distribution of frozen meat for Allied Forces

Diplomatic Service and Overseas List

==== Dame Commander of the Order of the British Empire (DBE) ====
- Violet Florence Mabel, Lady Mond. Services in connection with her hospital at Melchet
- Ethel Maud, Lady Pearson. Services in connection with St. Dunstan's Hostel for the Blind

==== Knight Commander of the Order of the British Empire (KBE) ====
===== Civil Division =====
- John Apsey CBE Royal Corps of Naval Constructors. Manager of Constructive Department at Portsmouth for past twelve years
- Frederick William Bowater. For Services rendered to Ministry of Information
- Howard D'Egville CBE Secretary to Empire Parliamentary Association
- James Duncan Elliot, Engineer Adviser to New Zealand Dominion Government Member of Industrial Court
- The Hon. William Finlay KC Chairman of Contraband Committee; Legal Adviser to Foreign Office during Peace Conference
- James Dundas-Grant FRCS Eminent aural specialist
- Lieutenant-Colonel Henry Mulleneux Grayson CBE MP RM Director of Ship Repairs, Ministry of Shipping
- Ernest Musgrave Harvey CBE Chief Cashier, Bank of England
- Vesey George Mackenzie Holt DL Senior Partner of Messrs. Holt & Co., Bankers
- Arnold Lawson FRCS For voluntary medical and surgical work at St. Dunstan's Hostel for the Blind
- William Henry Peat, Financial Secretary to Ministry of Food, 1917–1920
- Philip Bridger Proctor Director of Meat Supplies, Ministry of Food
- Josiah Charles Stamp CBE For valuable services rendered to the Government in connection with financial and economic problems
- Colonel William Taylor CB Ex-President of Royal College of Surgeons in Ireland
- Alexander Walker. For services rendered to Ministry of Munitions in the disposal of surplus war material
- Temp. Brigadier-General Arthur John Allen-Williams, For Machine Gun Work in connection with military transport at the Port of Richborough

==== Commanders of the Order of the British Empire (CBE) ====
None.

==== Officers of the Order of the British Empire (OBE) ====
===== Civil Division =====
- Charles Crump Divisional Locomotive Superintendent, London, Great Western Railways

==== Members of the Order of the British Empire (MBE) ====
None.

=== Kaisar-i-Hind Medal ===
First Class

- Diwan Bahadur Tirumalai Desika Achariyar Avargal, President of the Trinchopoly District Board, Madras
- Gopal Krishna Devdhar, Bombay
- Reverend Father Matthews, Head of the Belgian Mission High School, Dalwal, Jhelum District, Punjab
- The Reverend John McNeel, Missionary of the Church of Scotland, Seoul, Central Provinces
- Dhanjibhai Hormasji Mehta, Medical Officer, Patao Hospital, Baroda
- Olive Monahan, Madras
- Shamrao Ramrao Moolgavkar, Principal
- Medical Officer, Bikaner State, Rajputana
- Reverend Mother Sacramento Clara Plamondon, Sister in St. Joseph's Leper Asylum, Burma
- Ambalal Sarabhai, Ahmedabad, Bombay
- Millicent Vere Webb, Lady Superintendent, Dufferin Victoria Hospital, Calcutta, Bengal

=== King's Police Medal (KPM) ===
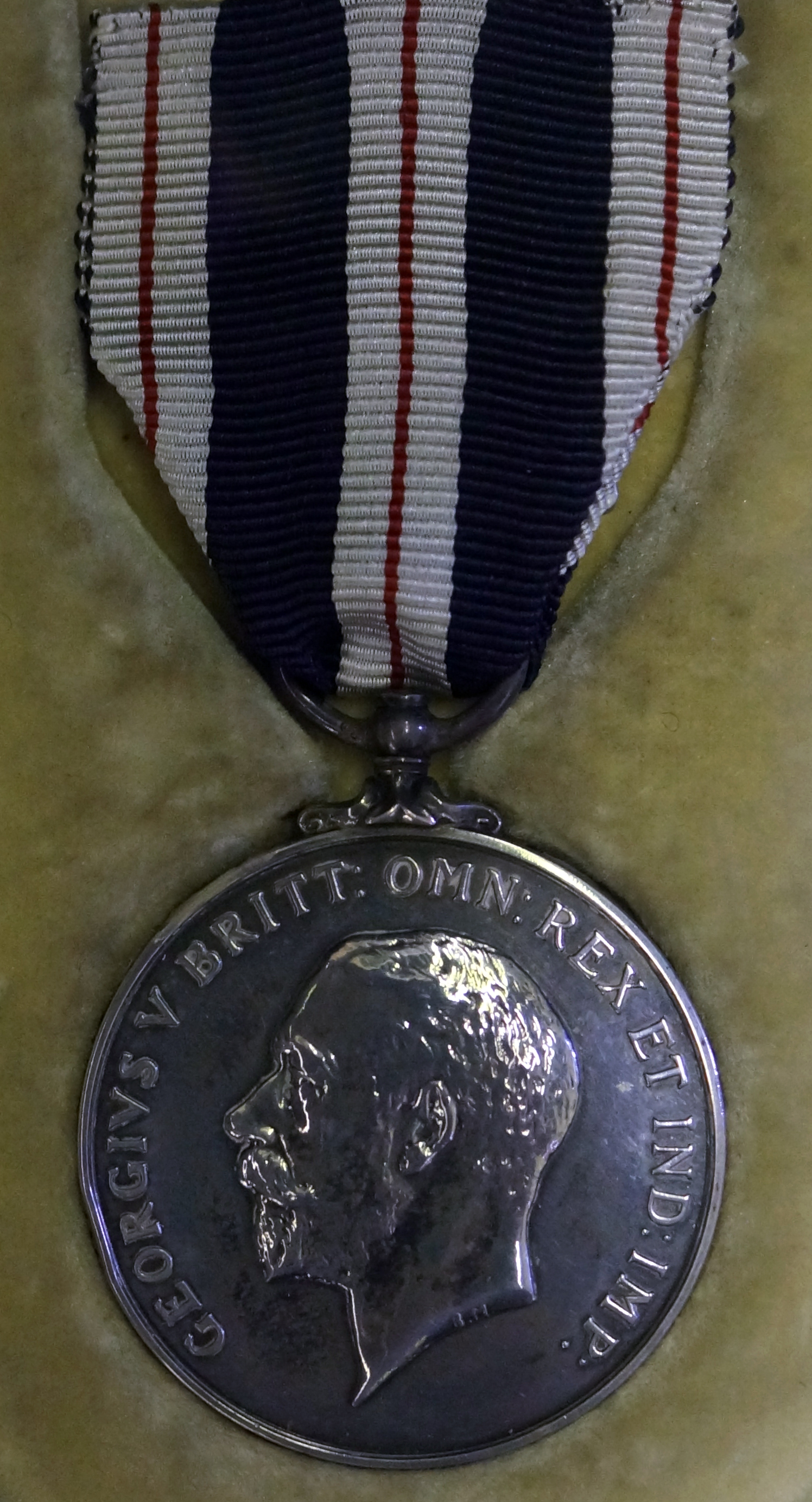
King's Police Medal with the riband for gallantry

British India

- Nurzali, Fourth Grade Inspector;
- Nur Mohammed, Third Grade Mounted Constable, both of the North-West Frontier Police;
- Mohammed Hasan, Constable;
- Lai Shahgul, Constable;
- Hari Singh, Head Constable; and
- Gul Mohammed, Mounted Head Constable, all of the Zhob and Loralai Police, on account of special services rendered on the North-West Frontier, in the Zhob Valley, and in Baluchistan during July and August, 1919, and January, 1920

=== Imperial Service Order (ISO) ===
Home Civil Service

- Richard Bullen Newton, Assistant in Department of Geology, British Museum
- Arthur Robert Dawson MBE Collector of Customs and Excise, Cardiff
- Frederick Pullen, Postmaster-Surveyor, Glasgow
- Charles Proctor, FIC Superintending Analyst, Department of the Government Chemist
- George Edward Ambrose, Chief Clerk, National Gallery
- William Ragle Clark FRSE Keeper of Natural History Department, Royal Scottish Museum, Scottish Education Department
- Robert Duncan, Staff Officer, Veterinary Branch, Department of Agriculture and Technical Instruction for Ireland

Overseas Dominions

- D'Arcy Wentworth Addison, Under Secretary for Tasmania
- Thomas Noel Brodrick OBE Under Secretary of the Lands and Survey Department, New Zealand
- Henry Carr, Resident of the Colony of Nigeria
- Edwin Tiptree Drake, Secretary for Public Works, Victoria
- Benjamin Harry Friend, Principal Parliamentary Reporter, Commonwealth of Australia
- Joseph Peascod Harper, Surveyor-General, Federated Malay States
- William James Mackay, Chief Collector of Customs, Cyprus
- Richard Horton O'Dwyer, Commissioner of Public Charities, Newfoundland
- Malcolm Lindsay Shepherd, Secretary, Prime Minister's Department, Commonwealth of Australia
- Percival Stevens, Inspector of Mines, Trinidad

Indian Civil Service

- Arthur Miller, Second Class Clerk, Higher Grade, in the India Office Library
- William Ernest Mitchell, Superintendent, Central Jail, Vellore, Madras
- M. R. Ry. Diwan Bahadur Pasupuleti Parankusam Nayudu, Deputy Commissioner of Police, Madras
- Ethelbert Edward Thomas, Superintendent, Central Jail, Nagpur, Central Provinces
- Raj Bahadur Pandit Brij Jiwan Lai, Extra Assistant Commissioner, Merwara, Ajmer-Merwara
- Lieutenant James William Fairley, Superintendent, Civil Commissioner's Office, Baghdad
- Raj Bahadur Prasanna Kumar Basu, Registrar, Reforms Office
- Joseph Lilly de Vine, Nagpur
- Raj Sahib Mahendra Nath Bhattacharji, Personal Assistant to the Surgeon to the Governor of Bengal
- Richard Arnold Matthews, Superintendent, Provincial Civil Secretariat, Punjab
- Khan Biahadur Ghulam Yasim Ghulam Mustapha, Director of the Pritchard Salt Works, Kharaghoda, Bombay

=== Imperial Service Medal (ISM) ===
British India

- Goodoo Miah Muhammad Ghouse, late Council Dubash, Chief Secretariat, Fort St. George, Madras
- Mohamed Jaffar Ghulam Dastagir, Chief Laboratory Attendant, Office of the Government Agricultural Chemist, Madras
- Egambaram Rangaswami Doss, late Chief Attendant, Medical College, Madras
- Narayan Ramji Katke, late Naik in the Office of the Executive Engineer, Foona District, Bombay
- Pampamiya Sayad Mir, late Chaukidar in the Ahmednagar District, Bombay
- Prayagdin, late Forest Guard, Central Provinces
