= Mitchelson =

Mitchelson may refer to:

- Archibald Mitchelson (1878–1945), British investment banker
- Bonnie Mitchelson (born 1947), politician in Manitoba, Canada
- Edwin Mitchelson (1846–1934), New Zealand politician and timber merchant
- Gareth Mitchelson (born 1967), Scottish dancer
- Joanne Mitchelson (born 1971), Tasmanian-born Artist
- Marvin Mitchelson (1928–2004), American celebrity lawyer, pioneer of palimony
- Richard Mitchelson Campbell (1897–1974), New Zealand economist, civil servant and diplomat

== See also ==
- Mitchell (disambiguation)
- Mitchelstown
