= John Robert Dewar =

New Zealand surveyor (1883–1964)

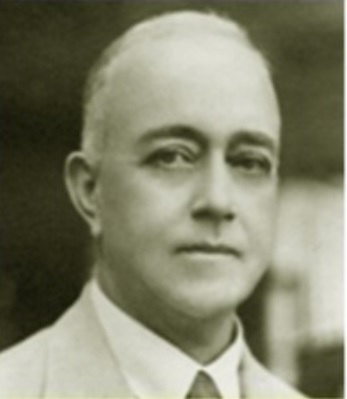

5th Surveyor General of Malaysia
- In office 5 June 1933 – 27 March 1938
- Preceded by: Victor Alexander Lowinger
- Succeeded by: William Francis Noel Bridges

Personal details
- Born: 10 December 1883 Alexandra, Otago, New Zealand
- Died: 12 April 1964 (aged 80) Bournemouth, England
- Spouse: Gladys Katherine née Plunkett
- Children: Richard John Gresley Dewar

John Robert Dewar CBE (10 December 1883 - 12 April 1964) was a New Zealand surveyor, who served as the fifth Surveyor General of Federated Malay States, between 1933 and 1938.

John Robert Dewar was born on 10 December 1883 in Alexandra, Otago, New Zealand, the son, and eldest of five children, of John Dewar (1834–1927), a Scottish miner who migrated to New Zealand, and Bethia née née Bringans (1859–1937). He studied at the New Zealand University, where he qualified as a land surveyor, working at the Lands and Survey Department at New Plymouth and Taranaki from 1901 until 1906. He then moved to Malaya in 1906 joining the Pahang Survey Department as 1st Grade Surveyor. He then transferred to Kedah in November 1911 as the Assistant Superintendent of Surveys.

On 19 July 1911 Dewar married Gladys Katherine Plunkett (1885–1972) at St John's Church, Hobart, Tasmania, and they had one son, Richard John Gresley Dewar (1916–1991), who served as the aide-de-camp to the Governor of Tanganyika, Sir William Denis Battershill, after the Second World War.

In January 1924 he took up an appointment as Acting Assistant Surveyor-General in Kuala Lumpur, where in 1930 he undertook a detailed review of the department, resulting in a complete restructuring of its operations. On 6 December 1931 was promoted to Deputy Surveyor-General. On 5 June 1933 he was appointed the Surveyor-General of the Federated Malaya States, a post he held until his retirement on 27 March 1938. Dewar was awarded a Commander of the British Empire in the 1938 New Year Honours, for his service in the Federated Malay States and Straits Settlements.

Dewar retired to Callander, Scotland. At the end of World War II the Colonial Office invited him to return to Malaya and undertake a review of the Survey Department, in particular their land titles area. Following which he returned to Callander before moving to Tasmania, and then to England, where he resided at Flat 3, Castle Mount, St. Valerie Road, Bournemouth until his death on 12 April 1964, at the age of 80.

== See also ==
- Surveyor General of Malaysia
