= Hugh Jackson =

Hugh Jackson may refer to:

- Hugh Jackson (golfer) (1940–2015), Irish golfer
- Hugh Jackson (paediatrician) (1918–2013), British pediatrician and child safety campaigner
- Hugh Milbourne Jackson (1858–1940), British military officer and surveyor
- Hugh Jackson (Texas politician), member of the Twentieth Texas Legislature
- Hugh Jackson (died 1779), older brother of American president Andrew Jackson, died during the Battle of Stono Ferry
- Hugh Jackson of the Jackson baronets

== See also ==
- Hue Jackson (born 1965), American football coach
- Hugh Jackman, actor
