= Henry French =

Henry French may refer to:

- Henry F. French (1813–1885), agriculturist, inventor, lawyer, judge, postmaster, assistant district attorney, assistant Secretary of the United States Treasury, and author
- Barney French (Henry Bernard French, 1922–2005), Australian politician, member of the New South Wales Legislative Council, 1973–1991
- Henry French (1812–1878), American steamboat builder; see Henry French House
- Henry French v. H C Taylor on List of United States Supreme Court cases, volume 199, decided 1905
- Sir Henry French (civil servant) (1883–1966), English civil servant

== See also ==
- Harry Livingston French (1871–1928), American architect
