= Sir John Anderson, 1st Baronet =

Sir John Anderson, 1st Baronet, may refer to:

- Sir John Anderson, 1st Baronet, of Mill Hill (c. 1736–1813), British politician, MP for the City of London, 1793–1806
- Sir John Anderson, 1st Baronet, of Harrold Priory (1878–1963), Scottish businessman, writer and lecturer

== See also ==
- John Anderson (disambiguation)
