= Alfred George Billing =

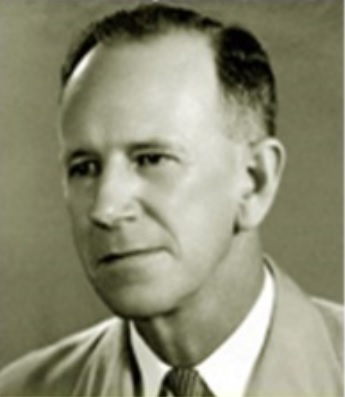

8th Surveyor General of Malaysia
- In office 7 October 1949 – 2 September 1952
- Preceded by: Percy Herbert Bonnet
- Succeeded by: Christopher Noble

Personal details
- Born: 12 August 1902 Indooroopilly, Queensland
- Died: 13 March 1989 (aged 86) Brisbane, Australia
- Citizenship: Australian
- Spouse: Meta Livian Everdell

Alfred George Billing (12 August 1903 – 13 March 1989) was an Australian surveyor who served as the eighth Surveyor-General of the Federated Malay States, from 1949 to 1952.

Albert George Billing was born 12 August 1902 in Indooroopilly, Queensland, the third son and fifth of six children of George Bienvenu Billing (1864-1929) and Alice Isabel Mary née Ottaway (1871-1939).

He attended Brisbane Grammar School. In February 1918 he successfully passed the Commonwealth Public Service examination, and worked in the Queensland Survey Department until 1923. In March 1924 he took up a position with the Federated Malay States Survey Department in Johore and in March 1928 was made an assistant superintendent. In September 1928 has appointed as acting deputy chief surveyor for Singapore.

On 27 May 1933 he married Meta Livian Everdell (1902-1976), and on 28 November 1935 they had twins, a son and a daughter. In October 1940 he was appointed as chief surveyor for Selangor and Negeri Sembilan.

On 7 October 1949 he was appointed Surveyor-General of the Federated Malay States, replacing Percy Herbert Bonnet. He retired from the position on 2 September 1952. Billing was subsequently appointed as the liaison officer for Malay students studying at Australian universities.

He died on 13 March 1989 in Brisbane, at the age of 86.
