= Arnold Lessel MacMorland Greig =

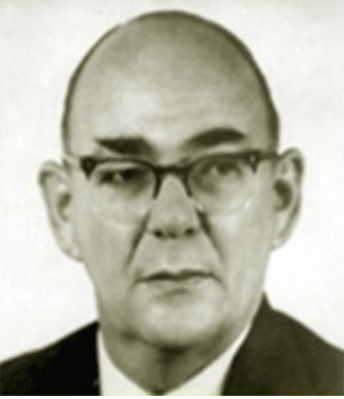

11th Surveyor General of Malaysia
- In office 2 April 1960 – 3 February 1963
- Preceded by: Luis Sigismund Himley
- Succeeded by: Tan Shri Haji Mohd Yatim Bin Yahya

Personal details
- Born: 24 February 1913 Amatikulu, South Africa
- Died: July 1984 (aged 71) Auckland, New Zealand
- Citizenship: British
- Spouse: Nona Jocelyn Blampied
- Children: four

Lieutenant Arnold Lessel MacMorland Greig CBE ED (24 February 1913 – July 1984) was a New Zealand surveyor who served as the eleventh Surveyor-General of the Federated Malay States, from 1960 to 1963.

Arnold Lessel MacMorland Greig was born on 24 February 1913 in Amatikulu, South Africa, the oldest of two children to MacMorland Greig (1893-?) and Susan Robina 'Ruby' née Henderson (1987-1970). Three months after he was born his mother, originally from Dunedin, Otago, moved her family back to New Zealand, settling in Auckland. Greig received his primary and secondary education at Dilworth School and Auckland Grammar School. He attended the School of Engineering at the Auckland University College, joining the surveying firm of Harrison and Greirson, where he trained as a surveyor, qualifying as a registered surveyor in 1935.

Greig was appointed to the Malayan Survey Department on 11 September 1937. In 1940, he was sent to India on a six month course in aerial surveying, upon his return to Malaya in September 1941, he joined the newly established Field Survey Company as a first lieutenant in the Straits Settlements Volunteer Force. He was captured during the Fall of Singapore and was imprisoned for six months in Changi Japanese prisoner-of-war camp, between February and August 1942, before he was transferred as a prisoner of war to the Mukden prisoner-of-war camp in Manchuria, from November 1942 to August 1945, where he worked in a local machine tool factory. He was repatriated and embarked on the hospital ship USS Relief (August - September 1945).

In 1946 he married Nona Jocelyn Blampied (1918-1987).

From 1946 to 1958 he was employed at various times with the Survey Departments of Kedah, Kelantan, Malacca, Perak and Singapore. Greig was appointed Deputy Surveyor-General in 1958 and was promoted to Surveyor-General for the Federation of Malaya on 2 April 1960, retiring from the position on 3 February 1963.

In the 1963 Birthday Honours he was appointed a Commander of the Order of the British Empire for his services as Surveyor-General of Malaysia.

Upon retirement Greig returned to New Zealand and in 1966 he took up a position as a senior lecturer in the Engineering Department at the University of Auckland.

== See also ==
- Surveyor General of Malaysia
