= Charles Goodyear (disambiguation) =

Charles Goodyear (1800–1860) was an American self-taught chemist and manufacturing engineer.

Charles Goodyear may also refer to:

- Charles Goodyear (politician) (1804–1876), United States representative from New York
- Charles W. Goodyear (1846–1911), attorney and president of the Great Southern Lumber Company
- Charles Moncrieff Goodyear (1867–1923), British surveyor
- Chip Goodyear (born 1958), former CEO of BHP Billiton Limited
