= Joseph Peascod Harper =

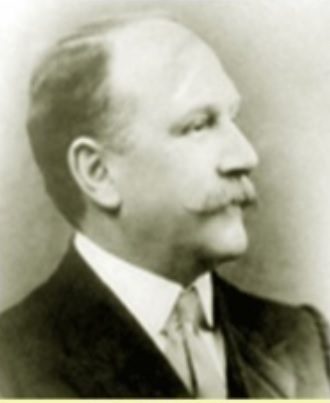

2nd Surveyor General of Malaysia
- In office 8 March 1919 – 30 June 1920
- Preceded by: Hugh Milbourne Jackson
- Succeeded by: Charles Moncrieff Goodyear

Personal details
- Born: March 1861 Carlisle, Cumberland, England
- Died: 4 April 1951 (aged 90) Somerset, England
- Citizenship: British
- Spouse: Gertrude Jane née Dishman
- Children: Graeme, Ena Gertrude (b.1896)

Joseph Peascod Harper ISO (March 1861 – 4 April 1951) was a British land surveyor, who served as the second Surveyor-General of the Federated Malay States (1919-1920).

Joseph Peascod Harper was born in March 1861 in Carlisle, Cumberland, the son of James Harper (1836-1877) and Jane C. He attended Birkbeck College, London. He was apprenticed to the Survey Department and subsequently engaged as a surveyor in the Department's London office. In 1889 the Colonial Office appointed Harper as a surveyor (1st grade) in Larut.

He became a Revenue Surveyor in 1894, and the Superintendent of Revenue Surveys for Perak in 1898. Harper was a Fellow of the Royal Geographical Society and the Royal Colonial Institute. He was a Past Master of the Taiping Lodge of Freemasons. Harper was an accomplished marksman and between 1905 and 1906 was the president of the Perak Rifle Association, in 1905 and 1906 he also won the Governor's Cup, and secured several other shooting trophies. On 1 August 1911 he was appointed as Deputy Surveyor General of the Federated Malay States.

He married Gertrude Jane Dishman (1873-1951), the second daughter of John Dishman, Government Printer of Perak, they had a son and a daughter.

On 8 March 1919 he was appointed the Surveyor-General of the Federated Malay States, replacing Col. Hugh Milbourne Jackson. Harper having previously been acting in that position whilst Jackson was absent on active service. He retired on 30 June 1920 and was replaced by Charles Moncrieff Goodyear.

Harper was granted the Imperial Service Order in the 1920 Birthday Honours for his service as Surveyor-General for the Federated Malay States.

After he retired he returned to England, where he died in Somerset on 4 April 1951, at the age of 90.

== See also ==
- Surveyor General of Malaysia
