= William Noble (BBC founder) =

BBC founder, chief engineer, GPO (1861-1943)

Sir William Noble
- Born: 22 April 1861; Fraserburgh
- Died: 10 November 1943 (aged 82); London
- Spouse: Ethel Elsie Jane Strachan (m. 1935)

Sir William Noble (22 April 1861 – 10 November 1943), was a chief engineer of the Post Office, and a founder of the BBC.

== Background ==
Noble was born in a house on Back Street, now High Street, Fraserburgh, the son of Alexander Begg Noble, master blacksmith and Elizabeth Brook.

== Early career and study ==
It is reported that Noble left school at 13. He started work as a telegraphist in Aberdeen aged 16. He studied Pitman's shorthand, and in his spare time studied English, mathematics and the principles of electricity and magnetism. He gained several medals and prizes, and was employed for a time as lecturer in electricity and telegraphy at Gordon's College, Aberdeen. His skill with shorthand led to an invitation to become a journalist, which he turned down.

By 1893 he was appointed engineer-in-charge at the Aberdeen section of the Post Office. In 1901 he moved to London and played a leading role in the development of the telephone network in the capital. He became superintending engineer for the London District in 1907. In 1912 he was appointed assistant engineer-in-chief of the Post Office. By 1919 he had reached the top position of the Post Office's engineer-in-chief, replacing Sir William Slingo. War had interrupted the development of the civilian telephone network. He had been responsible for the selection of suitable officers for the Signals Section of the Royal Engineers.

He appeared before both the Holt Committee and the Geddes Committee, and his evidence for the value of the work carried out by Engineering Department of the Post Office resulted in that department largely avoiding cuts.

Noble had been responsible for plans for extending the London Post Office Railway, expansion of which has been delayed by the recent war.

He retired from the Post Office in 1922, having been appointed the chairman of the newly formed Broadcasting Committee. He considered standing as a Liberal Party candidate in an upcoming election, but decided not to.

== Later career ==
Noble became director of the General Electric Company on his retirement. He co-founded the British Broadcasting Company, of which he was director from 1922 to 1926.

In October 1922 the board of the British Broadcasting Company placed an advert in the Times for a general manager and other positions. It read "The British Broadcasting Company (in formation). Applications are invited for the following officers: General Manager, Director of Programmes, Chief Engineer, Secretary. Only applicants having first-class qualifications need apply to Sir William Noble, Chairman of the Broadcasting Committee, Magnet House, Kingsway, WC2."

There were six applications for the post of general manager; among them one was from John Reith. Despite Reith's not knowing what 'broadcasting' was, he penned an application and posted it in his club's post-box. He then read about Noble in Who's Who, discovering his strong links to Aberdeen. He persuaded staff to open the post box, retrieved the application and reworked it with references to his roots in North East Scotland. Noble interviewed Reith and he was appointed later that year.

== Personal life and death ==
Noble was married three times. He was widowed twice. His second wife died on 20 June 1926. His third wife, who he married on 17 April 1935, at Saint Columba's (Church of Scotland), Chelsea, was Ethel Elsie Jane Strachan. She was 41 and he 73.

It was reported that Noble died in a London hotel on 10 November 1943 after a long illness. A memorial service was held at St Martins In the Fields on 17 November 1943, with a large congregation in attendance.

== Honours ==
Noble was knighted in the 1920 Birthday honours list. He was awarded the Chevalier de I'Ordre de la Couronne by the King of Belgium following the First World War. It was reported in his obituary in the Coventry Standard that "During his tenure office as Engineer-in-Chief, he had done much to assist the technical work of the Post Office In France and in Japan. On his retirement from the Post Office, the French Government wished confer on Sir William the order of the Legion d’Honneur. and the Japanese Government the Order of The Rising Sun; but the British Government declined allow this to be done, the ground that Sir William was Government official."
