= George Sleight =

Sir George Sleight Bt
- Born: George Frederick Sleight; 26 March 1853; Grimsby, Lincolnshire, England
- Died: 19 March 1921 (aged 67)
- Occupation: Fishing trawler owner

Sir George Frederick Sleight, 1st Baronet (26 March 1853 – 19 March 1921) was an English fishing trawler owner.

Sleight started his career as a cockle-gatherer on the seashore at Grimsby. He then went on to build a fishing empire that boasted the largest fleet of trawling smacks in the world. He was later a pioneer of steam trawlers and also acquired the largest fleet of those in the world. During the First World War almost all his vessels (50–60 of them) were commandeered for mine sweeping and patrol duties and more than thirty were sunk.

Having previously been knighted in the 1918 New Year Honours, Sleight was created a baronet in the 1920 Birthday Honours.

He died aged 68 and was succeeded in the baronetcy by his son, Ernest.

== Footnotes ==
Baronetage of the United Kingdom
New creation	Baronet (of Weelsby Hall); 1920–1921	Succeeded by Ernest Sleight
