= Henry Wickham (explorer) =

British botanist and smuggler (1846–1928)

Sir Henry Wickham
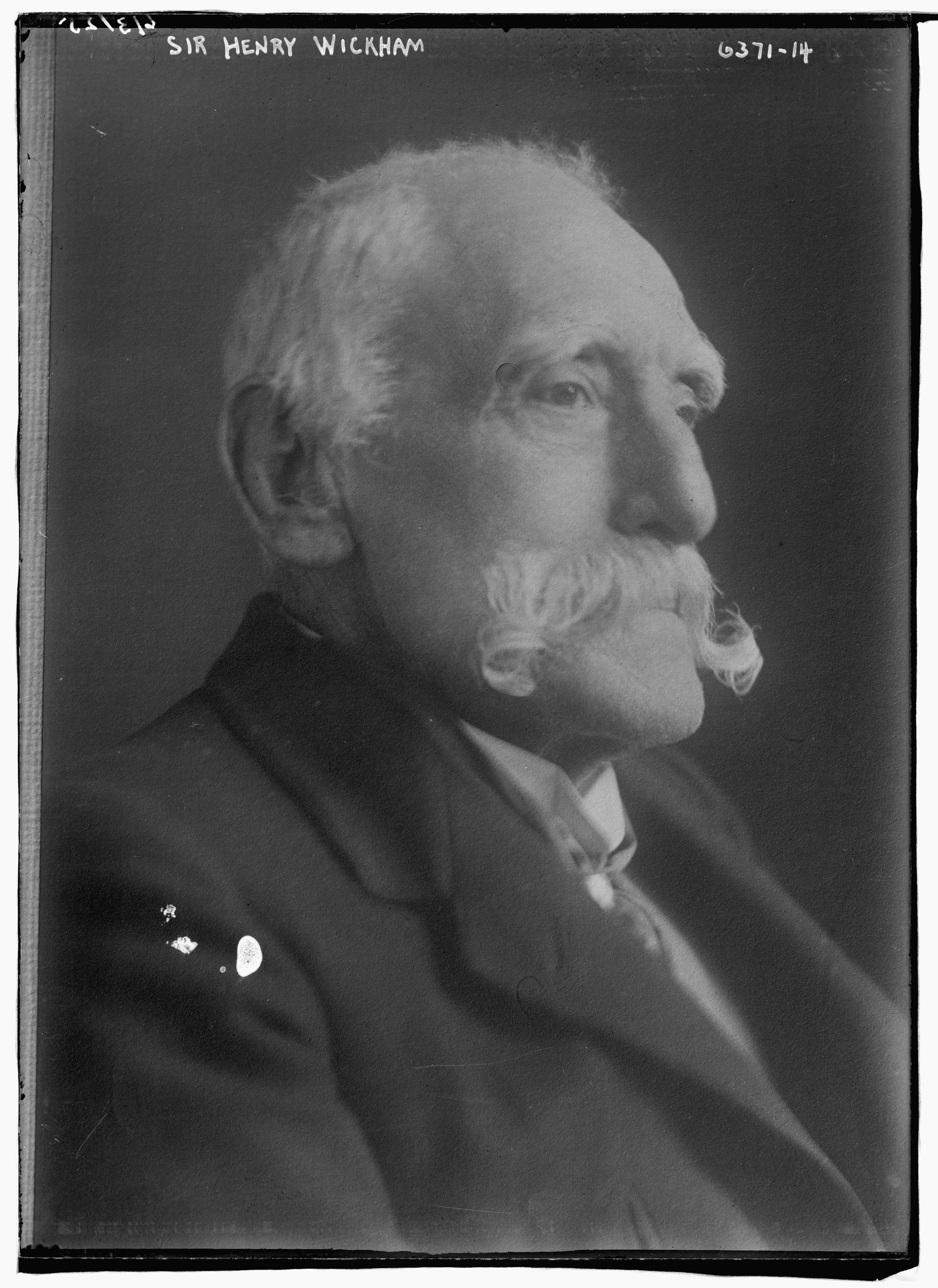
- Born: Henry Alexander Wickham; 29 May 1846; Hampstead, London, England
- Died: 27 September 1928 (aged 82); Paddington, London, England
- Occupation: Explorer
- Spouse: Violet Case Carter

Sir Henry Alexander Wickham (29 May 1846 – 27 September 1928) was a British explorer. He was the first person to smuggle a large, viable shipment of Brazilian rubber seeds to the British Empire. The British had long planned to create rubber plantations in Southeast Asia, and the plantations resulting from the seeds Wickham smuggled out of Brazil expanded the rubber industry and broke Brazil’s monopoly, bringing about the end of the Amazon rubber boom.

== Life ==
Henry Wickham was born in Hampstead, north London. Wickham's father, a solicitor, died when young Wickham was only four years old. At age 20 he traveled to Nicaragua, the first of several trips to Latin and South America. Returning to England, he married Violet Carter in 1871, whose father would publish Wickham's writings. His first book Rough Notes of a Journey Through The Wilderness from Trinidad to Pará, Brazil, by way of the Great Cateracts of the Orinoco, Atabapo, and Rio Negro, was published by W.H.J. Carter in 1872. He would take the entire family to Santarém, Brazil, where his mother, sister Harriette, and the mother-in-law to his brother, John, would all die by 1876. Wickham was knighted in the 1920 Birthday Honours "for services in connection with the rubber plantation industry in the Far East."

== Smuggling of rubber seeds ==
Wickham took about a year to collect rubber seeds from commercial rubber groves in Brazil after having been commissioned due to his presence in Brazil. Historian Warren Dean notes that it would have been odd for a British expat to collect so many seeds in broad daylight using local labour without local authorities having been aware of it. In fact, he had the permission of the rubber grove operators where he sourced his seeds. He falsely declared 70,000 seeds as "academic specimens", a term the Brazilians frequently used to classify dead animals or plants, not viable seeds. They arrived in London's Kew Gardens on June 15, 1876. Within a few weeks, only 2,700 of the 70,000 smuggled seeds had successfully germinated. They were sufficient to jump-start widespread cultivation in Southeast Asia.

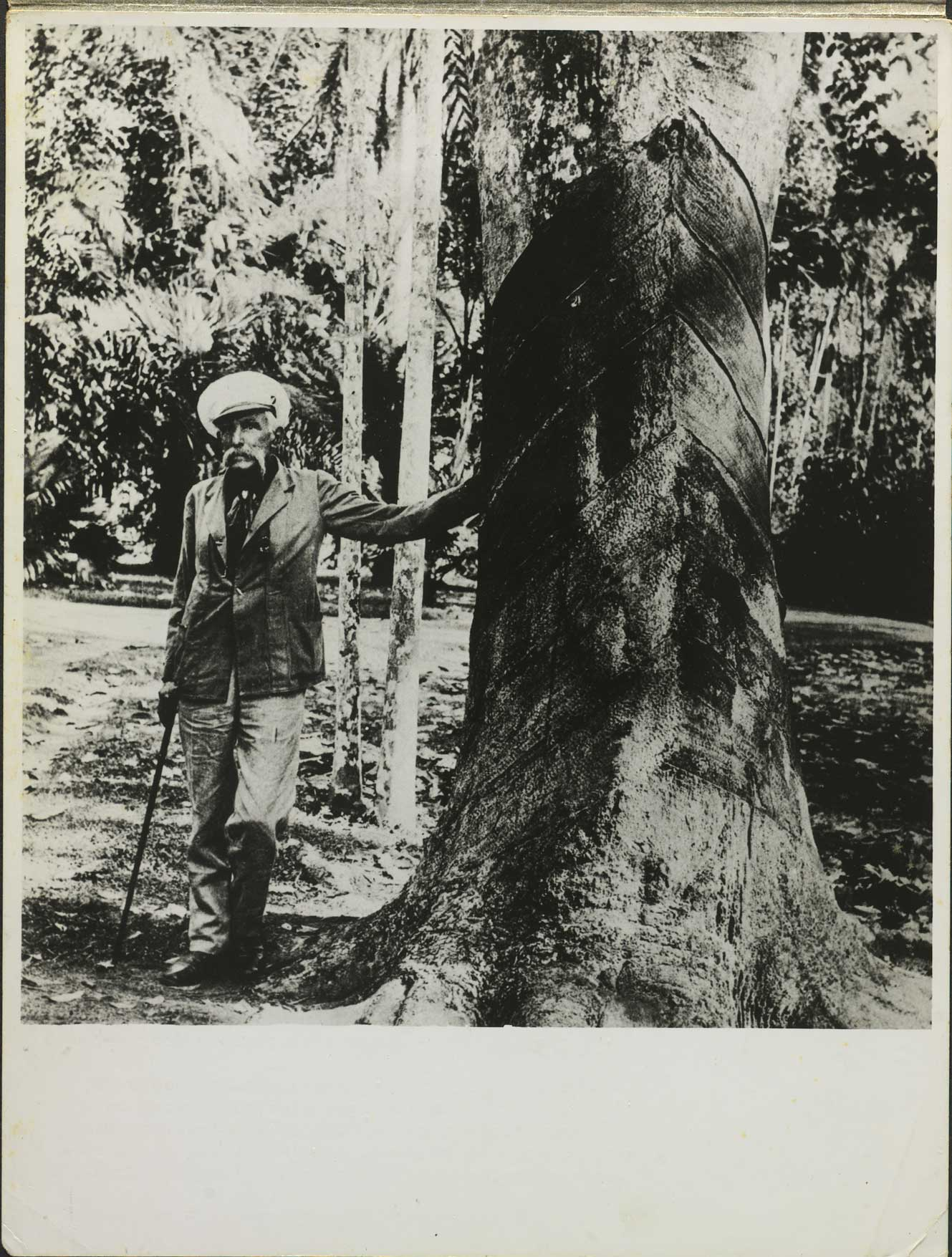
“Henry Wickham, who in 1876 directed an operation smuggling 70,000 rubber tree seeds”

Thirty years after the fact, Wickham claimed in 1908 that he was responsible for stealing about 70,000 seeds from the rubber-bearing tree, Hevea brasiliensis, in the Santarém area of Brazil in 1876. At the time, there was no law forbidding the export of seeds, although there was a requirement for an export licence, which Wickham obtained under false pretenses in Belém. From the embellishments—such as having to hide from pursuing gunboats—added to his original account it appears that Wickham was trying to make his actions more exciting than they were in fact.

The Ayapua Boat Museum (Museo Barco Historicos) in Iquitos, Peru calls his actions "the greatest act of biopiracy in the 19th century, and maybe in history", citing that the seeds were never properly recorded on the ship's manifest and that the resulting plantations in Asia deflated the rubber boom in South America. The museum also claims that he was specifically paid by the Royal Botanic Gardens, Kew to collect the seeds.

He accompanied the seeds to the Royal Botanic Gardens, from where seedlings were dispatched to British Ceylon (now Sri Lanka), British Malaya (now Peninsular Malaysia) and Singapore (though the latter was not used for rubber), Africa, Batavia in Dutch East Indies (now Jakarta in Indonesia), and other tropical destinations, thus dooming the Amazon rubber boom.

=== Economic impact ===
Rubber plantations in Asia proved to be more efficient and outproduced those in Brazil and Peru. This was because the Asian rubber plantations were organized and well-suited for production on a commercial scale, whereas in Brazil and Peru the process of latex gathering from forest trees remained a difficult extractive process: rubber tappers worked natural rubber groves in the southern Amazon forest, and rubber tree densities were almost always low as a consequence of high natural forest diversity. Experiments in cultivating rubber trees in plantations in the Amazon showed them to be vulnerable to South American rubber tree leaf blight fungus (Pseudocercospora ulei) and other diseases and pests—essentially limiting South American rubber production to hunting-gathering rather than agriculture.

In spite of decades of research in selecting highly productive and disease resistant rubber trees, many commercial rubber trees throughout the world are descended from the seeds Wickham took to Joseph Dalton Hooker in London.

In Brazil, Wickham is labeled as a "bio-pirate" for his role in smuggling the rubber seeds that broke the South American monopoly.
