= Christopher Noble =

English surveyor

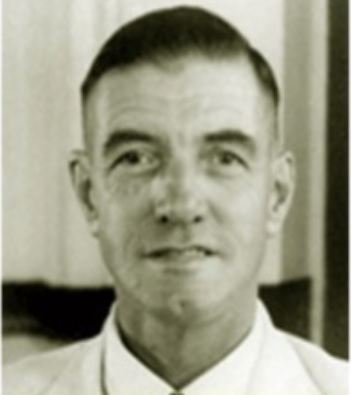

9th Surveyor General of Malaysia
- In office 26 January 1953 – 25 March 1956
- Preceded by: Alfred George Billing
- Succeeded by: Luis Sigismund Himley

Personal details
- Born: 18 August 1902 Middlesbrough, Yorkshire, England
- Died: 20 July 1982 (aged 79) Little Common, Bexhill-on-Sea, East Sussex
- Spouse: Barbara Constance Watherstone
- Occupation: Surveyor

Christopher Noble (18 August 1902 – 20 July 1986) was an English surveyor who served as the ninth Surveyor-General of the Federated Malay States from 1953 to 1956.

== Early life and education ==
Christopher Noble was born on 18 August 1902 in Middlesbrough, Yorkshire, England, the oldest of two children to William Hobkirk Noble (Chief Lithographer - Survey Department, Kuala Lumpur) and Jane Annie née Ward.

He attended Hanson Grammar School, Bradford, West Yorkshire before travelling to Australia, where he qualified as a licensed land surveyor at the University of Western Australia in March 1925.

== Professional career ==
On 18 April 1925 he was appointed as a surveyor in the Singapore Survey Department and on 30 April 1934 was promoted to senior surveyor. Until 1930 he worked mainly with the Toposurvey Branch, in Pahang, before working with the Survey Department in Kuala Lumpur, serving as the acting Assistant Surveyor-General between February 1940 and June 1941.

On 13 July 1942 he enlisted in Melbourne in the Royal Australian Air Force and served as a flying officer. He was honourably discharged on 24 June 1944 and returned to Malaya.

Noble was appointed as deputy Surveyor-General of the Federated Malay Straits in August 1949, and then Surveyor-General on 26 January 1953. He retired on 25 March 1956 and was succeeded by Luis Sigismund Himley. Upon his retirement he returned to England, where he died 20 July 1982 in Little Common, Bexhill-on-Sea, East Sussex, at the age of 79.

== Personal life ==
Noble married Barbara Constance Watherstone (1908-2001), the daughter of Charles Watherstone (Assistant Under-Secretary of State and Director of Finance at the War Office) and Constance Eva née Clarke, on 3 November 1934 at St Mary's Church, Harrow on the Hill in northwest London. Noble's sister, Maude (1912-2003), was married to Watherstone's brother, David Charles, who served as the Chief Secretary, Federation of Malaya and was knighted for his service in 1956.

== See also ==
- Surveyor General of Malaysia
