= Sir Ernest Glover, 1st Baronet =

English shipowner and public servant (1864–1934)

Sir Ernest Glover Bt
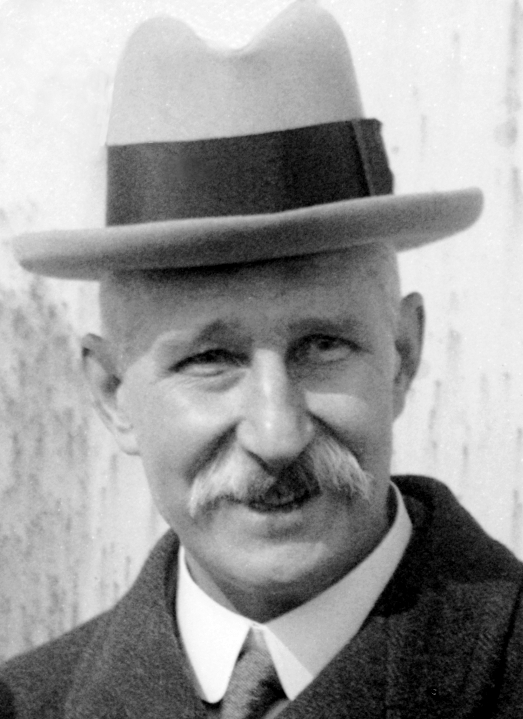
- Born: Ernest William Glover; 27 August 1864; County Durham, England
- Died: 21 January 1934 (aged 69)
- Occupations: Shipowner, public servant

Sir Ernest William Glover, 1st Baronet (27 August 1864 – 21 January 1934) was an English shipowner and public servant.

== Biography ==
Glover was born in County Durham to Septimus Jonathan Glover and his wife Elizabeth Ann, the daughter of Edwin Briggs of South Shields, Durham. He was educated in Germany and at University College School, London and became a partner in the family firm, Glover Brothers, a London shipowners (Shakespear Shipping Company) and ship and insurance brokers.

He married Helen Harrower Reynoldson, daughter of J. P. Reynoldson of South Shields, in South Shields in 1889.

During the First World War he joined the Ministry of Shipping as Director of the Ship Management Branch. For this service he was knighted in 1918 and was created a baronet of Arkley in the parish of Barnet in the County of Hertford in the 1920 Birthday Honours.

He was active in the Chamber of Shipping (serving as its president in 1923) and was chairman of the Baltic Mercantile and Shipping Exchange from 1924 to 1928.

He was also created Officier de l'Ordre de la Couronne, Belgium and Knight of the First Class of the Order of St Olav, Norway.

Glover and his wife had no children, and so the baronetcy became extinct upon his death.

== Footnotes ==
Baronetage of the United Kingdom
New creation	Baronet (of Arkley); 1920–1934	Extinct
