= William Henry Veno =

British pharmaceutical inventor

Sir William Henry Veno (1866–1933) was a British pharmaceutical inventor: creating both Veno's Cough Mixture and Germolene.

With a product lifespan of 120 years, Veno's is one of Britain's longest running brand names

== Life ==
He was born William Reynard Varney in the parish of Kelton near Castle Douglas in south-west Scotland on 22 December 1866, the son of William Varney and his wife Grace Susan Paterson. In the 1881 census they are living in Sorbie in Wigtownshire where his father was a gamekeeper. William is listed as a junior telegram operator. In 1884 he was employed as a cabin boy (possibly also with telegram duties) on a ship belonging to the Guion Line.

When the ship reached America he decided to stay in the USA (this seems to have been unofficial). In 1887 he discovered a recipe for cough mixture. This seems to have been from a Mr Veno. The continued use of the name Veno seems to have been a legal obligation (or was possibly trying to pass off as the original Mr Veno).

He went to London in 1889 and developed an interest in politics. In 1891 he returned to America and worked in advertising before going to Pittsburgh where he patented Veno's Cough Cure on 24 August 1894. The patent was made under his real name, but he used the surname Veno from this point onward.

He returned to Britain in the summer of 1897 and continued to adopt the surname Veno. He built a factory at 418 Chester Road in the Old Trafford district of Manchester and founded the Veno Drug Company in Manchester in 1898 (the factory was illustrated on the bottles). It sold "Veno's Lightning Cough Cure". Only in 1910 did he officially change his name in Britain to Veno (by deed poll).

In the First World War he worked on recruitment and seems to have been involved with the "Manchester-Scottish" battalion: the 15th Battalion Royal Scots. After the war he set up the Leigh branch of the British Legion. He also owned a theatre in Manchester.

He was Mayor of Altrincham for 1923/24. He was also a prominent Freemason in London.

He was knighted by King George V in the 1920 Birthday Honours. He applied for and received a coat-of-arms from the Lord Lyon.

In 1925 he sold his company to Beecham's Estates and Pills Ltd (via Philip Hill) for £500,000 (£30 million in 2020). Some of his profit was reinvested in photographic film companies but with little success.

He was found dead, on his estate at Woodlands, Bonville Road, Dunham Massey in Cheshire on 10 March 1933. He had gone out to shoot rabbits but had shot himself in the chest with his shotgun. A later inquest concluded "suicide due to temporary insanity".

He is buried in Bowden and Hale Cemetery in Altrincham near Manchester. In his will he left £181,000, around a third of his 1925 worth.

== Veno name ==
The use of the name "Veno" is very mysterious.

William himself seems to have implied that he "bought" the recipe for the cough mixture from a man in the USA called "Veno" (probably William Henry Veno). He then seems to at least partly if not fully, assume that man's identity. The obligation to do this appears linked to the product, and possibly some original agreement with the man. The most curious moment is therefore the day of registering his US patent: where he registered it in his true name but called the product "Veno's Cough Mixture". This was possibly to avoid a future legal challenge. One way or another, his adoption of the man's name is very strange. His later behaviour, especially his suicide, imply a hidden guilt not compensated by his wealth. A second theory is that there was no man "Veno" and Varney was echoing the name of Eno's Liver Salts which is certainly phonetically similar.

== Family ==
He married Mary Pearson (1878–1962) around 1910. They had two sons.
