= Sharp baronets =

Baronetcy in the Baronetage of the United Kingdom

There have been three baronetcies created for persons with the surname Sharp, one in the Baronetage of Nova Scotia and two in the Baronetage of the United Kingdom.

The Sharp Baronetcy, of Scotscraig in the County of Fife, was created in the Baronetage of Nova Scotia on 21 April 1683. For more information on this creation, see Bethune baronets.

The Sharp Baronetcy, of Heckmondwike in the West Riding of the County of York, was created in the Baronetage of the United Kingdom on 28 June 1920 for Milton Sharp. He was Chairman of the Bradford Dyers' Association Ltd.

The Sharp Baronetcy, of Warden Court in the Borough of Maidstone in the County of Kent, was created in the Baronetage of the United Kingdom on 23 June 1922 for Edward Sharp. He was the founder and chairman of Edward Sharp & Sons, manufacturing confectioners, of Maidstone.

== Sharp baronets, of Scotscraig (1683) ==
- see Bethune baronets

== Sharp baronets, of Heckmondwike (1920) ==
- Sir Milton Sheridan Sharp, 1st Baronet (1856–1924)
- Sir Milton Sharp, 2nd Baronet (1880–1941)
- Sir Milton Reginald Sharp, 3rd Baronet (1909–1996)
- Sir Sheridan Christopher Robin Sharp, 4th Baronet (1936–2014)
- Sir Fabian Alexander Sebastian Sharp, 5th Baronet (born 1973)

== Sharp baronets, of Warden Court (1922) ==
Sharp baronets
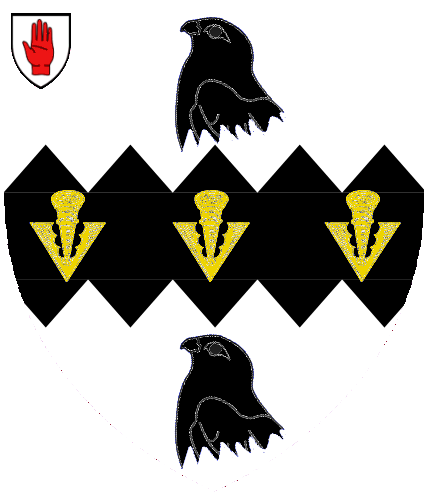
- Crest: Upon a mount Vert a falcon rising Proper belled and resting the dexter claw upon a pheon Or.
- Shield: Argent on a fess indented between two falcons' heads erased Sable three pheons Or.
- Motto: In Veritate Victoria

- Sir Edward Sharp, 1st Baronet (1854–1931)
- Sir Herbert Edward Sharp, 2nd Baronet (1879–1936)
- Sir Edward Herbert Sharp, 3rd Baronet (1927–1985)
- Sir Adrian Sharp, 4th Baronet (born 1951)

The heir apparent is the present holder's son Hayden Sean Sharp (born 1994).
