= Germolene =

Brand of antiseptic products

Germolene is the brand name used on a range of antiseptic products produced by the Bayer company, who purchased the brand from SmithKline Beecham (later GlaxoSmithKline) in 1999. It is manufactured for Bayer UK by the Devon-based Wrafton Laboratories division of US over-the counter and supermarket own-label preparation producer Perrigo.

Germolene is usually a pink cream or white ointment. The brand name is used on a range of over-the-counter first aid preparations, most of which contain antiseptic. There is an associated range of products specifically for the treatment of haemorrhoids.

Germolene was invented by cough mixture tycoon Sir William Henry Veno, who in 1925, fearing he had cancer of the lip, sold his Veno Drug Company to the Beechams Company.

== Composition ==
Germolene's active ingredients include phenol 1.2% (providing antiseptic, locally analgesic and antipruritic effects) and chlorhexidine digluconate 0.25%. The Germoloids line of Germolene products, intended for use on haemorrhoids, also includes zinc oxide, and the analgesic lidocaine hydrochloride.

An older formulation of a thick antiseptic ointment with a distinctive pink colour and scented with oil of wintergreen (methyl salicylate) is no longer sold in many markets but may be available as an import. Active ingredients of this formulation include methyl salicylate, phenol, octaphonium chloride and zinc oxide.

== Adverse effects ==
Germolene cream contains the active ingredient chlorhexidine, which can rarely induce allergic reactions. Symptoms of a minor allergic reaction to Germolene cream include itching, redness (erythema), dermatitis, eczema, rash, hives (urticaria), skin irritation, and blisters on the skin.

In more serious cases of hypersensitivity, symptoms of anaphylaxis may occur. Such symptoms include shortness of breath, swelling of the face, hives, severe rash, and shock. Germolene cream is contraindicated for patients with known hypersensitivity to chlorhexidine or any other components of the cream.

Phenol is toxic to cats and versions containing phenol should be avoided or used with care to avoid ingestion and potentially fatal liver damage.
