= Henry Hubert Hayden =

Anglo-Irish geologist who worked in India and a mountaineer.

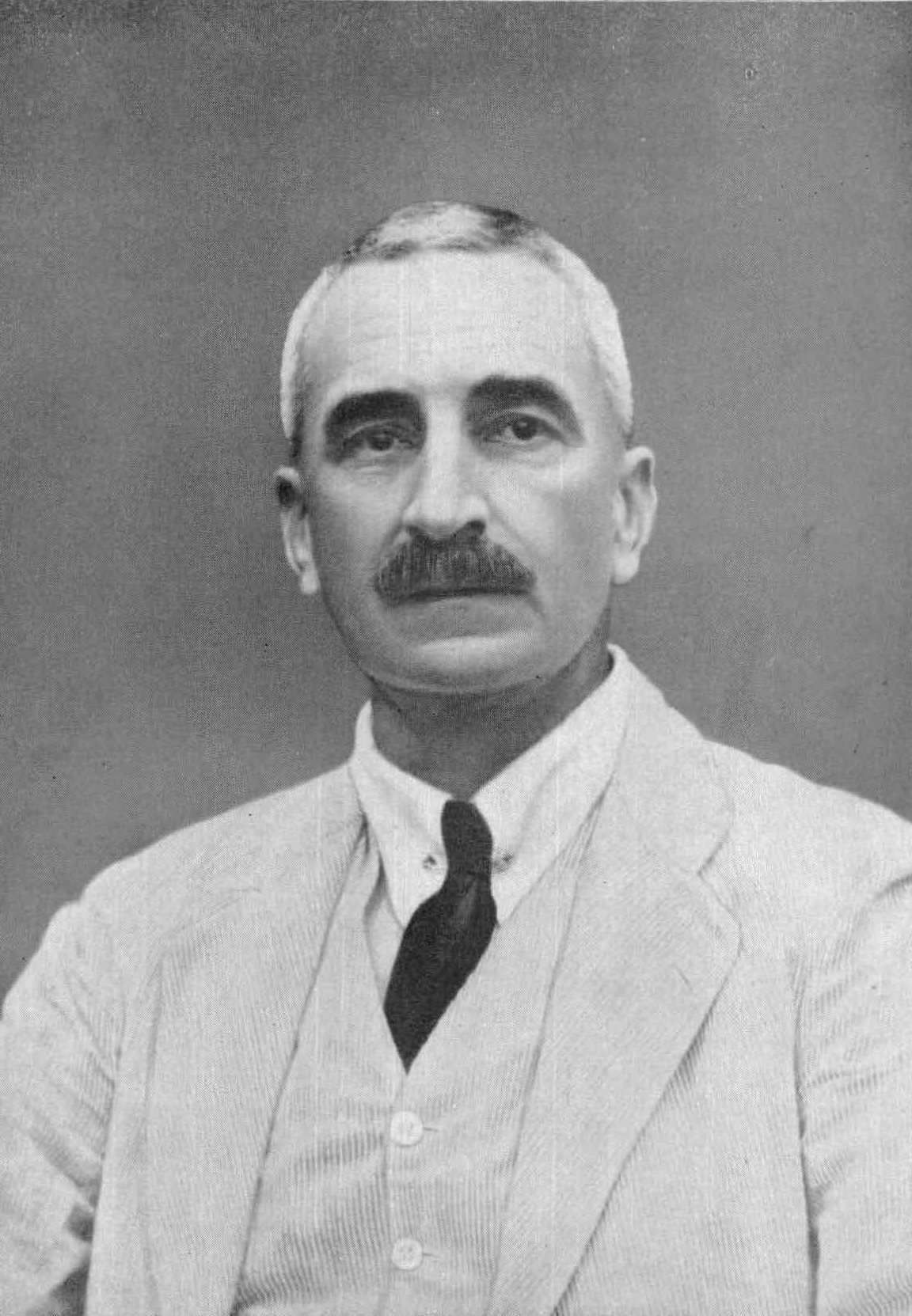

Sir Henry Hubert Hayden CSI CIE (25 July 1869 – 28 August 1923) was a geologist who worked in the Geological Survey of India and a mountaineer.

Hayden was born at Derry and studied at Hilton College in South Africa and then geology at Trinity College, Dublin. On 3 January 1895 he joined the Geological Survey of India (GSI). He studied stratigraphy in various parts of the Himalayas, especially the Spiti area, during the course of his work which included being a geologist in the Tirah Expeditionary Force, 1897–98 and with the Tibet Frontier Commission of 1903 along with Francis Younghusband. He also worked in Afghanistan from 1907–8. He served as Director of the GSI from 1910 to 1920 and was awarded C.I.E. in 1911 and knighted in the 1920 Birthday Honours.

He published on the Geology of Spiti with parts of Bushahr and Rupshu (1904) and a Sketch of the Geography and Geology of the Himalaya Mountains with S.G. Burrard (1907).

Hayden was one of the founders of the Indian Science Congress in 1912 and served as a President in later years. He was also a Fellow of The Asiatic Society of Bengal and its President in 1917–18. He retired in 1922 and returned to England.

Hayden died while on a climbing expedition in Switzerland to Finsteraarhorn. He was returning after the ascent on 12 August when he and his two guides were killed in a rock-slide. His body along with that of César Cosson was only found on 28 August. They were buried at Lauterbrunnen on 1 September by their fellow climbers.
