= Milton Sharp =

English dyer (1856–1924)

Sir Milton Sharp Bt
- Born: Milton Sheridan Sharp; 30 January 1856; Wyke, West Riding of Yorkshire, England
- Died: 22 May 1924 (aged 68)
- Occupation: Dyer

Sir Milton Sheridan Sharp, 1st Baronet (30 January 1856 – 22 May 1924) was an English dyer.

Sharp was born to a wealthy family in Wyke, Yorkshire. He was educated at Shrewsbury School and Trinity Hall, Cambridge. He was chairman of the Bradford Dyers' Association from its incorporation in December 1898 until his death. He was created a baronet in the 1920 Birthday Honours.

== Footnotes ==
Baronetage of the United Kingdom
New creation	Baronet (of Heckmondwike); 1920–1924	Succeeded by Milton Sharp
