= Sleight baronets =

Baronetcy in the Baronetage of the United Kingdom

The Sleight Baronetcy, of Weelsby Hall in Clee in the County of Lincoln, is a title in the Baronetage of the United Kingdom. It was created on 29 June 1920 for the fishing magnate George Sleight. The second Baronet was high sheriff and a justice of the peace and deputy lieutenant for Lincolnshire.

== Sleight baronets, of Weelsby Hall (1920) ==
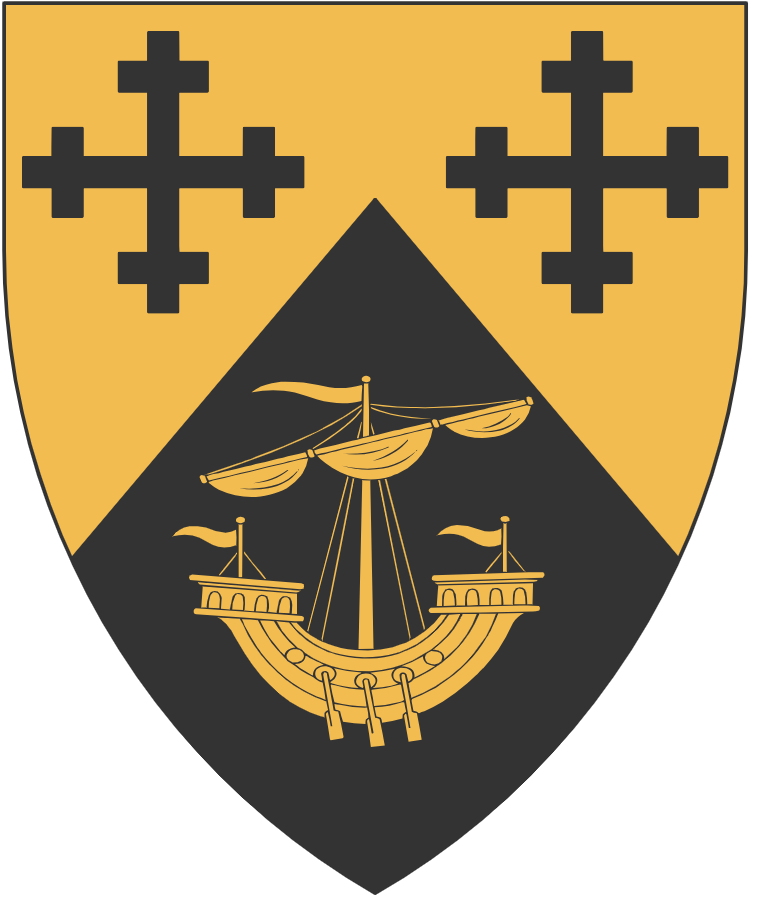
Arms of Sleight of Weelsby Hall: Per chevon or and sable, in chief two cross crosslets and in base a lymphad with sail hoisted counterchanged

- Sir George Frederick Sleight, 1st Baronet (1853–1921)
- Sir Ernest Sleight, 2nd Baronet (1873–1946)
- Sir John Frederick Sleight, 3rd Baronet (1909–1990)
- Sir Richard Sleight, 4th Baronet (born 1946)

The heir apparent is the present holder's son James Alexander Sleight (born 1981).
