= William Bridges (general) =

Australian Army general

Major General Sir William Throsby Bridges KCB CMG
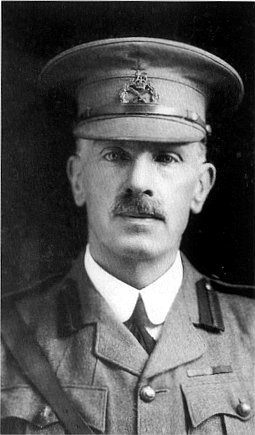
- Major General William Bridges c. 1914
- Born: 18 February 1861; Greenock, Scotland
- Died: 18 May 1915 (aged 54); Dardanelles, Ottoman Empire
- Burial place: Royal Military College, Duntroon
- Military career
- Allegiance: Australia
- Branch: Australian Army
- Service years: 1885–1915
- Rank: Major General
- Commands: 1st Division (1914–15); Royal Military College, Duntroon (1910–14); Chief of the General Staff (1909)
- Conflicts: Second Boer War; First World War; Gallipoli campaign (DOW)
- Awards: Knight Commander of the Order of the Bath; Companion of the Order of St Michael and St George; Mentioned in Despatches

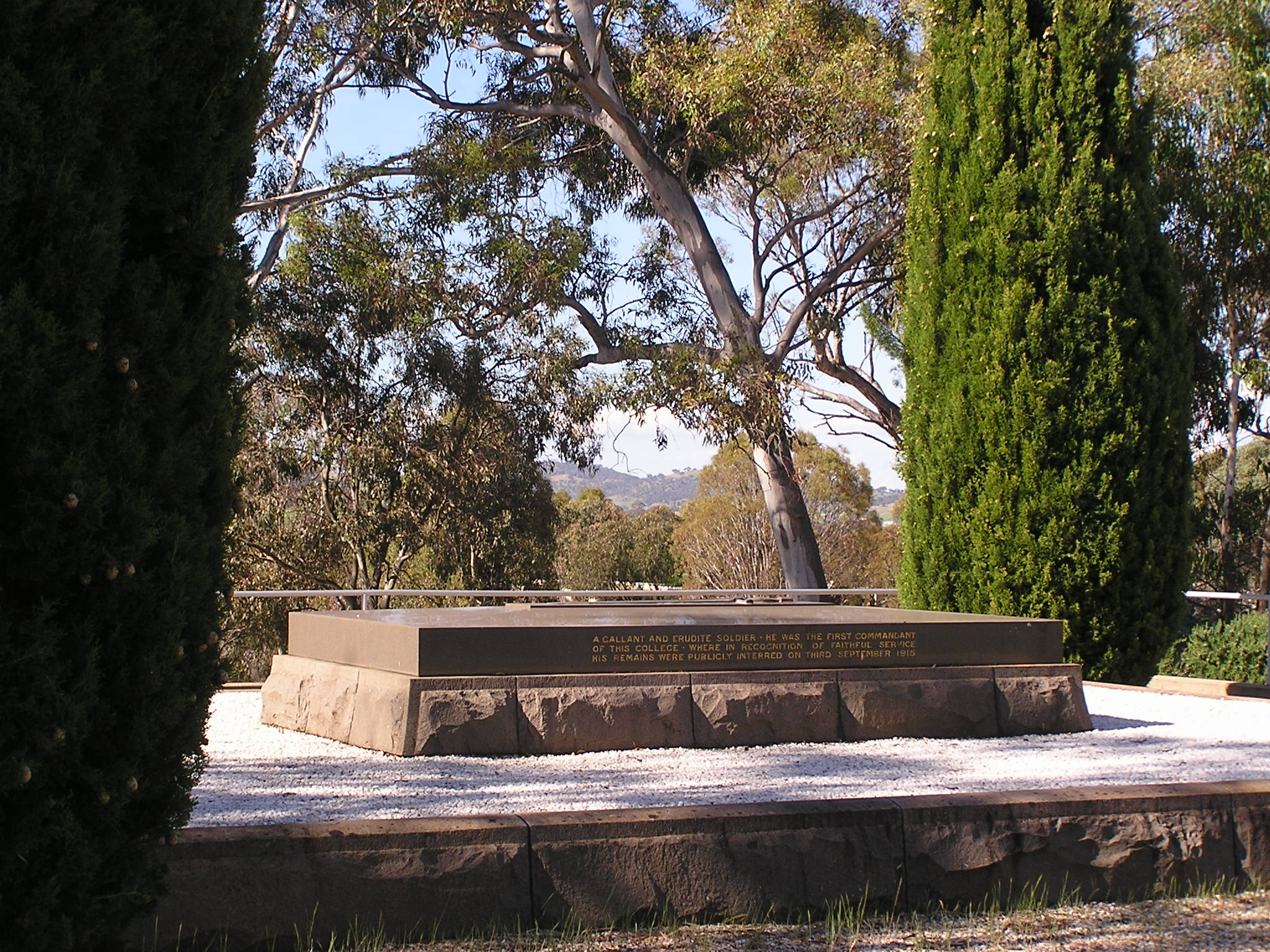
General Bridges' grave at Duntroon. The consultant designer and architect was Walter Burley Griffin

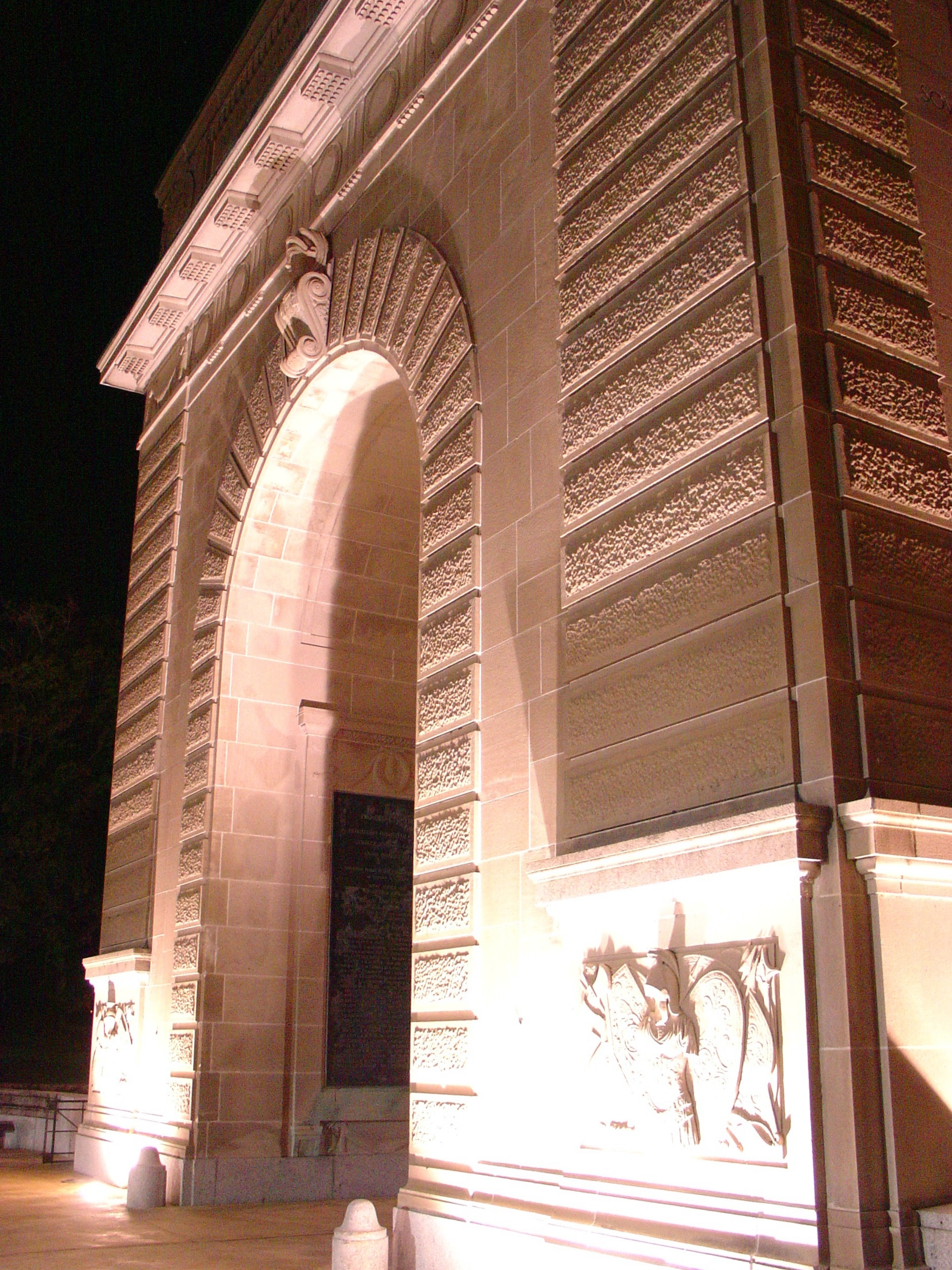
General Bridges is listed on the Memorial Arch at the Royal Military College of Canada in Kingston, Ontario.

Major General Sir William Throsby Bridges, KCB, CMG (18 February 1861 – 18 May 1915) was a senior Australian Army officer who was instrumental in establishing the Royal Military College, Duntroon and who served as the first Australian Chief of the General Staff. During the First World War he commanded the 1st Australian Division at Gallipoli, where he died of wounds on 18 May 1915, becoming the first Australian general officer to be killed during the war. He was the first Australian officer—and the first graduate of Kingston—to reach the rank of major general, the first to command a division, and the first to receive a knighthood. He is one of only two Australians killed in action in the Great War to be interred in Australia.

== Early life ==
Bridges was born on 18 February 1861 in Greenock, Scotland, the son of William Wilson Somerset Bridges, a Royal Navy captain, and his Australian wife, Mary Hill Throsby. He was educated at Ryde on the Isle of Wight, before attending the Royal Naval School at New Cross, London, in 1871. He remained there until mid-1872 when his family moved to Canada, after his father was badly injured in an accident and forced to retire from the navy. For the next three years, Bridges was a boarder at the Trinity College School, at Port Hope, Ontario. On 10 April 1877, at the age of 16, he entered the newly established Royal Military College of Canada in Kingston as part of the college's second intake, and was assigned the student number 25.

Although tall, Bridges was of slight build and was not noted for his involvement in sport while at the college, spending most of his spare time reading; nevertheless, he became a keen canoeist as a cadet. Although he was a good student, he became unsettled and began failing his courses when his family migrated to Australia leaving him in Kingston. In June 1879, having received his Certificate of Military Qualifications, Bridges was permitted to leave the college, becoming its first drop out after his father paid a $100 fine to withdraw him. Travelling on the transport Zealandia, Bridges arrived in Sydney in August and joined his family who had settled in his mother's home town of Moss Vale, New South Wales. Shortly after his arrival, he began working for the Department of Roads and Bridges at Braidwood, and by 1884 he had become an inspector in the Narrabri district.

== Military career ==
=== Early career and Boer War ===
In early 1885, in response to the fall of Khartoum and the death of General Charles Gordon during the British campaign against the Dervish revolt in Sudan, the colony of New South Wales raised a military contingent consisting of an infantry battalion, with artillery and supporting units, for service with the British. In an effort to enlist, Bridges travelled to Sydney from Narrabri, but by the time he had arrived, the force had already been raised. Nevertheless, due to concerns about Russian intentions in Afghanistan, the Australian colonies began expanding their military forces, and on 19 May that year he was commissioned as a lieutenant into the New South Wales Artillery. Initially his appointment was only temporary, but he was later offered a permanent position.

The following year Bridges undertook an artillery officers' course at the School of Gunnery at Middle Head, after which he was posted there as a staff officer. In 1889 he qualified as a gunnery instructor and in October 1890, having been promoted to captain the month before, he was sent to the Royal Military Academy, Woolwich and to the Royal School of Gunnery at Shoeburyness for training. Upon returning to Australia in 1893 he became Chief Instructor at the Middle Head School of Gunnery. He was promoted to major in September 1895, and he held positions on several military committees and conferences. In late 1899 Bridges became one of four New South Wales officers seconded to serve with British Army units during the Second Boer War. During his time in South Africa he took part in actions around Kimberley, Paardeberg and Driefontein before contracting typhoid. After being evacuated to England, he returned to Australia in September 1900.

Upon his return, Bridges took command of the Brigade Division of Field Artillery as well as holding various staff appointments. In 1901 the Australian colonies federated, and the various colonial military forces coalesced into the Australian Army. Bridges undertook a quick succession of appointments: Assistant Quartermaster General of the Army HQ in Melbourne; Chief of Military Intelligence; Chief of the Australian General Staff, achieving the rank of lieutenant colonel in July 1902 and then colonel in October 1906. In 1909, he went to London as Australia's representative on the Imperial General Staff.

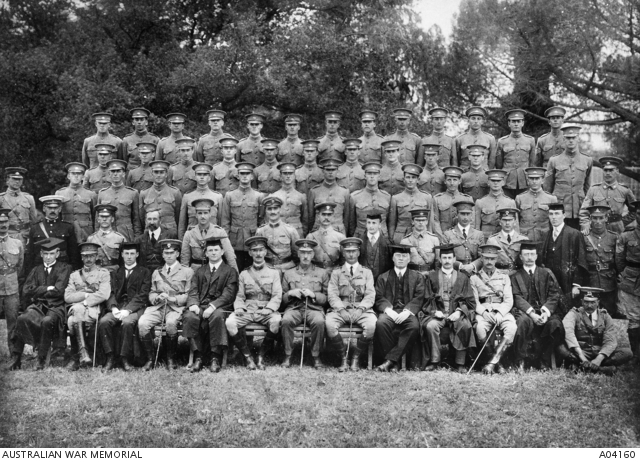
Group portrait of members of the Second Class at the RMC, Duntroon, with their officers and sergeant majors, December 1913. Brigadier General W. T. Bridges, the college's commandant, is sat in the centre of the front row.

In 1910 Bridges was promoted to brigadier general and, on the recommendation of Lord Kitchener, was recalled to Australia to become the first commandant of the Royal Military College at Duntroon. On his way back to Australia, Bridges inspected various military academies, including Sandhurst, Woolwich, and West Point. He chose the site of the old Campbell homestead and in line with Kitchener's recommendations, Bridges largely modelled Duntroon on the United States Military Academy at West Point. He remained commandant of the college until May 1914, when he was appointed Inspector General of the Army.

=== First World War ===
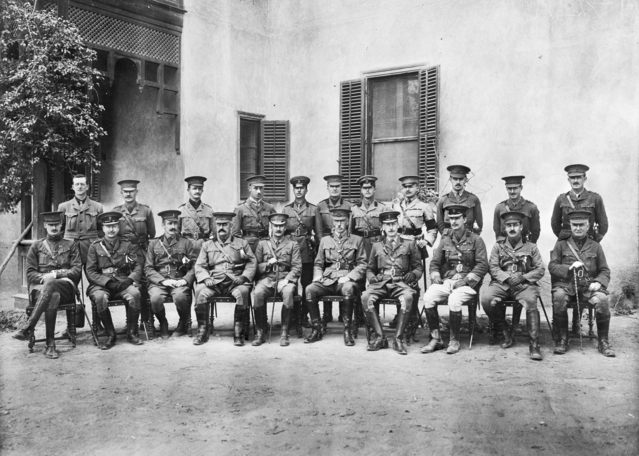
Group portrait of 1st Division staff officers at Mena Camp, December 1914. Major General Bridges is in the front row, fifth from the left.

When war broke out, Bridges was in Queensland on an inspection tour, and he returned to Melbourne on 5 August 1914. He met the Australian cabinet, was promoted to the rank of major general, and was charged with the creation of an expeditionary force of 20,000 men for overseas service, known as the Australian Imperial Force (AIF). As this force was raised, Bridges convinced the government to graduate the first class of Duntroon cadets early. Once the force was raised, Bridges and his command sailed from Albany, Western Australia and Fremantle, Western Australia in late October, bound for England, where they were to undertake a period of training before being committed to the fighting on the Western Front. En route, the destination was changed from England to Egypt, where they landed on 1 December. In Egypt, Bridges set to work training his troops, which were organised as the 1st Australian Division. On 25 April, as part the Australian and New Zealand Army Corps, Bridges' command was among the first ashore at Anzac Cove, at the start of the Gallipoli campaign.

After the initial landing, the Australian and New Zealand troops established a beachhead around Anzac Cove, but during early May a period of stalemate followed as the Turkish defenders prevented them from advancing inland. Bridges suggested withdrawing the force, but he was over-ruled. During this time, Bridges inspected the front lines on a daily basis, despite the risks. On 15 May 1915, he was shot through the femoral artery in his right leg by a Turkish sniper. Dragged to safety, he was evacuated to the hospital ship Gascon. Infection set in but amputation was deemed impossible since he had lost so much blood. On 17 May 1915, Bridges was appointed a Knight Commander of the Order of the Bath, although the award was not formally gazetted until 22 May. He was also posthumously Mentioned in Despatches, having died on board the hospital ship on 18 May.

Bridges was buried in Alexandria but in June his body was returned to Melbourne where he received a state funeral. Bridges is the only identified Australian killed in the First World War to have had his body repatriated and buried on Australian soil. His funeral service was conducted at St Paul's Cathedral, Melbourne. He was buried on 3 September 1915 at Duntroon on the slopes of Mount Pleasant.

== Personal life ==
On 10 October 1885, Bridges married Edith Lilian Francis (1862–1926), daughter of Alfred John Dawson Francis and Margaret Agnes Anne Francis (formerly Wilson, born Green) at St John's Church, Darlinghurst, New South Wales, which was the same church in which his parents had married in 1858. They had seven children, three of whom died young. Bridges was survived by Edith and their four living children; one of his sons, William Francis, later followed in his footsteps, serving on the Western Front, achieving the rank of major in the AIF and receiving the Distinguished Service Order.

He was also survived by his horse "Sandy", the only Australian Waler horse to return from the First World War, due to quarantine restrictions. It is not clear when Bridges met Sandy but after his death Sandy was cared for by a number of Army vets until, by order of the Minister of Defence, the horse was returned to Australia where he lived at the Remount Depot at Maribyrnong, before being put down in 1923 due to ill health.

== Dates of rank ==
Rank	Date	Position
Lieutenant	May 1885	Gunnery Officer—New South Wales Contingent
Captain	September 1890	Instructor—New South Wales School of Gunnery
Major	September 1895	Chief Instructor—New South Wales School of Gunnery
Lieutenant Colonel	July 1902	Assistant Quartermaster General—Australian Military Forces
Colonel	October 1906	Chief of Military Intelligence; Chief of the Australian General Staff
Brigadier General	May 1910	Commandant of the Royal Military College, Duntroon; Inspector General—Australian Military Forces
Major General	August 1914	Commander of the Australian Imperial Force

== Honours, awards and decorations ==
Knight Commander of the Order of the Bath (KCB)	Awarded 1915
Companion of the Order of St Michael and St George (CMG)	Awarded 1909
Queen's South Africa Medal	
1914–15 Star	
British War Medal	
Victory Medal with palm for Mentioned in Dispatches	

== Legacy ==
Sir William Throsby Bridges is memorialised by a memorial tablet in the Anglican Church of St John the Baptist, in Canberra, where his wife is buried. The tablet was unveiled on 9 December 1930, on the final Duntroon graduation day before the college temporarily moved to Victoria Barracks, in Sydney, having been paid for by subscriptions from former AIF officers. His epitaph reads: "Major General Sir William Throsby Bridges KCB CMG died on 18 May 1915 from wounds received at Gallipoli peninsula whilst in command of the Australian Imperial Force. A gallant and erudite soldier, he was the first commandant of this College, where in recognition of faithful service his remains were publicly interred on Third September 1915". As an ex- Kingston cadet, Bridges' name is also listed on the Memorial Arch at the Royal Military College of Canada in Kingston, Ontario, and he is commemorated on the Canadian Virtual War Memorial and on page 566 of the Canadian First World War Book of Remembrance.

== See also ==
- List of generals of the British Empire who died during the First World War

== Sources ==
Books

- Coulthard-Clark, Christopher (1979). A Heritage of Spirit: A Biography of Major-General Sir William Throsby Bridges K.C.B., C.M.G. Carlton, Victoria: Melbourne University Press. ISBN 0-522-84170-8.
- Dolan, Hugh (2010). 36 Days: The Untold Story Behind the Gallipoli Landings. Sydney, New South Wales: Pan Australia. ISBN 9781742621692.
- Preston, Richard (1969). Canada's RMC: A History of the Royal Military College. Toronto: University of Toronto Press. ISBN 9780802032225.

Websites

- "Sandy – The Only Horse to Return from the First World War". Australian War Memorial.
- Coulthard-Clark, Christopher (1979). "Bridges, Sir William Throsby (1861–1915)". Australian Dictionary of Biography. Vol. 7. National Centre of Biography, Australian National University. ISBN 978-0-522-84459-7. ISSN 1833-7538. OCLC 70677943.
- "Bridges, William Throsby: KCB". It's an Honour. Commonwealth of Australia.
- "First World War Service Record – William Throsby Bridges". National Archives of Australia.
- "Honours and Awards – William Throsby Bridges". Australian War Memorial.
- "Military Memorials in the National Capital" (PDF). National Capital Authority.
- "History". St Johns Canberra. Archived from the original on 6 October 2011.
- Van Straubenzee, A.H. "Major-General Sir William Throsby Bridges, K.C.B., C.M.G." Trinity College School Record, October 1946 – August 1947.
- "Canadian Virtual War Memorial William Bridges". Veterans Affairs Canada. Archived from the original on 19 July 2011.

Military offices
Preceded by Major General Harry Finn as General Officer Commanding, the Forces of Australia	Chief of the General Staff; 1 January – 25 May 1909	Succeeded by Major General Sir John Charles Hoad
