= Sir John Beynon, 1st Baronet =

Welsh iron and steel manufacturer and coal owner (1864-1944)

Sir John Beynon Bt CBE
- Born: John Wyndham Beynon; 2 December 1864; Castleton, Monmouthshire, Wales
- Died: 13 October 1944 (aged 79)
- Occupations: Iron and steel manufacturer, coal owner

Sir John Wyndham Beynon, 1st Baronet (2 December 1864 – 13 October 1944) was a Welsh iron and steel manufacturer and coal owner.

Beynon was born in Castleton, Monmouthshire. He was educated at Clifton College, after which he went into business and eventually became chairman and managing director of the Ebbw Vale Steel Iron and Coal Company, as well as being a director of a number of other iron, steel and coal concerns. He was also chairman of the South Wales Coal Owners' Association.

During the First World War he served in the Army Service Corps as a major, commanding the Monmouthshire (Volunteer) Motor Transport. He was also Monmouthshire county director of Auxiliary Hospitals and Voluntary Aid Detachments for the British Red Cross Society. He was High Sheriff of Monmouthshire in 1917.

He was appointed Commander of the Order of the British Empire (CBE) in the 1920 civilian war honours for his services to the Red Cross and was created a baronet ('of the Coldra, in the parish of Christchurch and the County of Monmouth') in the 1920 Birthday Honours less than three months later for his services to the coal industry. He was also appointed Esquire of the Order of St John (EsqStJ) in 1920, promoted to Commander (CStJ) in 1926, and to Knight of Justice (KStJ) in 1931.

Escutcheon of the Beynon baronets of The Coldra

== Footnotes ==
Baronetage of the United Kingdom
New creation	Baronet (of the Coldra); 1920–1944	Extinct
