= Charles Moncrieff Goodyear =

British surveyor

3rd Surveyor General of Malaysia
- In office 1 July 1920 – 26 July 1922
- Preceded by: Joseph Peascod Harper
- Succeeded by: Victor Alexander Lowinger

Personal details
- Born: 26 July 1867 Manchester, Lancashire
- Died: 22 December 1923 (aged 56) Middlesex, England
- Citizenship: British
- Spouse: Ethel Orr

Charles Moncrieff Goodyear (26 July 1867 - 22 December 1923) was a British surveyor, who served as the third Surveyor-General of the Federated Malay States, from 1920 to 1922.

== Biography ==
Charles Moncrieff Goodyear was born 26 July 1867 in Manchester, Lancashire, the eldest son of Charles Goodyear (1838-1925) and Margaret Millie née Blair (1844-1869). He studied at Manchester Grammar School, between 1877 and 1885 before attending Merton College, Oxford. In 1887 he received second class honours in Mathematical Moderations, in 1889 honours in Mathematics and in 1890 as Bachelor of Arts degree.

In September 1893 he qualified as licensed land surveyor in New South Wales, Australia. On 2 May 1902 he was appointed as a surveyor (1st grade) in Selangor and in June 1904 he was promoted to Supernumerary District Surveyor. He went onto take charge of the Negeri Sembilan Surveying Department. On 1 July 1920 he was appointed Surveyor-General of the Federated Malay States, replacing Joseph Peascod Harper, remaining in the position until he retired on 26 July 1922.

He returned to England after retiring from Survey Department and in April 1923 married a widow, Ethel Orr, in France.

Goodyear died on 22 December 1923 in Middlesex, England, at the age of 53.

In June 1926 his wife, Ethel, remarried R. P. Maw in Algeria.

== See also ==
- Surveyor General of Malaysia
