= Luis Sigismund Himley =

English surveyor (1906–1984)

Louis Sigismund Himley
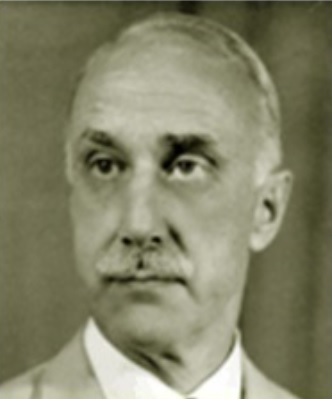

10th Surveyor General of Malaysia
- In office 13 March 1956 – 1 April 1960
- Preceded by: Christopher Noble
- Succeeded by: Arnold Lessel MacMorland Greig

Personal details
- Born: 28 November 1906 Macagua, Cuba
- Died: 18 April 1984 (aged 77) Bovey Tracey, Devon
- Resting place: Manaton, Devon
- Spouse: Christine Mary Douglas
- Children: three

Luis Sigismund Himley (28 November 1906 – 18 April 1984) was an English surveyor, who served as the tenth Surveyor-General of the Federated Malay States between 1956 and 1960.

Luis Sigismund Himley was born in Macagua, Cuba on 28 November 1906, the son of William Charles Himley (1863–1924) and Violet Emily née Brune (1872–1945). He attended St. John's College, Cambridge, matriculating in 1928. In September 1929 he took up a position with the Survey Department of the Federated Malay States and the Straits Settlement. On 9 August 1931 he was promoted to assistant superintendent in Selangor.

Himley married Christine Mary Douglas (1908–1990), in April 1934, in Newton Abbot, Devon. They had three children.

Prior to World War II he was appointed as a captain in the Straits Settlements Volunteer Force.

In September 1950 he was appointed the surveyor for Singapore. On 13 March 1956 he was appointed as the Surveyor-General of Federation of Malaysia, following the retirement of Christopher Noble. He remained in that position until 1 April 1960.

In February 1961 he travelled to Mauritius where he was commissioned to prepare a report on the cadastral survey of Mauritius to the Directorate of Overseas Surveys, which he completed and presented on 16 May that year.

He died on 18 April 1984 in Bovey Tracey, Devon. England, at the age of 77. He was buried in Manaton, Devon.

== See also ==
- Surveyor General of Malaysia
