= Amatikulu Nature Reserve =

Nature reserve in South Africa

- Location within South Africa
- Coordinates: 29°06′14″S 31°35′33″E
- Area: 15.72 square kilometres (1,572 ha)

The Amatikulu Nature Reserve is a wildlife reserve located at the confluence of the Matigulu and Nyoni Rivers in the province of KwaZulu-Natal, South Africa, operated by Ezemvelo KZN Wildlife. The reserve covers around 15.72 square kilometers of coastal land and is known for its rich South African subtropical fauna and flora, in particular birds, giraffe, zebra, waterbuck and various small antelope. The area is also known for its crocodile population and Humpback whale sightings which occur annually between September and November.

Located at the Matigulu River mouth, the reserve comprises a diversity of ecosystems, including local South African grassland, coastal lowland forest, beach, coastal dune and estuarine systems.

The reserve is located approximately 10 km from the sugar milling town of Amatikulu.
