= Archibald Mitchelson =

British banker (1878–1945)

Sir Archibald Mitchelson Bt
- Born: 1 April 1878
- Died: 30 December 1945 (aged 67)
- Occupation: Investment banker

Sir Archibald Mitchelson, 1st Baronet (1 April 1878 – 30 December 1945) was a British investment banker.

He was chairman of Mitchelson Partners Ltd, as well as D. Davis & Sons Ltd, the shipbuilders J. Samuel White & Co Ltd, Old Silkstone Collieries Ltd, Admiralty Collieries Ltd, North's Navigation Collieries Ltd, Wharncliffe Collieries Ltd, Yorkshire Collieries Ltd, Great Universal Stores Ltd, Anglo-Continental Guano Works Ltd, Pangnga River Tin Concessions Ltd, Genatosan Ltd, and Kamunting Tin Dredging Ltd. He was also president of Porcupine-Davidson Gold Mines Ltd of Ontario and a director of a number of other companies.

He was created a baronet in the 1920 Birthday Honours.

== Footnotes ==
Baronetage of the United Kingdom
New creation	Baronet (of Rotherfield); 1920–1945	Extinct
