= Sir John Anderson, 1st Baronet, of Harrold Priory =

Scottish businessman, writer and lecturer (1878–1963)

Sir John Anderson Bt

Personal details
- Born: 8 May 1878 Glasgow, Scotland
- Died: 11 April 1963 (aged 84) London, England
- Occupation: Road haulage magnate

Anderson baronets
- Escutcheon of the Anderson baronets of Harrold Priory
- Creation date: 1920
- Status: extinct
- Extinction date: 1963

Sir John Anderson, 1st Baronet (8 May 1878 – 11 April 1963) was a Scottish businessman, writer and lecturer.

He was born in Glasgow to Peter Anderson, a slater, and Margaret Crawford Anderson. He was educated at Allan Glen's School and the University of Glasgow. He entered the family road haulage business, P. & W. A. Anderson Ltd, and became managing director. He was created a baronet, of Harrold Priory in the County of Bedford, in the 1920 Birthday Honours.

In 1911, Anderson married Janet Barr Bilsland, who died in 1940. In 1941, he married Muriel Stanley-Wiggins, who died in 1953. He had no children and the baronetage became extinct upon his death in 1963.
