= Surveyor General of Malaysia =

Malaysian government position

The surveyor general of Malaysia was the head of the Federated Malay States Survey Department, now known as Department of Survey and Mapping Malaysia.

The first surveyor general, Colonel Hugh Milbourne Jackson, took up the role on 25 September 1908, and on 1 January 1909 his responsibility was expanded to include the four State Revenue Survey Departments (Perak, Selangor, Negeri Sembilan and Pahang) with the Trigonometrical Survey Department. The Topographic Branch was formed in 1910, and the organisation expanded to five other unfederated states (Johore, Kedah, Perlis, Kelantan and Terengganu) between 1910 and 1926. The organisation added the Straits Settlement Survey Department (Penang, Malacca and Singapore) in 1920. The department continued to operate until Malaysia was formed in 1963, when it became the Department of Survey and Mapping headed by a director general. There were eleven surveyors general from 1908 until 1963.

== List of surveyors general ==
| No. | Name | Picture | Took office | Left office | Birth | Place of birth | Death | Place of death | Age |
|---|---|---|---|---|---|---|---|---|---|
| 1 | Hugh Milbourne Jackson | | 25 September 1908 | 8 March 1919 | 27 March 1858 | East Riding of Yorkshire, Kingston upon Hull, England | 9 January 1940 | Limpsfield, Surrey, England | 82 |
| 2 | Joseph Peascod Harper | | 8 March 1919 | 30 June 1920 | March 1861 | Cumberland, England | 4 April 1951 | Somerset, England | 90 |
| 3 | Charles Moncrieff Goodyear | | 1 July 1920 | 26 July 1922 | 26 July 1867 | Manchester, England | 22 December 1923 | Middlesex, England | 56 |
| 4 | Victor Alexander Lowinger | | 27 July 1922 | 4 June 1933 | 26 January 1879 | St George Hanover Square, London England | 9 August 1957 | Kensington, England | 78 |
| 5 | John Robert Dewar | | 5 June 1933 | 26 March 1938 | 10 December 1883 | Alexandra, Otago, New Zealand | 12 April 1964 | Bournemouth, Hampshire, England | 80 |
| 6 | William Francis Noel Bridges | | 27 March 1938 | 27 February 1942 | 30 January 1890 | Middle Head, New South Wales, Australia | 1 January 1942 | Lost at sea (Sunda Straits) | 52 |
| 7 | Percy Herbert Bonnet | | 25 September 1945 | 28 September 1949 | 25 July 1896 | Bundaberg, Queensland, Australia | 11 October 1987 | Queensland, Australia | 91 |
| 8 | Alfred George Billing | | 7 October 1949 | 2 September 1953 | 12 August 1903 | Indooroopilly, Queensland | 13 March 1989 | Brisbane, Queensland | 87 |
| 9 | Christopher Noble | | 3 September 1953 | 12 March 1956 | September 1902 | Middlesbrough, Yorkshire, England | 1986 | England | 84 |
| 10 | Luis Sigismund Himley | | 13 March 1956 | 1 April 1960 | 28 November 1906 | Macagua, Cuba | 18 April 1984 | Bovey Tracey, Devon, England | 77 |
| 11 | Arnold Lessel MacMorland Greig | | 2 April 1960 | 3 February 1963 | 24 February 1913 | Amatikulu, Zululand, South Africa | July 1984 | New Zealand | 71 |
