= Gareth Mitchelson =

- Born: 1967 (age 58–59); Monifieth
- Occupation: Accountant
- Career
- Current group: CelticSpirit Dance Company
- Former groups: Funky Faeries; Generating Heat
- Dances: Highland; Scottish step
- Website: toeandheel.com

Gareth Mitchelson (born 7 April 1967 in Dundee) is a Scottish dancer. He won the World Highland dancer Championship four times and is now a qualified teacher, adjudicator and examiner in Highland and Scottish step. He is a delegate to the SOBHD and a director of Scottish Dance Traditions.

Mitchelson is involved with his brother Deryck in several projects aimed at improving the world of dance through the use of technology, including DVDs, the internet and portable technology.

== Highland dance ==
Mitchelson started dancing at the age of 6, learning from his mother Wilma Tolmie (herself a world champion) and very quickly started to compete at the competition and highland games. He won his first championship at age 9.

He is also a qualified teacher, adjudicator examiner and delegate to the Scottish Official Board of Highland Dancing (SOBHD) Technical Committee for the United Kingdom Alliance (UKA).

Mitchelson's involvement in Highland dance has extended beyond the competition boards and, together with his brother Deryck, includes:

- founding the CelticSpirit Dance Co.
- creating the toeandheel.com website
- producing the Advanced Highland Technique DVD series
- developing the toeandheelGOLD Highland Dance pumps

== Highland dancing world titles ==
Mitchelson won the senior World Highland Dancing title at his first attempt and then, after coming overall second in 1986, went on to win the title in each of the next three years.

- 1985: Adult
- 1987: Adult
- 1988: Adult
- 1989: Adult

The Highland Dancing World Championships are held at the Cowal Gathering in Dunoon on the last Saturday in August each year.

== Performances ==
Whilst still at school Mitchelson was a member of the world-renowned British Caledonian Airways pipes and dance corps, performing at Scottish events all over the world.

In 1985 Gareth and Deryck Mitchelson commissioned new work and music for inclusion in Glasgow's Mayfest dance festival and formalised this with the formation of the CelticSpirit Dance Company as a limited liability company.

Other notable performances have included participation in many folk festivals and fiddlers' rallies, in the Capitol Theatre and His Majesty's Theatre in Aberdeen, several royal performances, commission pieces for Scottish Dance Traditions (Generating Heat and Funky Faeries), twice appearing at the Dorothy Chandler Pavilion in Los Angeles and several TV Hogmanay shows.

== Scottish dance traditions ==
Preservation of Scottish dance traditions is important to Gareth. His dance company, CelticSpirit, works towards this by making Scottish dance move accessible to the public - mixing traditional and contemporary dance forms and rhythms and presenting them in a modern and at times risque way.

Mitchelson is also pushing to have some of the many no longer danced steps re-introduced into competition via the SOBHD. He also spends a considerable effort working with Scotland's only national organisation which exists to promote and encourage participation and enjoyment in all forms of Scottish traditional dance - Scottish Dance Traditions.

== Memberships ==
- Tayside Highland Dancing Association (member since 1984)
- British Association of teachers of Dance (teacher 1988-2003)
- United Kingdom Alliance (teacher and examiner since 2003)
- SOBHD (adjudicator since 1988, delegate since 1984)
- Scottish Dance Traditions (director since 2002)

== Commercial developments ==
Gareth and Deryck Mitchelson are now involved with a number of free and commercial dance-related projects:

- toeandheel.com - a free to use website containing Highland dance news, event calendar, dancer profiles and technical updates
- toeandheelGOLD Highland Dance Pumps - pumps designed to enhance the dancer's points
- Advanced Highland Technique DVDs - a series of teaching DVDs covering all the technique currently used in competition
- Highland Scrutineer - a software scrutineering package used by most of the major Highland dancing events throughout the world to compile the competition results

== Charity ==
In 2008 Mitchelson's and his wife Donna's son was diagnosed with Duchenne muscular dystrophy and he since has campaigned to raise public awareness of the condition and funds for the charities Action Duchenne and the Eileen McCallum Trust. His best known efforts here so far have been his 40 step Fling for Logan and his 50 step Cowal Fling Challenge.
