= William Francis Noel Bridges =

Australian surveyor (1890–1942)

Major William Francis Noel Bridges DSO (30 January 1890 - 28 February 1942) was an Australian surveyor and the sixth Surveyor General of the Federated Malay States between 1938 and 1942.

William Francis Noel Bridges was born on 30 January 1890 at Middle Head, New South Wales, Australia, the second son and fourth of seven children, of Sir William Throsby Bridges and Edith Lilian née Francis (1862–1926). He was educated at Melbourne Grammar School and Trinity College before attending Melbourne University.

In September 1912 he joined the Survey Department of the Federated Malay States, eventually being promoted to Assistant Superintendent of Surveys. Following the outbreak of World War I he travelled independently to England and joined the Royal Northumberland Fusiliers, he subsequently enlisted in Australian Imperial Force on 23 August 1915. On 23 October 1915 he was promoted to Captain 2nd Australian Division Headquarters. On 1 November 1916 he was promoted to Major and on 19 July 1917 to Brigadier Major.

He married Doris Frances Graham-Bonar French (1890-1967) on 27 November 1917 at Hendon, Middlesex, England.

Bridges served at Gallipoli and on the Western Front, with the 25th Australian Infantry Battalion, where he was wounded in Flanders on 12 August 1918. He was awarded the Distinguished Service Order on 27 December 1917.

Following the end of World War I he resigned his appointment was demobilised on 21 March 1919 and returned to his post-war position in Malaysia. He was appointed Surveyor General of Malaysia on 27 March 1938.

In 1941 he was appointed Director of Military Surveys, Malaya. Bridges served a Lieutenant Colonel in the Federated Malay States Volunteer Force.

During the Fall of Singapore Bridges along with a number of senior staff from the Malayan Survey Department, boarded the SS. Ban Ho Guan, evacuating Padang before it fell to the Japanese. The ship was sunk, possibly by a Japanese submarine, on 28 February or 1 March 1942.
