= Pasupuleti Parankusam Naidu =

M. R. Ry. Diwan Bahadur Pasupuleti Parankusam Naidu (23 July 1866 - date of death unknown) was an Indian police officer. He was the first Indian to serve as commissioner of police, Madras, appointed in 1919.

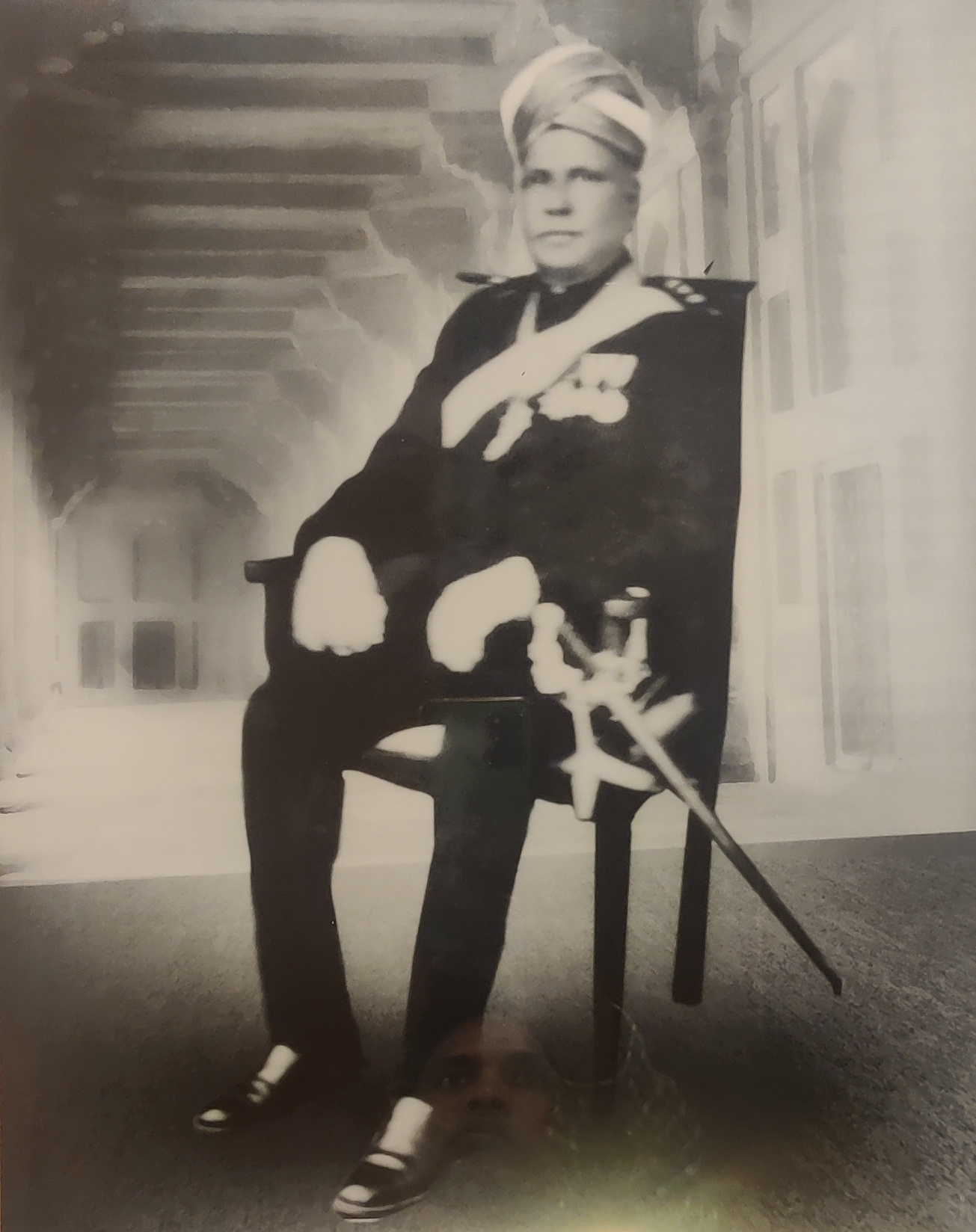
Portrait of Pasupuleti Parankusam Naidu on display at the Tamil Nadu Police Museum, Chennai.

== Education ==
He was educated at Pachaiyappa’s College, Madras.

== Career ==
Naidu began his government service as a clerk in the Office of the Chief Engineer for Irrigation, Madras, in 1887. He joined the Police Department in 1890 as a fourth-grade police inspector. He was promoted to first-grade inspector in 1901, deputy superintendent of police in 1906, assistant commissioner of police, Madras, in 1908, and deputy commissioner of police, Madras, in 1911.

He served as deputy commissioner for seven years. During this period, Madras faced serious law-and-order problems after the outbreak of the First World War. The shelling of the city by the German ship Emden in 1914 caused panic and a large number of people left the city. Shortages of food and rising prices led to unrest, including rioting and looting. Naidu played a major role in restoring order. Under his leadership, the police managed public disturbances and took charge of distributing rice to the public, which helped reduce shortages and calm the situation.

In 1919, Naidu was appointed commissioner of police, Madras, becoming the first Indian to hold the post. As Commissioner, he introduced organisational changes that improved the working of the city police. He retired from service in 1921.

== Honours ==
He was awarded the title Rao Bahadur in 1904 and Diwan Bahadur in 1914. He was awarded I.S.O. in 1920 and the King’s Police Medal in the same year. He received the Coronation Durbar Medal. He was also granted a jagir in 1919.

== Later life ==
After retirement, Naidu remained active in public and social organisations. He served as district commissioner of the Boy Scouts in Madras. He was vice-president of the Indian Officers’ Association and vice-president of the Nayudu Sangam.
