= Henry Lancelot Mawbey =

Royal Navy Admiral (1870–1933)

Portrait by Walter Stoneman, 1919

Admiral Henry Lancelot Mawbey, CB, CVO (17 June 1870 – 4 June 1933) was a Royal Navy officer. He was Director of the Royal Indian Marine from 1920 to 1922.

== Naval career ==
Mawbey joined the Royal Navy. By February 1903 he was a commander when he was posted to the battleship HMS Sans Pareil, guardship at Sheerness. He was promoted to captain on 31 December 1907, and was in command of the light cruiser HMS Dartmouth from 10 July 1911.
