= AMatikulu =

aMatikulu
- Location within KwaZulu-Natal Location within South Africa
- Coordinates: 29.05°S 31.533333°E
- Country: South Africa
- Province: KwaZulu-Natal
- District: Uthungulu
- Municipality: uMlalazi

Area
  - Total: 1.39 km^{2} (0.54 sq mi)

Population (2011)
  - Total: 515
  - Density: 371/km^{2} (960/sq mi)

Racial makeup (2011)
  - Black African: 74.0%
  - Coloured: 3.3%
  - Indian/Asian: 16.9%
  - White: 5.4%
  - Other: 0.4%

First languages (2011)
  - Zulu: 59.8%
  - English: 26.1%
  - Afrikaans: 5.7%
  - S. Ndebele: 4.7%
  - Other: 3.7%
- Time zone: UTC+2 (SAST)

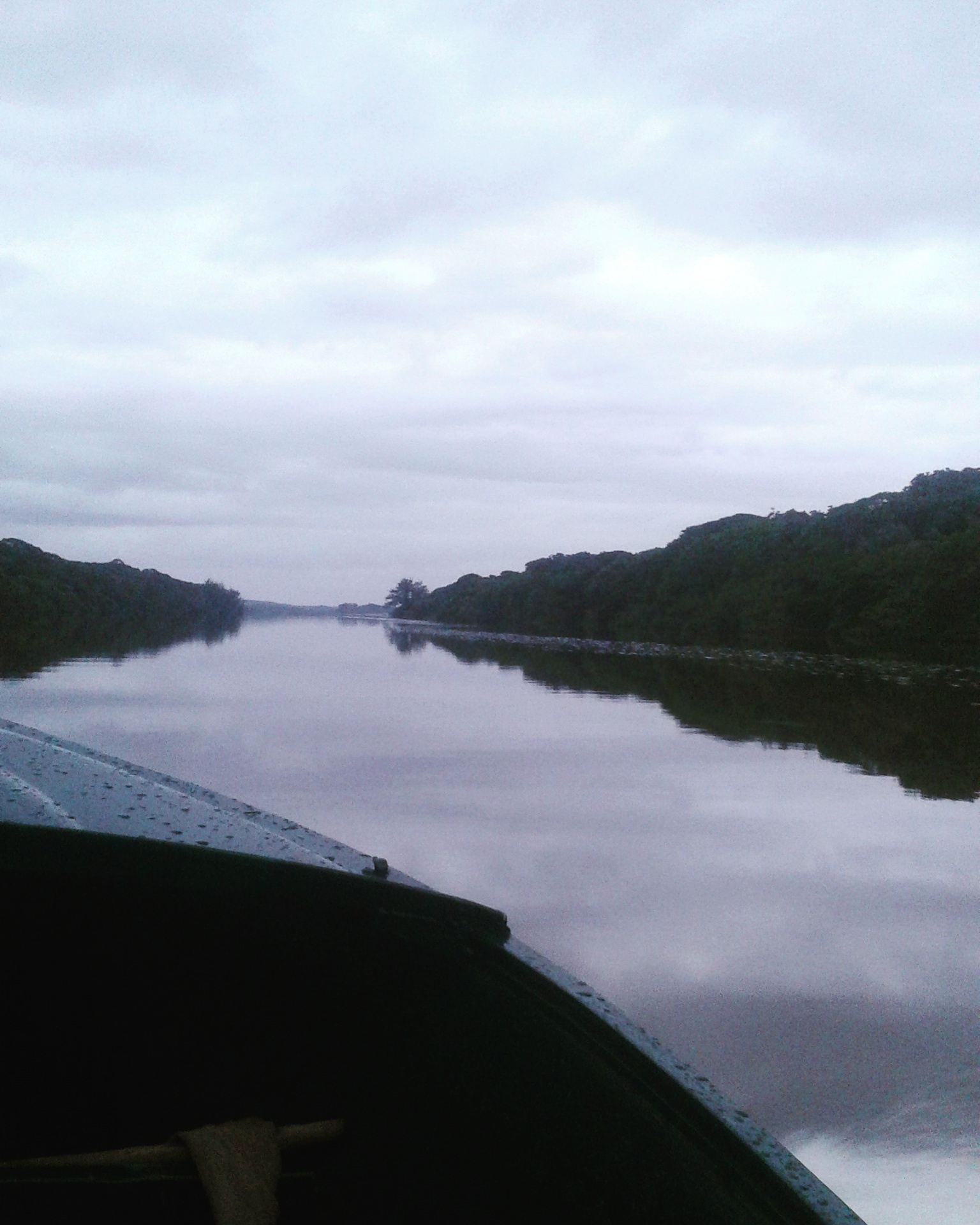
Boat ride at Amatigulu Nature Reserve

aMatikulu is a settlement in Uthungulu District Municipality in the KwaZulu-Natal province of South Africa.

The town is some 130 km north-east of Durban, near Gingindlovu, named after the Matigulu (also spelt Amatikulu) River. The name is derived from the Lala or Zulu phrase meaning "large water" (i.e. "large river") or "large spit", the latter possibly being an anecdotal reference to the periodic flooding of the river.

The approved form is aMatikulu.

== History ==
During the particularly violent flooding during the 1984 tropical storm Domoina, several of the local bridges were destroyed with widespread flooding disrupting much of the local sugar growing and milling operations.

Prior to the current mill, the town was also home to first sugar mill in Zululand, established by J.L Hulett in 1908.

== Industry ==
Located in the heart of the sugar cane growing region of South Africa, the town is home to Amatikulu Sugar Mill, one of three owned by the South African agricultural group Tongaat Hulett.

The town is also located on the main trunk railway line connecting the ports of Durban and Richards Bay. The areas surrounding the town are rich in natural fauna and flora with the Ezemvelo Amatikulu Nature Reserve located approximately 10 km from the town, at the Amatikulu River mouth.

The town was also known for its commercial shrimp farming operation which operated from 1989 - 2004.
