= Percy Herbert Bonnet =

Australian surveyor

- Born: July 25, 1896; Bundaberg, Queensland, Australia
- Died: October 11, 1987 (aged 91); Queensland, Australia
- Occupation: Surveyor

Percy Herbert Bonnet (25 July 1896 - 11 October 1987) was an Australian surveyor who served as the seventh Surveyor-General of the Federated Malay States, from 1945 to 1949.

Percy Herbert Bonnet was born on 25 July 1896 in Bundaberg, Queensland, the son of Francois Michel Ivanoe Bonnet and Sarah Elizabeth née Caset. He was enlisted in the First Australian Imperial Force for service abroad on 29 January 1916, at age 19. He was a surveyor apprentice for three years.

He was appointed the District Surveyor of Seremban (Negeri Sembilan Revenue Survey Branch) on 8 September 1923 and subsequently transferred to Selangor Revenue Survey Branch on 23 January 1924.

He then worked as surveyor in Johore in 1926 and as assistant Superintendent of Survey Kulim, Kedah in 1934.

Bonnet was appointed the Surveyor-General of the Federated Malay States on 25 September 1945, retiring from office on 28 September 1949.

He died on 11 October 1987 in Queensland, Australia.
