= Francis Dent =

British railway manager

Sir Francis Henry Dent, CVO (31 December 1866 – 4 June 1955) was a British railway manager. He was the son of Admiral C.B.C. Dent. He was General Manager of the SE&CR 1911–1920. He was knighted in 1916 and appointed as Commander of the Royal Victorian Order in 1920. Sir Francis was also a keen yachtsman, and owned a West Solent One Design yacht.

== Family ==
Francis Dent married Helen Janet Morten, daughter of James Morten and Maria Skinner, in 1902 at Denham, Buckinghamshire, England. Helen died in 1920 and Dent married Winifred Grace Culling Fremantle, daughter of William Archibald Culling Fremantle and Grace Eleanor Burrows, on 10 November 1923.

== Sources ==
- "Francis Dent". Who's Who.
- "RAILWAY STUDY ASSOCIATION 1909 to 2009 Short biographies of the PRESIDENTS OF THE ASSOCIATION" (PDF). Mike Horne.
