= Henry French (civil servant) =

Sir Henry Leon French, GBE, KCB (30 December 1883 – 3 April 1966) was an English civil servant.

Born on 30 December 1883, he studied at King's College London before entering the civil service in 1901 as a clerk in the Board of Agriculture. He was promoted to the first division in 1909. During the First World War, he was secretary to the Committee on Home Food Production and the Committee on Agricultural Policy. In 1917, he was appointed General Secretary of the Board's Food Production Department, serving until 1919. When the board was re-established as the Ministry of Agriculture and Fisheries in 1920, he was appointed assistant secretary. Promoted to second secretary in 1934, he was seconded to the Board of Trade in 1936 as Director of the Food (Defence Plans) Department.

French was appointed Permanent Secretary of the new Ministry of Food in 1939, serving for the duration of the Second World War (until 1945). He was instrumental in the ministry's successful food policies (including rationing) during the war (as well as the pre-war planning at the Board of Trade) and helped to smoothen relations between his new and former ministries in the early stages of the war. He was, however, regarded as inflexible in some aspects of administration. After earlier state honours, he was appointed a Knight Commander of the Order of the British Empire (KBE) in 1938, and promoted to Grand Cross (GBE) in 1946; he was also appointed a Knight Commander of the Order of the Bath (KCB) in 1942. Retiring in 1946, he was Director-General of the British Film Producers Association from then to 1957 and was involved in planning the Festival Gardens for the Festival of Britain in 1951. He died on 3 April 1966.
