= Victor Alexander Lowinger =

British surveyor

Victor Alexander Lowinger CBE (26 January 1879 – 9 August 1957) was a British surveyor who served as the fourth Surveyor-General of the Federated Malay States, from 1922 to 1933.

== Biography ==
Victor Alexander Lowinger was born on 26 January 1879 in London, the son of Charles Lowinger, a civil engineer. In 1890, at the age of eleven, his family moved to South Africa, where he received his education at Pietermaritzburg, Natal and at the South African College, Cape Town. He worked at the Royal Observatory in Cape Town, under the supervision of Sir David Gill, from 1895 to 1904. He qualified as a land surveyor in 1901 at the Cape and in 1902 in the Transvaal, for the next two years, 1904 to 1906, he worked in the survey department of the Transvaal and Orange River Colony, as their expert in trigonometry.

In 1906 he travelled to Malaya, joining the Survey Department. In 1912 he took charge of the Trigonometrical Branch of the Survey Department. He was appointed the Surveyor-General of the Federated Malay States on 27 July 1922, retiring from office on 4 June 1933.

He was granted a Commander of the British Empire in the 1932 New Year Honours, for his services as Surveyor-General in the Federated Malay States and Straits Settlement.

Following his retirement he took up the role of the Malayan Agent in London, relinquishing the position on 20 December 1939. Lowinger also held positions on the International Tin Committee, International Tin Research Committee, International Rubber Regulation Committee, and the Perak River Hydro-Electric Power Company.

He died on 9 August 1957 in Kensington, England.
