= Hugh Milbourne Jackson =

British military officer

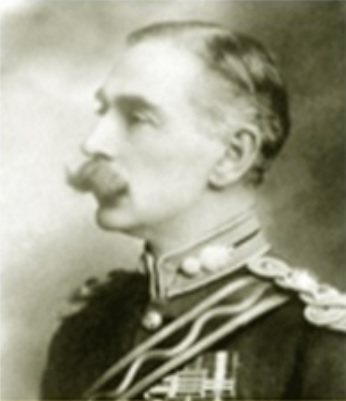
Hugh Milbourne Jackson

Colonel Hugh Milbourne Jackson (27 March 1858 – 9 January 1940) was a British military officer and surveyor, who served as the Surveyor-General of the Transvaal Colony from 1903 to 1905, and the first Surveyor-General of the Federated Malay States, from 1908 to 1915.

Hugh Milbourne Jackson was born 27 March 1858 in Kingston upon Hull, the eldest of four children and only son of Robert Milbourne Jackson (1819–1883), a captain in the Royal Navy, and Caroline Mary née Cattley (1824–1903). He was educated privately and at graduated from the University College London in January 1875. He then went onto study at the Royal Military Academy, Woolwich, and in June 1877 was commissioned as a lieutenant with the Royal Engineers. Jackson served in Bengal from 1881 to 1883 and participated in the survey of India from 1883 to 1894. Returning to England he worked at the Ordnance Survey from 1894 to 1899. In the latter year he was sent to South Africa to participate in the Second Boer War, serving as head of topography of the Field Intelligence Department. He was awarded two medals with six clasps and attained the rank of lieutenant-colonel. In addition to various reports on his work in 1906 he published a paper on "The Employment of Survey Sections in War" in the Royal Engineers Journal.

In 1902 Jackson served as acting president of the Natal Boundary Commission. In March 1903, he was appointed Surveyor-General of the Transvaal Colony, succeeding William Heathcoate Gilfillan. He started publication of the Transvaal degree sheets, on a scale of 1 [English] inch = 1000 Cape roods (1:148 752), the last of which appeared in 1909. These maps were partly based on the rough military maps he had compiled during the war. In March 1904 he attended a geodetic congress in Cape Town at which the further geodetic survey of South Africa was planned. The next year he issued a pamphlet, Memoranda for the use of the plane-table (Pretoria, 1905). He also served as a member of the first Legislative Council of the Transvaal Colony.

In 1905 Jackson returned to the Ordnance Survey in England for a further three years before he was appointed as the first Surveyor-General of the Federated Malay States. He assumed the role on 25 September 1908 taking charge of the Federated Malay States Survey Department and on 1 January 1909 this was expanded to include the Straits Settlement Survey Departments of Penang, Malacca and Singapore, as well as the Trigonometrical Survey Department. He remained the Surveyor-General until 1915. During World War I he commanded a battalion of Royal Engineers in France and was awarded three medals. He retired from service on 7 March 1919.

== Personal life ==
Jackson married Margaret Edith Maitland Courtney (1870–1943) on 5 December 1893 at St Jude's Church, Egham. They had three children, a daughter and two sons: Cicely Milbourne (1896–1952); Edward Hugo (1900–1972); and Quentin Milbourne (1905–1943).

He died at Limpsfield, Surrey on 9 January 1940, at the age of 82.

== See also ==
- Surveyor General of Malaysia
