= List of knights and dames commander of the Order of the British Empire appointed in 1919 and 1920 =

The Order of the British Empire is a British order of chivalry. Established on 4 June 1917 to recognise civilian contributions to the British war effort during the First World War, it was expanded to include a military division at the end of 1918. While continuing to recognise achievement and service in the military, it has since become the main state honour for recognising achievements in public life in the United Kingdom. The order has had five grades since its inception. The top two, Knight or Dame Grand Cross (the most senior) and Knight or Dame Commander, confer the style of knighthood (for men) or damehood (for women) upon the recipient. The following is a list of knights and dames commander appointed from the beginning of 1919 to the end of 1920; at least 311 people were given the honour in this period, many for services relating to the war effort.

== List of knights and dames commander of the Order of the British Empire ==
Date	Name	Notes	Division	Ref.
1 January 1919	Temporary Colonel Sir Almroth Edward Wright, CB, MD, FRCSI, FRS	"For valuable services rendered in connection with military operations in France and Flanders".	M	
1 January 1919	Major-General Rt Hon. Lovick Barnsby Friend, CB	"For valuable services rendered in connection with military operations in France and Flanders".	M	
1 January 1919	Colonel (temporary Major-General) Samuel Hickson, CB, MB	"For valuable services rendered in connection with military operations in France and Flanders".	M	
1 January 1919	Honorary Lieutenant-Colonel (temporary Brigadier-General) Henry Worth Thornton	"For valuable services rendered in connection with the War".	M	
1 January 1919	Major (temporary Colonel) George McLaren Brown	"For valuable services rendered in connection with the War".	M	
1 January 1919	Temporary Honorary Colonel John Lynn Thomas, CB, CMG, FRCS	"For valuable services rendered in connection with the War".	M	
1 January 1919	Colonel Harry Edwin Bruce Bruce-Porter, CMG	"For valuable services rendered in connection with the War".	M	
1 January 1919	Florence Edith Victoria Leach, CBE	Controller-in-Chief, QMAAC. "For valuable services rendered in connection with the War".	M	
1 January 1919	Admiral Robert Nelson Ommanney, CB	"For valuable services rendered in connection with the War".	M	
1 January 1919	Rear-Admiral Edward Fitzmaurice Inglefield, CBE	"For valuable services rendered in connection with the War".	M	
1 January 1919	Rear-Admiral Edmund Radcliffe Pears, CB	"For valuable services rendered in connection with the War".	M	
1 January 1919	Francis Theodore Boys	Principal Director of Meat Supplies, Ministry of Food. "For valuable services rendered in connection with the War".	C	
1 January 1919	Cecil Lindsay Budd, CBE	Member of Non-ferrous Materials Department, Ministry of Munitions; Chairman of the Copper Committee and British Representative on the Inter-Allied Non-Ferrous Materials Committee. "For valuable services rendered in connection with the War".	C	
1 January 1919	Edward Napier Burnett, JP, MD, FRCS, FRCP	Chairman of the Economic Committee of the Army Medical Department, War Office. "For valuable services rendered in connection with the War".	C	
1 January 1919	Geoffrey Butler, CBE	Director of the British Bureau of Information, USA. "For valuable services rendered in connection with the War".	C	
1 January 1919	James Carmichael, JP	Chairman of the Munition Works Board and of the Building Materials Supply Committee; Member of the Surplus Government Property Disposal Board. "For valuable services rendered in connection with the War".	C	
1 January 1919	Thomas Clement	Chairman of the Cheese and Butter Import Committee, Ministry of Food. "For valuable services rendered in connection with the War".	C	
1 January 1919	Sir Clement Kinloch-Cooke, MP	For valuable services rendered in connection with the War.	C	
1 January 1919	Major Algernon Tudor Craig, CBE	Secretary, Incorporated Soldiers' and Sailors' Help Society. "For valuable services rendered in connection with the War".	C	
1 January 1919	Richard James Curtis	Food Commissioner for the Midland Division. "For valuable services rendered in connection with the War".	C	
1 January 1919	Percy Daniels	Head of Leather Purchasing Commission, British War Mission in U.S.A. "For valuable services rendered in connection with the War".	C	
1 January 1919	Sir Alfred Eyles, KCB	Formerly Accountant-General of the Navy. "For valuable services rendered in connection with the War".	C	
1 January 1919	Herbert Gibson	Wheat Commissioner for the Royal Commission on Wheat Supplies in Argentina and Uruguay. "For valuable services rendered in connection with the War".	C	
1 January 1919	Sir Frederick Green	Of the League of Mercy. "For valuable services rendered in connection with the War".	C	
1 January 1919	Sir Henry Rider Haggard	Member of the Dominions Royal Commission and of the Empire Settlement Committee. "For valuable services rendered in connection with the War".	C	
1 January 1919	Laurence Edward Halsey	Honorary Accountant, Prince of Wales's National Relief Fund. "For valuable services rendered in connection with the War".	C	
1 January 1919	William John Jones, CBE	Member of Iron and Steel Production Department, Ministry of Munitions. "For valuable services rendered in connection with the War".	C	
1 January 1919	John McKie Lees, KC	Sheriff of Forfarshire and Convener of the Sheriffs of Scotland. "For valuable services rendered in connection with the War".	C	
1 January 1919	Norman Alexander Leslie, CBE	Transport Department, Ministry of Shipping; Organiser of British and Allied Shipping in connection with the convoy system. "For valuable services rendered in connection with the War".	C	
1 January 1919	Alexander Mackenzie	"For valuable services rendered in connection with the War".	C	
1 January 1919	John McLaren, JP	Chairman Board of Control, National Ordnance Factories, Leeds, Ministry of Munitions; Chairman of Messrs. J. & H. McLaren, Midland Engine Works, Leeds. "For valuable services rendered in connection with the War".	C	
1 January 1919	Henry McLaughlin	Member of the Irish Recruiting Council. "For valuable services rendered in connection with the War".	C	
1 January 1919	Lieutenant-Colonel John Herbert Mansell, DL	Managing Director, Coventry Ordnance Works. "For valuable services rendered in connection with the War".	C	
1 January 1919	Captain William Maxwell	"For valuable services rendered in connection with the War."	C	
1 January 1919	George Douglas Cochrane Newton	Assistant Secretary (unpaid), Rural Reconstruction Department, Ministry of Reconstruction. "For valuable services rendered in connection with the War".	C	
1 January 1919	Bernard Pares	Professor of Russian, University of London. "For valuable services rendered in connection with the War".	C	
1 January 1919	John Pedder, CB	Assistant Secretary, Home Office; Member of the Central Control Board (Liquor Traffic). "For valuable services rendered in connection with the War".	C	
1 January 1919	His Honour Judge George Bettesworth Piggott, CBE	Chairman of Special Military Service Tribunal for London and Deputy Chairman of the House of Commons Section of the Appeal Tribunal for London. "For valuable services rendered in connection with the War".	C	
1 January 1919	Colonel Thomas Andrew Polson, CMG	Chief Inspector of Clothing, Royal Army Clothing Department. "For valuable services rendered in connection with the War".	C	
1 January 1919	William Jackson Pope, CBE, FRS, DSc, LLD	Member of the Chemical Warfare Committee, Ministry of Munitions; Professor of Chemistry, Cambridge University. "For valuable services rendered in connection with the War".	C	
1 January 1919	George Archdall O'Brien Reid, MB, CM	"For valuable services rendered in connection with the War".	C	
1 January 1919	Brevet Lieutenant-Colonel Thomas Duncan Rhind, CBE, TD	Chief Recorder, Ministry of National Service. "For valuable services rendered in connection with the War".	C	
1 January 1919	Ashley Sparks	Director-General of British Ministry of Shipping in U.S.A. "For valuable services rendered in connection with the War".	C	
1 January 1919	Commander Guy Standing, CBE, RNVR	British War Mission to U.S.A. "For valuable services rendered in connection with the War".	C	
1 January 1919	Aubrey Strahan, FRS, ScD, LLD	Director of the Geological Survey of Great Britain and of the Geological Museum. "For valuable services rendered in connection with the War".	C	
1 January 1919	William Thorn	Chairman, Blackburn Board of Management, Ministry of Munitions; Member of the Engineering Trades (New Industries) Committee of the Ministry of Reconstruction; Director of Messrs. Yates & Thorn, Ltd.	C	
1 January 1919	James Howard Warrack	Member of the Admiralty Transport Arbitration Board; ex-President of the Chamber of Shipping of the United Kingdom. "For valuable services rendered in connection with the War".	C	
1 January 1919	William Alfred Waterlow	Managing Director of Messrs. Waterlow Bros & Layton. "For valuable services rendered in connection with the War".	C	
1 January 1919	Arthur Francis Whinney	Adviser on Costs of Production, Admiralty. "For valuable services rendered in connection with the War".	C	
1 January 1919	Colonel William Hale White, MD, RAMC	Chairman and Consultant, Queen Mary's Royal Naval Hospital, Southend. "For valuable services rendered in connection with the War".	C	
1 January 1919	Arthur Willert	Correspondent of The Times at Washington; formerly Secretary of the British War Mission in Washington. "For valuable services rendered in connection with the War".	C	
1 January 1919	John Bowring Wimble	Chairman of London Shipowners' and Transport Workers' Military Service Committee. "For valuable services rendered in connection with the War".	C	
1 January 1919	James Williams Woods	Director of Purchases, British War Mission in U.S.A. "For valuable services rendered in connection with the War".	C	
1 January 1919	John Wormald	Chairman of the General Service and Industries Committees, War Priorities Committee; Managing Director, Messrs Mather and Platt.	C	
1 January 1919	Albert William Wyon	Senior Partner, Messrs Price, Waterhouse & Co.; Government Accountant of Controlled Canals.	C	
1 January 1919	Lieutenant-Colonel Hector Travers Dennys, CIE	Indian Army, Inspector-General of Police, Punjab.	C	
1 January 1919	Sir Stanley Reed	Vice-President, Central Publicity Board.	C	
1 January 1919	Sir Henry George Richards, KC	Chief Justice of the High Court of Allahabad	C	
1 January 1919	Lieutenant-Colonel James Wishart Thomson	Agent to the Shipping Controller in India	C	
1 January 1919	Colonel Edgar Edwin Bernard, CMG	Financial Secretary of the Sudan Government.	C	
1 January 1919	Rachel Eleanor Crowdy, RRC	Principal Commandant, VADs in France.	C	
1 January 1919	Henrietta Caroline, Lady Henderson		C	
1 January 1919	Lady Blanche Gordon Lennox	Director of HRH Princess Victoria's Rest Clubs for Nurses.	C	
1 January 1919	Giana Stephen, Baroness Mount Stephen	Queen Mary's Needlework Guild.	C	
1 January 1919	William Ewen Stavert	Financial Controller, Ministry of Information	C	
1 January 1919	Eric Hambro	Ministry of Information.	C	
1 April 1919	Rear-Admiral Sir William Rooke Cresswell, KCMG	"For valuable services as First Naval Member of the Australian Commonwealth Naval Board".	M	
1 April 1919	Surgeon Rear-Admiral George Robertson Turner, CB, FRCS.	"For valuable services as Consultant Surgeon, Royal Naval Hospital, Plymouth".	M	
3 June 1919	Commandant Helen Charlotte Isabella Gwynne-Vaughan, CBE		M	
3 June 1919	Rear-Admiral Charles Lionel Vaughan-Lee, CB	"For services in connection with the war".	M	
3 June 1919	Surgeon Rear-Admiral William Wenmoth Pryn, CB	"For services in connection with the war".	M	
3 June 1919	Surgeon Rear-Admiral Patrick Brodie Handyside, CB, MB	"For services in connection with the war".	M	
3 June 1919	Captain (Commodore, 2nd Class) Herbert Edward Purey Cost, CB, CBE, RNR (Admiral, retired)	"For services in connection with the war".	M	
3 June 1919	Surgeon Captain Daniel Joseph Patrick McNabb, CB, RN	"For services in connection with the war".	M	
3 June 1919	Surgeon Captain Arthur Stanley Nance, CB, RN	"For services in connection with the war".	M	
3 June 1919	Paymaster Captain Francis Cooke Alton, CB, CMG, RN	"For services in connection with the war".	M	
3 June 1919	Nawab Sir Bahrain Khan, KCIE	Mazari of the Dera Ghazi Khan District, Member of the Legislative Council of the Punjab. "For services in connection with the war".	C	
3 June 1919	Raja Daljit Singh, CSI	Chief Minister Jammu and Kashmir State. "For services in connection with the war".	C	
3 June 1919	Lieutenant-Colonel Sardar Appaji Rao Sitole, CIE	Amir-ul-Umra, Member of the Majlis-i-Khas, Gwalior State, Central India. "For services in connection with the war".	C	
3 June 1919	The Honourable Mary, Lady Monro	"For services in connection with the war".	C	
3 June 1919	Una, Lady O'Dwyer, CBE	"For services in connection with the war".	C	
3 June 1919	Colonel (temporary Brigadier-General) Valentine Murray, CB, CMG	"For services in connection with military operations in France and Flanders".	M	
3 June 1919	Major (temporary Colonel) Hamilton Ashley Ballance, CB, MD, FRCS	"For services in connection with military operations in France and Flanders".	M	
3 June 1919	Colonel Robert Hammill Firth, CB, FRCS	"For services in connection with military operations in France and Flanders".	M	
3 June 1919	Major-General Sir Arthur Wigram Money, KCB, CSI	"For valuable services rendered in connection with military operations in Egypt".	M	
3 June 1919	Colonel (temporary Major-General) Sir Robert Whyte Melville Jackson, KCMG, CB	"For valuable services rendered in connection with military operations in Egypt".	M	
3 June 1919	Colonel (temporary Major-General) Harry Davis Watson, CB, CMG, CIE, MVO	"For valuable services rendered in connection with military operations in Egypt".	M	
3 June 1919	Lieutenant-Colonel and Brevet Colonel (T./Brig.-Gen.) Michael Graham Egerton Bowman-Manifold, CB, CMG, DSO	"For valuable services rendered in connection with military operations in Egypt".	M	
3 June 1919	Major and Brevet Colonel (temporary Brigadier-General) Gilbert Falkingham Clayton, CB, CMG	"For valuable services rendered in connection with military operations in Egypt".	M	
3 June 1919	Sarah Elizabeth Oram, RRC	Principal Matron (temporary Matron-in-Chief), QAIMNS. "For valuable services rendered in connection with military operations in Egypt".	M	
3 June 1919	Temporary Colonel Charles Gordon Watson, CMG, FRCS	"For valuable services rendered in connection with military operations in Italy".	M	
3 June 1919	Colonel (temporary Brigadier-General) Arthur Long, CB, CMG, DSO	"For valuable services rendered in connection with military operations in the Balkans".	M	
3 June 1919	Colonel (temporary Brigadier-General) Hugh David White Thomson, CB, CMG, DSO	"For valuable services rendered in connection with military operations in the Balkans".	M	
3 June 1919	Lieutenant-Colonel (Brevet Colonel and temporary Brigadier-General) Arthur William Forbes, CB	"For valuable services rendered in connection with the war".	M	
3 June 1919	Colonel (temporary Brigadier-General), Francis James Anderson, CB	"For valuable services rendered in connection with the war".	M	
3 June 1919	Colonel (temporary Brigadier-General) Edward Hamilton Seymour, CB, CMG	"For valuable services rendered in connection with the war".	M	
3 June 1919	Colonel Arthur Robert Dick, CB, CVO	"For valuable services rendered in connection with the war".	M	
3 June 1919	Colonel (temporary Major-General) Dudley Howard Ridout, CB, CMG	"For valuable services rendered in connection with the war".	M	
3 June 1919	Major-General Hon. Charles John Sackville-West, CMG	"For valuable services rendered in connection with the war".	M	
3 June 1919	Lieutenant-Colonel and Brevet Colonel (temporary Major-General) Frederick Cuthbert Poole, CB, CMG, DSO	"For valuable services rendered in connection with the war".	M	
3 June 1919	Colonel (temporary Major-General) George Bradshaw Stanistreet, CB, CMG, MB	"For valuable services rendered in connection with the war".	M	
3 June 1919	Lieutenant-Colonel (temporary Colonel) Henry Davy, CB, MD	"For valuable services rendered in connection with the war".	M	
3 June 1919	Lieutenant-Colonel and Brevet Colonel German Sims Woodhead, OBE	"For valuable services rendered in connection with the war".	M	
3 June 1919	Lieutenant-Colonel Sir Shirley Forster Murphy, FRCS	"For valuable services rendered in connection with the war".	M	
3 June 1919	Lieutenant-Colonel D'Arcy Power, MB, FRCS	"For valuable services rendered in connection with the war".	M	
3 June 1919	Temporary Lieutenant-Colonel James Leigh Wood, CB, CMG	"For valuable services rendered in connection with the war".	M	
3 June 1919	Major (temporary Lieutenant-Colonel) Henry Mcllree Williamson Gray, CB, CMG, MB, FRCS	"For valuable services rendered in connection with the war".	M	
3 June 1919	Major (temporary Lieutenant-Colonel) Sir Arthur William Mayo-Robson, CB, CVO, FRCS	"For valuable services rendered in connection with the war".	M	
3 June 1919	Major (temporary Colonel) Charters James Symonds, CB, M.D., FRCS	"For valuable services rendered in connection with the war".	M	
3 June 1919	Major and Brevet Lieutenant-Colonel Frederick Walker Mott, MD, FRCP, FRS	"For valuable services rendered in connection with the war".	M	
3 June 1919	Major (temporary Major-Gen.) Sir Robert Jones, CB, FRCS	"For valuable services rendered in connection with the war".	M	
3 June 1919	Captain (temporary Lieutenant-Colonel) Archibald Douglas Reid, CMG	"For valuable services rendered in connection with the war".	M	
3 June 1919	Lieutenant-General Sir Herbert Eversley Belfield, KCB, KCMG, DSO	"For valuable services rendered in connection with the war".	M	
3 June 1919	Colonel and Honorary Major-General (temporary Major-General) Francis George Bond, CB, CMG	"For valuable services rendered in connection with the war".	M	
3 June 1919	Colonel (Honorary Brigadier-General) Robert Calverley Alington Bowicke-Copley, CB	"For valuable services rendered in connection with the war".	M	
3 June 1919	Colonel Robert Megaw Ireland, CB, CMG	"For valuable services rendered in connection with the war".	M	
3 June 1919	Colonel (temporary Brigadier-General) George William Hacket Pain, CB	"For valuable services rendered in connection with the war".	M	
3 June 1919	Lieutenant-Colonel (Honorary Brigadier-General) Sir Edward Raban, KCB	"For valuable services rendered in connection with the war".	M	
3 June 1919	Lieutenant-Colonel and Brevet Colonel (temporary Brigadier-General) Arthur Granville Balfour, CB	"For valuable services rendered in connection with the war".	M	
3 June 1919	Lieutenant-Colonel and Brevet Colonel (temporary Brigadier-General) Hill Godfrey Morgan, CB, CMG, DSO	"For valuable services rendered in connection with the war".	M	
3 June 1919	Major & Brevet Lieutenant-Colonel Lord Arthur Howe Browne	"For valuable services rendered in connection with the war".	M	
3 June 1919	Major & Brevet Lieutenant-Colonel (temporary Colonel) Vernon George Waldegrave Kell, CB	"For valuable services rendered in connection with the war".	M	
3 June 1919	Lieutenant-Colonel (Honorary Colonel) Robert William Edis, CB	"For valuable services rendered in connection with the war".	M	
3 June 1919	Colonel Robert Campbell MacKenzie, CB	"For valuable services rendered in connection with the war".	M	
3 June 1919	Colonel Herbrand Arthur, The Duke of Bedford, KG, ADC	"For valuable services rendered in connection with the war".	M	
3 June 1919	Colonel (Honorary Surgeon-General) Charles Snodgrass Ryan, CB, CMG	"For valuable services rendered in connection with the war".	M	
3 June 1919	Major-General The Hon. Sir James Whiteside McCay, KCMG, CB	"For valuable services rendered in connection with the war".	M	
3 June 1919	Alice, Lady Northcote		C	
3 June 1919	Florence Rose, Countess of Darnley		C	
3 June 1919	William Dingwall Mitchell Cotts	"For services in connection with recruiting".	C	
3 June 1919	Colonel Henry Walter Hamilton Fowle, CBE	Commissioner of Enemy Subjects and Custodian of Enemy Property.	C	
3 June 1919	Harry Hands	Formerly Mayor of Cape Town. "For services in connection with recruiting and other war work".	C	
3 June 1919	Senator Colonel Hon. Walter Ernest Mortimer Stanford, CB, CMG, OBE	Director of War Recruiting and Commissioner for Returned Soldiers.	C	
3 June 1919	The Honourable John Chalker Crosbie	Minister of Shipping, Chairman of the Tonnage Committee (Newfoundland).	C	
3 June 1919	Charles Calvert Bowring, CMG	Chief Secretary to the Government, East Africa Protectorate. "For services as President of the War Council and Acting Governor of the Protectorate".	C	
3 June 1919	Francis Charles Bernard Dudley Fuller, CMG	Chief Commissioner, Ashanti.	C	
3 June 1919	Lieutenant-Colonel Raleigh Grey, CMG, CVO	Member of the Legislative Council of Southern Rhodesia.	C	
3 June 1919	Sir Henry Francis Wilson, KCMG	Secretary, Royal Colonial Institute, Member of the Empire Land Settlement Committee and War Services Committee.	C	
3 June 1919	William Douglas Young, CMG	Governor and Commander-in-Chief of the Falkland Islands	C	
3 June 1919	Mabel Danvers, Countess of Harrowby	"For services in connection with the entertainment of Officers of the Overseas Forces".	C	
3 June 1919	Colonel (temporary Brigadier-General) Herbert William Wilberforce, CB, CMG	"For valuable services rendered in connection with military operations in France and Flanders".	M	
3 June 1919	Major (temporary Brigadier-General) Sir George Bohun Macauley, KCMG, CB, CBE	"For valuable services rendered in connection with military operations in Egypt".	M	
3 June 1919	Major-General Edward Charles William Mackenzie-Kennedy, CB	"For valuable services rendered in connection with military operations in the Balkans".	M	
3 June 1919	Colonel (temporary Brigadier-General) Walter Charteris Ross, CB, CMG	"For valuable services rendered in connection with military operations in the Balkans".	M	
3 June 1919	Colonel Walter Coote Hedley, CB, CMG	"For valuable services rendered in connection with the war".	M	
3 June 1919	Colonel and Honorary Brigadier-General Thomas Heron, CB, CBE	"For valuable services rendered in connection with the war".	M	
3 June 1919	Captain and Brevet Lieutenant-Colonel (temporary Colonel) Sir Harold Jalland Stiles, MB, FRCS	"For valuable services rendered in connection with the war".	M	
3 June 1919	Lieutenant-Colonel William Thorburn, CB, CMG, MD, FRCS	"For valuable services rendered in connection with the war".	M	
3 June 1919	Colonel (temporary Brigadier-General) Hon. Henry Yarde-Buller, CB, DSO, MVO	"For valuable services rendered in connection with the war".	M	
3 June 1919	Lieutenant-Colonel Edward Newbury Thornton, CBE	"For valuable services rendered in connection with the war".	M	
27 June 1919	Captain John William Alcock, DSC	"In recognition of distinguished service to Aviation, in connection with the successful flight from St John's, Newfoundland, to Clifden, Co. Galway, on 14th-15th June, 1919".	C	
27 June 1919	Lieutenant Arthur Whitten Brown	"In recognition of distinguished service to Aviation, in connection with the successful flight from St John's, Newfoundland, to Clifden, Co. Galway, on 14th-15th June, 1919".	C	
5 December 1919	Frederick Terry Rowlatt	Governor of the National Bank of Egypt	C	
5 December 1919	Colonel Herbert William Jackson, CB	Acting Governor-Generial of the Sudan	C	
26 December 1919	Captain Ross Macpherson Smith, MC, DFC, AFC	"In recognition of the valuable services rendered to Aviation by the recent successful flight from England to Australia".	C	
26 December 1919	Lieutenant Keith Macpherson Smith	"In recognition of the valuable services rendered to Aviation by the recent successful flight from England to Australia".	C	
30 December 1919	Francis Dundas Couchman, CIE	Member, Railway Board (India). "In recognition of valuable services rendered in India in connection with the War".	C	
30 December 1919	George Sankey Hart, CIE	Imperial Forest Service. Inspector-General of Forests (India).	C	
30 December 1919	Diwan Bahadur Day a Kishan Kaul, CIE	Foreign and Financial Secretary, Patiala State, Punjab.	C	
30 December 1919	Sir Alexander McRobert	Managing Director, Woollen Mills, Cawnpore, United Provinces. "In recognition of valuable services rendered in India in connection with the War".	C	
1 January 1920	Rear-Admiral Harry Hampson Stileman, CBE		M	
1 January 1920	Rear-Admiral Edward Henry Fitzhardinge Heaton-Ellis, CB, CBE, MVO		M	
1 January 1920	Sir Ernest Frederick George Hatch, Baronet	Chairman of Council, "Beyond Seas" Association for the Reception of Officers and Relatives from Beyond the Seas.	C	
1 January 1920	The Honourable Robert Heaton Rhodes	"For services as New Zealand Red Cross Commissioner in England, and in connection with the welfare of the troops of the Dominion".	C	
1 January 1920	Captain Harry Vesey Brooke, JP, DL	Chairman of Aberdeenshire and District Local Emergency Committee. "For services in connection with the War".	C	
23 February 1920	Temporary Major-General Fabian Arthur Goulstone Ware, CB, CMG	"For valuable services rendered throughout the War as Director-General, Graves Registration and Enquiries".	M	
3 March 1920	Temporary Honorary Major Auguste Charles Valadier, CMG	For "valuable services rendered in connection with military operations in France and Flanders".	M	
1 January 1920	Alice Chisholm, CBE	Voluntary worker, Soldiers' Club and Rest Camp, Kantara West. "For services in connection with the War".	C	
1 January 1920	Janet Lucretia, Dowager Countess of Eglinton and Winton, LLD	President, Ayrshire Branch, British Red Cross Society. "For services in connection with the War".	C	
1 January 1920	Louise Beatrice Augusta, Countess of Gosford	President of the Central Workrooms, British Red Cross Society. "For services in connection with the War".	C	
1 January 1920	Una Constance Pope-Hennessy	Central Prisoners of War Committee, British Red Cross Society. "For services in connection with the War".	C	
1 January 1920	Catherine Reeve Hunt	Chairman of the Sailors' and Soldiers' Families.' Association and Honorary Secretary of the Local Wax Pensions Committee, Colchester. "For services in connection with the War".	C	
1 January 1920	Alice Emily, Countess of Leicester	President, Norfolk Branch, British Red Cross Society. "For services in connection with the War".	C	
1 January 1920	Isabel Charlotte, Baroness Talbot de Malahide	President, County of Dublin Branch of the British; Red Cross Society, and of the Irish Joint Red Cross and St John Executive Committee. "For services in connection with the War".	C	
1 January 1920	Beryl Carnegy, Lady Oliver, CBE, RRC	Head of the Naval and Military VAD Department, Devonshire House. "For services in connection with the War".	C	
1 January 1920	Sybil Margaret, Dowager Viscountess Rhondda	Chairman of Women's Advisory Committee of National War Savings Committee. "For services in connection with the War".	C	
1 January 1920	Clara Butt-Rumford	For ungrudging and patriotic service during the war. "For services in connection with the War".	C	
1 January 1920	Louise Victoria Samuel, OBE	One of the founders' of the War Refugees Committee in August 1914. "For services in connection with the War".	C	
1 January 1920	Ethel Mary Reader Shakespear, MBE, DSc	Honorary Secretary, Birmingham War Pensions Committee. "For services in connection with the War".	C	
1 January 1920	Meriel Lucy Talbot, OBE	Director of Women's Branch, Board of Agriculture. "For services in connection with the War".	C	
1 January 1920	Sophia Gertrude Wintz	Superintendent of the Royal Sailors' Rests. "For services in connection with the War".	C	
1 January 1920	Westcott Stile Abell	Chief Surveyor to Lloyd's Register of Shipping. "For services in connection with the War".	C	
1 January 1920	Martin Arnold Abrahamson	Vice-President and Chairman of the British Red Cross Society, Copenhagen Bureau; Commissioner for Repatriation of British Prisoners of War. "For services in connection with the War".	C	
1 January 1920	Patrick Dalreagle Agnew, CBE	Vice-Chairman and Managing Director, Central Prisoners of War Committee. "For services in connection with the War".	C	
1 January 1920	Brigadier-General William Alexander, CB, CMG, DSO, TD	Director-General of Purchases, Ministry of Munitions, and Controller of Aircraft Supply. "For services in connection with the War".	C	
1 January 1920	George Henry Ashdown, CBE, ISO	Director of Stores, Admiralty, and Admiralty Representative on International Petroleum Committee. "For services in connection with the War".	C	
1 January 1920	Henry Walter Badock, CSI	Accountant-General, India Office. "For services in connection with the War".	C	
1 January 1920	Thomas Baker, JP	Formerly Mayor of Plymouth. "For valuable war work".	C	
1 January 1920	Isaac Bayley Balfour, LL.D, MD, DSc, FRS	Professor of Botany, University of Edinburgh, Regius Keeper of Royal Botanic Gardens, Edinburgh. "For services in connection with the War".	C	
1 January 1920	Captain Walter de Mouchet Baynham, RD	Master, SS Ormonde. "For services in connection with the War".	C	
1 January 1920	Lieutenant-Colonel Samuel Henry Egerton Barraclough, CBE	In charge of Australian Munition Workers. "For services in connection with the War".	C	
1 January 1920	James Beattie	In charge of Jute Goods Department and Honorary Director of Flax Office at Dundee, Department of the Surveyor-General of Supply, War Office; Managing Director, Messrs A. and S. Henry and Co. Ltd. "For services in connection with the War".	C	
1 January 1920	Mayson Moss Beeton	"For services in connection with the Newfoundland Forestry Corps" and "services in connection with the War".	C	
1 January 1920	Sir Thomas Henry Devereux Berridge	"For services in connection with the War".	C	
1 January 1920	Walter Wheeler Berry, JP	Development Commissioner; representative of Board of Agriculture on the Hop Control Committee and on other Committees; Member of Agricultural Advisory Council. "For services in connection with the War".	C	
1 January 1920	Arthur Ernest Blake, JP	"For work in connection with War Loan Savings Banks and services on the Nottingham Parliamentary Recruiting Committee and Tribunal".	C	
1 January 1920	William Henry Bragg, CBE, DSc, FRS	Quain Professor of Physics, University of London; Superintendent of Admiralty Experimental Station at Parkston. "For services in connection with the War".	C	
1 January 1920	Harry Samuel Bickerton Brindley	Ministry of Munitions. "For services in connection with the War".	C	
1 January 1920	Herbert Brown	Organiser of the British Farmers' Red Cross Fund. "For services in connection with the War".	C	
1 January 1920	Joseph Burn, CBE	Member of National War Savings Committee. "For services in connection with the War".	C	
1 January 1920	Cyril Kendall Butler, JP	Chief British Representative, Inter-Allied Food and Relief Mission, Vienna. "For services in connection with the War".	C	
1 January 1920	Gordon Huntly Campbell	Chairman, Collections Committee, British Red Cross Society and Order of St John. "For services in connection with the War".	C	
1 January 1920	Frederick William Chance, JP, DL	Chairman, of Committee for State Purchase undertakings in the Carlisle Area. "For services in connection with the War".	C	
1 January 1920	Captain James Thomas Walter Charles, CB, CBE, RD	Royal Navy Reserve. Master, SS Aquitania. "For services in connection with the War".	C	
1 January 1920	Captain Benjamin Chave	Master, SS Carisbrooke Castle. "For services in connection with the War".	C	
1 January 1920	Robert Waley Cohen	Petroleum Adviser to the War Office. "For services in connection with the War".	C	
1 January 1920	Henry Arthur Colefax, KC	"For services rendered in connection with the Ministry of Munitions and Admiralty" and "in connection with the war".	C	
1 January 1920	James Currie, CMG	Director of Training, Ministry of Labour. "For services in connection with the War".	C	
1 January 1920	Stephen Demetriadi	Partner and Managing Director of Messrs Ralla Brothers; Assistant 'Secretary, Special Grants Committee, Ministry of Pensions. "For services in connection with the War".	C	
1 January 1920	Raymond Herbert Dennis	For "services in connection with the supply of motor lorries and fire engines" and "in connection with the war".	C	
1 January 1920	James Lyne Devonshire	Managing Director of London United Tramways Ltd and London and Suburban Electric Traction Co. Ltd. "For services in connection with the War".	C	
1 January 1920	John Dewrance	Member of Engineering Employers' Consultative Committee, Ministry of Munitions; Vice-Chairman, Managing Committee, Engineering Employers' Federation; Chairman, Messrs Babcock and Wilcox Ltd. "For services in connection with the War".	C	
1 January 1920	William Henry Diamond	For "services in South Wales in connection with Recruiting, War Savings, etc."	C	
1 January 1920	Lieutenant-Commander Charles Edward Down, OBE	Royal Naval Reserve. Marine Superintendent, Royal Mail Steam Packet Company. "For services in connection with the War".	C	
1 January 1920	George Keith Buller Elphinstone, OBE	Head of Messrs Elliott Bros, Westminster. For "valuable services in [the] design and manufacture of fire control apparatus for Navy" and "in connection with the war".	C	
1 January 1920	Commander Thomas Fisher, CBE, RN	Representative of Ministry of Shipping in USA. "For services in connection with the War".	C	
1 January 1920	Cecil Edwin Fitch	For "services in connection with [wartime] recruiting".	C	
1 January 1920	Philip Horace Freeman, CBE	Honorary Secretary, Officers' Families' Fund. "For services in connection with the War".	C	
1 January 1920	Major James German, OBE, JP	For "services in connection with recruiting propaganda and war charities".	C	
1 January 1920	Lieutenant-Colonel Walter Gibbons	"Donor of a large number of Red Cross Ambulances to the British and French Authorities; Donor of Willesden Auxiliary Hospital". "For services in connection with the War".	C	
1 January 1920	Philip Hamilton Gibbs	War Correspondent. "For services in connection with the War".	C	
1 January 1920	William Henry Neville Goschen, OBE	"Prominent Member" and Chairman for 1918 of Joint Stock Bankers' Committee. For "valuable services on many Government Committees" and "in connection with the War".	C	
1 January 1920	Major Philip Lloyd-Greame, MC, MP	Conjoint Secretary, Ministry of National Service. "For services in connection with the War".	C	
1 January 1920	Arnold Babb Gridley	For "services as Electrical Adviser to Government Departments" and "in connection with the war".	C	
1 January 1920	Sidney Frederic Harmer, DSc, FRS	Director of Natural History Departments and Keeper of Zoology, British Museum. "For services in connection with the War".	C	
1 January 1920	Austin Edward Harris	Formerly Assistant Survey or-General of Supply, War Office; Chairman of the Contracts Advisory Committee and Contracts Board. "For services in connection with the War".	C	
1 January 1920	Ernest Maes Harvey	Treasury Representative with British Commission to Russia. "For services in connection with the War".	C	
1 January 1920	Walter Risley Hearn	His Majesty's Consul-General in Paris. "For services in connection with the War".	C	
1 January 1920	Sir Cecil Hertslet	His Majesty's Consul-General for Belgium; Chairman of Belgian Trade Committee. "For services in connection with the War".	C	
1 January 1920	Major James William Beeman Hodsdon, CBE, MD, FRCS	Member of Medical Advisory Board, Ministry of National Service. "For services in connection with the War".	C	
1 January 1920	Alan Hutchings, OBE	Secretary of Department of Director-General of Voluntary Organisations. "For services in connection with the War".	C	
1 January 1920	George Lawson Johnston	Member of Leather Control Board, Department of the Surveyor-General of Supply, War Office. "For services in connection with the War".	C	
1 January 1920	Bertram-Hyde Jones	Civil Assistant to Controller-General of Equipment, War Office. "For services in connection with the War".	C	
1 January 1920	Karl Fredrik Knudsen	Representative of Norwegian Shipowners on Neutral Tonnage Conference. "For services in connection with the War".	C	
1 January 1920	Captain George Edward Wickham Legg, MVO	Secretary of the Sailors' and Soldiers' Families' Association. "For services in connection with the War".	C	
1 January 1920	Frederick Lobnitz, DL, JP	Director of Munitions in Scotland. "For services in connection with the War".	C	
1 January 1920	Brigadier-General George Charles, Earl of Lucan, CB	Head of Wounded and Missing Enquiry Department, British Red Cross Society. "For services in connection with the War".	C	
1 January 1920	Thomas Callan Macardle, JP, DL	Chairman of the Louth Recruiting Committee, and pioneer of the Irish Tillage Movement. "For services in connection with the War".	C	
1 January 1920	Frederick Larkins-Macleod, CBE	Adviser on Foreign Iron Ores, Ministry of Munitions. "For services in connection with the War".	C	
1 January 1920	Hon. Malcolm Martin Macnaghten, KC	Director of the Foreign Claims Office. "For services in connection with the War".	C	
1 January 1920	Hector Murray Macneal	For valuable services rendered to the Ministry of Shipping. "For services in connection with the War".	C	
1 January 1920	Alfred Mansfield, CBE	Director of Oils and Fats, Ministry of Food. "For services in connection with the War".	C	
1 January 1920	Basil Edgar Mayhew	Secretary of Finance Department and Secretary of the Central Demobilisation Board, British Red Cross Society. "For services in connection with the War".	C	
1 January 1920	George Metcalfe, CBE, JP	Representative of Stock Exchange on American Dollar Securities Committee. "For services in connection with the War".	C	
1 January 1920	John Joseph Mooney, JP	Member of Advisory Committee on Repatriation and Internment of Aliens.	C	
1 January 1920	George Murray	Casualties Branch, War Office. "For services in connection with the War".	C	
1 January 1920	Thomas Drysdale Nicol	Controller and Financial Adviser, Aircraft Contracts, Ministry of Munitions, services in connection with Disposals Board. "For services in connection with the War".	C	
1 January 1920	Commander Franke Bartlett Stuart Notley, RD	Royal Naval Reserve. Marine Superintendent, Peninsular and Oriental Steam Navigation Company Ltd. "For services in connection with the War".	C	
1 January 1920	Charles William Chadwick Oman, LLD, MP	Chichele Professor of Modern History, Oxford University; services rendered to Foreign Office in connection with historical research. "For services in connection with the War".	C	
1 January 1920	Arthur Eugene O'Neill, CBE	For "voluntary services in Requisitioning Branch, Ministry of Shipping" and "in connection with the War".	C	
1 January 1920	Edward Hussey Packe	Private Secretary to successive First Lords of the Admiralty. "For services in connection with the War".	C	
1 January 1920	Alfred Vaughan Paton	President of the Liverpool Cotton Association. "For services in connection with the War".	C	
1 January 1920	Joseph Ernest Petavel, DSc, FRS	Chairman of Aero-Dynamics Sub-Committee of the Advisory Committee on Aeronautics. "For services in connection with the War".	C	
1 January 1920	William Petersen	Chairman of British Committee of the International Shipping Registry. "For services in connection with the War".	C	
1 January 1920	Percival Phillips	Senior War Correspondent on Western Front during the War. "For services in connection with the War".	C	
1 January 1920	George Walter Prothero, LittD, LLD	Head of Historical Section, Foreign Office, and Editor of the series of Handbooks compiled for use at the Peace Conference. "For services in connection with the War".	C	
1 January 1920	Captain James Robert Rae, OBE	Master, SS City of Exeter. "For services in connection with the War".	C	
1 January 1920	Ernest Manifold Raeburn, CBE	Head of the Ministry of Shipping in New York. "For services in connection with the War".	C	
1 January 1920	Harry Benedetto Renwick	Formerly Director of Feeding Stuffs Department, Ministry of Flood; Chairman and Managing Director of County of London Electric Supply Company Ltd. "For services in connection with the War".	C	
1 January 1920	Harry Perry Robinson	War Correspondent of The Times. "For services in connection with the War".	C	
1 January 1920	Herbert Thomas Robson	President of the Board of Directors of the Wheat Export Co., New York. "For services in connection with the War".	C	
1 January 1920	Major-General Richard Matthews Ruck, CB, CMG	Vice-Chairman of Air Inventions Committee. "For services in connection with the War".	C	
1 January 1920	Herbert William Henry Russell	War Correspondent of Renter's and the Press Association. "For services in connection with the War".	C	
1 January 1920	Sir Archibald Tutton James Salvidge, JP	For public services in Liverpool. "For services in connection with the War".	C	
1 January 1920	Edward Marlay Samson, OBE, KC	Recorder of Swansea; Chairman of South Wales and Monmouthshire Joint War Pensions Committee. "For services in connection with the War".	C	
1 January 1920	Charles John Ough Sanders, CBE	Chairman of Shipbuilding Employers' Federation. "For services in connection with the War".	C	
1 January 1920	William Schooling, CBE	Member of the National War Savings Committee. "For services in connection with the War".	C	
1 January 1920	William Anker Simmons, CBE, JP	Agricultural Adviser, Ministry of Food. "For services in connection with the War".	C	
1 January 1920	Mortimer Singer, JP	Donor and Organiser, Milton Hill Auxiliary Hospital, Steventon, Berkshire. "For services in connection with the War".	C	
1 January 1920	Lieutenant-Commander Sampson Sladen, RN	Formerly Chief Officer, London Fire Brigade. "For services in connection with the War".	C	
1 January 1920	Thomas Smethurst, JP	Chairman of Manchester War Savings Committee; ex-Lord Mayor of Manchester. "For services in connection with the War".	C	
1 January 1920	Malcolm Smith, JP	Formerly Provost of Leith. "For services in connection with the War".	C	
1 January 1920	Harold Edward Snagge	For work in connection with the Ministry of Information. "For services in connection with the War".	C	
1 January 1920	Arthur Munro Sutherland	Formerly Lord Mayor of Newcastle. "For services in connection with the War".	C	
1 January 1920	John Swaish, DL, JP	Lord Mayor of Bristol, 1914–1915. "For services in connection with the War".	C	
1 January 1920	Major Robert William Tate, CBE	Fellow of Trinity College, Dublin; Officer Commanding Trinity College OTC. "For services in connection with the War".	C	
1 January 1920	William Beach Thomas	War Correspondent of the Daily Mail. "For services in connection with the War".	C	
1 January 1920	Percy Thompson, CB	Deputy Chairman, Board of Inland Revenue. "For services in connection with the War".	C	
1 January 1920	Thomas George Owens Thurston	For "services in connection with Admiralty Inventions" and "in connection with the war"; Managing Director of the Forth Engineering and Shipbuilding Co. Ltd.	C	
1 January 1920	Captain William Hugh Tomasson, CBE, MVO	Chief Constable of Nottinghamshire. "For services in connection with the War".	C	
1 January 1920	Joseph Turner, JP	Managing Director, British Dyes Ltd. "For services in connection with the War".	C	
1 January 1920	Brevet Lieutenant-Colonel David Wallace, CMG, CBE, MB, FRCS	Organiser and Consulting and Operating Surgeon, Dalmeny House Auxiliary Hospital; Red Cross Commissioner and Military Inspection Officer to Auxiliary Hospitals. "For services in connection with the War".	C	
1 January 1920	Nicholas Edwin Waterhouse	Director of Costings, War Office; Partner in Messrs Price, Waterhouse & Co. "For services in connection with the War".	C	
1 January 1920	Lawrence Weaver, CBE	Commercial Secretary to Board of Agriculture. "For services in connection with the War".	C	
1 January 1920	Brevet Colonel Arthur Lisle Ambrose Webb, CB, CMG	Director-General of Medical Services, Ministry of Pensions. "For services in connection with the War".	C	
1 January 1920	Captain Maynard Francis Colchester-Wemyss, CBE	County Director, Auxiliary Hospitals and V.A.D.'s, Gloucestershire Branch, British Red Cross Society; formerly Head of the Food Control for Auxiliary Hospitals; Deputy Chairman, Red Cross Central Demobilisation Board; High Sheriff of Gloucestershire. "For services in connection with the War".	C	
1 January 1920	Frederick James Willis, CB	Assistant Secretary, Ministry of Health. "For services in connection with the War".	C	
1 January 1920	Colonel William Charles Wright, CB	Director-of Baldwins, Ltd., and Port Talbot Steel Company, Ltd. "For services in connection with the War".	C	
1 January 1920	Catherine Leslie, Lady Wingate	President of Cairo and Alexandria Red Cross Committee and of the Empire Nurses Red Cross Clubs in Cairo and Alexandria.	C	
1 January 1920	Harry Percival Densham	Chairman of the United Tanners' Federation.	C	
1 January 1920	Drummond Fraser	"For valuable services in connection with the War Savings Movement".	C	
1 January 1920	John O'Conor, MD	Head of British Hospital in Buenos Aires. "For services in connection with the War".	C	
1 January 1920	Arthur Ritson, JP	Adviser on Shipping Matters to the Naval Staff, 1917–1919. "For services in connection with the War".	C	
15 March 1920	Colonel (temporary Brigadier-General) John Samuel Jocelyn Percy, CB, CMG, DSO	"In recognition of valuable services rendered in connection with Military Operations in South Russia".	M	
16 April 1920	Paymaster Captain Hamnet Holditch Share, CB, RN	"For valuable services as Secretary to Admiral of the Fleet Viscount Jellicoe of Scapa".	M	
5 June 1920	Audrey Charlotte Georgina Buller, RRC	"For work as Administrator, War Hospitals, Exeter, throughout the War".	C	
3 August 1920	Baba Sir Gurbakesh Singh Bedi, CIE	"For services during the Operations against Afghanistan."	C	
24 August 1920	William Goodenough Hayter	Contentieux, Ministry of Finance, Cairo.	C	
15 October 1920	Hon. Henry Yule Braddon, MLC	Commonwealth Commissioner, United States of America.	C	
15 October 1920	George Brookman		C	
15 October 1920	Professor Tannatt William Edgeworth David, CMG		C	
15 October 1920	Robert Gibson	Repatriation Office.	C	
15 October 1920	Thomas Henley	Member of the Legislative Assembly, New South Wales.	C	
15 October 1920	William George McBeath, CBE		C	
15 October 1920	Hon. Alfred William Meeks	Member of the Legislative Council, New South Wales.	C	
15 October 1920	Arthur Rickard		C	
15 October 1920	James Joynton Smith		C	
15 October 1920	Reginald Andrew Blankenberg, OBE	Secretary, Office of the High Commissioner of South Africa in London for the Union of South Africa.	C	
15 October 1920	Hon. Albert Browne, CMG, CBE, ISO	Honorary Secretary, Governor-General of South Africa's Fund.	C	
15 October 1920	Colonel William Dalrymple	"For services in connection with recruiting and general war work".	C	
15 October 1920	Major-General Alfred Hamilton Mackenzie Edwards, CB, MVO	Commandant-General, Rhodesian Forces. "For services in connection with the East African campaign".	C	
