= Philip Stewart Robinson =

19th-century British naturalist and author

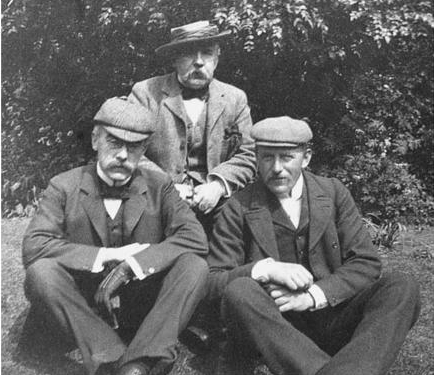
Phil Robinson at back in 1901 with brothers Kay to his left and Harry to his right

Philip Stewart Robinson (from around 1889 as Frederick Stennard Robinson) (13 October 1847 – 9 December 1902) and from 18 was an Indian-born British naturalist, journalist and popular author who popularized the genre of humorous Anglo-Indian literature. He was briefly an editor for the Sunday Times. Phil was a brother of E. Kay Robinson who was famous for nurturing Rudyard Kipling and founding the British Naturalists' Association. It has been claimed that his style of writing influenced authors like Edward Hamilton Aitken (Eha). His youngest brother was Sir Harry Perry Robinson (1859–1930).

== Life and work ==
Phil was born at Chunar in India and was one of six children of Julian Robinson, an army chaplain and editor of the newspaper The Pioneer. His mother was Harriet Woodcocke, daughter of Thomas Sharpe, Vicar of Doncaster. Phil was educated at Marlborough College and after graduating in 1865, worked as a librarian at Cardiff. In 1869 he returned to India to assist his father at The Pioneer. He edited several other publications and in 1873 he joined Allahabad College as a professor of literature. Robinson was also appointed a Supreme Governor of Censor to the vernacular press in India. Retiring in 1877 he returned to England to work for The Daily Telegraph, serving as a reporter during the second Afghan campaign and the Zulu war. He was dismissed from the Sunday Times in May 1891 after he published a piece on the Prince of Wales' finances. He also worked with the Daily Chronicle and then The Pall Mall Gazette. He was a member of the Savage Club and appointed fourteen of its members into The Sunday Times after becoming its editor.

Robinson married Sarah Elizabeth King in December 1876 and they had a son and a daughter. This marriage ended in a scandalous divorce that was covered extensively by the press. His wife claimed cruelty, adultery and desertion and was granted a judicial separation. In 1882 he served as a war correspondent for the Daily Chronicle in Egypt and in Sudan from 1885. He was declared bankrupt in 1889 and he changed his name to Frederick Stennard Robinson to evade creditors. From 1893 he lived with Alice Cornwell who took the name of Robinson although they were not married. They had a daughter. He lived at Mortivals in Takeley, Essex. From 1898 he served in Cuba as a correspondent for the Pall Mall Gazette and later the Associated Press during which time he suffered imprisonment. He published little after that and suffered from poor health, possibly from syphilis.

He published several books on life in India that were written in a humorous tone. These works include:

- Nugae Indicae, or on Leave in my Compound (1871)
  - Second edition as Nugae Indicae. Selected from Zechariah Oriel's Note book. (1873)
- In my Indian Garden (1878)
- Under the Punkah (1881)
- Noah's Ark, or Mornings at the Zoo (1881)
- Under the Sun (1882)
- The Poets' Birds (1883)
- Sinners and Saints : a Tour across the States and round them; with three months among the Mormons (1883)
- Chasing a Fortune (1884)
- Tigers at Large (1884)
- The Valley of Teetotum Trees (1886)
- Along with his brothers Edward Kay Robinson and Harry Perry Robinson -Tales by Three Brothers (1902)
