= Samuel Hickson =

Samuel Hickson is the name of:

- Samuel Hickson (British Army officer)
- Samuel Hickson (footballer)
