= Louis Raemaekers =

Dutch painter

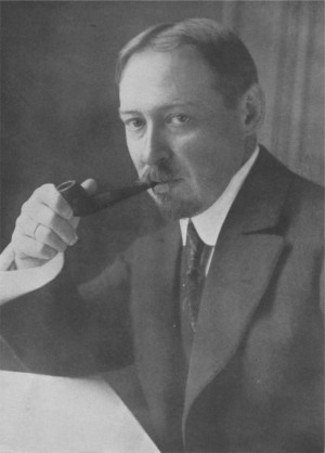
- Born: April 6, 1869; Roermond, Netherlands
- Died: July 26, 1956 (aged 87); Scheveningen, Netherlands
- Occupation: Editorial cartoonist

Louis Raemaekers (April 6, 1869 – July 26, 1956) was a Dutch painter, caricaturist and editorial cartoonist for the Amsterdam newspaper De Telegraaf during World War I, noted for his anti-German stance. (Note: This article draws in part on research by Ariane de Ranitz, particularly her book Louis Raemaekers: 'Armed With Pen and Pencil'.)

== Early life ==
He was born and grew up in Roermond, Netherlands, during a period of political and social unrest in the city, which at that time formed the battleground between Catholic clericalism and liberalism. Louis' father published a weekly journal called De Volksvriend (Friend of the People) and was an influential man in liberal circles. His battle against the establishment set the tone for his son's standpoint several decades later, when he fought against the occupation of neutral Belgium at the start of the First World War. His mother was of German descent. He was trained – and later working – as a drawing teacher and made landscapes and children's books covers and illustrations in his free time. In 1906 his life took a decisive turn when he accepted the invitation to draw political cartoons for leading Dutch newspapers, first from 1906 to 1909 for the Algemeen Handelsblad and from 1909 onwards for De Telegraaf.

== First World War ==
Immediately after the Germans invaded Belgium, Louis Raemaekers became one of their fiercest critics. His message was clear: the Netherlands had to take sides for the Allies and abandon its neutral stance. His graphic cartoons depicted the rule of the German military in Belgium, portrayed the Germans as barbarians and Kaiser Wilhelm II as an ally of Satan. His work was confiscated on several occasions by the Dutch government, and he was criticised by many for endangering Dutch neutrality. The minister of Foreign Affairs John Loudon invited Raemaekers, the owner of De Telegraaf Hak Holdert and the editor-in-chief Kick Schröder under pressure from the German government to a meeting, at which he requested them to avoid "anything that tends towards insulting the German Kaiser and the German army". It was not possible to prosecute Raemaekers for as long as the country was not under martial law. But the pressure on him continued, also from Germany: in September 1915, the rumor even started circulating that the German government had offered a reward of 12,000 guilders for Raemaekers, dead or alive, but proof of an official statement has never been found.

Louis Raemaekers achieved his greatest successes outside his native country. He left for London in November 1915, where his work was exhibited in the Fine Art Society on Bond Street. It was received with much acclaim. Raemaekers became an instant celebrity and his drawings were the talk of the town: "they formed the subject of pulpit addresses, and during two months, the galleries where they have been exhibited have been thronged to excess. Practically every cartoon has been purchased at considerable prices". He decided to settle in England and his family followed in early 1916. His leaving the Netherlands for London was a godsend for all concerned. Henceforth, the Dutch government could distance itself from the cartoonist and his work in its diplomatic relations, thus stabilising its position vis-à-vis Germany, while Raemaekers himself could cease his hopeless campaign to get the Netherlands to abandon its neutral stance. He may also have realised for himself that his aim of persuading his country to take up arms and thus avoid the fate of Belgium was not very realistic. From early 1915 Raemaekers' cartoons had already appeared in British newspapers and magazines. In early 1916 he signed a contract with the Daily Mail and they appeared in this newspaper on a regular basis for the next two years.

World War I Cartoons by Raemaekers
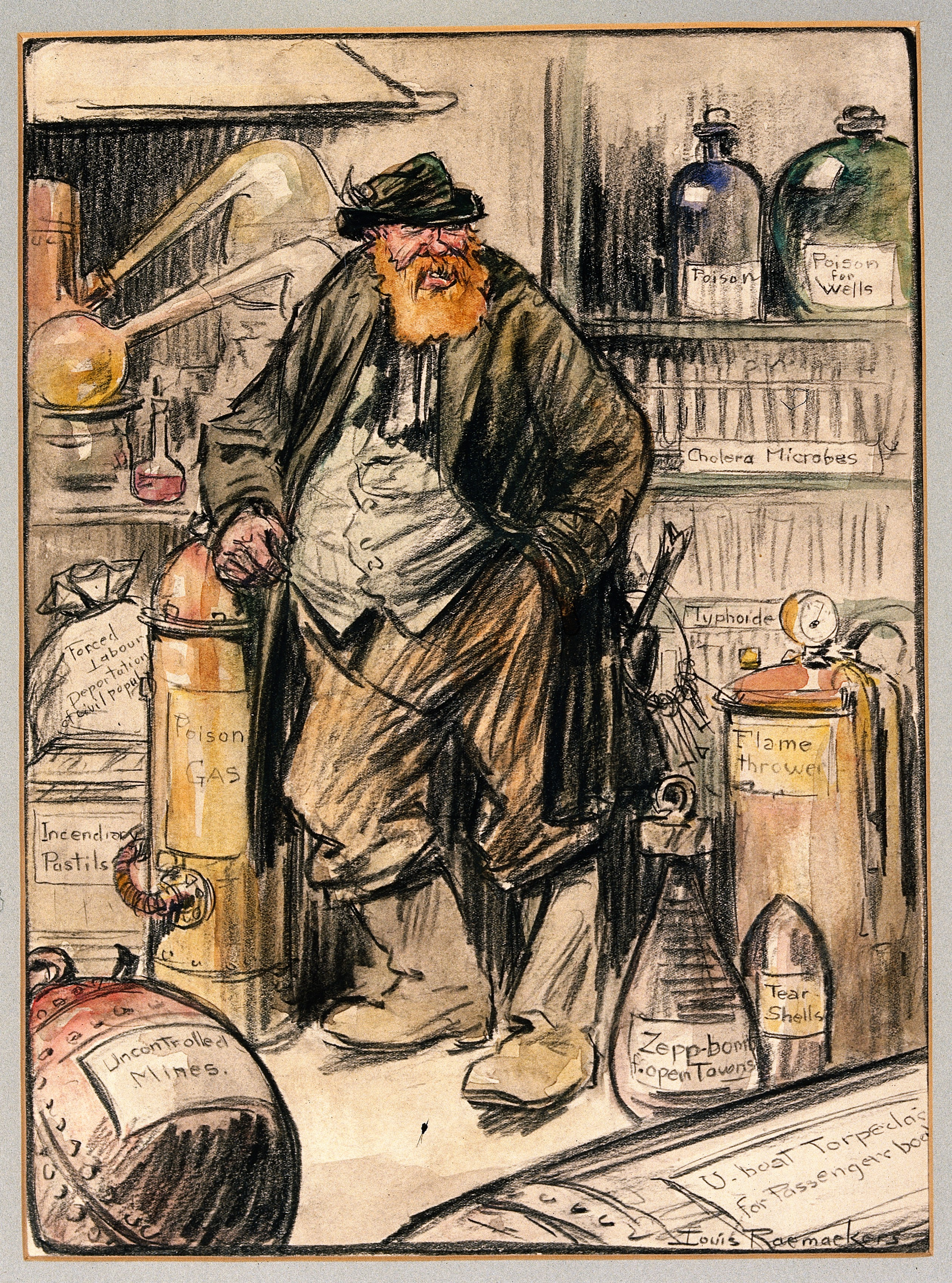
The Hun Ministry of Munitions

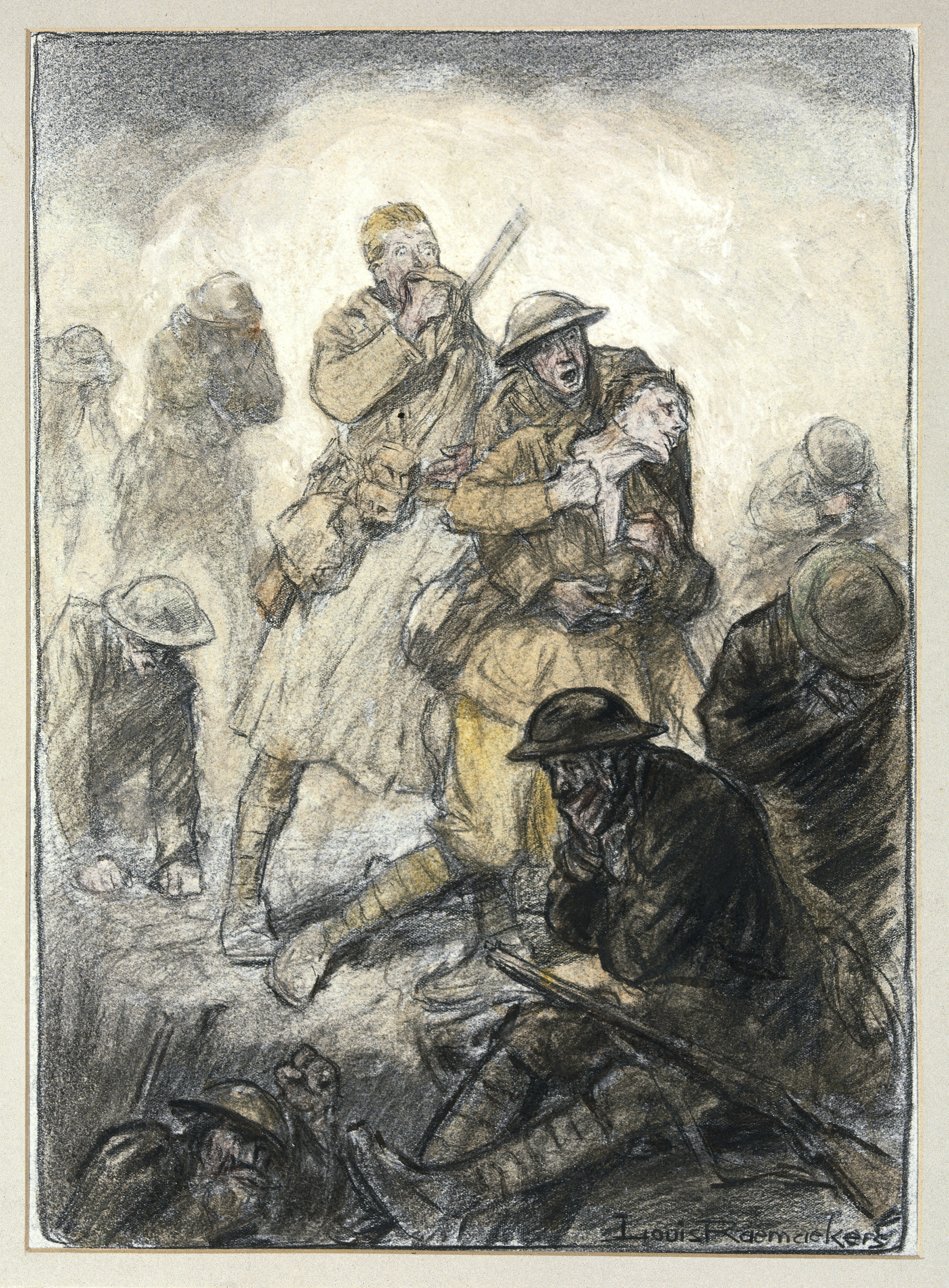
A Poisonous Gas Attack on the Canadians

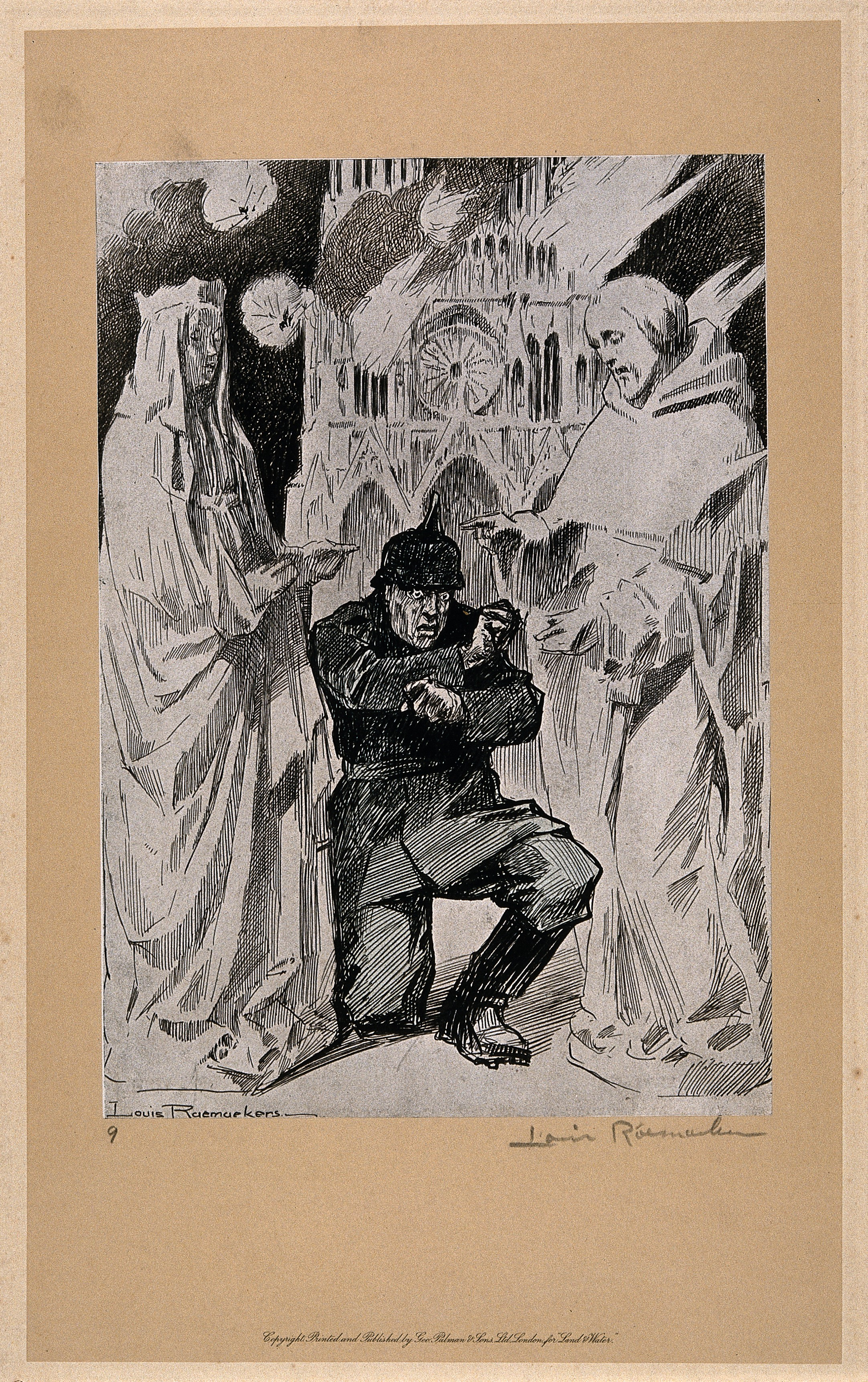
A German Soldier Crouches in Fear Between Two

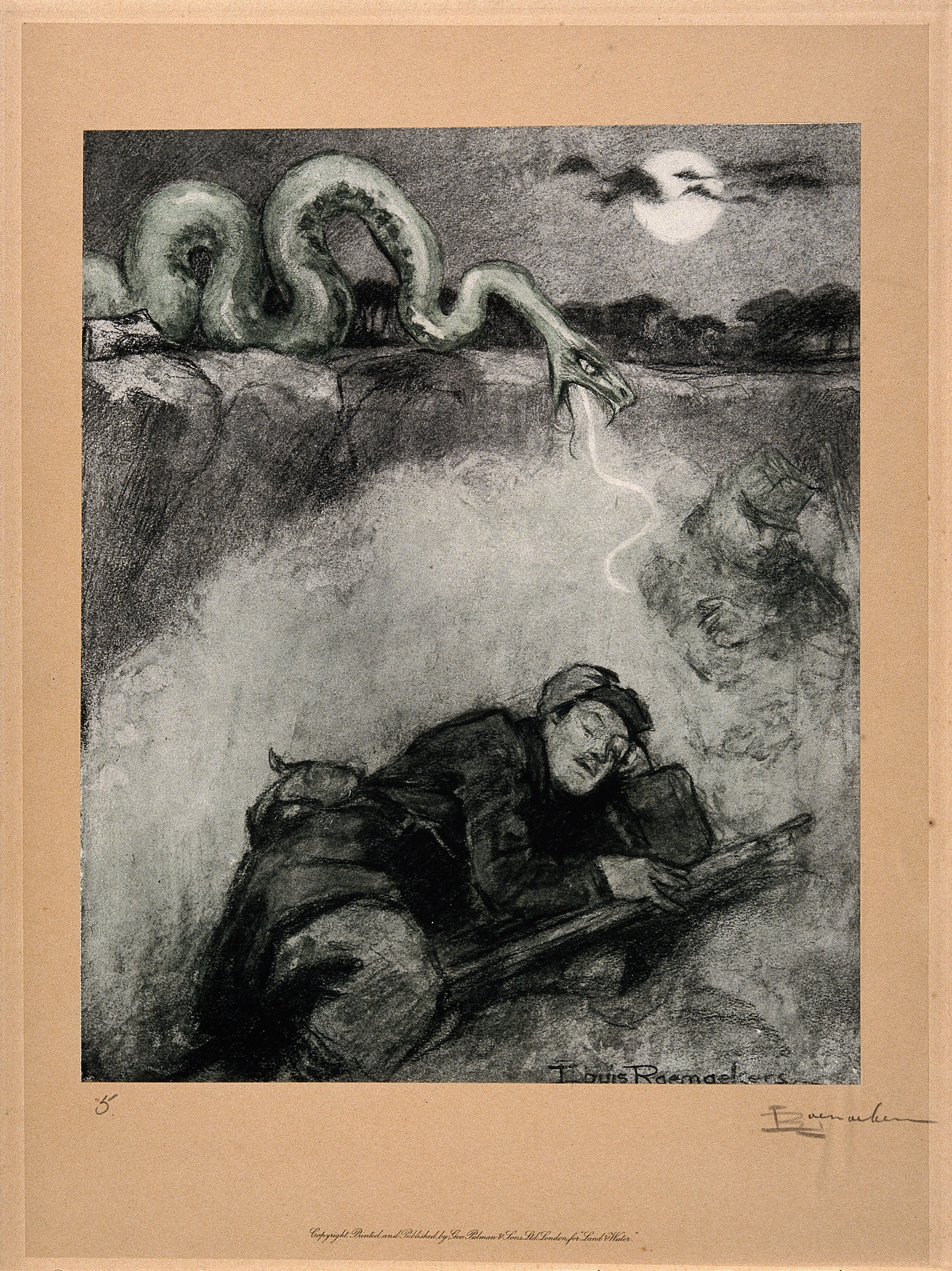
A Large Snake, Symbolic of a Gas Attack

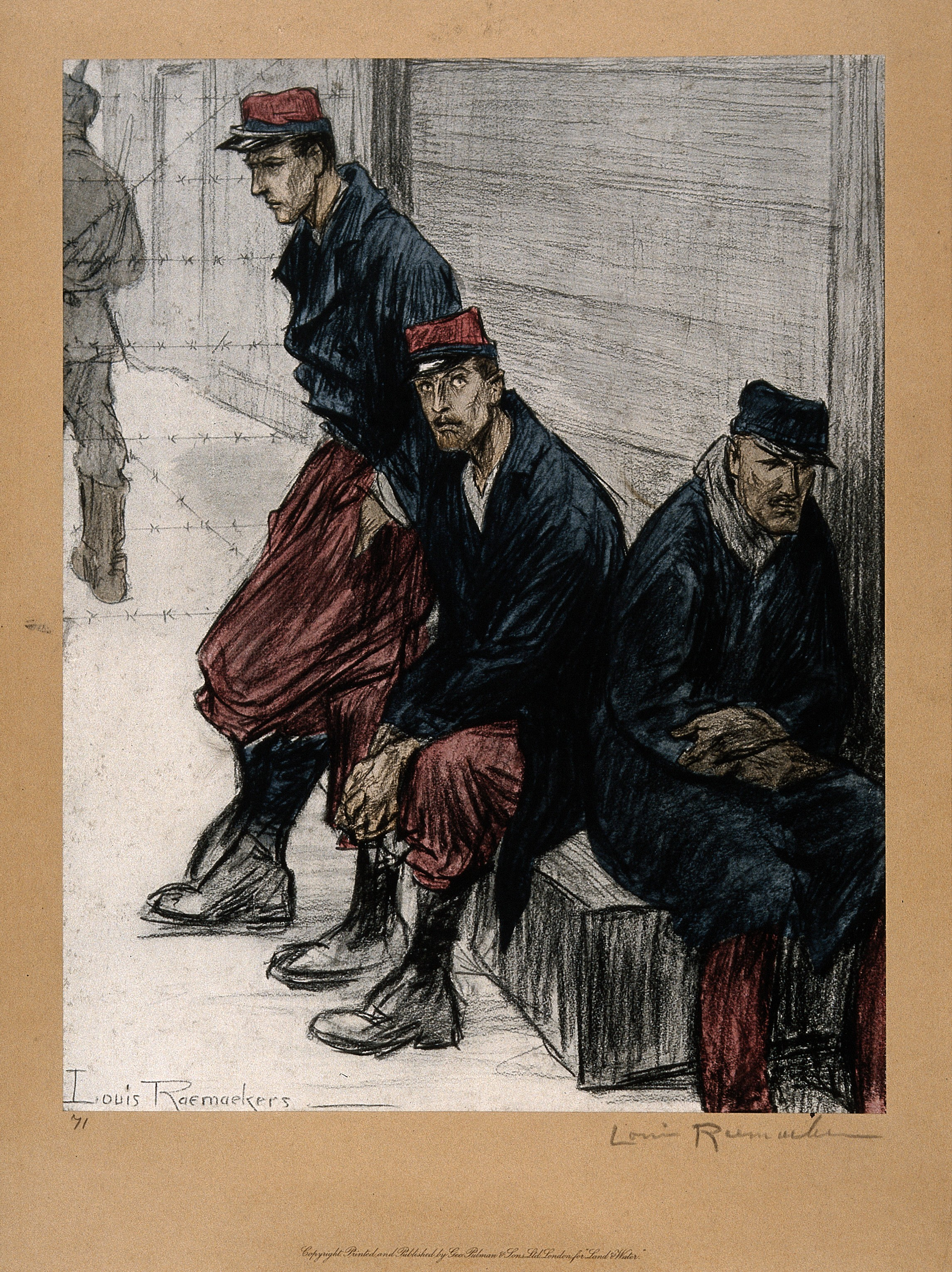
Three French Prisoners of War Slouching

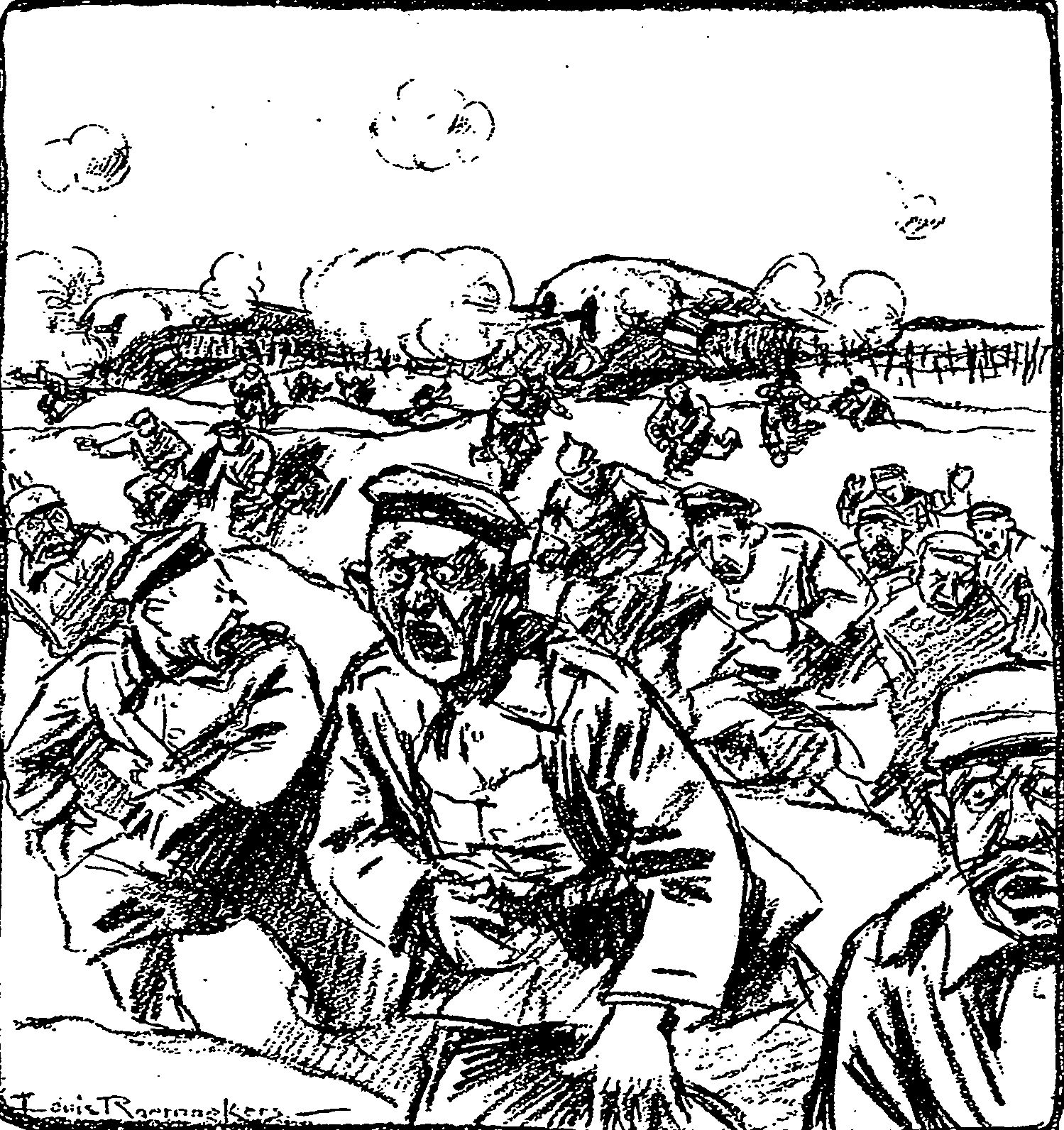
Tanks

== War propaganda ==
The most important aspect of Raemaekers' career is undoubtedly his role in Allied war propaganda. Soon after his arrival in London he was contacted by Britain's War Propaganda Bureau, the Wellington House, namely to ensure the mass distribution of his work both in England and elsewhere in support of Allied propaganda. Forty of his most captive cartoons were published in Raemaekers Cartoons, which was immediately translated in eighteen languages and distributed worldwide in neutral countries. This was the beginning of a new phase in his life, one which brought him world renown. Among the Allies and in neutral countries, it was specifically Raemaekers' alleged neutral status that gave him credibility. This was most effusively expressed by his good friend Harry Perry Robinson, a not totally unbiased journalist from The Times in Raemaekers' album The Great War: a Neutral's Indictment (1916): "Raemaekers" testimony is a testimony of an eye-witness. He saw the pitiable stream of refugees which poured from desolated Belgium across the Dutch frontier; and he heard the tale of the abominations which they had suffered from their own lips. ... His message to the world, therefore, when he began to speak, had all the authority not only of a Neutral who was unbiased, but of a Neutral who knew".

After the first exhibition in London, many others followed suit, first in the United Kingdom and France, soon afterwards in many countries over the world. Albums, pamphlets, posters, postcards and cigarette cards bearing reproductions of his work soon became also available. His drawings were even recreated as tableaux vivants. The total number of Raemaekers' cartoons distributed in this major propaganda effort increased quickly into the millions.

== United States ==
From the summer of 1916 onwards efforts were made to distribute Raemaekers' work in the most powerful of the neutral countries, the United States. At the request of, and sponsored by the Wellington House, Raemaekers, in July 1917, visited the United States to draw attention to his work. The United States had declared war on Germany shortly before, and the Allies hoped that his presence would sway public opinion to their cause. His tour was a triumph. Raemaekers gave lectures and interviews, drew caricatures for the movie cameras, was a popular guest at society functions, and met President Woodrow Wilson and former President Theodore Roosevelt. Soon after his arrival he signed – to everyone's surprise – a contract with the International News Service, the syndicate of William Randolph Hearst. The Hearst newspapers were viewed as pro-German and had been cut off from all Allied news sources. But Raemaekers' own theory: "this is the most important target group because the readers are poisoned daily by tendentious articles" proved successful. Statistics show that by October 1917, more than two thousand American newspapers had published Raemaekers' cartoons in hundreds of millions of copies. The popularisation of his work is regarded as the largest propaganda effort of the First World War.

== Between the wars ==
Following the end of the First World War, Louis Raemaekers settled in Brussels. He was an advocate of the League of Nations and devoted many sketches and articles to the cause of unity in Europe. Meanwhile, he kept a close and suspicious eye on events in Germany. Interest in his work waned in Britain and France, where his war cartoons were still fresh in the public's memory. People had had enough of his depictions of atrocities. A Dutch publisher rejected a collection of his illustrations because "the public is rather weary of war topics". In 1927 he created a comic book about tuberculosis (TBC, the continental European abbreviation), titled Gezondheid is de grootste schat. In the thirties, however, people began to think that Raemaekers might be right about Germany. He grew more productive, but the artistic and content-related quality of his work suffered proportionately. He remained loyal to De Telegraaf until well into the thirties, even after the paper's management became pro-German. He took the same stance as during the First World War towards the Hearst Press: these readers were his most important target group.

== Second World War and last years ==
Raemaekers fled to the United States shortly before the start of the Second World War and remained there until 1946, when he returned to Brussels. He had not been forgotten in the Netherlands, but it was only on his eightieth birthday, in 1949, that his native country gave him the recognition that he had long desired: he was made an honorary citizen of the City of Roermond. After an absence of almost forty years, Raemaekers returned to the Netherlands in 1953.

He died in Scheveningen near The Hague in 1956.

== Legacy ==
In the summer of 1956, The Times published the obituary of a man who had enjoyed a worldwide reputation during the First World War: ‘Louis Raemaekers, the biting anti-German cartoonist of the 1914-18 War, died on July 26, 1956 at Scheveningen, near The Hague, at the age of 87. It has been said of Raemaekers that he was the one private individual who exercised a real and great influence on the course of the 1914-18 War. "... he was the one private individual who exercised a real and great influence on the course of the 1914–18 War. There were a dozen or so people — Emperors, Kings, statesmen, and commanders-in-chief ..." "Outside that circle of the great, Louis Raemaekers stands conspicuous as the one man who, without any assistance of title or office, indubitably swayed the destinies of peoples."

== Selected cartoons ==
To your health, Civilization! (first appeared 20 September 1914 in De Telegraaf)

Thrown to the Swine: The Martyred Nurse (first appeared 28 October 1915 in De Telegraaf). The nurse is Edith Cavell.

== List of decorations and honorary memberships ==
1. Chevalier in the Order of the Legion of Honour, France 1916
2. Honorary Citizen of Paris, France 1916
3. Fellow Honoris Causa of The Royal Society of Literature, United Kingdom 1916
4. Co-founder of the League of Neutral Countries, 1916
5. Membre d'Honneur de la Presse Internationale, Paris 1916
6. Honorary Member of The Saintsbury's Club, London 1917
7. Honorary Member of The Three Arts Club, London 1917
8. Honorary Member of the Royal Society of Miniature Painters, London 1917
9. Membre d'Honneur de la Ligue des Poilus de France en Belgique, 1918
10. Diploma of Honour of the League of Neutral Countries, 1918
11. Dutch representative to the League of Nations, 1918
12. Chevalier de l’Ordre de Léopold, Belgium 1920
13. Doctor Iuris Honoris Causa University of Glasgow, United Kingdom 1922
14. Officer in the Order of the Legion of Honour, France 1925
15. Commander in the Order of the Crown of Italy 1927
16. Commandeur de l'Ordre de la Couronne, Belgium 1929
17. Commander in the Order of Polonia Restituta, Poland 1929
18. Commander in the Order of the Three Stars, Latvia 1929
19. Honorary Member of the Royal Choral Society "Mastreechter Staar", Maastricht (NL) 1930
20. Commander in the Order of St. Sava, Serbia 1933
21. Officer in the Order of Oranje-Nassau, Netherlands 1934
22. Commander in the Order of the Lithuanian Grand Duke Gediminas, Lithuania 1935
23. Fellow of the Royal Society for the Encouragement of Arts, Manufactures and Commerce, United Kingdom 1937
24. Honorary Member of the International Mark Twain Society, Saint Louis MO (USA) 1937
25. Honorary Citizen of Roermond (NL) 1949

== Books with his artwork ==
1. Raemaekers' Cartoon History of the War. Vol 1. 1918–1919.
2. Raemaekers' Cartoon History of the War. Vol 2. 1918–1919.
3. Raemaekers' Cartoon History of the War. Vol 3. 1918–1919.
4. Raemaekers' Cartoons: With Accompanying Notes by Well-Known English Writers. With an appreciation from Herbert Henry Asquith (1852–1928), Prime Minister of England. Garden City & New York: Doubleday, Page & Company. 1916.
5. Through the Iron Bars.

== Bibliography ==
=== References ===
- Cammaerts, Émile (1878–1953) (1917). Through the Iron Bars (Two Years of German Occupation in Belgium). Illustrated with cartoons by Louis Raemaekers. London: John Lane (1854–1925), The Bodley Head. New York: John Lane Company. LCCN 17-22575; OCLC 1189425 (all editions).
1. Via Internet Archive (University of North Carolina at Greensboro; Lyrasis Members and Sloan Foundation).
- De Ranitz, Ariane, PhD.
1. Nederlands: Louis Raemaekers met pen en potlood als wapen: Politiek tekenen van neutraliteit in de Eerste Wereldoorlog (in Dutch). Roermond: Stichting Louis Raemaeker (publisher). 2014. ISBN 978-9-0780-7415-1, 9-0780-7415-9; OCLC 943991075 (all editions).
  1. Het boek bevat het artikel : Ruitenberg, Liesbeth (July 26, 1913). "Een keizerlijke collectie in Doorn: Wilhelm II en de fotografie" (in Dutch). Nederlands Instituut voor Beeld en Geluid (oorspronkelijke uitgever). OCLC 988090816.
2. English: Louis Raemaekers, 'Armed With Pen and Pencil'. How a Dutch Cartoonist Became World Famous During the First World War (translated from the original Dutch to English). Roermond: Louis Raemaekers Foundation (publisher). 2014. LCCN 2021-399608; ISBN 978-9-0780-7419-9, 9-0780-7419-1; OCLC 900284941 (all editions), OCLC 900284941 (all editions).
  1. The book contains the article: Ruitenberg, Liesbeth (July 26, 1913). "The Kaiser in Exile: Wilhelm II in Doorn" (translated from the original Dutch to English). Netherlands Institute for Sound and Vision (original publisher). OCLC 933770023.
- Fine Art Society, ed. (1915–1920). Exhibition Catalogues (paperback). London (148 New Bond Street).
1. War Cartoons by Louis Raemaekers. Catalogue Nos. 506–530. OCLC 1008587425 (all editions) (1915–1917; Nos. 506–530), OCLC 1008581003 (all editions) (1917–1918; Nos. 531–580); OCLC 150554151 (all editions) & OCLC 150554146 (all editions) (Microfilm. Cambridge: Chadwyck-Healey. 1979).
  1. No. 514 (Dec. 1915 – Jan. 1916): "Catalogue of An Exhibition of War Cartoons by Louis Raemaekers" (20 pages, 8 leaves of plates). Preface by Arthur Clutton-Brock (1868–1924). OCLC 913369230 (all editions), OCLC 1052817926 (all editions).
  2. No. 515 (Feb. 1916 – Mar. 1916): "Facsimile Reproductions of the War Cartoons of Louis Raemaekers". pp. 2–3.
  3. No. ??? (1916): "Illustrated Catalogue of the Colour Facsimiles of Louis Raemaekers' War Cartoons" (41 leaves). OCLC 19465559 (all editions), OCLC 19465559 (all editions).
  4. No. 519 (Jan. 1917): "Catalogue of the Second Exhibition of War Cartoons by Louis Raemaekers". OCLC 913379084 (all editions)
  5. No. 542 (Nov. 1918): "Catalogue of an Exhibition of War Cartoons and Studies at the Front by Louis Raemaekers" (18 pages). OCLC 913379632 (all editions)
  6. No. 559 (Jan. 1920): "Exhibition of Cartoons: "Victory and After" by Louis Raemaekers" (12 pages). OCLC 1011794084 (all editions)
- Hoover Institution Library and Archives. Raemaekers (Louis) Papers and Artwork, 1901–1941. Stanford.
1. Collection index (OAC collection ID: tf258001qr) – via Online Archive of California.
2. Register (OAC collection ID: tf258001qr) – via Online Archive of California.
3. "Correspondence, 1901–1939" → Letter from Henri Mayer (Martinus Nijhoff) to Raemaekers, The Hague (Box 5, folder 23). January 28, 1929.
- Lambiek Comiclopedia. "Louis Raemaekers (6 April 1869 – 26 July 1956, The Netherlands)" (Last updated: December 26, 2025). Archived from the original on February 12, 2026. OCLC 62169818.
- Land & Water. LCCN 2006-204535 (microfilm); OCLC 63924619 (all editions).
1. Extra – "Raemaekers' Number". October 21, 1918 – via Google Books (Stanford). OCLC 21572360 (all editions) (this issue).
2. See Land & Water.
  1. Allison (1877–1929), James Murray (1877–1929) (October 21, 1918). "One Thousand Million Cartoons". pp. 4–19.
  2. Roosevelt, Theodore. "The Genius of Raemaekers" (from an article by Theodore Roosevelt). pp. 20–26.
  3. Menken, Solomon Stanwood (1870–1954). "The Mainspring of Armed Force". pp. 27 ... 55.
3. "The Land & Water Edition of Raemaekers' Cartoons". 1916. OCLC 11556338 (all editions).
  1. Via Internet Archive (University of Toronto).
- National Archives of the Netherlands. The Hague.
  See National Archives of the Netherlands.
1. Quoted in de Ranitz's 2014 book. p. 101.
- New York Times (The). LCCN sn00-61556; ISSN 0362-4331 (print), ISSN 1553-8095 (online).
1. Dispatch of The Times, London (July 27, 1956). "Louis Raemaekers, a Dutch Cartoonist Who Satirized World War I Germany, Dies". Vol. 105, whole no. 35979. p. 21 (columns 4–5, bottom). Retrieved February 11, 2026.
  1. Via NYTimes blog.
  2. Via TimesMachine (digital image 22 of 42).
  3. Pdf via TimesMachine (PDF).
  4. Permalink via TimesMachine.
  5. Via ProQuest 113787207 (Historical Newspapers database).
- New York Tribune (August 26, 1917). "Raemaekers Is Edited in the Hearst Papers – But Rumor That the Cartoonist Had Quit Work Is Denied". Vol. 77, whole no. 25851. p. 1 (column 5, bottom half) – via Chronicling America. LCCN sn83-30214, LCCN sn84-31846; ISSN 1941-0646; OCLC 9405688 (all editions).
- Raemaekers, Louis (1916–1919). The Great War – A Neutral's Indictment (3 Vols.). An appreciation by Harry Perry Robinson (1859–1930); Descriptive Notes by Edward William Garnett (1868–1937) and Marcus Bourne Huish (1843–1921). in the Victory Volume: Historical and descriptive notes by Cecil Roberts (1892–1976) (1st ed.). London: Fine Art Society, Ltd. Chiswick Press (printer). LCCN, a17000375, LCCN 17-28781; OCLC 1853867 (all editions), OCLC 1853808 (all editions), OCLC 504312577 (all editions), 1028838721.
1. Vol. 1 (1916): The Great War – A Neutral's Indictment. "One Hundred Cartoons". pp. xv–xvi.
2. Vol. 2 (1917): The Great War in 1916 – A Neutral's Indictment. "Sixty Cartoons".
3. Victory Volume (1919): The Great War – The Final Phase from the Entry of America to the Conclusion of Peace. "92 Cartoons".
- Raemaekers' Cartoons: With Accompanying Notes by Well-Known English Writers. With an appreciation from Herbert Henry Asquith (1852–1928), Prime Minister of England. Garden City & New York: Doubleday, Page & Company. 1916. LCCN 16-22444; OCLC 602767 (all editions)
1. Via Internet Archive (Library of Congress).
- Raemaekers' Cartoon History of the War. Compiled by James Murray Allison (1877–1929). London: John Lane (1854–1925), The Bodley Head. New York: The Century Company. 1918–1919. LCCN 19-11593 (Vol. 1 only); LCCN 18-26322 (Vols. 1–3).
1. Vol. 1: "The First Twelve Months of the War".
  1. Via HathiTrust (UC San Diego).
  2. Via Internet Archive (UT San Antonio – withdrawn).
  3. Via Google Books (Michigan).
  4. Via Wikimedia (Getty Center).
2. Vol. 2: "The Second Twelve Months of the War".
  1. Via HathiTrust (Northwestern).
  2. Via Google Books (Michigan).
  3. Via Wikimedia (PDF) (Getty Center).
3. Vol. 3: "The Third Twelve Months of the War".
  1. Via Internet Archive (UT San Antonio – withdrawn).
  2. Via Wikimedia (Getty Center).
- The Times. London. LCCN sn85-54080; ISSN 0140-0460; OCLC 61565875 (all editions); OCLC 6967919 (all editions).
1. "Mr. Louis Raemaekers" – "A Fierce Satirist". Issue 53594. July 27, 1956. p. 13 (column 1, top). Retrieved February 11, 2026. Gale CS218322683 (subscription required).
- TNA → The National Archives (UK); Foreign Office (FO) Files. Kew, London.
1. TNA FO 395/131 (22 May 1917). Neville Foster to David Lloyd George. → see Neville Chamberlain; and David Lloyd George. London.
2. TNA FO 395/131 (September 1917). "Statistics and Report".
→ FO 395 is a specific series of Foreign Office files, in this case, 395 being "News Department: General Correspondence from 1906."
→ 131 is the piece or file no. within the FO 131 series.
