= William Hugh Tomasson =

British police chief (1858–1922)

Sir William Hugh Tomasson KBE MVO KPM (1858 – 12 October 1922) was chief constable of Nottinghamshire County Constabulary, later known as the Nottinghamshire Police. He served in that position from 1 December 1892, until his death whilst still in office, on 12 October 1922.

== Personal life ==
Tomasson was born in Barnby Moor, Bassetlaw, Nottinghamshire, and was educated at Clifton College.

Between 1882 and 1887 he resided at Grove House in Brunt Street, Mansfield, Nottinghamshire.

In 1898 he moved to Woodthorpe House, Woodthorpe Grange Park, Woodthorpe, Nottinghamshire, where his family resided until 1930.

For 22 years Tomasson was Honorary Secretary of the Nottinghamshire County Cricket Club, and on retiring received a testimonial, £564 being presented.

== Military service ==
He fought in the campaign against the Pedi people in Transvaal Colony in 1878.

During the Anglo-Zulu War he joined the Cape Mounted Riflemen in the fight against chief Cetshwayo. He was also a captain in Baker's Horse, a section of the Frontier Light Horse. He was in this unit with Price Louis Napoleon, heir to Napoleon Bonaparte, who was attached there as an observer.

== Police career ==
Tomasson joined Nottinghamshire County Constabulary in 1880, being posted as an Inspector (incorrectly spelt as Thomasson), and shortly Superintendent in Mansfield. On the death of the retirement Chief Constable Henry Holden, Tomasson took over as chief constable of the force on 8 July 1856. He only finished this role on his death whilst still in office on 12 October 1922.

During his service, he was appointed a member (4th class) of the Royal Victorian Order in 1906. This is potentially as a result of his oversight of a Royal Visit to Worksop in 1905.

During the First World War he undertook special duties, including the overseeing of the guarding of National Shell Filling Factory, Chilwell.

His abilities in his role were recognised by being appointed Police Inspector for the Northern district of England.

He was made Commander of the Order of the British Empire (CBE) in the 1918 New Years Honours List, and knighted in the 1920 list for "Services in Connection with the War".
