= Max Hooper (naturalist) =

English naturalist (1934-2017)

Max Dorien Hooper (20 November 1934 – 10 February 2017) was an English naturalist and the inventor of "Hooper's rule" (also called "Hooper's law"), which is used to estimate the age of a hedgerow.

He received the Peter Scott Memorial Award.

== Selected publications ==
- Hedges. Collins New Naturalist series (with Ernie Pollard and Norman Moore)
- Nature Day and Night (with Richard Adams)
- Nature Through the Seasons (with Richard Adams)
