= Giana Stephen, Baroness Mount Stephen =

British courtier and philanthropist

The Right Honourable Lady Georgiana Mary "Giana" Stephen Baroness Mount Stephen, DBE
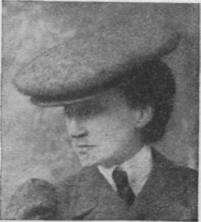
- Born: Georgiana Mary Tuffnell
- Organization: Queen Mary's Needlework Guild
- Known for: Friendship with Mary of Teck
- Title: Baroness Mount Stephen
- Spouse: Lord George Mount Stephen
- Honours: Dame Commander of the Order of the British Empire (1919)

Georgiana Mary "Giana" Stephen, Baroness Mount Stephen, DBE (née Tufnell, 1862 - 1933), also known as "Gian" and Lady Mount Stephen, was a British courtier and philanthropist known for her friendship with Mary of Teck, who went on to become Queen of the United Kingdom.

She was appointed a Dame Commander of the Order of the British Empire (DBE) in the 1919 New Year Honours, for "services to Queen Mary's Needlework Guild".

== Friendship with Mary of Teck ==
Giana was a childhood friend of Mary of Teck, serving as Lady-in-Waiting to both Mary (who later became Queen of the United Kingdom from 1910 until 1936) and her mother, the Duchess of Teck. The friendship between Giana's aunt, Lady Wolverton, and Queen Mary's parents, led Mary and Giana to meet after the sudden death of Lady Wolverton's husband, George Glyn, 2nd Baron Wolverton. Lady Wolverton formed what would later become Queen Mary's Needlework Guild in 1882 with the Duchess of Teck becoming its Patron in 1885.

The two bonded over a shared love of art and historical artifacts, swapping and refining their collections over the course of their lifelong friendship.

Giana also bequeathed Queen Mary a number of jewels upon her death, including a diamond riviere known as the "Lady Mount Stephen Necklace" or, later, as the "Queen Mary Riviere" when it was auctioned by Christie's. Queen Mary left the necklace to her granddaughter, Princess Margaret, and, according to Christie's it was "without question one of H.R.H. The Princess Margaret [sic] favourite jewels".

== Personal life and marriage ==
Born Georgiana Mary Tufnell in 1862, she was the daughter of retired naval captain Robert George Tufnell and Jessie Isabel Curtis, daughter of Sir William Curtis, 2nd Baronet. Giana's maternal grandfather, Sir William Curtis (1752 - 1829) was a banker and merchant affectionately known as "Sir Billy Biscuit" for his role supplying food to the Royal Navy.

Giana even met her husband, Lord George Mount Stephen, a Scottish-born Canadian business and railway owner (35 years her senior) through the Teck family. After the death of Stephen's first wife, Charlotte, they married in November 1897 and the Mount Stephens regularly hosted members of the royal family at Brocket Hall, a country house they leased in Hertfordshire.
