= E. Kay Robinson =

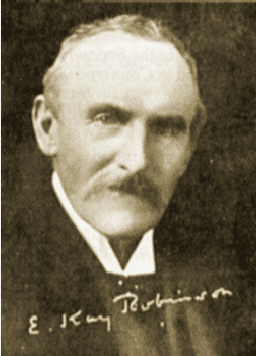
- Born: 12 December 1855; Nainital
- Died: 20 January 1928 (aged 72); Hampton Wick
- Occupation: Journalist, newspaper editor, radio personality
- Awards: Fellow of the Zoological Society of London

Edward Kay Robinson FZS (12 December 1855 – 20 January 1928) was a British journalist and popularizer of natural history studies. He founded the British Empire Naturalists' Association in 1905. As an editor at Lahore of the Civil and Military Gazette he encouraged Rudyard Kipling in his early years.

== Early life ==
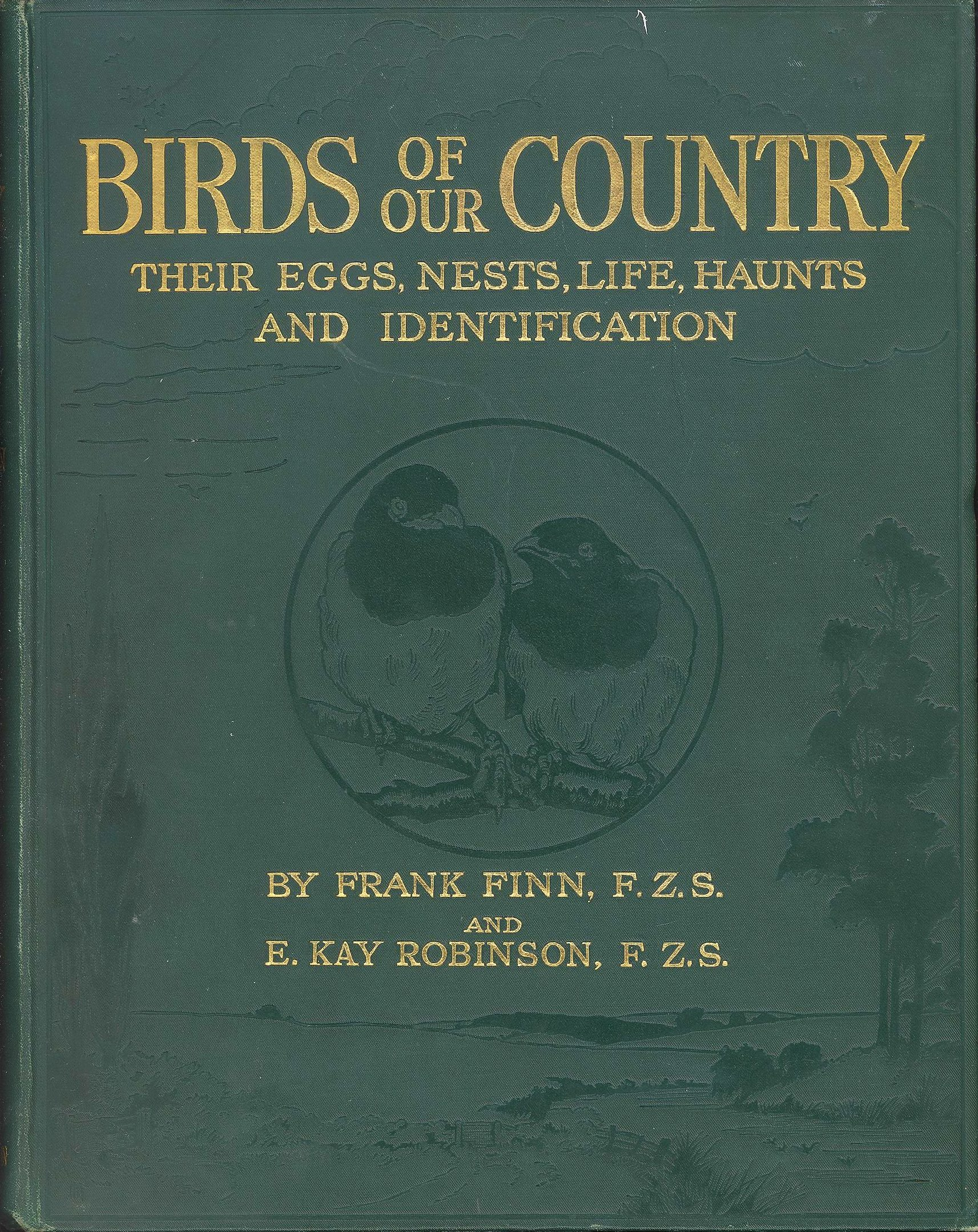
Cover of Birds of our Country (1912) by Frank Finn and E. Kay Robinson

Robinson was born in Naini Tal to Julian Robinson, an East India Company chaplain and Harriett Woodcock, daughter of Thomas Sharpe, vicar of Doncaster and canon of York. Julian Robinson later worked with the Pioneer newspaper. Before Robinson turned nine, the family returned to England and settled at Cheltenham where he went to school at the Junior Proprietary School and College. Here he picked up an interest in natural history with an interest in the butterflies and moths. When Charles Darwin visited the school, Robinson was selected to show him around. Robinson had two brothers and three sisters. The eldest brother Phil (1847–1902) helped his father in the newspaper and pioneered an Anglo-Indian style of humorous writing. The other brother Harry Perry became a war correspondent for which he was knighted and wrote several books. Robinson worked briefly as a schoolmaster before taking up journalism at the age of 19. He worked for a while at the Globe before going to Lahore in 1885, as editor of the Civil and Military Gazette where he was assisted by Rudyard Kipling. Kipling dedicated his "Life's Handicap" "To E.K.R. from R.K., 1887-89, CMG." A By The Way column was one of the innovations of Robinson at The Globe. Robinson and Kipling wrote ballads signed respectively by "K.R." and "R.K." He returned to England in 1895 and joined the Globe again. He started some newsletters from 1896 including "Science Gossip" and "Country Queries and Notes" and then merged them into the penny weekly Country-Side which was made as the official newsletter of the British Empire Naturalists' Association that he founded in 1905. He also published a monthly leaflet "The Meaning of Life", for those who try "to look through Nature up to Nature's God." He initially lived in London but moved later to Northgate Hall, Norfolk from where he also wrote several books including To-day with Nature, My Nature Note book and The Country Day by Day. A newspaper in 1907 reported his breakdown from overwork leading to him taking a break in the Canary Islands.

== Natural history ==
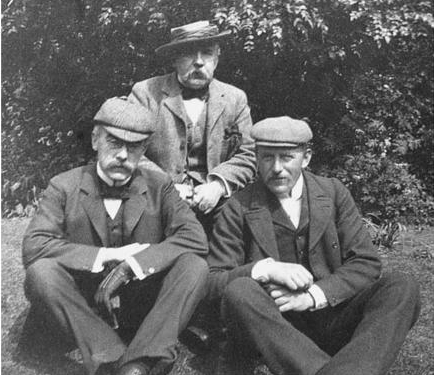
Left to right: Harry, Phil, and Kay Robinson in 1901

Robinson gave talks especially in schools on natural history and was among the first to broadcast natural history talks on radio. In 1924, the BBC put up microphones in the Surrey woods to broadcast the song of nightingales along with a talk by Robinson. His style of natural history writing was aimed to highlight the wonder of nature and not meant to be scientific. He aired ideas that were sometimes contrary to established theory, proposing for instance that colourful flowers evolved to deter cattle and other grazers rather than to attract insects. He was against animal cruelty and the idea of collection and museums for the study of natural history. He instead promoted photography. He died at Hampton Wick in January 1928 and the funeral was held at Golders Green.

Along with Frank Finn, he published a two volume book Birds of our Country in 1912.

He was a Fellow of the Zoological Society of London (FZS).

== Personal life ==
He married Florence Gordon in 1887 and had three sons, one of whom was killed in the First World War. He died at his home in Hampton Wick after a long illness, aged 72.
