= Frank Finn =

English ornithologist

Frank Finn FZS, MBOU (1868 – 1 October 1932) was an English ornithologist.

Finn was born in Maidstone and educated at Maidstone Grammar School and Brasenose College, Oxford. He went on a collecting expedition to East Africa in 1892, and became First Assistant Superintendent of the Indian Museum, Calcutta in 1894, and Deputy Superintendent from 1895 to 1903. He then returned to England, and was editor of the Avicultural Magazine in 1909–10.

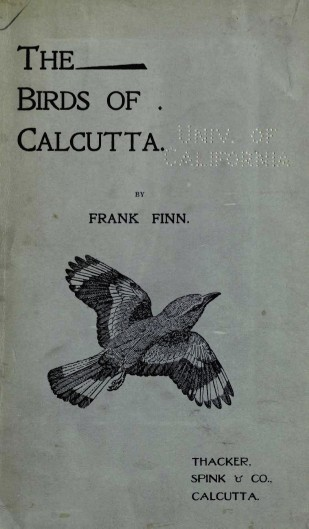
Cover of The Birds of Calcutta (1901) by Finn

Finn was a prolific author, his works including Garden and Aviary Birds of India, How to Know the Indian Ducks (1901), The Birds of Calcutta (1901), How to Know the Indian Waders (1906), Ornithological and other Oddities (1907), The Making of Species (1909, with Douglas Dewar), Eggs and Nests of British Birds (1910) and Indian Sporting Birds (1915). He also edited Robert A. Sterndale's book on the mammals of India and Ceylon and brought out a new and abridged edition titled Sterndale's Mammalia of India (1929), which included an appendix on reptiles.

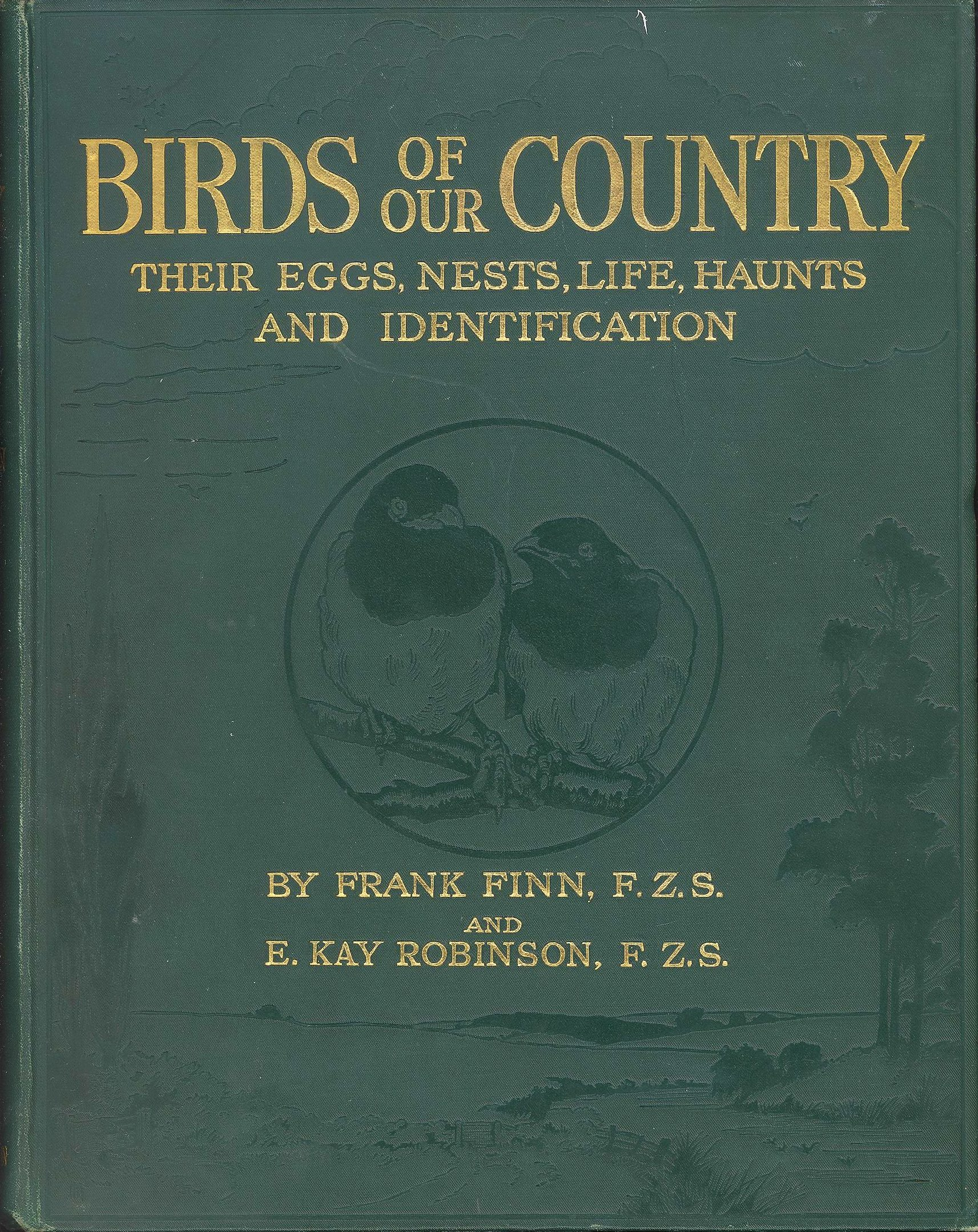
Cover of Birds of our Country (1912) by Finn and E. Kay Robinson

The weaver bird Ploceus megarhynchus was originally described from a specimen collected by A. O. Hume from Kaladhungi near Nainital in 1869. It was rediscovered near Calcutta by Finn, and E. C. Stuart Baker called it Finn's Weaver in the second edition of the Fauna of British India (1925).

Another species, though so far very rare and little known, needs mention here, as most of the recorded specimens have been met with in captivity. This is the Large-billed Weaver of the Terai (Ploceus megarhynchus) which has been confused with the Eastern Baya Weaver in ornithological works. The male of this species in its winter plumage and the female always is much like the ordinary Weavers in the corresponding garb, but noticeably larger, being almost as big as the Pawi or small Grey-headed Mynah. It is also of a duller brown and less streaked; but these points were not considered sufficient to distinguish it by anyone except Mr. Hume, until I found, quite by accident, that the summer-plumaged male was very different from our other species. It is much more yellow, this colour extending all over the undersurface of the body and nearly all over the head, so that practically the only brown parts are the wings and tail. My friend Mr. E. W. Harper secured a specimen of this fine bird lately, which passed into the possession of a well-known naturalist at home. This was procured in Tiretta Bazar at Calcutta, and some time later a dozen birds of the species turned up there, and were bought for training by a Parsee resident of that city, who took them to England for exhibition. The two birds, on which I was able to re-establish the species which Mr. Hume had first named from two skins, were obtained from the late Mr. Rutledge at Entally, so that in Calcutta one has the best chance of coming across one of the rarest and least known of Indian birds, only the few specimens I have alluded to being known to exist.

— Finn, 1915, Garden and Aviary Birds of India

Finn also described three new species of reptiles in collaboration with British naturalist Alfred William Alcock.

Finn was editor of The Zoologist during the last two years of its existence, from 1915 to 1916.
