= Charles Symonds =

English neurologist and RAF officer (1890–1978)

Sir Charles Symonds
- Born: Charles Putnam Symonds; 11 April 1890; London, England
- Died: 7 December 1978 (aged 88); Totteridge, England
- Military career
- Allegiance: United Kingdom
- Branch: British Army; Royal Air Force
- Rank: Air vice-marshal
- Conflicts: First World War; Second World War
- Awards: Knight Commander of the Order of the British Empire; Companion of the Order of the Bath; Médaille militaire (France)

Air Vice Marshal Sir Charles Putnam Symonds KBE CB (11 April 1890 – 7 December 1978) was an English neurologist and a senior medical officer in the Royal Air Force.

His initial medical training was at Guy's Hospital, followed by specialised training at the National Hospital for Neurology and Neurosurgery. Contributions to neurology by Symonds include a highly accurate description of subarachnoid haemorrhage in 1924, and idiopathic intracranial hypertension (which he termed "otitic hydrocephalus") in 1931.

He served in both the First and Second World Wars, initially in the ranks as a motorcycle despatch rider on the Western Front. After being wounded and invalided back to the United Kingdom, he completed his basic medical training and served as a medical officer, both on the front lines and attached to the Royal Flying Corps at Farnborough. In the mid-1930s he became a civilian consultant to the Royal Air Force and on the outbreak of the Second World War was commissioned as a group captain. By the end of the war he held the acting rank of air vice marshal and had been knighted.

== Early life ==
Symonds was born in London on 11 April 1890 to the Canadian-born Sir Charters Symonds, surgeon to Guy's Hospital, and his wife, Fanny Marie (née Shaw). Symonds was educated at Rugby School and then proceeded to New College, Oxford on a classics scholarship. He soon changed his degree course to medicine, and took a second class honours degree in physiology in 1912. He then continued his medical training at Guy's on a scholarship.

== First World War ==
On the outbreak of the First World War, Symonds left his medical studies and joined the British Army, serving as a despatch rider in the motorcycle section of the Royal Engineers. Attached to the 1st Division (sources are unclear if this was 1st Division or 1st Cavalry Division), he saw action at the Retreat from Mons, then in the battles of Marne and Aisne. He was wounded at the start of the Race to the Sea in September 1914, and was awarded the Médaille militaire, and then returned to his medical studies at Guy's.

He qualified as a Member of the Royal College of Surgeons (MRCS) and Licentiate of the Royal College of Physicians (LRCP) early in 1915, and was then commissioned into the Royal Army Medical Corps. He was initially attached to the Royal Flying Corps at Farnborough, gaining his first experience of aviation medicine. In this role he also regularly visited Aldershot where he worked with Edgar Adrian, a neurologist, and this was when he decided to specialise in neurology himself. He married Janet (née Palmer), daughter of Edward Bagnall Poulton in 1915, they were to have two sons, one of whom was the political satirist Richard Symonds. After his MRCP in 1916 he returned to France with 101 Field Ambulance and medical officer to 1st battalion, the Middlesex Regiment, and was promoted temporary captain on 8 May 1916, He resigned his commission on the grounds of ill-health contracted on active service on 2 February 1919.

== Inter-war years ==
Symonds completed his medical studies in 1919, gaining his MB BCh and also his Oxford Master of Arts and Doctor of Medicine. He was then appointed to the National Hospital for Neurology and Neurosurgery and in 1920 to Guy's as assistant physician for nervous diseases. His first wife died in 1919.

In 1920 he received a Radcliffe travelling fellowship, which he used to travel to the United States, studying psychiatry with Adolf Meyer at Johns Hopkins Hospital, Baltimore and neurosurgery with Harvey Cushing at the Peter Bent Brigham Hospital, Boston. In America he met and married his second wife Edythe Eva (née Dorton), with whom he had two sons. He contributed the neurological section to Practice of Medicine (12th edn, 1922 ed. Sir Frederick Taylor). In Boston, he described subarachnoid haemorrhage in 1924, in which year he was elected a Fellow of the Royal College of Physicians (FRCP).

He returned to the National Hospital in London in 1926, and was also appointed consultant in neurology to the Royal National Throat, Nose and Ear Hospital. From his observations of patients in these hospitals he published his description of what he named "otitic hydrocephalus" in 1931. The condition is now known as idiopathic intracranial hypertension.

== Second World War ==
Having been appointed a civilian consultant in neurology to the RAF in 1934, he was commissioned as a group captain on 11 September 1939, just after the outbreak of the Second World War. He initially worked on the RAF medical boards at the RAF's Central Medical Establishment, RAF Halton, and organised the establishment of the Military Hospital for Head Injuries at St Hugh's College, Oxford in partnership with Hugh Cairns. As the war progressed, much of his work centred on a condition called "flying stress", with Denis Williams he analysed over 3000 case studies leading to the report Clinical and Statistical Study of Neurosis Precipitated by Flying Duties for which Symonds was awarded the 1949 Raymond F. Longacre award, administered by the U.S. Aerospace Medical Association (AsMA), for scientific contribution to aviation medicine.

He was appointed Companion of the Order of the Bath (CB) in the 1944 New Year Honours, by which time he was an acting air commodore and on 16 January he was promoted acting air vice marshal. He retired from the RAF in 1945, and was appointed Knight Commander of the Order of the British Empire (KBE) in the 1946 New Year Honours.

== Later life ==
Symonds then returned to hospital practice, publishing more important papers, and becoming a highly regarded teacher. In 1952, he was appointed Sir Arthur Sims Commonwealth travelling professor for 1953, visiting Canada, Australia, and New Zealand. This was followed by appointments as visiting professor in San Francisco, and at the Montreal Neurological Institute. He was visiting neurologist at Johns Hopkins; an honorary member of both the American Neurological Association and the New York Neurological Association; corresponding member of the Société de Neurologie de Paris; president of both the neurological and psychiatric sections of the Royal Society of Medicine (RSM); and an honorary fellow of the Royal College of Physicians of Edinburgh.

In 1954, he gave the Harveian Oration at the Royal College of Physicians on 18 October and, in 1956, was elected president on the Association of British Neurologists. He retired from practice in 1963, moving to Ham, Wiltshire and was elected an honorary fellow of the RSM in 1964.

In retirement, he enjoyed bird-watching and fly-fishing. He continued to publish, in particular a 1970 edition of his own papers entitled Studies in Neurology. He died in Totteridge, north London on 7 December 1978.
