= Charters Symonds =

British-Canadian surgeon

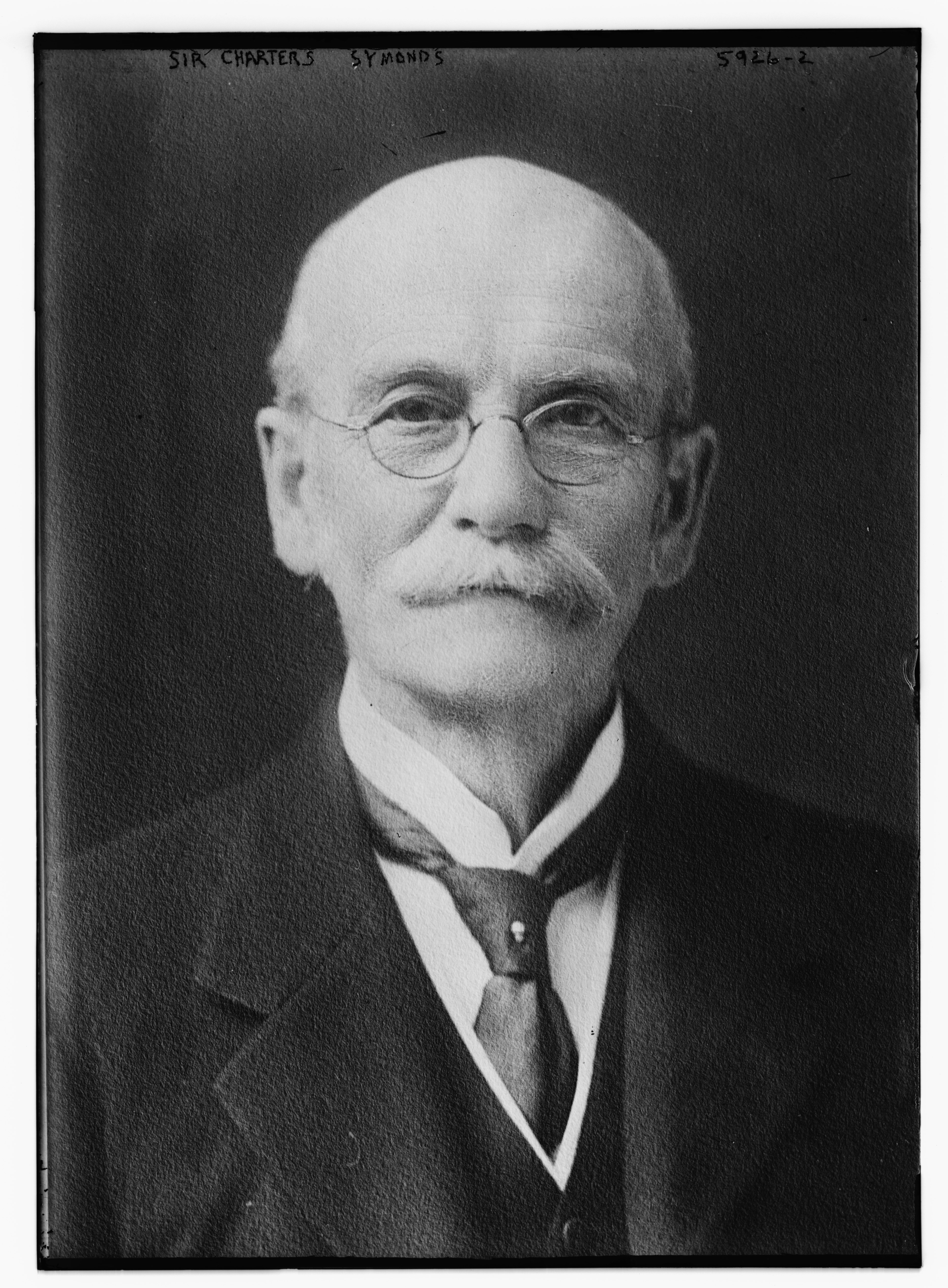
Charters Symonds

Sir Charters James Symonds KBE CB FRCS (1852–1932) was a British-Canadian surgeon, and surgeon to Guy's Hospital, London.

Charters Symonds was born at Dalhousie, Colony of New Brunswick on 24 July 1852, the son of Charles Symonds, a barrister, who died in California in 1860.

In 1889 he married Fanny Marie Shaw (d 1930), daughter of Lieutenant-General David Shaw, of the Madras Army, and they had two sons, the elder being Sir Charles Symonds physician to Guy's Hospital.

Symonds died on 4 September 1932 in Harrow, London, England, and was buried in Christ Church, Roxeth, Harrow.
