= British Naturalists' Association =

- Abbreviation: BNA
- Formation: 1905
- Type: Learned society
- President: Roger Tabor
- Website: bna-naturalists.org

The British Naturalists' Association (BNA), founded in 1905 by E. Kay Robinson as the British Empire Naturalists' Association (BENA), is an organization in the United Kingdom to promote the study of natural history. It publishes a journal called Country-side.

== Origins ==
The association, unlike others that specialized only in plants, birds, butterflies or other groups was aimed to be broader in its intent to promote the study of all branches of natural history. The editor of another contemporary organization writing in 1907 did not look upon the organization kindly, pointing out that the sale of its journal and other forms of advertisement appeared to be the main objective. Nationally, it organises conferences, study days, field weeks and weekends, lectures, and exhibitions. At branch level, there are talks and exploratory wildlife walks where newcomers can learn, and where experienced naturalists share their expertise. It publishes the magazine Country-Side.

The association helps by organizing information, publishing literature on natural history, and also helps out many publications and magazines from all over the world.

== Publications ==
Their magazine Country-side is published twice a year for BNA members, although it is also available at libraries. The quarterly newsletter British Naturalist is only for members.

The BNA series of books "How to Begin The Study of ...", which includes How to Begin the Study of Natural History, How to Begin The Study of Mosses and Liverworts and How to Begin The Study of Slugs and Snails, enables aspiring naturalists to learn about Britain's natural environment.

== Structure ==
The BNA's president is Roger Tabor.

== Awards ==
=== Peter Scott Memorial Award ===
The award was instituted after the death of Peter Scott, a long-time BNA vice-president, to commemorate his achievements. The award is given to those who have made an outstanding contribution to our understanding of natural history and conservation. As of 2019, recipients were: David Attenborough; Chris Baines; Trevor Beebee; David Bellamy; Gordon Benningfield; John Clegg; John Cloudsley-Thompson; Richard Fitter; Max Hooper; Harold Hughes; Simon King; Richard Mabey; George C. McGavin; Ian Newton; Bill Oddie; Oliver Rackham; Tony Soper; Richard Southwood; Roger Tabor; Kenneth Watkins; Sarah Wanless.

=== David Bellamy Award ===
The David Bellamy Award is an annual award is given to a field naturalist of distinction.

=== Richard Fitter Award ===
The Richard Fitter Memorial Medal is awarded annually to an individual who is a dedicated active field naturalist.
