= Queen Mother's Clothing Guild =

Logo of Queen Mother's Clothing Guild

Queen Mother's Clothing Guild is a British charity which distributes clothing and household linen to other charities in the United Kingdom.

== History ==
The guild was established in 1882 as The London Guild by Lady Wolverton after being asked to provide garments for a London orphanage. In 1885, the Duchess of Teck became the guild's patron and it was renamed The London Needlework Guild in 1889.

Upon the death of the duchess in 1897, the guild's royal patronage continued under her daughter, the Duchess of York (later Queen Mary), who had worked for the guild from her youth. She formed her own group and personally supervised the arrival and unpacking of the parcels at the Imperial Institute. In 1914, the charity was renamed Queen Mary's Needlework Guild and a new base at Friary Court in St. James's Palace was set up. It then began to supply troops during World War I, with branches being established throughout the Empire and other areas of the world, including China and Argentina. Despite rationing, production continued on a small scale throughout World War II and afterwards.

On 23 March 1953, Queen Mary invited the Presidents of the guild's group to Marlborough House for the Annual General Meeting but was unable to attend and died the next day. Queen Elizabeth the Queen Mother then took over as patron and the charity was renamed Queen Mary's Clothing Guild in 1986, which was felt best to describe the work of charity. In 2010, it took the name Queen Mother's Clothing Guild in honour of its former patron the Queen Mother.

After the death of the Queen Mother in 2002, in 2003 Princess Alexandra took over as patron. Other royal members were Princess Margaret and Mary, Princess Royal and Countess of Harewood.

== Patrons ==
- 1885–1897: Princess Mary, Duchess of Teck
- 1897–1953: Princess Mary, Duchess of York (Queen Mary from 1910 to 1953)
- 1953–2002: Queen Elizabeth the Queen Mother
- 2002–present: Princess Alexandra, the Honourable Lady Ogilvy
