= Samuel Hickson (British Army officer) =

British Army officer

Major-General Sir Samuel Hickson KBE CB
- Born: 14 November 1859
- Died: 22 March 1928 (aged 68)

Major-General Sir Samuel Hickson, KBE, CB (14 November 1859 – 22 March 1928) was a British Army officer in the Royal Army Medical Corps.

He was appointed a Knight Commander of the Order of the British Empire on 1 January 1919 "for valuable services rendered in connection with military operations in France and Flanders".
