= Harry Perry Robinson =

British writer and journalist

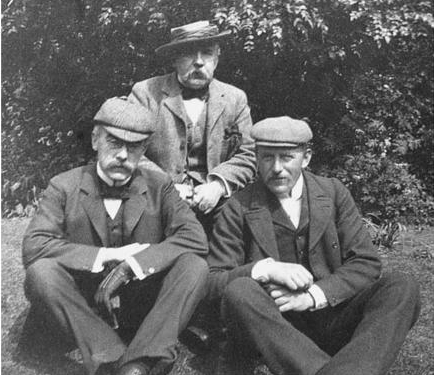
Left to right: Harry, Phil, and Kay Robinson in 1901

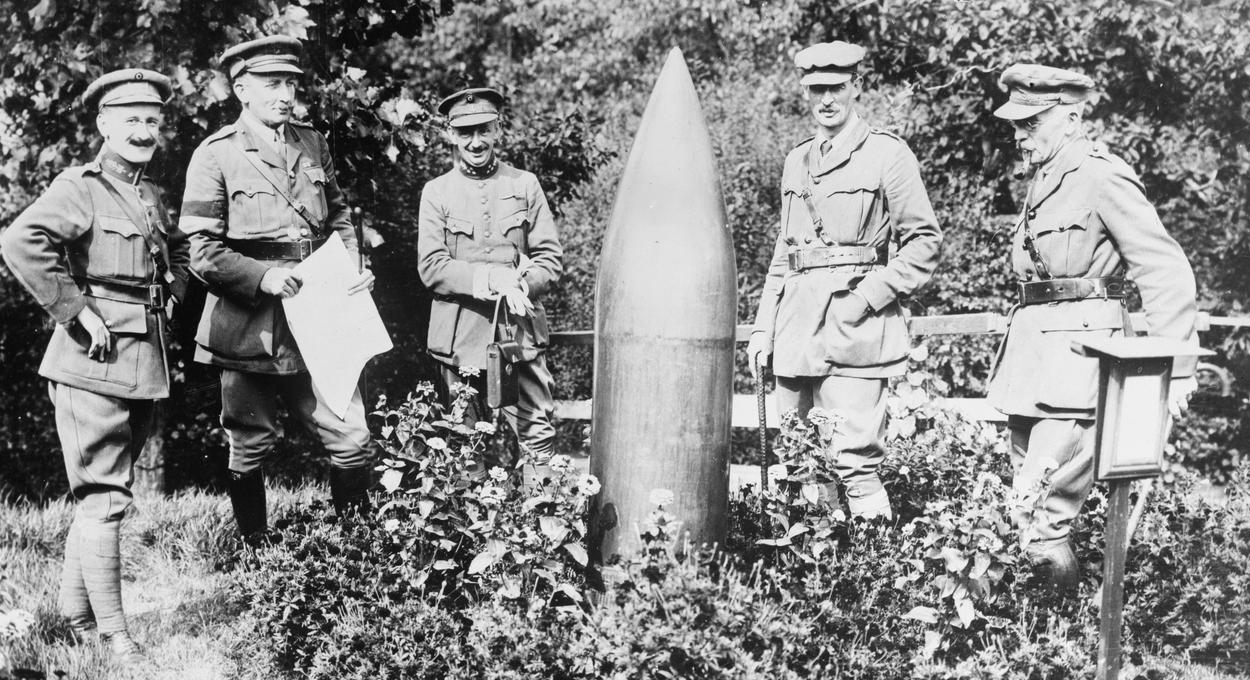
Robinson at far right, September 1917

Sir Harry Perry Robinson KBE (30 November 1859 – 20 December 1930) was a British writer and journalist born in British India. He worked for a while in the US and served as a war correspondent during World War I. He also accompanied the Prince of Wales on his tour of India in 1921.

== Life and work ==
Robinson was born in Chunar to army chaplain Julian Robinson and Harriet Woodcocke, daughter of Thomas Sharpe, Vicar of Doncaster. His older brothers were the writer Philip Stewart Robinson and the naturalist Edward Kay Robinson. He was sent home to Cheltenham in 1861 and went to school at Westminster School before joining Christ Church, Oxford. He graduated in 1882 with honours in literae humaniores. He went to the US where he became a journalist for the New York Tribune, moving to Idaho during the Gold Rush. In 1884 he moved to the Minneapolis Tribune and in 1887 he edited the Northwestern Railroader. In 1895 he published a novel Men Born Equal and in 1896 he campaigned for William McKinley. He moved to England in 1900 and managed the publishing firm of Isbister and Co before it went insolvent four years later. Robinson became a war correspondent for The Times and his time on the French front led to a book The Turning Point (1917). For his work during the war, he was knighted in 1920. He also accompanied the Prince of Wales to India in 1921–22. He reported from the Paris Olympics of 1924 and was present in Egypt during the opening of the tomb of Tutankhamun.

Robinson married Mary Lowry in Minneapolis in 1891 and they had two children who died young. Mary divorced him after he moved to England and in 1905 he married Florence Anne Tester and they had a son. He died of pneumonia in Somerset and was cremated at Bristol.
