= George Sim =

George Sim may refer to:

- George Charles Sim (1847–1922), journalist and member of the Queensland Legislative Assembly
- George Hamilton Sim (1852–1929), British Army officer and footballer who played for the Royal Engineers A.F.C.
- George Gall Sim (1878–1930), British administrator in India
