= 1926 Birthday Honours =

British government recognitions

The 1926 Birthday Honours were appointments by King George V to various orders and honours to reward and highlight good works by citizens of the British Empire. The appointments were made to celebrate the official birthday of The King on 3 June, but it was announced on 20 May that due to the national strike, the King had approved the Prime Minister's recommendation to delay the publication of the list until 3 July 1926. The honours were effective to 5 June 1926. Per standard practice, Sir Paul Chater, who died 27 May 1926, still received the honour of Knight Commander of the Order of the British Empire as he would have received the honour if he had survived.

The recipients of honours are displayed here as they were styled before their new honour, and arranged by honour, with classes (Knight, Knight Grand Cross, etc.) and then divisions (Military, Civil, etc.) as appropriate.

== United Kingdom and British Empire ==
=== Viscount ===
- Captain Courtenay Charles Evan, Baron Tredegar CBE VD JP DL RNVR For public and political services.

=== Baron ===
- Henry Seymour Berry DL by the name, title and style of Baron Buckland, of Bwlch in the County of Brecon. For public, political and philanthropic services.

=== Privy Councillor ===
The King appointed the following to His Majesty's Most Honourable Privy Council:

- Colonel John Gretton CBE JP MP Member of Parliament for South Derbyshire. 1895–1906; for Rutland, 1907–1918; for Burton since December 1918. For political and public services.
- Sir Halford John Mackinder, Chairman of the Imperial Shipping and Imperial Economic Committees. First Principal of University College, Reading, now the University of Reading
- Richard William Alan, Earl of Onslow OBE JP DL Under Secretary for War. For public services.

=== Baronetcies ===
- Sir Arthur Shirley Benn KBE MP Member of Parliament for Plymouth, Drake Division, since December 1910. President, Association of British Chambers of Commerce 1921–22 and 1922–23. For political and public services.
- Colonel Henry Ferryman Bowles TD JP DL Chairman or President, Enfield Conservative Association 1885–1926; Member of Parliament for the Enfield Division, 1889–1906 and 1918–22. For public and political services.
- Brigadier General Robert Gordon Gordon-Gilmour CB CVO DSO JP DL of Liberton and Craigmillar. President of the Scottish Unionist Association. Convener of the Eastern Divisional Council of the Scottish Unionist Association. For political and public services.
- James Augustus Grant JP DL MP Member of Parliament, Egremont Division 1910–18; Whitehaven Division 1918–22; Derby South since October 1924. For political and public services.
- Colonel John Wakefield Weston JP DL Member of Parliament for South Westmorland, 1913–18, and Westmorland, 1918–24. Chairman of County Council from 1908 till present time. For political and public services.
- Lieutenant-Colonel Godfrey Dalrymple White MP Member of Parliament for Southport 1910–1923 and since 1924. For political and public services.

=== Knight Bachelor ===
- Edward Tindal Atkinson KC Railway and Canal Commissioner since 1919
- Herbert Baker ARA FRIBA In recognition of his services to art
- Alderman John Bickerstaffe DL Was Chairman and Leader of the Conservative Party in Blackpool for over 20 years. Member of the Borough Council for 46 years. For political and public services.
- Major Archibald Boyd Boyd-Carpenter JP MP Member of Parliament for North Bradford 1918–1923 and for Coventry since 1924. Parliamentary Secretary, Ministry of Labour 1922–23; Financial Secretary to the Treasury and Paymaster General 1923 Parliamentary and Financial Secretary, Admiralty, July 1923 till January 1924. For political and public services.
- Alexander Keith Carlyon JP DL President, Harrow Conservative Association, 1919–25. Chairman of the Hendon Bench. For political and public services.
- Brigadier General George Kynaston Cockerill CB MP Member of Parliament for the Reigate Division since 1918. For political and public services.
- Henry Coward Conductor of the Sheffield Musical Union
- James Inglis Davidson, Director of the Scottish Chamber of Agriculture. For public services.
- Edwin Dodd, In recognition of his long services to the Shaftesbury Society and Ragged School Union
- William Edward Dudley OBE DL For public services. Director of the Co-operative Wholesale Society of Manchester. President of the Co-operative Congress 1925–6
- Alfred Henry Evans MRCS JP Member of the Unionist Association of the Tamworth Division since 1895 and President and Chairman since 1920. For political and public services.
- Lieutenant Colonel Charles Henry Brabazon Heaton-Ellis CBE DL Chairman of the Hitchin Division Conservative Association for about 20 years. Member of Herts County Council 1903–19. For political and public services.
- Captain Houston French CVO Lieutenant, Yeomen of the Guard
- George Rowland Hill, for over 37 years Chairman of the Greenwich Conservative Association. London County Council (LCC) Member for Greenwich 1922–25. For political and public services.
- Francis Eden Lacey, Secretary to Marylebone Cricket Club since 1898
- Colonel Henry George Lyons FRS Director and Secretary of the Science Museum
- Stanley Machin JP President of the Association of British Chambers of Commerce. For public services.
- Lawrence Margerison CBE Secretary to the National Savings Committee
- Lieutenant-Colonel Francis Kennedy McClean. In recognition of his services to aviation
- Christopher George Musgrave JP Chairman of the Metropolitan Water Board. For public services.
- William Haldane Porter CB Chief Inspector, Aliens Branch, Home Office
- Lieutenant-Colonel Assheton Pownall OBE TD MP Member of Parliament for East Lewisham since 1918. For political and public services.
- Ernest Victor Buckley Rutherford OBE For public services.
- George Shedden JP President, Isle of Wight Conservative and Unionist Association since 1922. For political and public services.
- Andrew Thomas Taylor JP Mayor of Hampstead 1922–23. LCC Member for Hampstead since 1908. Vice-Chairman of the LCC 1919–20. For public and political services.

British India

- Lallubhai Shamaldas Mehta CIE lately temporary Member of the Executive Council, Bombay
- Justice Philip Lindsay Buckland, Puisne Judge, High Court of Judicature, Calcutta
- Justice Cecil Walsh KC Puisne Judge, High Court of Judicature, Allahabad
- Ganendro Prosad Roy, Director-General of Posts and Telegraphs
- Colonel Gordon Risley Hearn CIE DSO Agent, Eastern Bengal Railway
- Robert McLean, Agent, Great Indian Peninsula Railway
- Lieutenant-Colonel Bradford Leslie OBE Royal Engineers, Chairman, Madras Port Trust
- Phiroze Cursetjee Sethna OBE Manager, Sun Life Assurance Company of Canada, Bombay
- Raj Bahadur Purohit Gopi Nath CIE Member of the Jaipur Council of State
- Brajendranath Seal Vice-Chancellor of Mysore University
- Walter Stuart James Willson, Member of the Legislative Assembly
- Khan Bahadur Ebrahim Haroon Jaffer, Member of the Council of State
- John Walter Hose CSI Indian Civil Service (retired), attached Public and Judicial Department, India Office

Dominions

- George Mason Allard, Representative of the Government of the Commonwealth of Australia on, and Chairman of, the Amalgamated Wireless Company, in recognition also of his services to the Commonwealth Government in connection with banking and financial matters.
- George Fairbairn, Agent-General in London for the State of Victoria
- Frank Fox OBE Secretary of the Fellowship of the British Empire Exhibition; in recognition of his services to the Empire
- Charles Holdsworth, Managing Director Of the Union Steamship Company of New Zealand Ltd., recognition of his services in the development of New Zealand
- The Hon. Charles Ernest Statham, Speaker of the House of Representatives, Dominion of New Zealand

Colonies, Protectorates, etc.

- Fiennes Cecil Arthur Barrett-Lennard, Chief Justice of the Supreme Court of Jamaica
- Henry Hessey Johnston Gompertz, Chief Justice, Federated Malay States
- Edward Allan Grannum CMG Colonial Secretary, Mauritius
- William Henry Himbury, General Manager, British Cotton Growing Association
- William Morrison, Member of the Privy Council of, and Nominated Member of the Legislative Council of Jamaica; in recognition of his public services.

=== The Most Honourable Order of the Bath ===
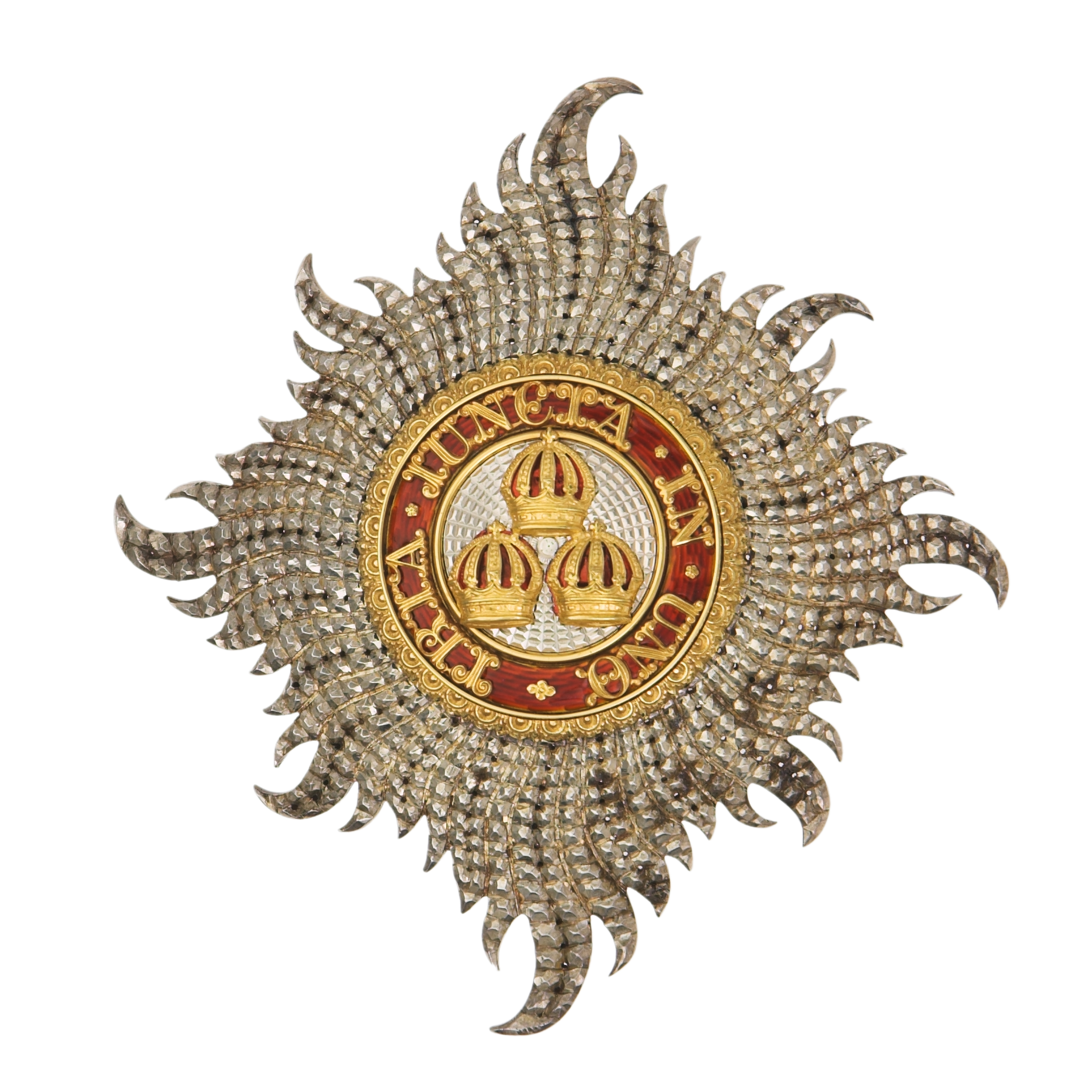
Civilian star of the Knight Grand Cross of the Order of the Bath

==== Knight Grand Cross of the Order of the Bath (GCB) ====
===== Military Division =====
Army

- General Sir Claud William Jacob KCB KCSI KCMG Indian Army, Military Secretary, India Office, late General Officer Commanding-in-Chief, Northern Command, India

===== Civil Division =====
- The Rt. Hon. Sir Herbert Louis Samuel GBE For public services.

==== Knight Commander of the Order of the Bath (KCB) ====
===== Military Division =====
Royal Navy

- Vice-Admiral Sir Rudolf Walter Bentinck KCMG CB
- Vice-Admiral Herbert William Richmond CB

Army

- Lieutenant-General Sir John Sharman Fowler KCMG CB DSO Colonel Commandant, Royal Corps of Signals
- Major-General Henry Leycester Croker CB CMG
- Major-General Pomeroy Holland-Pryor CB CMG DSO MVO Indian Army, Deputy Adjutant and Quartermaster-General, Southern Command, India
- Major-General Harrington Owen Parr CB CMG Indian Army, late Military Secretary, Army Headquarters, India

===== Civil Division =====
- William John Berry CB Director of Naval Construction, Admiralty
- William Montagu Graham-Harrison CB Secondary Parliamentary Counsel

==== Companion of the Order of the Bath (CB) ====
===== Military Division =====
Royal Navy

- Engineer Rear Admiral George William Baldwin CBE
- Captain Thomas Erskine Wardle DSO ADC
- Captain Alister Francis Beal CMG ADC
- Surgeon Captain Reginald St. George Smallridge Bond FRCS
- Lieutenant-Colonel George Leonard Raikes DSC Royal Marines

Army

- Major-General Robert Strickland Hannay CMG DSO KHS Deputy Director of Medical Services, Southern Command
- Major-General Charles Bonham-Carter CMG DSO General Staff, Eastern-Command
- Colonel Henry Richardson Peck CMG DSO Commanding Royal Artillery, 2nd Division, Aldershot
- Colonel Cuthbert Graham Fuller CMG DSO Brigade Commander, Canal Brigade, Egypt
- Colonel George Hanbury Noble Jackson CMG DSO Brigade Commander, 7th Infantry Brigade
- Colonel Frank Walter Wilson CMG FRCVS Assistant Director of Veterinary Services, Eastern Command
- Major-General Ernest Frederick Orton, Indian Army, Officiating Deputy Adjutant and Quartermaster-General, Southern Command, India
- Colonel Dennis Deane DSO Indian Army, Commander, Ambala Brigade Area, India
- Colonel Frederick Stewart Keen DSO Indian Army, Commandant, Small Arms School, India

Royal Air Force

- Air Commodore Thomas Charles Reginald Higgins CMG

===== Civil Division =====
- Rear-Admiral John Ernest Troyte Harper MVO
- Frank Edward Smith CBE FRS Director of Scientific Research, Admiralty
- Colonel Richard Edgar Sugden CMG DSO TD Territorial Army, Brigade Commander, 147th (2nd West Riding) Infantry Brigade, Territorial Army
- George Clarke Simpson CBE FRS Director of the Meteorological Office
- John Wentworth Garneys Bond, Head of the Journal Office in the House of Commons
- William Cecil Bottomley CMG OBE Assistant Secretary, Colonial Office
- William Richard Codling CVO CBE Controller, H.M. Stationery Office
- Bernard Montagu Draper, Director of Finance, War Office
- Rupert Beswicke Howorth, Assistant Secretary, Cabinet Office
- John Stewart Stewart-Wallace, Chief Land Registrar, H.M. Land Registry

=== The Most Exalted Order of the Star of India ===
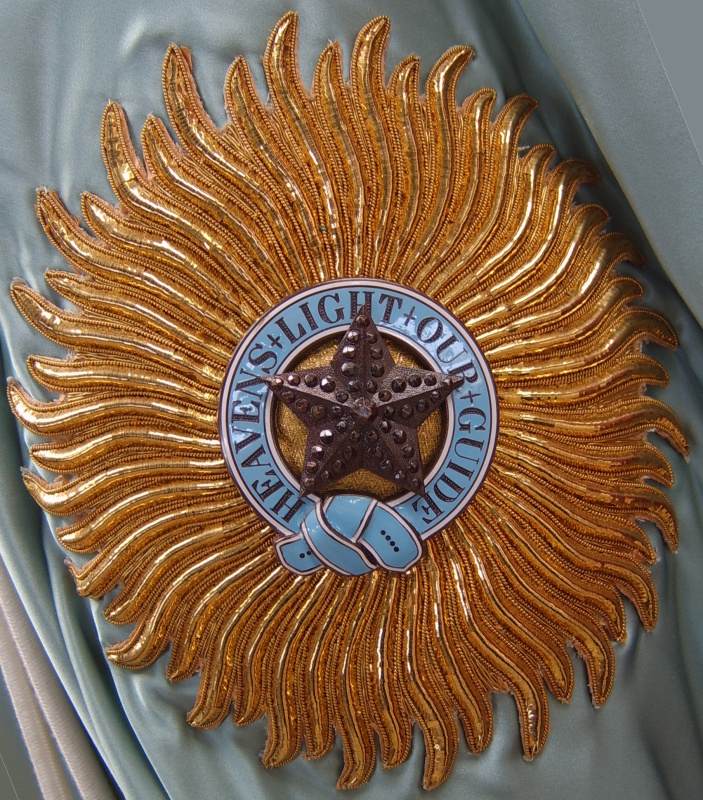
Star of a Knight Grand Commander of the Most Exalted Order of the Star of India

==== Knight Commander (KCSI) ====
- Sir Alexander Phillips Muddiman CSI CIE Indian Civil Service, Member of the Governor-General's Executive Council

==== Companion (CSI) ====
- Arthur William Botham CIE Indian Civil Service, Member of the Executive Council, Assam
- George Gall Sim CIE Indian Civil Service, Financial Commissioner of Railways
- Leonard Birley CIE Indian Civil Service, Chief Secretary to the Government of Bengal
- Neil Macmichael, Indian Civil Service, Member, Board of Revenue, Madras

=== The Most Distinguished Order of Saint Michael and Saint George ===
Star of the Order of Saint Michael and Saint George

==== Knight Grand Cross of the Order of St Michael and St George (GCMG) ====
- His Excellency the Rt. Hon. Sir Ronald William Graham GCVO KCMG CB His Majesty's Ambassador Extraordinary and Plenipotentiary at Rome
- His Excellency the Rt. Hon. Sir Ronald Charles Lindsay KCMG CB CVO His Majesty's Ambassador Extraordinary and Plenipotentiary in Turkey
- Sir Charles Murray Marling KCMG CB His Majesty's Envoy Extraordinary and Minister Plenipotentiary at the Hague

==== Knight Commander of the Order of St Michael and St George (KCMG) ====
- Colonel Sir Alexander MacCormick Kt a leading Surgeon in Australia; in recognition of his services to the Commonwealth of Australia
- Sir Donald Charles Cameron KBE CMG Governor and Commander-in-Chief, Tanganyika Territory
- Brigadier-General Sir Gilbert Falkingham Clayton KBE CB CMG For services rendered in concluding agreements with the Sultan of Nejd and for the conduct of a mission to the Imam of the Yemen
- Charles Strachey CB Assistant Undersecretary of State, Colonial Office
- The Hon. Francis Oswald Lindley CB CBE His Majesty's Envoy Extraordinary and Minister Plenipotentiary at Oslo
- The Hon. Sir Odo William Theophilus Villiers Russell KCVO CB His Majesty's Envoy Extraordinary and Minister Plenipotentiary to the Holy See
- Victor Alexander Augustus Henry Wellesley CB Deputy Under-Secretary of State, Foreign Office

Honorary Knight Commander

- Abdul Mushin Beg Al-Sa'dun, Prime Minister of Iraq

==== Companion of the Order of St Michael and St George (CMG) ====
- Lawrence Arthur Adamson FRGS Headmaster of Wesley College, Melbourne, Member of the Council of Melbourne University; in recognition of his services to Education in the State of Victoria
- The Reverend Ronald George MacIntyre OBE Professor of Systematic Theology, St. Andrew's College, Sydney University; in recognition of his services to the Commonwealth of Australia
- John Sutherland Ross, of the City of Dunedin, Chairman of Directors of the New Zealand and South Seas Exhibition, Dominion of New Zealand
- Harold Livingstone Tapley, Member of the House of Representatives, Dominion of New Zealand, Mayor of the City of Dunedin, and a Director of the New Zealand and South Seas Exhibition
- Edgar Wrigley Cozens-Hardy, General Manager of the Government Railways, Gold Coast
- Herbert Layard Dowbiggin, Inspector-General of Police, Ceylon
- Arthur William Hill FRS Director, Royal Botanic Gardens, Kew
- Richard Nosworthy, Collector-General, Jamaica
- Major Henry Cecil Prescott CIE Inspector-General of Police, Iraq
- John Owen Shircore Director of Medical and Sanitary Services, Tanganyika Territory
- Richard Olaf Winstedt Director of Education, Straits Settlements and Federated Malay States
- The Hon. Alexander George Montagu Cadogan, a First Secretary in the Foreign Office
- Reginald Hervey Hoare, Counsellor of Embassy in His Majesty's Diplomatic Service, Constantinople
- Harold Porter, Acting British Consul-General at Hankow
- Oswald Longstaff Prowde, Resident Engineer, Sennar Dam

=== The Most Eminent Order of the Indian Empire ===
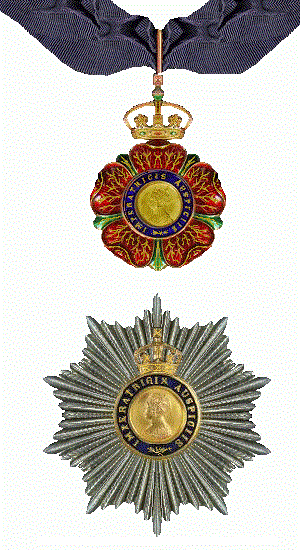
Riband, badge and star of the Knight Grand Commander of the Order of the Indian Empire

==== Knight Commander (KCIE) ====
- Raja Panaganti Ramarayaningar, Raja of Panagal, Minister for Local Self-Government, Madras
- John Perronet Thompson CSI Indian Civil Service, Political Secretary to the Government of India, Foreign and Political Department
- Sir Geoffrey Fitzhervey de Montmorency KCVO CIE CBE Indian Civil Service, Private Secretary to His Excellency the Viceroy

==== Companion (CIE) ====
- Edward Herbert Kealy, Indian Civil Service, Resident, Baroda
- M. R. Ry. Tiruvalangadu Raja Sastri Venkatarama Sastriyar Avargal, Advocate-General, Madras
- Miles Irving OBE Indian Civil Service, Financial Secretary to Government, Punjab
- Harry Oliver Baron Shoubridge, Chief Engineer, Public Works Department, Bombay
- Colonel Krishnaji Vishnoo Kukday, Indian Medical Service, Inspector-General of Civil Hospitals, Central Provinces
- Samuel Walter Goode, Indian Civil Service, Officiating Chairman of the Calcutta Improvement Trust
- Arthur Harold Walter Bentinck, Indian Civil Service, Deputy Commissioner of Sylhet, Assam
- Harry Llewellyn Lyons Allanson, Indian Civil Service, District and Sessions Judge, Bihar and Orissa
- Khan Bahadur Pirzada Muhammad Hosain, late District and Sessions Judge, Delhi
- William Henry Albert Webster, Commissioner of Police, Kangoon
- Raj Bahadur Hementa Kumar Raha, Deputy Director-General of Post Offices, India
- John Collard Bernard Drake OBE Indian Civil Service, Secretary to the High Commissioner for India
- Lieutenant-Colonel Thomas William Harley, Indian Medical Service, District Medical and Sanitary Officer and Superintendent, Medical School, Madura, Madras
- George Clark, Director of Agriculture, United Provinces
- Major Donald George Sandeman, Indian Army, North-West Frontier Intelligence Bureau
- Hormasji Jehangir Bhabha, late Inspector-General of Education, Mysore State
- Sardar Mir Masud Alum Khan, Nawab of Belha, Bombay
- Khwaja Nazim-ud-Din, Member of the Bengal Legislative Council, Chairman of Dacca Municipality
- Alfred Cooper Woollier, Dean of University Instruction, Lahore
- Alfred Lawrence Covernton, Principal and Professor of English Literature, Elphinstone College, Bombay
- Percy Saville Burrell, Professor of Philosophy, Allahabad University
- Girja Shankar Bajpai CBE Indian Civil Service, Secretary of recent Deputation from the Government of India to South Africa

=== The Royal Victorian Order ===
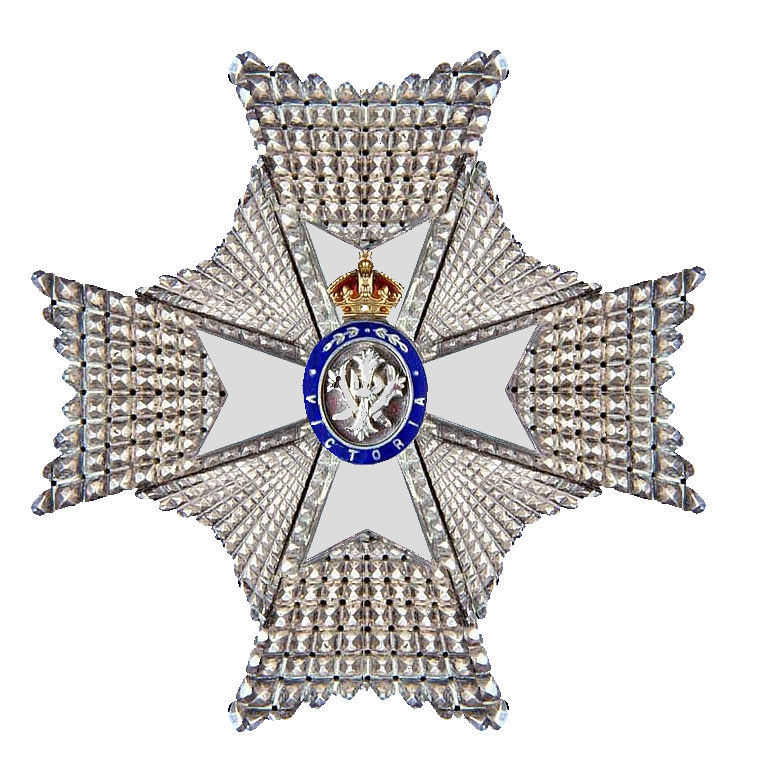
Insignia of a Knight / Dames Commander of the Royal Victorian Order

==== Knight Grand Cross of the Royal Victorian Order (GCVO) ====
- Admiral The Hon. Sir Edmund Robert Fremantle GCB CMG (dated 31 May 1926)
- Major-General Sir John Hanbury-Williams KCB KCVO CMG

==== Knight Commander of the Royal Victorian Order (KCVO) ====
- The Hon. John William Fortescue CVO (dated 16 June 1926)
- Victor George Seymour Corkran CVO
- John Murray CVO
- Herbert Edward Mitchell CVO

==== Commander of the Royal Victorian Order (CVO) ====
- Major The Hon. Arthur Hay MVO
- Brigadier-General Gerald Frederic Trotter CB CMG CBE DSO MVO
- William John Hocking CBE
- Lieutenant-Colonel Granville Cecil Douglas-Gordon DSO
- The Reverend Canon Arthur Rowland Harry Grant MVO
- Noel Curtis-Bennett
- Ernest Clarke FRCS
- John Berkeley Monck
- John Weir

==== Member of the Royal Victorian Order, 4th class (MVO) ====
- Edwin Charles Cox CBE
- Major Frank Melvin Matthews OBE
- Robert Burns Robertson MVO (Fifth Class)
- Thomas Francis Vaughan Prickard

==== Member of the Royal Victorian Order, 5th class (MVO) ====
- George Herbert Smith

=== The Most Excellent Order of the British Empire ===
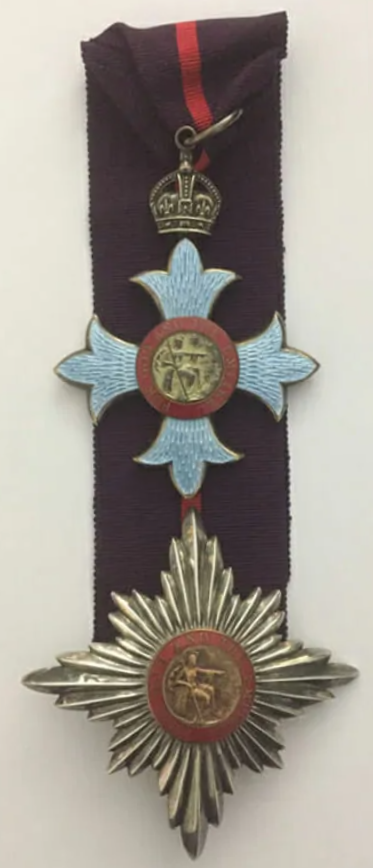
Knight Commander of the Order of the British Empire, insignia 1917–35

==== Dame Grand Cross of the Order of the British Empire (GBE) ====
- Christina Allen Massey CBE for services to the Dominion of New Zealand

==== Knight Grand Cross of the Order of the British Empire (GBE) ====
===== Military Division =====
Royal Navy

- Admiral Sir Frederic Edward Errington Brock KCMG CB (Retired)

===== Civil Division =====
- The Rt. Hon. John Poynder, Baron Islington GCMG DSO Retiring Chairman of the National Savings Committee
- Sir William Warrender Mackenzie KBE KC late President of the Industrial Court
- Almeric Hugh, Baron Queenborough. For public services.

==== Dame Commander of the Order of the British Empire (DBE) ====
- Madge Kendal-Grimston. For services to the drama.
- Agnes Gwendoline Hunt RRC Founder and supporter of the Shropshire Orthopaedic Hospital
- The Hon. Maude Agnes Lawrence, Director of Women Establishments, H.M. Treasury
- Jessie Percy Butler Wilton Phipps DL For services to Education
- Mary Ann Dacomb Scharlieb CBE MS Consulting Gynaecologist, Royal Free Hospital

==== Knight Commander of the Order of the British Empire (KBE) ====
===== Military Division =====
Royal Navy

- Vice-Admiral Edward Buxton Kiddle CB (Retired)

Army

- Major General Cyril John Deverell CB British Service, late General Officer Commanding, United Provinces District, India

Royal Air Force

- Air Vice-Marshal John Miles Steel CB CMG CBE

===== Civil Division =====
- Walter MacArthur Allen CBE Commandant-in-Chief, Metropolitan Special Constabulary
- Max Julius Bonn CBE Chairman of the London Advisory Committee for Juvenile Employment. For public services.
- Sir Frank Watson Dyson Astronomer Royal
- Ernest Arthur Gowers CB Permanent Under Secretary for Mines
- Charles Hipwood CB Principal Assistant Secretary, Board of Trade
- Mark Webster Jenkinson CBE For services to the War Office in connection with Army Accounting
- Captain Arthur Henry Rostron CBE RNR Captain of the RMS Mauretania
- Professor William Somerville FLS FRSE FSS late-Sibthorpian Professor of Rural Economy, University of Oxford. For services to Agricultural Education and Research
- Sir Percy Woodhouse JP DL Chairman, Manchester Conservative and Unionist Association. For political and public services.
- Alexander Kemp Wright CBE Vice-Chairman, Scottish National Savings Committee

British India

- Nasarvanji Navroji Wadia CIE Mill-owner, Bombay
- George Frederick Paddison CSI Indian Civil Service, Chairman of recent Deputation from the Government of India to South Africa

Diplomatic Service and Overseas List

- Sidney Barton CMG His Majesty's Consul-General at Shanghai
- Reginald Stewart Patterson CBE Financial Adviser to the Egyptian Government

Dominions

- The Honourable John Robert Bennett, Colonial Secretary, Newfoundland
- The Hon. Francis Grenville Clarke President of the Legislative Council, State of Victoria
- James Oswald Fairfax CBE of the City of Sydney, Chairman of the Australian Section of the Empire Press Union; in recognition of his services to the Commonwealth of Australia

Colonies, Protectorates, etc.

- Captain Cecil Hamilton Armitage CMG DSO Governor and Commander-in-Chief of the Colony of the Gambia
- Thomas Alexander Vans Best CMG CBE Lieutenant-Governor of the Island of Malta, lately Colonial Secretary, Colony of Trinidad and Tobago
- Sir Catchick Paul Chater Kt CMG In recognition of his public services in the Colony of Hong Kong (posthumous)

Honorary Knight Commander

- Elly Silas Kadoorie, in recognition of his services in the cause of charity and education in Iraq and Palestine

==== Commander of the Order of the British Empire (CBE) ====
===== Military Division =====
Royal Navy

- Head Sister Margaret Helen Keenan RRC Queen Alexandra's Royal Naval Nursing Service
- Paymaster-Captain Frederick George Motton RN
- Captain Charles Mahon Readhead DSO RD RNR
- Captain George-Francis Hyde RAN

Army

- Colonel Jacob Waley-Cohen CMG DSO TD Territorial Army
- Major and Brevet Lieutenant-Colonel Richard Conway Dobbs DSO The Royal Irish Fusiliers (Princess Victoria's) and Lieutenant-Colonel Commanding 1st (Nyasaland) Battalion, The King's African Rifles
- Colonel John Frederic Charles Fuller DSO Military Assistant (General Staff Officer), Department of the Chief of the Imperial General Staff, War Office
- Chief Lady Superintendent Marion Domville Knapp RRC Queen Alexandra's Military Nursing Service for India
- Lieutenant-Colonel Charles Richard Henry Palmer Landon DSO Commandant 10/20th Burma Rifles, Indian Army
- Lieutenant-Colonel Alexander Charles Broughton Mackinnon, 2/2nd King Edward's Own Gurkha Rifles (The Sirmoor Rifles), Indian Army
- Colonel George Colleymore Sturrock, Director of Ordnance Factories and Manufacture Master General of Supply Branch, Army Headquarters, India
- Colonel Walter King Venning CMG MC Assistant Adjutant General, War Office
- The Reverend Francis Joseph Walker Royal Army Chaplains' Department, Assistant Chaplain General, Eastern Command
- Colonel Richard Stephen Murray-White DSO Brigade Commander, 156th (West Scottish) Infantry Brigade, Territorial
- Colonel Maurice Lean Wilkinson, Commandant Artillery College

Royal Air Force

- Wing Commander Frank Howard Kirby VC OBE DCM

===== Civil Division =====
- Albert Abbott, Chief Inspector of Technical and Continuation Schools, Board of Education
- James Barrie, Chairman of the Glasgow Savings Committee
- John Joseph Bickersteth OBE late Clerk of the Peace and Clerk of the County Council, East Riding of Yorkshire
- Christopher Llewellyn Bullock OBE Principal Private Secretary to the Secretary of State for Air
- Hamilton Conacher, Permanent Secretary, Ministry of Labour, Northern Ireland
- James Vincent Coyle, Assistant Secretary, Ministry of Agriculture, Northern Ireland
- Colonel Edward William Crawford DSO late Colonel, Corps of Military Accountants
- Ernest Tristram Crutchley OBE Acting Finance Officer, Oversea Settlement Department of the Dominions Office
- Arthur Edwin Cutforth, Member of the firm of Deloitte, Plender, Griffiths & Co., Chartered Accountants. For public services.
- George Selby Washington Epps, Principal Actuary, Government Actuary's Department
- Lilian Mary Faithfull JP Principal of Cheltenham Ladies College, 1907–1922
- William John Gibson, Rector of the Nicolson Institute, Stornoway, Isle of Lewis
- Edythe Mary Glanville The first woman to be elected Vice-Chairman of the Metropolitan Division of the National Union of Conservative and Unionist Associations. In 1920 elected to the N.U.A Executive and re-elected annually. For political and public services.
- Haywood Temple Holmes MVO ISO Accountant, H.M. Treasury
- William George Hunter, Deputy Accountant-General, Ministry of Health
- Captain Fullarton James OBE Chief Constable of Northumberland
- George Henry Kingston OBE Assistant Director of Army Contracts
- John Lindsay Mackie, Assistant Secretary, Board of Customs and Excise
- William Owen Owen, Divisional Controller, Wales, Ministry of Labour
- Philip Palmer OBE Manager, Constructive Department, Chatham Dockyard
- James Martin Ritchie, Chairman of the Bridge ton Local Employment Committee
- Sir George Royle OBE JP FRGS For voluntary services in connection with the National Savings Committee
- Benjamin James Saunders JP Chairman of Brighton, Horsham and District War Pensions Committee
- Andrew Donnan Smith, Chief Constable of Glasgow
- William Alexander Valentine, Controller, London Telephone Service
- Hilda Frances Zigomala. For services in connection with Lord Roberts Workshops

British India

- Sir Deva Prasad Sarvadhikary CIE Member of recent Deputation from the Government of India to South Africa
- Saiyid Raza Ah, Member oi the Council of State Member of recent Deputation from the Government of India to South Africa
- Harry Tonkinson CIE Indian Civil Service, Joint Secretary to the Government of India, Home Department
- Lieutenant-Colonel Edmond Henry Salt James CIE Revenue and Judicial Commissioner, Baluchistan
- Lieutenant-Colonel Wingate Wemyss Muir MVO OBE Indian Army, Comptroller, Viceregal Household
- Captain Victor Felix Gamble CIE lately Private Secretary to His Excellency the Governor of Burma
- Victor Bayley CIE Superintendent of Works, Khyber Railway
- Henry Joseph Trivess Smith, Engineer, Tansa Completion Works, Bombay Municipality

Diplomatic Service and Overseas List

- Henry Montesquieu Anthony, Director-General of the State Domains Administration, Egyptian Government
- Robert Allason Furnes, late Oriental Secretary at Cairo
- Edgar George Jamieson, Acting British Consul at Shanghai
- Claude Cecil Augustus Kirke, His Majesty's Consul at Swatow
- Francis Alfred Oliver, His Majesty's Consul-General at Hamburg

Dominions

- Gertrude Drayton OBE Secretary of the Victoria League
- Charles Samuel Nathan, of the City of Perth, Western Australia, in recognition of his services to the Commonwealth of Australia
- Colonel Percy Thomas Owen OBE Director-General of Works, Commonwealth of Australia, Chief Engineer under the-Federal Capital Commission
- The Hon. John Warburton Pennington, Member of the Legislative Assembly, State of Victoria, formerly Member of the Ministry of that State
- Samuel Hurst Seager FRIBA a prominent Architect in the Dominion of New Zealand
- Charles Speight, Vice-Chairman of the New Zealand and South Seas Exhibition, Dominion of New Zealand
- William Charles Frederick Thomas, President of the Flour Millers Association, Victoria, Chairman of the Commonwealth Dried Fruits Control Board; in recognition, of his services to the Commonwealth of Australia
- Sir Philip Bourchier Sherard Wrey Bt Chief Commissioner for Southern Rhodesia at the British Empire Exhibition 1924–25

Colonies, Protectorates, etc.

- Captain James Davidson, lately Senior Resident, Southern Provinces, Nigeria
- Charles Cuthbert Harward AMICE Divisional Irrigation Engineer, Ceylon
- Colonel George Wykeham Heron DSO OBE MRCS LRCP Royal Army Medical Corps, (Retired), Director of the Department of Health, Palestine
- Captain (local Lieutenant-Colonel) Frederick Gerald Peake OBE Officer Commanding the Arab Legion, Trans-Jordan
- John Henry Matthews Robson, Unofficial Member of the Federal Council, Federated Malay States
- Frédéric Melchior Louis Rouillard KC Unofficial Member of the Council of Government, Mauritius
- Stanley Rivers-Smith OBE Director of Education, Tanganyika Territory
- Lionel Maynard Swan, Chief Secretary to the Ministry of Finance, Iraq
- Henry Barclay Walcott CMG Treasurer, Colony of Trinidad and Tobago; represented to the Colony at the Trade Conference at Ottawa, 1925
- The Reverend Arthur West Wilkie, Head of the Scottish Mission, Gold Coast; in recognition of his services to education

Honorary Commanders

- Dato Abdullah bin Jaafar, the Dato Mentri Besar of Johore, Malay States
- Dato Klana Petra, Mamor, Undang of Sungei Ujong, Negri Sembilan, Federated Malay States

==== Officer of the Order of the British Empire (OBE) ====
===== Military Division =====
Royal Navy

- Commander Guy Onslow Lydekker DSC
- Lieutenant-Commander Napier Robert Peploe
- Engineer-Commander Edgar William Riley
- Major Arthur Charles Barnby RM
- Commander Norman Ffolliott Wells VD RNVR

Army

- Captain and Brevet Major Philip Alexander Arden, Royal Army Service Corps, Adjutant, Royal Army Service Corps Training College, Aldershot
- Major Walter Richard Barker, The Duke of Cornwall's Light Infantry (attached Sudan Defence Force)
- Captain Alan Bruce Blaxland, 1/7th Rajput Regiment, Indian Army
- Temp. Captain William Bligh Royal Army Medical Corps
- Lieutenant-Colonel The Hon. Stuart Pleydell-Bouverie DSO TD 52nd (London) Anti-Aircraft Brigade, Royal Artillery, Territorial Army
- Lieutenant-Colonel Henry Robert Brown, Indian Medical Service
- Major William Egan DSO Royal Army Medical Corps (Deputy Assistant Director of Medical Services, Scottish Command)
- Captain Rowland Eustace, 1/18th Royal Garhwal Bines, Indian Army
- Captain Richard James Rolleston Freeth MC Royal Artillery, attached Iraq Levies
- Lieutenant Francis Gordon Griffith MBE North Western Railway Regiment, Auxiliary Force, India
- Lieutenant-Colonel Frederic Snowden Hammond DSO 11th London Regiment (Finsbury Rifles), Territorial Army
- Major Archibald Gordon Rainsford-Hannay DSO Royal Engineers
- Major Charles Henry Hasler Harold Royal Army Medical Corps, Assistant Instructor, graded as Deputy Assistant Director of Hygiene, Aldershot
- Quartermaster and Lieutenant-Colonel Thomas Arthur Heath MBE Deputy Assistant Director of Remounts, War Office
- Lieutenant-Colonel Edward Lancelot Wall Henslow MC Commandant, Army School of Physical Training, Aldershot
- The Reverend Walter Bertram Hughes Royal Army Chaplains' Department
- Lieutenant-Colonel William David Kenny, Regular Army Reserve of Officers, The Royal Inniskilling Fusiliers, attached Sudan Defence Force
- Major Charles James Seward le Cornu MC 13th Frontier Force Rifles, Indian Army (Commandant, Army Signal School, Poona)
- Captain Arthur John Rupert Marshall Leslie, Royal Artillery, late Commandant, Malay States Volunteer Regiment
- Major John Jestyn Llewellin MC Dorsetshire Heavy Brigade, Royal Artillery, Territorial Army
- Lieutenant-Colonel John Pemberton Heywood Heywood-Lonsdale DSO TD The Shropshire Yeomanry, Territorial Army
- Major William Cecil Lowe FRCVS Royal Army Veterinary Corps
- Captain Hubert Francis Lucas, Royal Engineers
- Lieutenant William Gunn Mackay MC Royal Artillery, lately serving with the local rank of Major in the Somaliland Camel Corps, The King's Africa n Rifles
- Captain John Wright Malcolm MC Royal Army Medical Corps, attached Iraq Levies
- Major Bernard Culmer Page TD Territorial Army, attached Royal Engineers, London District
- Major George Frederick Joseph Paterson MC Indian Army
- Quartermaster and Major Walter Thomas Price MC Extra Regimentally Employed List
- Major Edward Johnson Ross MC 1/8th Gurkha Rifles, Indian Army
- Captain Matthew Sheppard MC TD Yorkshire Dragoons (Queen's Own) Yeomanry, Territorial Army
- Lieutenant-Colonel William Simpkins TD 44th (Home Counties) Divisional Train, Royal Army Service Corps, Territorial Army
- Major and Brevet Lieutenant-Colonel Charles Edward Steel, Royal Army Veterinary Corps, lately Deputy Assistant Director of Veterinary Services, Northern Command, India
- Lieutenant-Colonel Robert Joseph Tucker Stewart, Supernumerary List, Indian Army
- Captain and Brevet Major Ernest John Bocart Tagg DSO The Durham Light Infantry, Deputy Assistant Quartermaster General, The British Army of the Rhine
- Major John Brereton Owst Trimble DSO MC The East Yorkshire Regiment, lately Commandant, Machine Gun School, India
- Lieutenant-Colonel Edward Price Warlters MC 54th (City of London) Anti-Aircraft Brigade, Royal Artillery, Territorial Army

Royal Air Force

- Flight Lieutenant Albert Wombwell

===== Civil Division =====
- James Henry Avison, Chief Accountant, Board of Customs and Excise
- William Archibald Basham, Principal, Ministry of Labour
- George Albert Baxandall, Divisional Inspector of Technical and Continuation Schools, Board of Education Cadet
- Lieutenant-Colonel Lancelot William Bennett VD Late Commanding Officer 1st Cadet Battalion, London Regiment (The Queen's). For valuable services to the Cadet Force.
- Jabez Berry, Retired Principal, Board of Inland Revenue
- Robert Thomson Birnie, Chief Constable of Forfarshire
- Felix John Blakemore, Chairman of Wolverhampton and District War Pensions Committee
- Harold Boughey, Deputy Divisional Controller, Midlands Division, Ministry of Labour
- Beatrice Rachael Stirling Boyd, Founder and Honorary Secretary, Edinburgh Children's Holiday Fund
- George Bryan, Senior Inspector of Audits, Ministry of Home Affairs, Northern Ireland
- Frederick Vango Burridge FRS Principal, LCC Central School of Arts and Crafts
- James Christie, Chief Constable of Greenock
- James Temple Cotton MBE Principal, Air Ministry
- John Philip Cross, Collector, Board of Customs and Excise
- Captain Rupert John Goodman Crouch, Head of Airworthiness Section, Royal Aircraft Establishment, Air Ministry
- Beatrice Mary Cumington, Woman Staff Inspector of Technical and Continuation Schools, Board of Education
- Edith Ellen Drysdale, Private Secretary to Commissioner of Metropolitan Police
- Alfred William Edwards, Deputy Controller, Central Telegraph Office
- Florence Dorothy Garner, Chief Superintendent of Women's Staff, Public Trustee Office
- James Simpson Godden, Principal Officer, Ministry of Labour, Northern Ireland
- Frances Ralph Gray JP High Mistress of St. Paul's Girls School
- Walter John Haines, Superintending Inspector, Board of Customs and Excise
- William Hayden, Principal (Acting), War Grace
- Thomas St. Quintin Hill, Principal Clerk, Food Section, Board of Trade
- James Jackson Superintendent, Salvage Department, Birmingham
- Frederick James, Chief Constable of Hastings
- William Hughes-Jones JP Chairman of the Anglesey Employment Committee
- Mary Elizabeth King, Member of the London Advisory Council for Juvenile Employment
- James Kirkwood JP Provost of Rutherglen. For public services.
- John Corbet McBride MBE Accident Manager, Commercial Union Assurance Company. For public services.
- Eric Machtig MBE Principal, Colonial Office
- George Frederick Mansbridge, Vice-Controller, Stores Department, General Post Office
- Arthur Killick Mayall, Chief Constable of Oldham
- Captain Charles Leonard Miskin, Registrar, Imperial War Graves Commission
- Henry Daniel Morgan, Chief Constable, 3 District, Metropolitan Police
- William Jackson Morton MBE JP Group Commandant, L and M Divisions, Special Constabulary
- William Suffield Felix Mylius, Assistant Secretary, Traffic Department, Metropolitan Police
- William Newman MBE Superintendent, Metropolitan Police
- Hedley Peters, JP Chief Officer of the Sittingbourne Fire Brigade. For public services.
- Zoe Lavallier Puxley, Principal, Ministry of Health
- Florence Quick, Member of Oxford and District War Pensions Committee
- Gilbert Scott Ram MIEE Senior Electrical Inspector of Factories, Home Office
- Percy Christopher Rice MBE Chief Establishment and Finance Officer, Department of Overseas Trade
- Mary Ritchie MBE Voluntary Worker under the National Savings Committee
- John Scott MBE Voluntary Worker under the National Savings Committee
- James Applegate Simes, Principal, Ministry of Pensions
- James Andrew Short, Collector, Board of Customs and Excise
- Robert John Smith, Head of Branch (Acting), Ministry of Health
- Ethel Mary Spiller. For voluntary services in connection with the Victoria and Albert Museum
- Edith Felicia Seymour Taylor, Private Secretary to the Attorney General
- Major Maurice Hilliard Tomlin, Chief Constable, Metropolitan Police
- William Thomas Towler, Chairman of the Stratford Local Employment Committee
- Edward White Wallis, Secretary of the Royal Sanitary Institute
- Archibald Ure Wotherspoon, Chairman of the Perth and Kinross War Pensions Committee

British India

- Sarclar Bahadur Sardar Haji Mahomed Khan, Sardar of the Shahwani tribe, Kalat State, Baluchistan
- M. R. Ry. Diwan Bahadur Saravana Bhavanandam Pillai Avargal ISO ex-Sheriff of Madras
- Sardar Saiyid Ali El Edrus, Sardar of Gujarat, Bombay
- Arthur Clement Sells, Principal, Robertson College, Jubbulpore, Central Provinces
- Anandrai Keshavlal Dalai FRCS LRCP Professor of Clinical and Operative Surgery, Grant Medical College, Bombay, and Surgeon, Jamsetjee Jeejeebhoy Hospital, Bombay
- Babu Bisheshwar Nam Srivastava, Vakil, High Court, and Chairman, Improvement Trust, Luck now
- Captain Archibald Douglas George Staunton Batty MVO Army in India Reserve of Officers, lately Aide-de-Camp to His Excellency the Governor of Burma
- Captain Ralph Burton, lately Aide-de-Camp to His Excellency the Viceroy
- Babu Alakh Kumar Sinha, Superintendent of Police, Bihar and Orissa
- Cecil William Kirkpatrick MBE Assistant Secretary to the Government of India, Foreign and Political Department
- Jessie Parsons, Principal of the Badshah Nawab Razvi Training College for Women Teachers, Patna
- The Reverend Robert McCheyne Paterson, Church of Scotland Mission, Gujrat, Punjab
- Lucy Angela White, lately Lady Superintendent, Queen Alexandra's Military Nursing Service for India

Diplomatic Service and Overseas List

- Minas Stephen Peter Aganoor, His Majesty's Vice-Consul at Ispahan
- Alexander Mann Alcock, Deputy Director-General of the Tanzim Department, Ministry of Public Works, Egyptian Government
- Colonel Julius Guthlac Birch, Rhineland High Commission
- John Wallace Ord Davidson, Acting British Consul at Kiu Kiang
- William Gray MBE His Majesty's Consul at Oruro
- The Reverend John Holman Taylor Holman Acting Chaplain at His Majesty's Legation at Peking
- Harmood Victor Carruthers Johnstone, Resident Engineer, Gezira Canalisation
- Reginald Marquand, Controller of European Administration of the Ministry of Education, Egyptian Government

Dominions

- Edith Mary Cumings, for many years-Honorary Secretary of the Bulawayo Branch Of the Guild of Loyal Women; for her services in Southern Rhodesia
- Mary Hewison, of St. Kilda, City of Melbourne; in recognition of her public and charitable services in the State of Victoria
- Rebecca Mills, of Maffra, Gippsland; in recognition of her charitable services in the State of Victoria

Colonies, Protectorates, etc.

- Robert Boyd, Chairman, Native Lands Commission, Fiji
- Herbert Spanton Brain, Auditor, Palestine
- The Reverend Canon George Burns, of the Church Missionary Society, in recognition of his services for many years in Kenya Colony
- Hubert Michael Cones, Deputy Inspector-General of Police, Iraq
- The Reverend Alexander Cruickshank, of the United Free Church of Scotland; in recognition of his services to education in Nigeria
- The Reverend Canon Edward Seabrooke Daniell, Principal of the Bishop Tucker Memorial College, Uganda Protectorate
- Lionel Douglas Galton Fenzi, Honorary Secretary of the Royal East African Automobile Association, Kenya Colony
- Albert Arthur Magnall Isherwood, Deputy Director of Education, Tanganyika Territory
- Robert Frier Jardine, Administrative Inspector, Ministry of the Interior, Iraq
- Alan Logan Kirkbride, Second Assistant to the Chief British Representative, Trans-Jordan
- Stephen Hemsley Longrigg, Administrative Inspector, Ministry of the Interior, Iraq
- Digby Mackenzie Macphail CM Medical Officer, District, St. Lucia, Windward Islands
- William Maclachlan McDonald MRCS LRCP Medical Officer, District 2, Antigua, Leeward Islands
- John Dewar McKay, Senior Unofficial Member of the Legislative Council of the Gold Coast
- Norman Nairn, for services in connection with the organisation of the Trans-Desert Motor Route between Iraq and the Mediterranean
- Percy Wilbraliam Perryman MBE Deputy Chief Secretary, Uganda Protectorate
- Major Norman Arthur Ralph Songest, lately Quartermaster, British Section, Palestine Gendarmerie
- John Edwin Tessensohn, Member of the Legislative Council, Straits Settlements
- Donald Francis Watson, Treasurer, Seychelles
- Cecil Richard Webb MC General Manager, Government Railways, Sierra Leone
- Herbert Richmond Wells, of the London Missionary Society, in recognition of his services in the cause of Education in Hong Kong
- Frank Edred Whitehead MRCS LRCP Director of Medical and Sanitary Services, Nyasaland Protectorate

Honorary Officers

- Surma Khaneem d'Bailt Mar Shimun, in recognition of her services in connection with the operations in Iraq, September–November, 1924
- Moses Doukhan, Lands Officer, Department of Lands, Palestine
- Suleiman Bey Toukan, Mayor of Nablus, Palestine

==== Member of the Order of the British Empire (MBE) ====
===== Military Division =====
Royal Navy

- Lieutenant Herbert John Harvey (Retired)
- Lieutenant George Lewin
- Commissioned Engineer Arthur Brown
- Commissioned Engineer William Murray Calder
- Paymaster-Lieutenant Alfred Thomas May
- Captain John Charles James Hoby RM

Army

- Company Sergeant-Major Clarence FitzGeorge Andrews, Royal Corps of Signals, attached 51st Divisional Signals
- Captain William Daniel Arthur, Royal Army Medical Corps
- Captain Leslie Edwin Barnes, 4th Battalion, the Northamptonshire Regiment, Territorial Army
- Staff Sergeant-Major Arthur Wellesley Baxter, Royal Army Service Corps, attached Sudan Defence Force
- Lieutenant Thomas William Bell, 3rd/6th Dragoon Guards, Station Staff Officer, Rawalpindi
- Quartermaster and Captain George Thomas Bray, Royal Army Medical Corps
- Captain Noel Joseph Chamberlain, Army Educational Corps
- Company Sergeant-Major James Chambers, Tyne Electrical Engineers, Royal Engineers, Territorial Army
- Conductor Henry Joseph Cheetham, Indian Army Ordnance Corps
- Captain William Maurice Clapp, 1/19th Hyderabad Regiment, Indian Army, attached Indian Signal Corps
- Quartermaster and Captain Thomas Cook, Depot, the Buffs (East Kent Regiment)
- Staff Sergeant-Major William Douglas, Royal Army Service-Corps
- Superintending Clerk John Edington, Royal Engineers
- Assistant Commissary and Lieutenant Andrew Forde, Indian Miscellaneous List
- Captain Eric Herbert Cokayne Frith, The Somerset Light Infantry (Prince Albert's), Adjutant, 5th Battalion
- Regimental Sergeant-Major Richard George Fry, Depot The Highland Light Infantry
- Captain Albert Fulcher, Ordnance Executive Officer, Royal Army-Ordnance Corps
- Temp. Lieutenant Herbert George Gates, Royal Engineers (Supplementary)
- Captain Francis Marion Saunders Gibson, The Devonshire Regiment, Instructor Machine Gun School, India
- Lieutenant Jack Ross Gifford MC Royal Artillery, Staff Captain (Movements) Inter-Allied Railway Commission, The British Army of the Rhine
- Staff Sergeant-Major Frederick Gill, Indian-Corps of Clerks
- Quartermaster and Captain John Grieve, Royal Army Service Corps
- Captain Frank Gowland Harvey TD Army Educational Corps, Instructor Army School, of Education, Belgium
- Regimental Sergeant Major Frank Hedges MC DCM 2nd Battalion Royal Tank Corps
- Quartermaster and Lieutenant George Henniker, Royal Engineers
- Lieutenant Richard Henry Hooper, The King's Shropshire Light Infantry, Adjutant and Quartermaster Army Signal School, Poona
- The-Reverend James Allen James Royal Army Chaplains' Department
- Quartermaster and Captain Frederick William Langley, The Sherwood Foresters (Nottinghamshire and Derbyshire Regiment)
- Captain George James Leathern MC The Bedfordshire and Hertfordshire Regiment, Adjutant, 2nd Battalion
- Lieutenant Walter Thomas Lunt, Army Educational Corps, Instructor Army School of Education, Belgaum
- Captain James Mahoney, Royal Tank Corps, Adjutant and Quartermaster, Royal Tank Corps School, Ahmednagar
- Sergeant-Major Albert Edward Malley, Royal Army Medical Corps
- Captain Richard Loudon McCreery MC 12th Royal Lancers (Prince of Wales's)
- Captain Archibald Edward McDonald, Ordnance Executive Officer 3rd Class, Royal Army Ordnance Corps
- Captain Walter Henry Organ, 43rd (Wessex) Divisional Engineers, Royal Engineers, Territorial Army
- Regimental Sergeant-Major Charles Thomas Pearson, Royal Military College, Sandhurst
- Lieutenant George Hamilton Charles Penny-cook, The Middlesex Regiment (The Duke of Cambridge's Own)
- Staff Sergeant-Major Frederick Walter Price, Royal Army Service Corps
- Captain Edward Cecil Roscoe AMIMechE Royal Army Service Corps
- Captain Eric Bertram Rowcroft AMIMechE Royal Army Service Corps, Instructor Royal Army Service Corps Training College, Aldershot
- Quartermaster Sergeant Frederick Albert Smith, 167th (City of London) Field Ambulance, Territorial Army
- Regimental Sergeant-Major Arthur Patrick Spackman, Royal Army Medical Corps, attached Sudan Defence Force
- Lieutenant William George Tibbies MC 5th Battalion, The Gloucestershire Regiment, Territorial Army
- Conductor Frederick William Tolley, Indian Miscellaneous List
- Quartermaster and Captain George John William Townsend, 17th London Regiment (Poplar and Stepney Rifles), Territorial Army
- Captain Bernard Henry George Tucker, 1/10th Gurkha Rifles, Indian Army
- Regimental Quartermaster-Sergeant Alexander Turner, The King's Own Yorkshire Light Infantry
- Regimental Sergeant-Major Alexander Twohey, Depot, The East Surrey Regiment
- Captain Vereker Willoughby Hamilton Venour, The King's Regiment (Liverpool), Staff Captain (Movements) Inter-Allied Railway Commission, The British Army of the Rhine
- Regimental Sergeant-Major Edward George Walker, Iraq Levies
- Quartermaster and Captain George Henry Wall MC 3rd Battalion, Grenadier Guards
- Quartermaster and Captain Alexander Watt, Lieutenant, Regular Army Reserve of Officers, and 7th Battalion, The Argyll and Sutherland Highlanders (Princess Louise's) Territorial Army
- Conductor Tom Harris Webb, Indian Army Service Corps
- Quartermaster and Captain Samuel Whan, County Recruiting Officer, Durham

Royal Air Force

- Flying Officer John Henry Amers
- Flying Officer Charles Dollery
- Flying Officer Robert Ritchie Greenlaw
- Flying Officer William Henry Jinman

===== Civil Division =====
- James Anderson, Accountant, General Post Office, Edinburgh
- James William Anderson, Superintendent, Metropolitan Police
- Joseph William Ansell, Ex-Superintendent, London Fire Brigade
- Elizabeth Apps, Member of the Baling, Acton and District War Pensions Committee
- Ernest Bacchus, Superintendent, B Division, Metropolitan Police
- Harold Eustace Baker, Commandant, Special Constabulary
- John Joseph Septimus Barker, Clerk to-the Lanchester Board of Guardians
- John Patrick Barrett, Clerk, Office of Assistant Director of Military Transport, Royal Arsenal, Woolwich
- William Henry Boucher, Acting First-Class Clerk, Ministry of Health
- William Stanley Brown, Assessor and Collector of Income Tax
- Joseph Browne, a founder of the United Kingdom Pilots Association
- James Kennedy Bryson, Surveyor, Board of Customs and Excise
- William Henry Bushill, Assistant Accountant, War Office
- Hugh James Campbell, Higher Executive Officer, Ministry of Home Affairs, Northern Ireland
- Olive Campbell, of Inverneill JP Member of the Argyll, Renfrew and Bute War Pensions Committee
- Annie Bindon Geoffrey Carter, Founder of Painted Fabrics Disabled Soldiers and Sailors Mutual Association
- Ethel Catherine Mary Gates, Higher Clerical Officer, Ministry of Health
- Albert Henry Coates, Clerk of Accounts, H.M. Land Registry
- Arthur Richard Cotton, Clerk to the Epsom Rural District Council
- Bertie Gibson Crewe, Principal Staff Officer, Industrial Property Department, Board of Trade
- Elizabeth Winifred Cronin, Deputy Governor, Hollow ay Prison
- Thomas James Dale, Accountant
- Finance Department, Ministry of Labour
- Gwendolen Florence Davies, Member of the Prime Minister's Clerical Staff
- William Michael Reuben Davis, Superintendent, Odiham Division, Aldershot, Hampshire County Police
- Alfred Ernest Dean, Honorary Secretary, Swindon Savings Committee
- James Elphinstone For voluntary services to the Scottish Savings Committee
- Alfred Vincent Elsden FIC Deputy War Department Chemist
- Thomas William Faulkner, Superintendent, Metropolitan Police
- John Laird Fitzhenry, Higher Executive Officer, Ministry of Finance, Northern Ireland
- Arthur Folkarde For voluntary services to the Scottish Savings Committee
- Joseph Gould, Surveyor, Board of, Customs and Excise
- Arthur Powell Guest FRHS Honorary Secretary, Taunton Savings Committee
- John Milbanke Hamilton, Manager, Tavistock Street (Building Trades) Employment Exchange
- Louisa Mildred Bateson Peter Hammond, Honorary Secretary, Leyburn Savings Committee, Yorkshire
- Hobert William Hatswell, Senior Staff Officer, Secretary's Office, General Post Office
- James Patrick Hausey, Waterguard Superintendent, Board of Customs and Excise
- Alfred Hayden, Commander, P Division, Special Constabulary
- Horace William Woodress Henderson, Civil Engineer, Acting Superintending Civil Engineer, Iraq Air Ministry
- John Holcroft, Surveyor, Board of Customs and Excise
- Ernest Harry Holmwood, Honorary Secretary, Maidstone Savings Committee
- John Frederick Houghton, Honorary Secretary, Gateshead Savings Committee
- Henry Humphrey, Honorary Secretary, Bolton Savings Committee
- Major Reginald Edmund Hutchins, Area Superintendent, France, and Registration Officer, France, under the Imperial War Graves Commission
- James Rae Anderson Irving, Superintendent, Gosforth Division, Northumberland Police
- Captain James Andrew Johnston, District Commandant, Ulster Special Constabulary
- John David Jones DL Member of the North West Wales War Pensions Committee
- David Kerr, Higher Executive Officer, Ministry of Commerce, Northern Ireland
- Frances King, Honorary Secretary, Dawlish Savings Committee
- James Arthur Trotman Langton, Higher Clerical Officer, Ministry of Health
- Arthur Arnold Lewis, Superintendent, Manchester City Police
- Arthur Claud Linecar, Headmaster, LCC Acland Central School
- James Mark, Deputy City Commandant, Ulster Special Constabulary
- Beatrice Mellors, Staff Clerk, Employment and Insurance Department, Ministry of Labour
- John Menzies, Collector of Taxes, Glasgow
- Thomas Mitchell JP Chairman, Stoke-on-Trent Savings Committee
- Maude Victoria Moore, Higher Executive Officer, Foreign Office
- Walter Henry Norman, Higher Executive Officer, Ministry of Pensions
- Daniel Joseph O'Callaghan, Accountant; Department of Overseas Trade
- Edgar Nix Pentelow, Surveyor, Board of Customs and Excise
- Doris Winifred Perken, Member of the Camberwell and District War Pensions Committee
- Leonard Perkins, Headmaster of Newton Road Council School, Rushden
- Sydney Richard Pughe, Staff Officer, Colonial Office
- Leslie Newby Punter JP Tax Officer, Higher Grade, Board of Inland Revenue
- Edward Albert Rix, Registrar, Commissioner's Office, Metropolitan Police
- Lewis Findlay Robertson, CA For voluntary services to the Scottish Savings Committee
- Edward William Roe, Commandant, T Division, Special Constabulary
- Hugh Alexander Ross, Commander E Division, Special Constabulary
- Gertrude Sanson, Headmistress, The Moberley Infants School, Harrow Road
- Amy Sayle, Chairman of Women Sanitary Inspectors' and Health Visitors' Association
- Alfred Younger Smellie, Staff Clerk and Accounts Officer, Air Ministry
- Margaret Stafford Smith Honorary Secretary, Bromley Savings Committee
- Charles Alonzo Stone, Superintendent
- Chesterfield Division, Derbyshire Police
- Stanley Cecil Strong, Supervising Clerk, War Office
- Alfred Egerton Maynard Taylor, Commander, "A" Division, Special Constabulary
- Frederick Tyler, Assistant Commander, Special Constabulary (H.Q. Staff)
- John Holland Walker, Honorary Secretary, Nottingham Savings Committee
- Walter John Walker FSA Chief Auditor, Bankruptcy Department, Board of Trade
- Joseph Adams White, Headmaster, LCC School, Bow
- Captain David Evan Williams Education Officer, Air Ministry
- William Winter, Deputy Chief Constable and Superintendent (Newmarket Division), Cambridgeshire Police

British India

- Alexander George Butt, Supervisor, Officer of the Director, Medical Services in India
- Shamrao Venkatrao Haldipur, Office of the Judge Advocate-General in India
- Arthur George Hall, Assistant Executive Engineer, Khyber Railway
- Major Joseph Henry Arnold Donnelland, Indian Medical Department, House Surgeon, Jamsetjee Jeejeebhoy Hospital, Bombay
- Major Henry Clement Craggs, Indian Medical Department, Military Assistant Surgeon, Madras
- Lieutenant Nawab Jamshed Ali Khan, Member of Legislative Council, United Provinces
- Khan Bahadur Ghias-ul-din Saiyid Abdul Karim Sahib Bahadur, Acting Deputy Superintendent of Police, Madras
- Thomas Bertram, Superintendent, Viceregal Estates
- Captain Albert Ignatius Patrick Browne, Postmaster, Peshawar
- Patrick Ambrose McCormack, District Engineer and Secretary, Quetta Municipality
- Alexander William Halkett, Indo-European Telegraph Department Office, Duzdap, East Persia
- George Herbert Cave, late Curator, Lloyd Botanic Garden, Darjeeling
- John Creffield, Inspector in charge of Government House, Calcutta
- Alakli Beliari Arora, Medical Officer of Health, Lahore
- Rao Bahadur Kesho Waman Brahma, Pleader, Amravati, Berar
- George Winstanley Price, Deputy Superintendent of Police, Punjab
- William Golaknath, Secretary Municipal Committee and District Board, Jullundur, Punjab
- Gerald Potenger, Superintendent, Office of the Military Adviser-in-Chief, Indian State Forces, Punjab
- Agnes Smith, Sambha Nath Pandit Hospital, Calcutta

Diplomatic Service and Overseas List

- Leonard Bennett Bayley, Divisional Traffic Superintendent, Sudan Government Railways
- John Preston Beecher, His Majesty's Vice-Consul at Havre
- Mulla Muhammad Aln Sharaf AH Harravala, His Majesty's Legation, Addis Ababa
- Robert Knight Hartley, Rhineland High Commission
- Philip Ingleson MC Assistant District Commissioner, Sudan Government
- Robert Carl Thorburn Jobson, His Majesty's Ex Vice-Consul at Warberg
- Georgina Loinaz, British Library of Information, New York
- William Studart, His Majesty's Vice-Consul at Ceara
- Edmund David Watt, His Majesty's Vice-Consul at Port-au-Prince
- William Calderwood Young MC Inspector of Agriculture, Sudan Government

Colonies, Protectorates, etc.

- Alfreda Louisa Allen, Principal of the Gayaza School for Girls, Uganda Protectorate
- Katherine Ross Cameron, Matron of the Zomba Hospital, Nyasaland Protectorate
- The Reverend James Denton DCL Principal of the Pourah Bay College, Freetown, Sierra Leone
- Major Joseph Turner Dew VD formerly Officer Commanding the Defence Force, Antigua, Leeward Islands
- Charles Peter Dias, Headmaster of Wesley College and Member of the Municipal Council of Colombo, Ceylon
- Henry David Grant MC lately Head-Constable-Major, Palestine Gendarmerie
- The Reverend William Edward Horley, Headmaster of the Anglo-Chinese School, Ipoh, Perak, Federated Malay States
- The Reverend Mother Superior Joseph, of the Catholic Mission of the Congregation of St. Joseph of Cluny; in recognition of her long services in the Gambia.
- Alexander Menzies Macfarlane MRCVS Government Veterinary Surgeon, Malta
- Kenneth Mackenzie, late Superintendent of Stores and Government Bookshop, Ministry of Education, Iraq
- Donald Kirton Macwilliam, Revenue Officer and Harbour Master, St. Kitts, Leeward Islands
- Jane McCotter, Senior Nursing Sister, Nigeria
- Elizabeth McKey, Senior Nursing Sister, Civil Nursing Service, Iraq
- The Reverend Father John Meehan, of the Catholic Mission of the Holy Ghost Fathers; in recognition of his services in the Gambia
- The Reverend Father Joseph Georges Edouard Michaud, Principal of the Kisube Boys School, Uganda Protectorate
- Ahmode Hajee Ahlanian Suhawon, in recognition of his services to Education in the Savanne District, Mauritius
- Foonyee Catherine Woo, Headmistress of St. Paul's Girls School, Hong Kong

Honorary Members

- Abdin Effendi Husheimi, Assistant Superintendent Of Police, Palestine
- Abdullah Effendi Kardus, Administrative Officer, Palestine
- Ahmed Seif Ed Bin Effendi Husseini, Mayor of Lydda, Palestine
- Asher Ben-David, Instructional Officer, Police Training School, Palestine
- Halim Abu Rahmeh, Medical Officer, Department of Health, Palestine
- Rank Bey Beydun, Administrative Officer, Palestine
- Sheikh Suleiman bin Nasur el-Lemki, Unofficial Member of the Legislative Council, Zanzibar, in recognition of his public and charitable services.

=== Members of the Order of the Companions of Honour (CH) ===
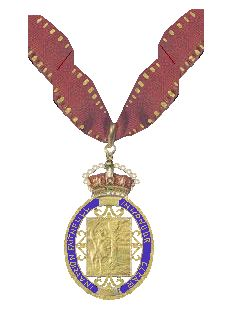
The riband and badge of the Companions of Honour

- The Reverend Herbert Armitage James President of St. John's College, Oxford

=== Kaisar-i-Hind Medal ===
First Class

- Mary Langharne Symons, Madras
- Florence Amy Hodgson, Chief Lady-Superintendent, Lady Minto's Indian Nursing Association
- Agnes Scott Chief Medical Officer, Women's Medical Service, and Secretary, Countess of Dufferin's Fund
- John David O'Donnell MBE VD FRCSE LRCP Chief Medical and Sanitary Officer, Kolar Gold Fields, Mysore
- The Reverend Charles Walker Posnett, Chairman and General Superintendent of the Wesleyan Mission in His Exalted Highness the Nizams Dominions, Medak, Hyderabad (Deccan)
- Major Joseph Alexander Hercules Holmes, Indian Medical Department, Senior Assistant Surgeon, British Station Hospital, Quetta
- Rose Greenfield, Murree, Punjab
- The Reverend Edward Sherman Oakley, London Mission, Almora, United Provinces
- The Reverend James Alexander Drysdale, Minister, Scots Church, Rangoon

=== British Empire Medal (BEM) ===
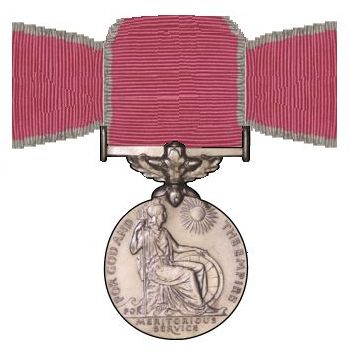
The British Empire Medal for meritorious service

For Gallantry

- Staff Sergeant Reginald Harry Maltby, 11th Armoured Car Company, Lahore, in recognition of the heroism he displayed in saving a child from drowning in a disused well.

For Meritorious Service

- Corporal William Watson Denton MM British Section of the Palestine Gendarmie. For consistently good work during his service.
- William James Ferguson, Constable, Royal Ulster Constabulary. For long and meritorious service of an exceptionally high standard.
- Staff Sergeant Harold Player, British Section of the Palestine Gendarmie. For loyal and devoted service as Orderly Room Staff Sergeant and Chief Clerk.

=== Air Force Cross (AFC) ===
- Flight Lieutenant John Stanley Chick MC
- Flight Lieutenant Archibald James Rankin

=== Air Force Medal (AFM) ===
- Sergeant Frederick Gilders Hammond
- Leading Aircraftman Ernest Arthur Dobbs

=== Imperial Service Order (ISO) ===
Home Civil Service

- Owen Vincent Blake OBE Chief Accountant, Foreign Office
- Ernest George Haygarth Brown, Superintending Inspector, Ministry of Agriculture and Fisheries
- James Latham Brown, Assistant Inspector of Elementary Schools, Board of Education
- Frank Richardson Chappell Chief Examining Surveyor, H.M. Office of Works
- Charles Alexander Comber, Chief Inspector, Postal Traffic, General Post Office
- John Cuthbert, Chief Clerk, Accountant-General's Department, Supreme Court of Judicature, Northern Ireland
- Matthew John Drayson, Staff Officer, Assistant Accountant, Colonial Office
- Frank Finch, Assistant Registrar-General, General Register Office
- Charles Henry James Garland, Divisional Inspector, Outdoor Staff, Ministry of Health
- Colvin Blacklock Gibson, Chief Assistant Keeper, Sasines Office, Edinburgh
- Horace John Macartney, Principal Staff Officer, Scottish Education Department
- Charles Richard Malcolm, Assistant Inspector of Explosives, Home Office
- Arthur Darling Nicholson, Divisional Inspector of Mines, Mines Department
- Henry Charles Souter, Head of Returns and Statistics Branch, Friendly Societies Registry
- Arthur Robinson Wright, Assistant Comptroller, Patent Office

Dominions

- Herbert William Ely, Secretary to the Agent-General in London for the State of Tasmania
- Robert Edward Hayes, Secretary to the Treasury, Dominion of New Zealand
- Francis Joseph Ross, President of the Superannuation Fund Management Board, Commonwealth of Australia
- Charles Henry Wickens, Statistician, Commonwealth of Australia

Colonial Civil Service

- Benjamin Belleth, Office Assistant to the Colonial Secretary, Ceylon
- Edward D'Urban Blyth, Assistant Commissioner, Basutoland
- Edgar Bonavia CMG Permanent Secretary to the Head of the Ministry, Malta
- Donald d'Emmerez de Charmoy, Assistant Director and Entomologist, Agricultural Department, Mauritius
- Henry James Hobbs, Provincial Commissioner, Gold Coast
- Henry Peter Marius McLaughlan MBE Chief Clerk in the Colonial Secretary's Office and Clerk to the Executive Council, Cyprus
- Dato Khatib Haji Mohamed Said, the Dato Sri Diraja, of Kelantan, Judge of the Land Court at Kota Bharu, Malay States

Indian Civil Service

- James Rideout Belletty, Registrar, Political and Appointment Departments, Government of Bengal
- Major Herbert William Valentine Cox, Indian Medical Department, Civil Surgeon, Punjab
- Ernest Henry James Eames, Distillery Expert to Government, Central Provinces
- Martin Thomas Echlin, Personal Assistant to the Chief Commissioner, Andaman and Nicobar Islands
- Thomas Edward McCullagh, Telegraph Check Office, Calcutta
- Khan Bahadur Kavasji Jamshedji Petigara, Superintendent of Police, Bombay

=== Imperial Service Medal (ISM) ===
- Venkatachellum Ramasawamy Mudaliyar, Tent Foreman, Central Jail, Coimbatore, Madras
