= John Arthur Stewart Jennings =

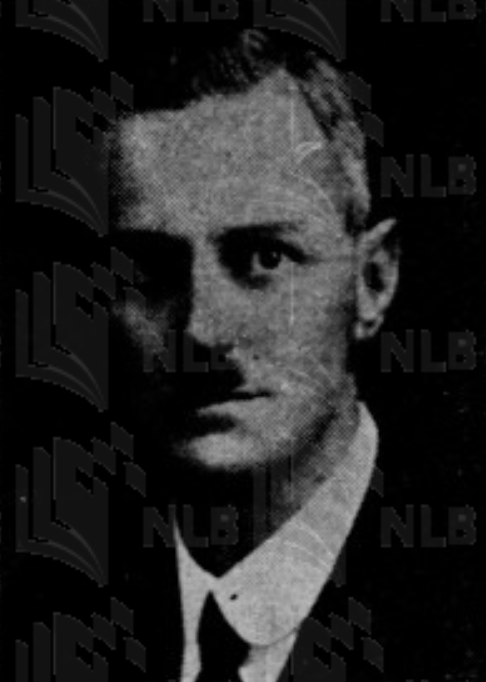
Jennings in 1936

John Arthur Stewart Jennings (pen names Southern Cross and The Egoist; 1 December 1889 – 4 December 1936) was the editor of the Times of Malaya, the first newspaper in Ipoh, and the sole proprietor of Times of Malaya Press, Ltd.

== Career ==
Jennings became a journalist at the age of 19. Early into his career, he wrote several short stories which were published as books, including Tales of Malaya, Tales Told by a Doctor and Tales Told by a Police Officer, under the pen name "Southern Cross". He also wrote under the pen name "The Egoist". He was also a volunteer with the F.M.S. Volunteer Forces and was present at the August 1902 Coronation of Edward VII and Alexandra with his contingent, during which he received the King Edward VII Coronation Medal. He was also the youngest non-commissioned officer at the Alexandra Park Colonial Camp.

In 1906, Jennings became the editor of the Times of Malaya, the first newspaper published in Ipoh, a role he held until several weeks before his death when the newspaper came under new ownership. He also served as the sole proprietor of Times of Malaya Press, Ltd., the firm which owned the newspaper. In his 1934 book Records And Recollections 1889-1934, John Henry Matthews Robson, the proprietor of the Malay Mail, wrote: "Although ably assisted at different times, Jack Jennings has practically made the "T.O.M." a one-man show. For twenty-eight years he has borne the burden on his shoulders. During this long period he has closely identified himself with the thousand and one interests of Perak. Every credit is due to him for the success he has made of his paper." Apart from the Times of Malaya, Jennings also founded the Malayan Tin and Rubber Journal, a magazine published fortnightly through the Times of Malaya Press which covered the rubber and tin mining industries of Malaya. He was a prominent advocate for making Ipoh the state capital of Perak instead of Taiping, the return of Dindings to Perak and the construction of a deepwater harbour at Lumut. In Kinta Valley: Pioneering Malaysia's Modern Development, written by historians Salma Nasution Khoo and Abdur-Razzaq Lubis, Jennings is described as having been a "leading champion of Ipoh, particularly in its bid to become the state capital of Perak."

In 1913, Jennings was appointed a Visiting Justice to Kinta Prisons. Following World War I, he became involved with the reorganising of the F.M.S. Volunteer Forces. Following the October 1918 floods in Ipoh, he established the Perak Flood Relief Fund, which raised nearly $120,000 before merging with the F.M.S. Relief Fund. He was also a member of the Cameron Highlands Sanitary Board and was involved in the founding of the Kelantan Malay Arts & Crafts Society. In 1935, he was conferred the OBE. During the Great Depression, the finances of the Times of Malaya suffered greatly. Jennings, whose health had by then declined, invested in a new building instead of machinery, a decision which historian Constance Mary Turnbull criticised as being unwise. He sold the paper in November 1936, shortly before his death in the next month.

== Personal life and death ==
Jennings was married and had four sons. After marrying, he and his wife, Freda, built a cottage named "Rosedale" on Kledang Hill which functioned as a weekend getaway. In his later years, Jennings built a house in the Cameron Highlands overlooking a golf course. He later sold the house. In early 1936, his health began to deteriorate, and his sons began running the Times of Malaya in his place. After suffering from a stroke on 2 December, he died at the Batu Gajah Hospital on 4 December, a month after the newspaper had been sold off.
