= Henry Cecil Prescott =

British Army officer (1882-1960)

Lieutenant-Colonel Henry Cecil Prescott CMG CIE
- Born: 1 March 1882; Cheshire, England
- Died: 3 August 1960 (aged 78); Saint Peter, Jersey
- Military career
- Allegiance: United Kingdom
- Branch: British Army; British India
- Service years: 1900–28
- Rank: Lieutenant-Colonel
- Units: Royal Welsh Fusiliers; The South Wales Borderers
- Conflicts: Second Boer War; World War I
- Awards: CMG CIE MID
- Other work: Inspector-General of Iraq Police; Chief of Police, Southern Railways, India

Lieutenant-Colonel Henry Cecil Prescott CMG CIE (1 March 1882 – 3 August 1960) was Inspector-General of Police in Iraq (1920–1935) and Chief of Police of the Southern Railway in India (1935–47).

== Early life ==
Henry Cecil Prescott was born in Cheshire on 1 March 1882, the son of Arthur Edward Prescott (who had died at the time of the 1891 census) and Kathleen Ann Augusta Prescott. He was educated at Bedford Modern School.

== Career ==
Prescott was commissioned in the 3rd (Militia) Battalion of the Royal Welsh Fusiliers, and served as a lieutenant in the Second Boer War (1901–02), for which he received the Queen's Medal with five clasps. While in South Africa, he received a commission in a regular regiment when he was appointed second lieutenant in The South Wales Borderers on 30 April 1902. He stayed there for several months after the end of hostilities, returning home again on the SS Norman in late December 1902. In 1903 he transferred to the Indian Army in the 69th Punjabis until his appointment as Assistant Superintendent in the Burma Police in January 1908. In December 1910 he was made District Superintendent of three districts in Burma.

At the outbreak of World War I, Prescott rejoined the Indian Army; he was promoted Major in August 1916. In June 1917 he was appointed Deputy Commissioner of the Iraq Police firstly in Basra and then in Baghdad. In 1918 he was made Commissioner. In 1920, Prescott was made Inspector-General of the Iraq Police until his resignation in 1935. In a statement of service, he later wrote, ‘If it had not been for the seizing of power by the opposition (many of the leaders of whom I had arrested and placed in prison for the safety of the country) I should have remained in command for some years longer’.

Prescott was later made Chief of Police of the Southern Railway in India for 12 years until his retirement in 1947.

== Awards and honours ==
During World War I he was mentioned in despatches and made a Companion of the Order of the Indian Empire (CIE) in 1919. In the 1926 Birthday Honours he was made a Companion of the Order of St Michael and St George (CMG), and towards the end of his service in Iraq he received the Order of the Two Rivers 2nd Class. A collection of his medals were sold at auction on 2 March 2005.

== Family life ==
A keen polo player, Prescott was in the championship team of Iraq for 1933, 1934 and 1935. He married Mary Augusta, daughter of Edward Chisholm. They had two sons, one of whom was killed on active service in 1939. Prescott eventually retired to St. Peter's, Jersey where he died on 3 August 1960.
