= Bertram Rowcroft =

British Army general

Major-General Sir Bertram Rowcroft KBE CB
- Rowcroft in 1942
- Born: 28 January 1891; London, England
- Died: 27 December 1963 (aged 72); Lyme Regis, Dorset, England
- Military career
- Allegiance: United Kingdom
- Branch: British Army
- Service years: 1908–1946
- Rank: Major-General
- Service number: 4585
- Commands: Director of Electrical and Mechanical Engineering; RASC Training Battalion
- Conflicts: First World War; Arab revolt in Palestine; Second World War
- Awards: Knight Commander of the Order of the British Empire; Companion of the Order of the Bath; Mentioned in dispatches (2)

Major General Sir Eric Bertram Rowcroft, KBE, CB (28 January 1891 – 27 December 1963) was a British Army officer. His military career started in 1908 as a Territorial Army officer in the Royal Engineers and retired at the rank of major general in 1946. He is noted for his involvement in the formation of The Corps of Royal Electrical and Mechanical Engineers (REME) and the planning of Operation Overlord.

== Family and education ==
Rowcroft was the son of Colonel George Francis Rowcroft. He was educated at Haileybury and the Royal Military College, Sandhurst.

== Military career ==
After his initial involvement with the Territorial Army, Rowcroft received his commission in 1911 after he passed out of Sandhurst into the Army Service Corps. At the outbreak of the First World War he served with the British Expeditionary Force overseas with various mechanical transport units. By 1918, Rowcroft worked at the War Office in a technical capacity. He was appointed a Member of the Order of the British Empire (MBE) in the 1926 Birthday Honours while serving as an instructor at the Royal Army Service Corps Training College, Aldershot. During the interwar period he served in India, Ceylon and at the Tank Inspection Department, at Woolwich Arsenal. His army career continued along the Technical route when in 1936 he was appointed commander Royal Army Service Corps (RASC), 1st Division in Palestine during the 1936–1939 Arab revolt in Palestine.

=== Second World War ===
On the outbreak of the Second World War, Rowcroft was in command of the RASC Training Battalion in the United Kingdom. However, the repair and recovery element within the British Army was divided between the various service corps of the time, this was considered inefficient. In 1942 REME was formed to recover and maintain the army's equipment, both in the battlefield and in the rear area, with Rowcroft becoming its first director.

== Later life ==
For his efforts during the Second World War, Rowcroft was appointed a Companion of the Order of the Bath in 1944, and in 1946 on his retirement from the army he became a Knight Commander of the Order of the British Empire. His involvement in the REME continued until 1956, as he served in the capacity of Colonel Commandant. During his later years he got heavily involved in local affairs in his home town of Lyme Regis, where he died in 1963.

== Bibliography ==
- Smart, Nick (2005). Biographical Dictionary of British Generals of the Second World War. Barnesley: Pen & Sword. ISBN 1844150496.
