= Houston French =

British Army officer

Captain Sir Houston French CVO (27 March 1853 – 11 June 1932) was a British Army officer and an officer of the Yeomen of the Guard.

Born in Ardsallagh, near Navan, County Meath, French was commissioned into the 2nd Life Guards in 1873. He served in the 1882 Egyptian Campaign, was promoted Captain in 1887 and retired in 1895.

In 1895 he was appointed an Exon (the most junior officer rank) of the Yeomen of the Guard and was promoted to Clerk of the Cheque and Adjutant in 1908 and lieutenant (the effective commander of the body, since the captain is a political appointment) in 1925, holding the post until his death. He briefly returned to the Army in the Second Boer War in 1899–1900 as a staff officer with the 2nd Cavalry Brigade.

French was appointed Member of the Royal Victorian Order (MVO) in 1911 and Commander of the Royal Victorian Order (CVO) in the 1920 New Year Honours, and was knighted in the 1926 Birthday Honours.
