= Donald d'Emmerez de Charmoy =

Mauritian entomologist (1906–1979)

- Born: 28 June 1906; Plaines Wilhems, British Mauritius
- Died: 2 December 1979 (aged 73); Sainte-Clotilde, Réunion
- Occupation(s): Entomologist; President of CERF (1929–1974)
- Organization: CERF (Centre d'Essai de Recherche et de Formation)
- Known for: Genetic modification of sugarcane
- Spouse: Marie-Antoinette Chauvet (married 1931)
- Parent(s): Paul Donald d'Emmerez de Charmoy; Marie–Marguerite Louise Motet de Torvilliers

Donald d'Emmerez de Charmoy ISO (28 June 1906 – 2 December 1979) was a Mauritian entomologist and biologist.

== Biography ==
Donald d'Emmerez was born on 28 June 1906 in British Mauritius, and died on 2 December 1979. He is the son of an eminent Mauritian naturalist, Paul Donald d'Emmerez de Charmoy and his wife, née Marie-Louise Marguerite Motet de Torvilliers. He is the second child of the couple, who had given birth in 1899 to a daughter, Valerie Marie Antoinette d'Emmerez de Charmoy.

He married Marie Antoinette Chauvet (1906–1937) on 6 June 1931.

He began his career by making a two-year internship in British India to study the hybridization of sugar. He was awarded the Imperial Service Order in the 1926 Birthday Honours, when he was the assistant director and entomologist at the Agricultural Department of Mauritius. He led the Centre d'Essai de Recherche et de Formation (CERF) from 1929 to 1974. Between these two dates, the average yields per hectare increased from two tonnes of sugar to more than five tons. It is now eight tons of sugar per hectare on average and can still improve.

== Career ==
He was the founder and first director of the Testing Station (renamed Test Center for Research and Training in 1973 (TCRT), or CERF in French) until his retirement in 1974. His international reputation allowed the CERF to exchange with other hybridization's stations of the world their best varieties.

He began at the age of 45 a breeding program of the cane in Reunion Island. Thanks to this researcher, "sugar agronomy of Reunion is raised to a high degree of perfection," according to Jean Defos du Rau, in his thesis in geography (1960).

In the 30s, Donald d'Emmerez de Charmoy hybridized a series of varieties that have saved the local industry from slump health, and largely explain the observed sugar boom during the fifteen years following the end of war conflict, and the naval blockade which was its consequence, net exports had stopped sugar, and many fields were abandoned or uprooted). All these varieties are from the same, which their progenitor us the secret in his personal archives: 19/32e sap noble, 4/32e Indian and 9/32e wild sap.

Donald d'Emmerez de Charmoy experimented for the first time a fundamental principle of modern breeding, which is now well known breeders: interspecific hybridization.

At first, Emmerez imported of foreign varieties of hybrid nature newly obtained in order to restore the destroyed plantations, then began to work patiently on genetic improvement in Reunion Island in order to improve the hybrid cross method through the creation of material plant, because it was selected in the conditions of the island.
