= Robert Frier Jardine =

British colonial administrator, diplomat and Kurdish linguist (1894–1982)

Robert Frier Jardine, CMG OBE (1894–1982), was a British colonial administrator, diplomat, military officer and Kurdish linguist. He served in Mesopotamia, Iraq and Mandatory Palestine between 1917 and 1948, holding a number of senior administrative posts concerned with frontier affairs, land settlement and water administration. He is best known for his linguistic study Bahdinan Kurmanji (1922), one of the earliest modern grammars of the Bahdinani dialect of Kurdish.

== Early life and education ==
Jardine was born in 1894 and was educated at Downing College, Cambridge.

== Military service ==
Following the outbreak of the First World War, Jardine joined the British Army as a second lieutenant. He served at Gallipoli, in Egypt and in Mesopotamia.

== Career in Iraq ==
In 1917 Jardine became a Political Officer in northern Iraq, where he worked among Assyrian and Kurdish communities for approximately five years. During this period he acquired a knowledge of Kurdish and Arabic and developed an interest in Kurdish linguistics.

In 1924 he served on the British delegation dealing with frontier questions before the League of Nations and at Constantinople. The following year he was appointed assessor to the Turco-Iraqi Frontier Commission, which was involved in determining the boundary between Turkey and Iraq following the Mosul dispute.

In 1926 he took part in negotiations at Ankara concerning the tripartite treaty between Britain, Iraq and Turkey, serving as adviser to the British ambassador.

Jardine later served as Administrative Inspector at Mosul and subsequently at Basra. In 1933 he became President of the Land Settlement Commission in Iraq.

== Palestine ==
In 1936 Jardine was transferred to Mandatory Palestine, where he was appointed Chief Inspector of Land Registration and served on a number of official commissions.

In 1940 he became assistant director of Land Settlement and, from 1942, Water Commissioner. During the Second World War he served as an adviser to General Headquarters in Jerusalem and held the rank of lieutenant-colonel.

In 1945 he was appointed Director of Land Settlement and also served as Commissioner for Compensation for Rebellion and War Damages.

He retired from public service in 1948.

== Kurdish studies ==
Jardine is chiefly remembered for his contribution to the study of Kurdish. While serving in Kurdistan he produced one of the earliest detailed studies of the Bahdinani dialect of Kurmanji Kurdish.

In 1922 he published:

Jardine, R. F. Bahdinan Kurmanji: A Grammar of the Kurmanji of the Kurds of Mosul Division and Surrounding Districts of Kurdistan. Baghdad: Government Press, 1922.

The work contains a grammatical description together with a Kurdish vocabulary and remains a cited source in modern Kurdish linguistic scholarship.

The grammar has also attracted attention among Kurdish language activists and researchers.

The Encyclopaedia Iranica identifies Jardine as one of the early figures in the British tradition of Kurdish studies.

== Honours ==
Jardine was appointed an Officer of the Order of the British Empire (OBE) in the 1926 Birthday Honours for his services in Iraq.

He was appointed a Companion of the Order of St Michael and St George (CMG) in 1928.

== Personal life ==
Jardine spoke both Kurdish and Arabic.

He died in 1982.

== Publications ==
Jardine, Robert Frier (1922). Bahdinan Kurmanji: A Grammar of the Kurmanji of the Kurds of Mosul Division and Surrounding Districts of Kurdistan. Baghdad: Government Press.
