= John Ernest Harper =

British Royal Navy officer (1874–1949)

Vice-Admiral John Ernest Harper CB MVO
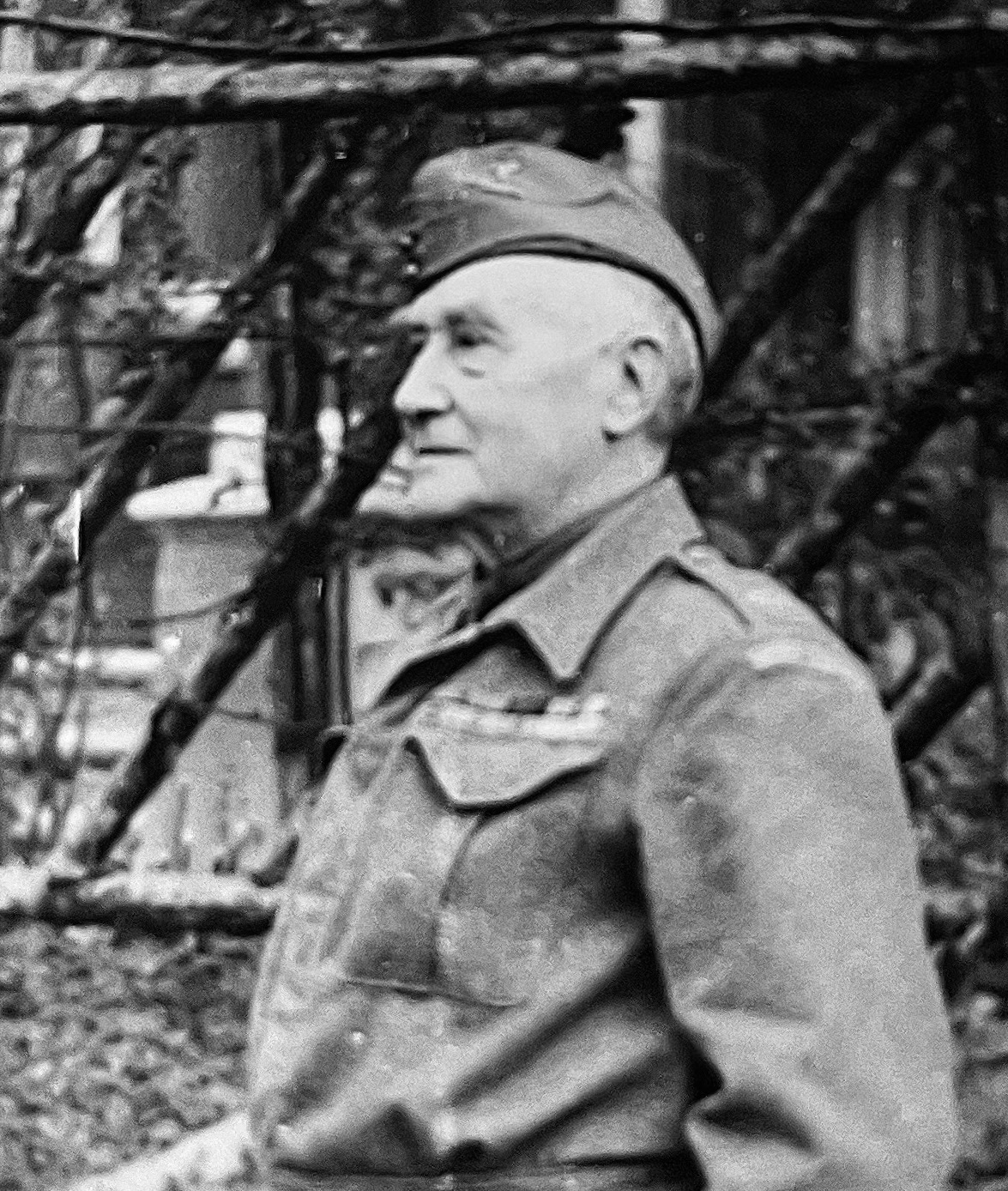
- J E T Harper as a Captain in the Home Guard in Kent in 1941
- Born: John Ernest Troyte Harper; 29 May 1874; New Zealand
- Died: 27 May 1949 (aged 74); Kent, England
- Occupation: Royal Navy officer
- Known for: Documenting the Battle of Jutland

Vice-Admiral John Ernest Troyte Harper CB MVO (29 May 1874 – 27 May 1949) was a British Royal Navy officer.

== Biography ==
Harper was born in New Zealand and educated there at Christ's College. In 1888 he joined the Royal Navy, being promoted to Lieutenant in 1896. He served in the South African war from 1899 to 1900 and the Ogaden Somali expedition from 1900 to 1901. In March 1902 he was appointed to serve at the Aboukir, deployed at the Mediterranean station. He was promoted to the rank of Commander in 1906, and was navigating commander of the Royal Yacht Victoria and Albert between 1911 and 1914.

He became captain in 1913 and at the Naval Review of July 1914 served as master of the fleet.

=== Battle of Jutland account ===
He came to the attention of the public in the aftermath of the Battle of Jutland; after World War I was over, the Admiralty decided to commission an official account of the battle, and Harper was chosen to do this. The Harper Record was commissioned by the First Sea Lord, Rosslyn Wemyss, and was completed during his term of office in 1919. Harper, who was Director of Navigation, was to 'prepare a record, with plans, showing in chronological order what actually occurred in the battle'. The account was to be based solely on the written records available at the Admiralty, without commentary on the merits of what had taken place. An official report had by now been long expected by the public; questions had been asked in Parliament about when it would be completed. The First Lord, Walter Long advised the House of Commons of the United Kingdom on 29 October 1919 that the record would be printed once it was ready. It was not finally published until 1927, the matter being raised in the House 22 times during that time.

Wemyss was replaced as First Sea Lord by David Beatty, who had commanded the detached Battle Cruiser Fleet at Jutland. Beatty shortly sought to make alterations to the record, initially by ordering that despatches made by himself, Scheer (the German commander) and John Jellicoe (commanding the main British Fleet) be added, together with a list of all signals made during the battle. He also requested removal of a passage discussing the part of the battle which most concerned the battle cruisers, and other alterations which Harper conceded to be minor. Beatty's reason was that the logs kept during battle had been inaccurate and consequently charts drawn up from them did not accord with the recollections of officers who had been present. In particular, Beatty objected to the record showing his own ship performing a complete circular turn, and insisted instead that it had manoeuvered through two 180 degree turns in an 's' shape. Beatty went so far as to produce a chart showing the turn as he described, signed by him and dated 1916. Inspection of the chart showed the signature to be similar to the form he customarily used in 1920, rather than the different form he used in 1916, while other testimony supported the claim that the ship had indeed turned a full circle.

Harper was unwilling to put his name to a document he could not agree with, unless ordered in writing to do so. The Admiralty intended to publish much of the original source material, which would be available to others to judge the accuracy of his work. Harper requested confirmation from Chatfield of the instructions to alter the record and received orders from Beatty to include them, 'in accordance with Board decision'. However, Harper records that First Lord Walter Long asked him what was causing delay in publication, and was then unaware that Beatty had ordered changes. Shortly afterward Beatty withdrew his objections and a final version was agreed for publication on 14 May 1920, though still containing alterations from the original.

Beatty continued objections, now addressing his requests for changes to Lord Long, and a preface was added as well as some more changes to the text. Jellicoe was invited to view the original version and the altered form, and produced his own objections to some of the alterations, going so far as to say he would not be able to take up his forthcoming appointment as Governor of New Zealand unless the matter could be settled satisfactorily. He objected that the preface gave the impression that the main battle fleet under his command had arrived late and had little effect upon the battle. Negotiations continued, with Harper gaining the impression that Beatty's intent was simply to delay publication indefinitely. A final decision not to publish was taken by Long on the grounds that an official account of the whole naval war was anyway to be published by Sir Julian Corbett. Corbett had been given a copy of the 'Harper record' to assist him in his task.

Harper was director of navigation at the admiralty from 1919 to 1921 and member of the Anglo-American Arbitration board from 1921 to 1922. The minutes of a Board of Admiralty meeting in March 1923, chaired by Beatty, noted that he should only be retained in the service if he received a favourable report from his commander in chief. He was naval aide de camp to King George V from 1923 to 1924, becoming Rear-Admiral in August 1924. In 1926 he was advised that he would probably be appointed commander of a dockyard, but the newly appointed Controller of the Navy, Chatfield, decided against the appointment. He was appointed a Companion of the Order of the Bath (CB) in the 1926 Birthday Honours. He was placed on the retired list in February 1927, though promoted to vice admiral in retirement in 1929. From 1934 to 1946 he was nautical assessor to the House of Lords.

After his retirement, Harper published another account of the battle, The Truth about Jutland, in his own name. In this he commented about the battlecruiser engagement commanded by Beatty "it is an indisputable fact that, in the first phase of this battle, a British squadron, greatly superior in numbers and gun-power, not only failed to defeat a weaker enemy who made no effort to avoid action, but, in the space of 50 minutes suffered what can only be described as a partial defeat."

Harper died 27 May 1949 and the funeral took place at All Saints' church, Hawkhurst, Kent.

His son, also John Harper, also became a commander in the Royal Navy.

== Filmography ==
=== Film ===
Year	Title	Role	Notes
1940	For Freedom	Himself	

== Publications ==
- "The Truth About Jutland" (1927)
- "The Riddle of Jutland" (1934) (with Langhorne Gibson)
- "The Royal Navy at War" (1941)
