= Henry Gompertz =

19th and 20th century Asian lawyer, jurist and judge

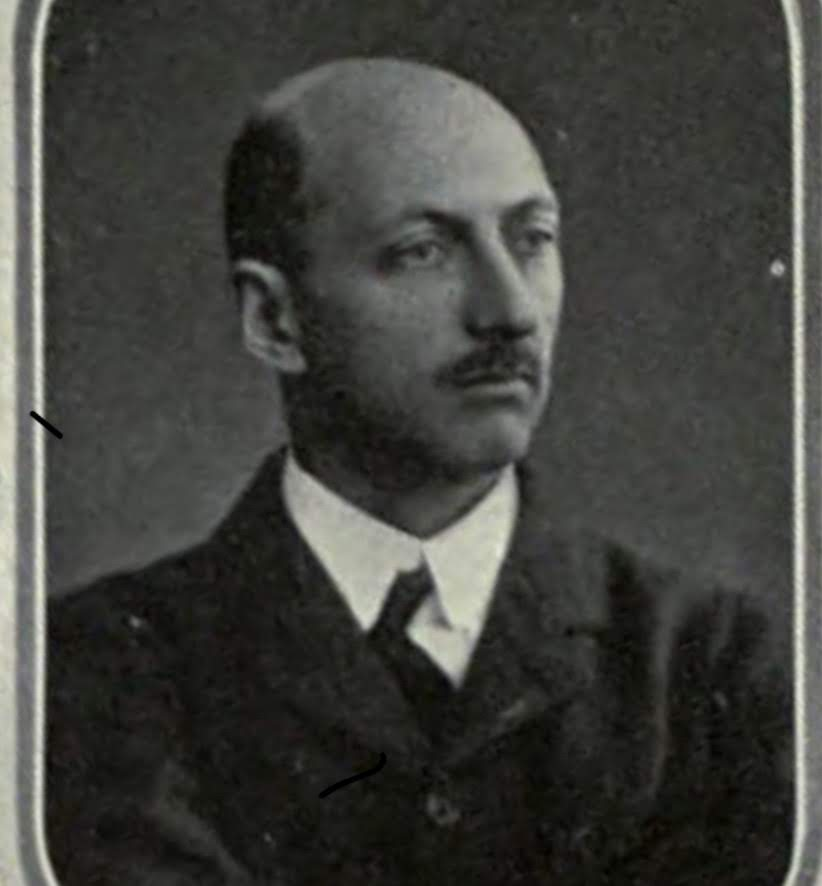

Sir Henry Hessey Johnston Gompertz (31 August 1867 – 4 February 1930) was a Puisne Judge in the Supreme Court, Hong Kong, and Chief Justice of the Federated Malay States.

== Biography ==
Born on 31 August 1867, Gompertz was educated at Bedford School and at Exeter College, Oxford. He was called to the Bar, as a member of Lincoln's Inn, in 1899. He was a Puisne Judge in the Supreme Court, Hong Kong, between 1909 and 1925, and Chief Justice of the Federated Malay States, between 1925 and 1929. He was knighted in the 1926 Birthday Honours.

Gompertz retired in 1929, and died in Alassio on 4 February 1930.
