= Arthur Barnby =

English cricketer and military officer

Colonel Arthur Barnby OBE
Personal information
- Full name: Arthur Charles Barnby
- Born: 10 September 1881; Westminster, Middlesex, England
- Died: 30 October 1937 (aged 56); Rochester Airport, Kent, England
- Batting: Right-handed
- Role: Wicket-keeper

Career statistics
| Competition | First-class |
|---|---|
| Matches | 1 |
| Runs scored | 1 |
| Batting average | 1.00 |
| 100s/50s | 0/0 |
| Top score | 1* |
| Catches/stumpings | 0/0 |
- Source: Cricinfo, 25 December 2019

Arthur Charles Barnby OBE (10 September 1881 – 30 October 1937) was an English first-class cricketer, who served as an officer in both the Royal Marines and the Royal Naval Air Service.

== Life and military career ==
Born at Westminster in September 1881, Barnby was commissioned into the Royal Marines as a second lieutenant. He was promoted to lieutenant in July 1901, with promotion to captain coming a decade later in September 1911. Barnby made a single appearance in first-class cricket for the Royal Navy Cricket Club against the British Army cricket team at Lord's in 1913. Batting twice in the match, he was dismissed without scoring in the Royal Navy first-innings by Harold Fawcus, while in their second-innings he scored a single unbeaten run.

He served in the First World War, and as an early aviator who had held an aviation licence since 1913, he was seconded to the newly formed Royal Naval Air Service (RNAS), where he held the rank of flight commander. He was promoted to squadron commander in May 1915, which resulted in him concurrently being made a temporary major in the marines. He was made a full major in June 1917, having completed sixteen years services. He was promoted to wing commander in the RNAS in December 1917, resulting in him being granted the temporary rank of lieutenant colonel in the marines.

Following the end of the war, Barnby relinquished his commission in the RNAS and returned to the marines as a major. He was made an OBE in the 1926 Birthday Honours. Barnby was appointed a barrackmaster and promoted to lieutenant colonel in August 1929, however he reverted to major at his own request in October 1930. He was again promoted to lieutenant colonel in April 1931, before being placed on the retired list on account of old age in September 1933, at which point he was granted the rank of colonel. Barnby died suddenly at Rochester Airport in October 1937.
