= Reginald Bond =

British medical doctor

- Bond in 1933
- Born: 10 April 1872
- Died: 27 July 1955 (aged 83)
- Other name: Sir Reginald St George Smallridge Bond
- Occupation: Medical doctor

Sir Reginald St George Smallridge Bond KCB FRCP FRCSE (10 April 1872 – 27 July 1955) was a British medical doctor and Royal Navy administrator. He was Medical Director-General of the Royal Navy, 1931–1934; and Honorary Physician to the King at the same time.

Bond was appointed a Companion of the Order of the Bath (CB) in the 1926 Birthday Honours.
