= The Selangor Journal =

19th century English-language newspaper in Selangor

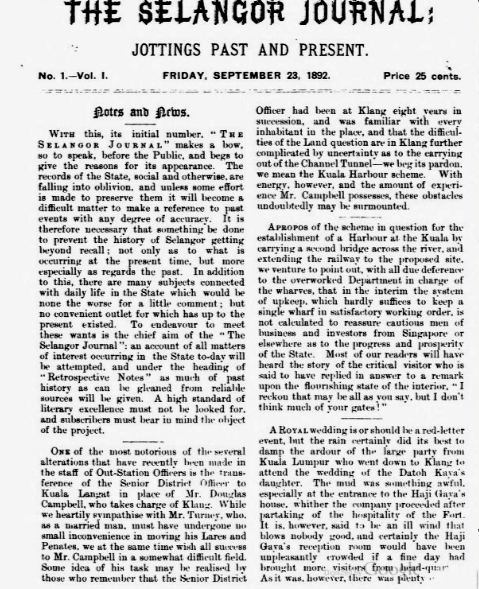
- The Selangor Journal, first edition 23 September 1892
- Type: Fortnightly newspaper
- Format: Octavo
- Founder: John H.M. Robson
- Editor: John Russell
- Founded: 1892
- Ceased publication: 1897
- Language: English
- City: Kuala Lumpur
- Price: 50 cents

The Selangor Journal was an English-language newspaper established in 1892 in Selangor by John H.M. Robson, a British government official. It was the first English-language newspaper published in the Malay States, and continued until 1897 when it was superseded by the Malay Mail.

== History ==
The Selangor Journal was the first newspaper to be published in English in the Malay States. It was founded in 1892 in Kuala Lumpur by John H.M. Robson who was a British government official working with the Selangor government, and edited by John Russell, Superintendent of the Government Printing Office.

Published fortnightly, the newspaper ran from 1892 to 1897, and cost 25 cents. Catering to the European community, it focused on local news and events and the history of Selangor. Useful information concerning the railways, shipping, posts and telegraphs was included, and letters from readers were published.

The last edition of The Selangor Journal was published in 1897 when Robson decided to leave his government job and work full-time on its successor, a new English-language newspaper which he established, the Malay Mail, which was published daily.
