= Henry Coward =

British conductor (1849–1944)

Sir Henry Coward

Sir Henry Coward (26 November 1849 – 10 June 1944) was a British conductor and composer.

Born in Liverpool to parents in the entertainment industry, Coward took an apprenticeship to a cutler in Sheffield. Educating himself, he became a teacher and soon a headteacher.

Coward's interest in music developed from a tonic sol-fa class, and in 1876 he founded the Sheffield Tonic Sol-fa Association. This was renamed the Sheffield Musical Union, and Coward was its director until 1933. His choral legacy is still visible in Sheffield, following Sheffield Music Union's 1937 merger with the Sheffield Philharmonic Chorus, a choir which still performs to this day.

In 1889, Coward obtained a B.Mus. degree at the University of Oxford, and in 1894, became a Doctor of Music. He returned to Sheffield, where he became the chorus master of the Sheffield Music Festival. He conducted societies in Leeds, Huddersfield, Newcastle and Glasgow, and toured worldwide with the Sheffield Choir. He also taught music at Sheffield Training College and lectured at the University of Sheffield.

In 1897, having established a reputation for conducting large numbers of singers in Sheffield parks, he was invited to oversee a gathering of 60,000 school-children in Norfolk Park in Sheffield, to entertain Queen Victoria.

Dan Godfrey wrote that "it is doubtful whether England has ever produced a better or more gifted choir trainer than Coward... He has evolved, formulated and put into practice a method of choral technique which has had the result of bringing about a revival of singing in chorus which has spread through the whole Empire."

After World War I, Henry Coward faced criticism for being unable to conduct an orchestra, but was knighted in the 1926 Birthday Honours and, from 1929 to 1944, served as President of the Tonic Sol-fa College in London.

A Blue plaque at 6 Kenwood Road, Nether Edge In Sheffield where he lived between 1931 and 1944.

Coward campaigned against jazz, describing it as "atavistic, lowering, degrading and a racial question ... composed of ... unquestionably grotesque forms."

Coward was an active Freemason being initiated in Furnival Lodge No.2558 Sheffield in 1896 and becoming a founding member of University Lodge No.3911 Sheffield in 1919.

Sir Henry Coward died in 1944, aged 94.

== Works ==
- Choral Technique and Interpretation (1914)
