= William Edward Dudley =

Sir William Edward Dudley
- Born: 29 May 1868; Runcorn, Cheshire, England
- Died: 7 May 1938 (aged 69); Runcorn, Cheshire, England
- Occupation: Administrator in the British co-operative movement
- Movement: Co-operative
- Spouse: Theresa Sutton (m. 1893; died 1927)

Sir William Edward Dudley (29 May 1868 – 7 May 1938) was an administrator in the British co-operative movement and a local politician. He lived in Runcorn, Cheshire, throughout his life and, after working with Bridgewater Navigation, he joined the co-operative movement in 1893. Dudley served in various positions in the movement, initially locally and later nationally, eventually becoming president of the Co-operative Wholesale Society. During and after the First World War he was an adviser to the government on matters concerning food, and was knighted for this service in 1936. He was also a local politician, and served on a number of local committees.

== Early life ==
Dudley was born in Runcorn, Cheshire, on 29 May 1868, and was the son of a house painter. He attended the local church school, and was first employed as an office boy by the Bridgewater Navigation. He then moved to the engineer's office, and eventually became in charge of it. Following his marriage in 1893, he joined the Runcorn Co-operative Society.

== Co-operative movement ==
Dudley was elected to the management committee of the Runcorn Co-operative Society in 1895, and became its chairman in 1895. He became a member of the board of the north-western section of the Co-operative Union in 1904, and was the chairman from 1911. In this year he was elected to the board of the Co-operative Wholesale Society when he resigned from the Bridgewater Navigation and the local co-operative movement. Dudley served on the grocery committee of the Co-operative Wholesale Society, and became its chairman from 1916.

During the First World War he worked with the government to influence food supplies, and in 1918 he was a member of the consumers' council at the Ministry of Food. During and following the war he served on a number of committees, and helped to revise the post-war import restrictions. He served on the royal commission on food prices in 1924, and on the National Food Council the following year. Dudley was elected as president of the 1925 Co-operative Congress.

In 1933, he was appointed as the president of the Co-operative Wholesale Society, and during his presidency the Co-operative Wholesale Society Retail Society was formed in 1934. For the work he carried out for the Ministry of Food, he was appointed OBE in 1920, and was knighted in the 1926 Birthday Honours. He retired as president of the Co-operative Wholesale Society in 1936 due to ill health.

== Other roles and later life ==
From 1914 Dudley served as an independent member of the Runcorn urban district council, being the chairman from 1921 to 1923. He was also an overseer of the poor and a JP, and was involved with local charities and societies.

From 1919 he represented the Co-operative Wholesale Society as a director of the Manchester Ship Canal, and from 1930 he chaired the committee controlling the Bridgewater Navigation. Dudley was also a director of the Bridgewater and Manchester collieries. He died at his Runcorn home on 7 May 1938, and was survived by a son and a daughter.
