= George Gall Sim =

British administrator in India and businessman (1878–1930)

George Gall Sim CSI CIE (17 January 1878 – 20 August 1930) was a British administrator in India and later a businessman.

Sim was born in Strichen, Aberdeenshire, Scotland, and was educated at the University of Aberdeen and Christ Church, Oxford. He joined the Indian Civil Service in 1900 and went out to India at the end of 1901, where he was posted to the United Provinces, serving as an Assistant Magistrate and Collector.

In 1908, he was appointed Under-Secretary to the Government of the United Provinces, holding the post until 1910, and was for a time Acting Secretary. He was chairman of the Municipal Board of Cawnpore from 1912 to 1917, where he improved sanitation and housing in the growing industrial city. In 1917 he was appointed Financial Secretary of the United Provinces and in January 1920 he transferred to the Finance Department of the Government of India to assist in the major changes being implemented at that time. When these changes took effect he became Joint Secretary of the Finance Department, but soon left it to join the new Board of Inland Revenue, where he consolidated and improved Indian income tax law and its administration.

In April 1923, Sim was appointed Financial Commissioner of the Indian Railway Department (which became the Indian Railway Board in October 1924), which was going through huge financial reorganisation.

In 1926, he resigned to enter business back in the United Kingdom, becoming secretary of Vickers Ltd in July 1926 and deputy chairman of Vickers-Armstrong Ltd in March 1929.

He was appointed Companion of the Order of the Indian Empire (CIE) in the 1920 New Year Honours and Companion of the Order of the Star of India (CSI) in the 1926 Birthday Honours.

Sim died at Elgin of pneumonia and malaria at the age of 52.
