= Sheffield Philharmonic Chorus =

Sheffield Philharmonic Chorus (also known as Sheffield Phil) is a large choir based in Sheffield, South Yorkshire, England. The chorus consists of about 190 members from Sheffield and the surrounding area and performs between five and ten concerts each season. A regular venue is Sheffield City Hall, although the choir also performs concerts in the Bridgewater Hall and Leeds Town Hall as well as other national and international venues. The musical director is Darius Battiwalla, who has held the post since 1997.

== History ==
The emergence of Sheffield Philharmonic Chorus stems from an amalgamation of two pre-existing Sheffield musical organisations in the 1930s, the Amateur Musical Society and Sheffield Musical Union.

=== Amateur Musical Society ===
The local Amateur Musical Society was founded in 1864 and run by H W Ibbotson (a local solicitor), having developed from a singing class he initiated in 1857. From 1935, the recently built Sheffield City Hall became the home of an annual series of concerts, which were to be organised by the Amateur Musical Society. The society changed its name to Sheffield Philharmonic Society and its choir, Sheffield Philharmonic Chorus, became the resident chorus.

=== Sheffield Musical Union ===
Founded in 1876 by Henry Coward, the Sheffield Musical Union started as a tonic sol-fa class but grew in stature, undertaking international tours in early 1908 and 1911. In 1937, the Sheffield Philharmonic Chorus merged with Sheffield Musical Union, increasing the membership of the choir to almost 400.

== Patron ==
On 6 February 2008, it was announced that the actor and director Samuel West would become patron of the chorus. He had already appeared with the chorus as the narrator for two performances of an arrangement of Walton's Henry V music in 2005.

== Notable musical collaborations and events ==
Sheffield Philharmonic Chorus regularly sings with BBC Philharmonic Orchestra, Northern Sinfonia, Manchester Camerata and the Hallé, and over the last few years has performed under the batons of Gianandrea Noseda, Nicholas Kraemer and Sir Mark Elder, as well as its own regular conductor, Darius Battiwalla, and others. In previous years, Sheffield Phil has also been conducted by Sir John Barbirolli and Vassily Sinaisky.

On 29 September 2007, the chorus took part in the 75th Gala Concert for Sheffield City Hall, singing with the soprano Lesley Garrett, joined by dancers Erin Boag and Anton du Beke.

Since around 2006, Sheffield Phil has developed touring and performance links with the Philharmonischer Chor Bochum, who are regular performers with the Bochumer Symphoniker and based in Bochum, one of Sheffield's twin towns in Germany.

=== Proms ===
The chorus has been invited to participate in The Proms on three occasions in recent years. In August 1998, the choir contributed to the total of thousand singers led by Nicholas Kenyon who sang Orff's Carmina Burana. On 10 September 2005, Sheffield Phil performed in the Proms in the Park event for the Last Night of the Proms in Heaton Park, Manchester. For the 2008 Prom season, members of the chorus joined the City of Birmingham Symphony Chorus and BBC Philharmonic Orchestra for Prom 75; the programme included Beethoven's Symphony No. 9 (sung from memory) and his Elegischer Gesang.

=== 75th anniversary ===
For the 75th anniversary (2010-11 season) of the chorus a commemorative book was published by the longest serving member, Bill Smyllie. The chorus also appeared on Songs of Praise, working once again with their patron Sam West in Walton's Henry V and performing a number of large scale works such as Elgar's The Dream of Gerontius and Verdi's Requiem.

== Membership and organisation ==
The chorus is run by an elected committee of volunteers and consists of soprano, alto, tenor and bass sections. Membership of the chorus is by audition and all members are re-auditioned on a regular basis. The musical director is assisted by an accompanist and voice coach.

== Discography ==
Year of release	Format	Work	Composer	Conductor	Orchestra	Record label	Catalogue number
1999	CD	The Dream of Gerontius	Sir Edward Elgar	Sir John Barbirolli	Hallé Orchestra	EMI	CMS7631852/CZS5735792
2002	CD	Scott of the Antarctic	Ralph Vaughan Williams	Rumon Gamba	BBC Philharmonic Orchestra	Chandos	CHAN10007
2002	CD	The Maxim Trilogy	Dmitri Shostakovich	Vassily Sinaisky	BBC Philharmonic Orchestra	Chandos	CHAN10023
2007	CD	Festival Overture	Cyril Scott	Martyn Brabbins	BBC Philharmonic Orchestra	Chandos	CHAN10407
2009	CD	Crown of India	Sir Edward Elgar	Sir Andrew Davis	BBC Philharmonic Orchestra	Chandos	CHAN10570(2)
2010	DVD	The Armed Man - A Mass for Peace	Karl Jenkins	John Pryce-Jones	Black Dyke Band	World of Brass	
