= John Henry Matthews Robson =

British colonial official and newspaper proprietor-journalist in Malaya

John Henry Matthews Robson CBE
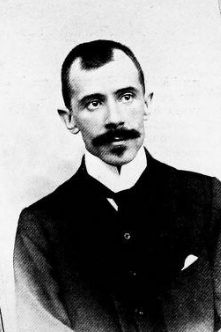
- From a 1908 publication
- Born: 8 May 1870
- Died: 1945 (aged 74–75); Prisoner of war camp in Singapore
- Occupations: Colonial administrator, and newspaper proprietor and journalist
- Known for: Founder of the Malay Mail, the first daily newspaper in the Federated Malay States
- Spouse: Theodora Sayers
- Children: 2 daughters and 1 son

John Henry Matthews Robson CBE (8 May 1870 – 1945) was a British colonial administrator and founder of the Malay Mail newspaper, the first daily newspaper to be published in the Federated Malay States.

== Early life ==
Robson was born on 8 May 1870, the eldest son of Rev Robson of Guildford, Surrey, and was educated at Christ's College, Finchley.

== Career ==
In 1889, Robson went to Ceylon to work as a trainee on a tea estate but left the same year and entered the service of the Selangor government. For the next seven years, he occupied various positions including as officer in charge of Rawang and Sepang districts, as District Officer of Klang and Ulu Langat districts, and as Collector of Land Revenue and Registrar of Titles at Kuala Lumpur.

In 1896, Robson resigned as a government official and founded the Malay Mail, the first daily newspaper to be published in the Federated Malay States. He had had some previous experience in journalism having co-founded and contributed to the short-lived Selangor Journal (1892 to 1897). He was assisted in the beginning by the editor of the Straits Times, Arnot Reid, who purchased the plant and machinery for him, and provided advice and assistance.

The newspaper began as a four-page, hand-printed publication, with an initial circulation of a few hundred, and was created in a small shop-house in Kuala Lumpur. Robson, who was joint proprietor, personally ran the newspaper, whilst his partner, who was a British government official, had no involvement in the management. In 1901, he incorporated the newspaper as Malay Mail Press Co., Ltd. with an initial capital of $15,000, and became its managing director whilst continuing to assist with its editing.

Whilst head of the Malay Mail, he also served on numerous boards and committees including the Kuala Lumpur Sanitary Board, and as a founder member of the Federal Council where he served from 1909 to 1918. On the occasion of the newspaper's golden jubilee in 1947 Edward Gent, Governor of the Malayan Union unveiled a tablet in his honour as founder.

== Publications ==
People in a Native State, Selangor Laws (1896), and Records and Recollections 1889-1934 (1934).

== Personal life and death ==
Robson married Theodora Sayers in 1921 and they had two daughters, and a son who died whilst fighting in World War Two.

Robson died as a prisoner of war in 1945 having been incarcerated by the Japanese army in Singapore.

== Honours and legacy ==
Robson was appointed a Commander of the Order of the British Empire (CBE) in the 1926 Birthday Honours. Jalan Robson and Robson Heights in Kuala Lumpur were named after him.
