= Joe McElderry discography =

List of songs by British pop singer Joe McElderry

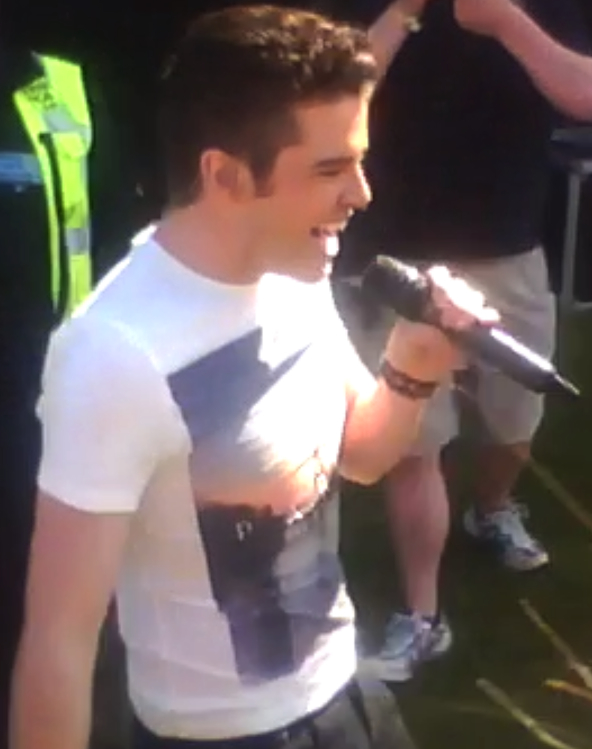
- McElderry performing at Bents Park on 24 July 2011
- Studio albums: 5
- Soundtrack albums: 1
- Singles: 13
- Music videos: 16
- Other contributions: 2

British pop singer Joe McElderry has released five studio albums, one soundtrack album, and thirteen singles on recording labels Syco, Decca and BK Records.

McElderry rose to fame after winning The X Factor and signing a million pound record deal with Simon Cowell's company Syco, His debut single "The Climb" debuted at number two selling over 450,000 copies in its first week of release. The following week, the single rose to the top of the charts and remains McElderry's only chart topper. After releasing his debut album Wide Awake, McElderry was dropped from Syco despite its number three chart placing. McElderry later signed a record deal with Decca after winning Popstar to Operastar.

On 19 August 2011 McElderry released Classic, which debuted at number two on the UK albums chart. On 28 November the same year, McElderry released his third studio album Classic Christmas, which debuted and peaked at number 15.

On 10 September 2012, McElderry released his fourth studio album Here's What I Believe. It debuted at number eight on the UK chart.

His 6th album Saturday Night at the Movies reached number ten on the UK charts in July 2017, becoming his fifth top 20 and fourth top-10 album.

== Albums ==
=== Studio albums ===
Title	Album details	Peak chart positions			Sales	Certifications
Title	Album details	UK	IRL	SCO	Sales	Certifications
Wide Awake	Released: 25 October 2010; Label: Syco Music; Formats: CD, digital download	3	5	2	UK: 105,231	BPI: Gold
Classic	Released: 22 August 2011; Label: Decca; Formats: CD, digital download	2	20	3		BPI: Gold
Classic Christmas	Released: 28 November 2011; Label: Decca; Formats: CD, digital download	15	73	16		BPI: Gold
Here's What I Believe	Released: 10 September 2012; Label: Decca; Formats: CD, digital download	8	88	9		
Saturday Night at the Movies	Released: 14 July 2017; Label: BK Records; Formats: CD, digital download	10	—	5		
"—" denotes an album that did not chart or was not released.

=== Soundtracks ===
Title	Details
Joseph and the Amazing Technicolor Dreamcoat (Note: Joe McElderry played Joseph in the 2016 UK production of Joseph and the Amazing Technicolor Dreamcoat.)	Released: 20 February 2017; Label: BK Records; Formats: CD

=== Box sets ===
Title	Details
Classic & Classic Christmas (Note: Limited edition box set includes two albums, a signed photograph and a keyring, in a ribbon wrapped box with a gift tag.)	Released: 28 November 2011; Label: Decca; Formats: 2CD

== Singles ==
=== As lead artist ===
Year	Title	Peak chart positions			Certifications	Album
Year	Title	UK	IRL	SCO	Certifications	Album
2009	"The Climb"	1	1	1	BPI: Platinum	Wide Awake
2010	"Ambitions"	6	4	4		Wide Awake
2010	"Someone Wake Me Up"	68	—	—		Wide Awake
2011	"Last Christmas"	—	—	—		Classic Christmas
2012	"Here's What I Believe"	—	—	—		Here's What I Believe
2012	"Rescue Us"	—	—	—		Here's What I Believe
2013	"Abide with Me" (with the Royal Mail Choir)	147	—	—		Non-album singles
2013	"One World One Song" (with Dionne Warwick)	—	—	—		Non-album singles
2013	"Wonderful Dream (Holidays Are Coming)"	—	—	—		Non-album singles
2017	"Gloria"	—	—	—		Saturday Night at the Movies
2021	"Baby Had Your Fun"	—	—	—		Non-album singles
2021	"I Am an Army"	—	—	—		Non-album singles
2023	"L.O.V.E"	—	—	—		Non-album singles
2026	"Love Me Out Loud"	—	—	—		Non-album singles
2026	"Phantom Of The Discotheque"	—	—	—		Non-album singles
"—" denotes a single that did not chart or was not released.

=== As featured artist ===
Year	Title	Peak chart positions			Certifications
Year	Title	UK	IRL	SCO	Certifications
2009	"You Are Not Alone" (as part of The X Factor finalists)	1	1	10	BPI: Gold
2010	"Everybody Hurts" (as part of Helping Haiti)	1	1	1	BPI: Platinum

== Other charted songs ==
Year	Title	Peak chart positions	Album
Year	Title	UK	Album
2010	"If You Love Me"	130	"Ambitions" single

== Other contributions ==
Year	Title	Album
2010	"There's a Place for Us"	The Chronicles of Narnia: The Voyage of the Dawn Treader soundtrack
2011	"Big River"	Big River, Big Songs: The Tyne
2014	"Time of My Life" (with Kerry Ellis)	Kerry Ellis

== Music videos ==
Year	Title	Director
2009	"The Climb"	Max & Dania
2010	"Ambitions"	Nigel Dick
2010	"Someone Wake Me Up"	Trudy Bellinger
2011	"Time to Say Goodbye"	Peter Fallon
2011	"Dance with My Father"	
2011	"Solitaire"	Tara Clark
2011	"Big River"	Geoff Wonfor
2011	"Last Christmas"	Steve Lucker
2011	"Adeste Fideles (O Come All Ye Faithful)"	Steve Lucker
2012	"Here's What I Believe"	Peter Fallon
2013	"Abide with Me"	
2013	"One World One Song"	
2020	"O Holy Night"	
2021	"Baby Had Your Fun"	Matt Tingle
2021	"I Am An Army"	
2023	"L.O.V.E"	Matt Tingle
