= Classic Tour =

2011 concert tour by Joe McElderry

- Tour by Joe McElderry
- Tour program cover
- Associated album: Wide Awake; Classic; Classic Christmas (from 14 November)
- Start date: 5 November 2011
- End date: 30 November 2011
- No. of shows: 19

Joe McElderry concert chronology
- The X Factor Tour (2010); Classic Tour (2011); The Set Your Soul Alive Tour (2014)

Classic Tour was the first solo UK tour by English singer Joe McElderry. The tour took place throughout November 2011.

== Support Acts ==
- Roxanne Emery
- The Reason 4
- Lorraine Crosby

== About the tour ==
For the tour, McElderry performed songs of his albums, Wide Awake, released under Syco, Classic, released under Decca, and would later add "Last Christmas" to the set, which is featured on his third album, Classic Christmas, also released under Decca. He also performed songs that was sung on The X Factor and The X Factor Tour 2010 as well as some new covers that he had never sung before. He set up a poll on his Facebook asking which song he should sing on the tour, the choices were "Home", "I Won't Let You Go", "Halo", "Someone Like You", "Your Song" or "The Edge of Glory". "Home" was chosen to be performed on the tour. The tour scored third place on Billboard's Hot Tours, with grosses of £421,219 (US$665,833).

== Setlist ==
- Show Opener
1. If You Love Me
2. Real Late Starter
3. Smile
4. Wide Awake
- The X Factor
5. Don't Stop Believin'
6. Love Story
7. Open Arms
8. Superman
9. Ambitions
10. Affirmation
11. Until The Stars Run Out
- Classic
12. To Where You Are
13. Canto Della Terra
14. Dance With My Father
15. Solitaire
16. Time To Say Goodbye
17. Nessun Dorma
- Encore
18. Over The Rainbow
19. Home
20. Last Christmas (added on 14 November)
21. The Climb

== Tour Dates ==
The first two shows were warm up gigs and were not advertised on his official website. A second Newcastle City Hall gig was added due to popular demand.

Date	City	Country	Venue
5 November 2011	Rhyl	Wales	Pavilion Theatre
6 November 2011	Margate	England	Winter Gardens
8 November 2011	Westcliff-on-Sea	England	Cliffs Pavilion
9 November 2011	Birmingham	England	Birmingham Symphony Hall
10 November 2011	Nottingham	England	Nottingham Royal Concert Hall
13 November 2011	Salford	England	The Lowry
14 November 2011	Cardiff	Wales	St Davids Hall
16 November 2011	Aberdeen	Scotland	Music Hall
17 November 2011	Newcastle	England	Newcastle City Hall
18 November 2011	Middlesbrough	England	Middlesbrough Town Hall
20 November 2011	Dundee	Scotland	Caird Hall
21 November 2011	Glasgow	Scotland	Glasgow Royal Concert Hall
22 November 2011	Liverpool	England	Liverpool Philharmonic
23 November 2011	York	England	Barbican
25 November 2011	Reading	England	Hexagon
26 November 2011	Brighton	England	Brighton Dome
27 November 2011	London	England	Royal Festival Hall
29 November 2011	Newcastle	England	Newcastle City Hall
30 November 2011	Newcastle	England	Metro Radio Arena
