= Here's What I Believe =

Studio album by Joe McElderry
- Released: 10 September 2012
- Recorded: 2011–2012
- Genre: Pop, acoustic, classical
- Length: 50:50 (standard); 1:03:09 (deluxe)
- Label: Decca, UCJ
- Producer: Steve Power, Steven Baker

Joe McElderry chronology
Classic Christmas (2011)	Here's What I Believe (2012)	Joseph and the Amazing Technicolor Dreamcoat (2017)

Singles from Here's What I Believe
- 1. "Here's What I Believe" Released: 5 August 2012; 2. "Rescue Us" Released: 19 November 2012

Here's What I Believe is the fourth studio album released by English singer, Joe McElderry. It was released on 10 September 2012 under Decca Records. It is McElderry's third album with the label, and his first album featuring self-penned songs. The album's title track was released as its lead single on 3 August 2012 in Ireland and 5 August 2012 in the UK. Four editions of the album have been released: the standard, a limited edition box set, personalized copies via Mixpixe, and a digital deluxe edition featuring 3 bonus tracks.

== Background ==
After releasing his second studio album Classic, his first album with Decca Records, McElderry embarked on his debut solo tour, The Classic Tour, and released a special holiday-themed album, Classic Christmas. In the tour programme, McElderry described the kind of material he wished to record for his next album: "I'd really like to spend some time and do some song-writing and record some more original songs, like on my first album... I feel like these past two years have gone so quick that I want to just step out of the craziness for a minute and write a nice song. Maybe write about what I've experienced." On 20 January 2012, McElderry tweeted "I know I'm on holiday ... but just been sent some new songs to listen to for ideas etc ... Can't wait to start recording!!! :D". On 26 January 2012, he tweeted he was making mood boards, song list ideas and references for the album. He spoke about the direction of the album in the Sunday Sun, saying: "This album is going to be a new direction, not classical or pop. It is going to be new and just me. People will get what they are expecting, but in a good way – it will be a nice surprise." McElderry started recording the album in February 2012.

During the recording of the album, McElderry performed at The Royal Albert Hall in support of The Hunger Project, performing "Don't Stop Believin'", "Nessun Dorma" and a duet with Dionne Warwick, "One World, One Song". He was also scheduled to make a guest appearance in the Coronation Street musical, Street of Dreams, singing the finale number "Ghost – Take My Hand" in the show's Newcastle dates, originally set for 29 May and 30 May. However, after the first two shows, the later dates, including the ones on which Joe was set to perform, were postponed. On 3 June 2012, he performed at the Thames Diamond Jubilee Pageant, performing for guests on board a Dunkirk ship, The Viscount.

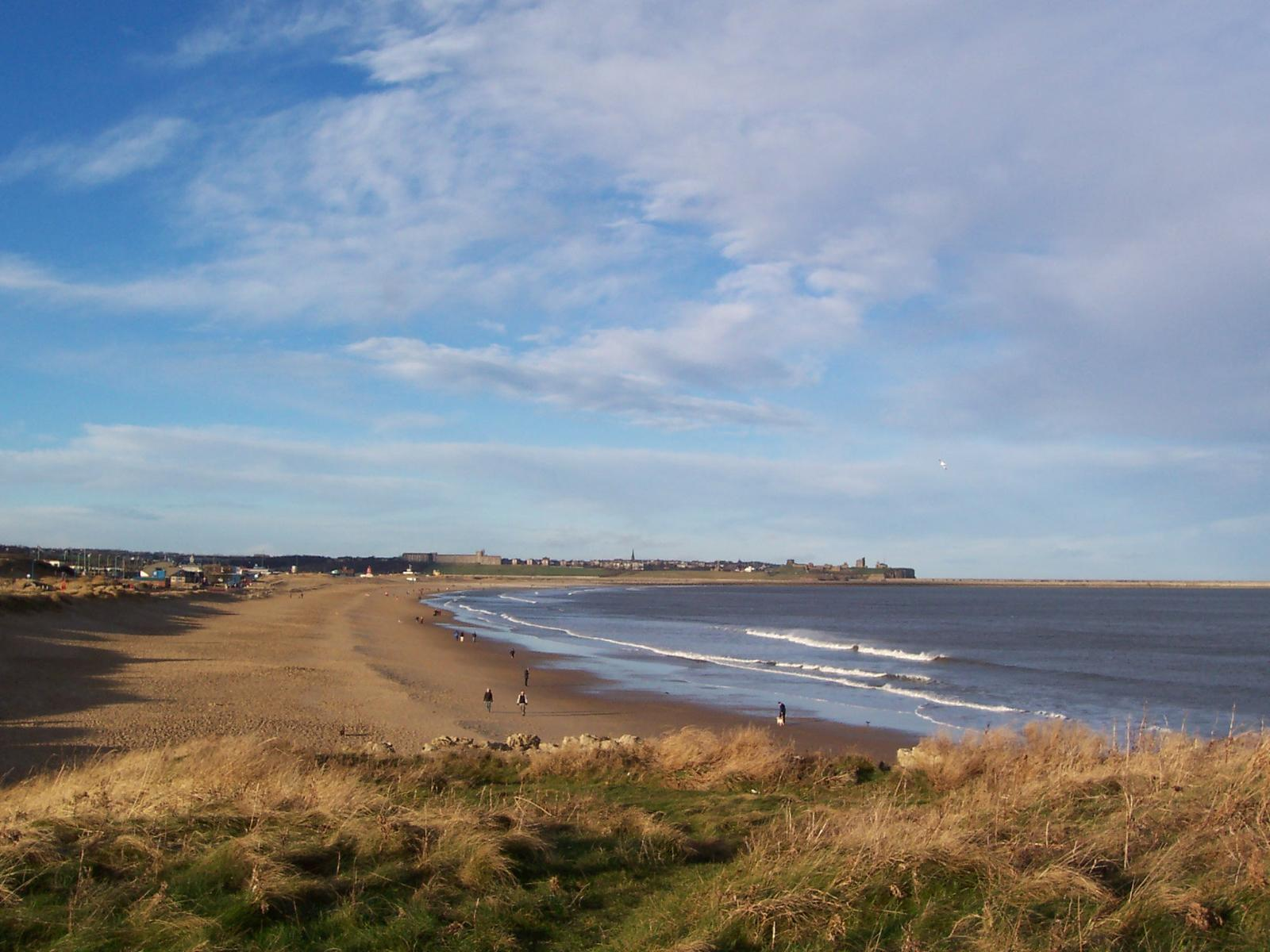
South Shields Beach. Where the artwork was shot.

McElderry finished recording the album on 2 June 2012. The photo-shoot for the album took place in his hometown of South Shields on 19 June 2012. Speaking about the photo-shoot, he said: "I’d go to the beach every Saturday and go to Minchella’s at the seafront, so I really wanted that to be part of this album. Everyone knows that I’m from South Shields, but they never really get to see where I’m from and the places I went when I was growing up, so this really gives them a chance to get to know the real me. We could have easily shot this in a studio in London but coming here has made it really special." In an interview, Joe named Katy Perry as one of his major inspirations for the album, claiming: "Katy is great at writing 'It’s your loss' uplifting break-up songs, and I wanted to write something that good. I’d been going through a rubbish time with an ex, so the first single came flooding out." The album was originally to be released on 17 September, but was pushed forward a week, now due for release on 10 September. He performed "Here's What I Believe" at Perez Hilton's One Night in London 2012 and the song premiered on BBC Radio 2 on 24 July 2012.

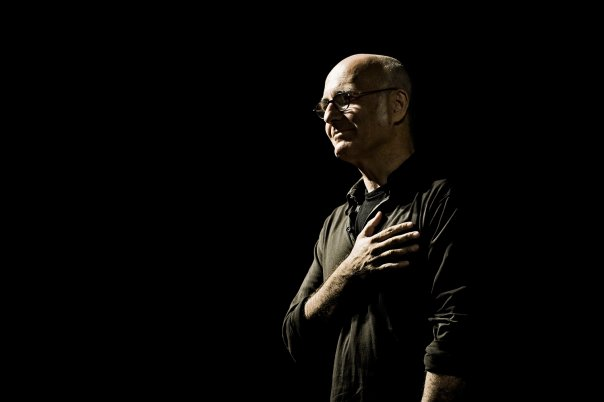
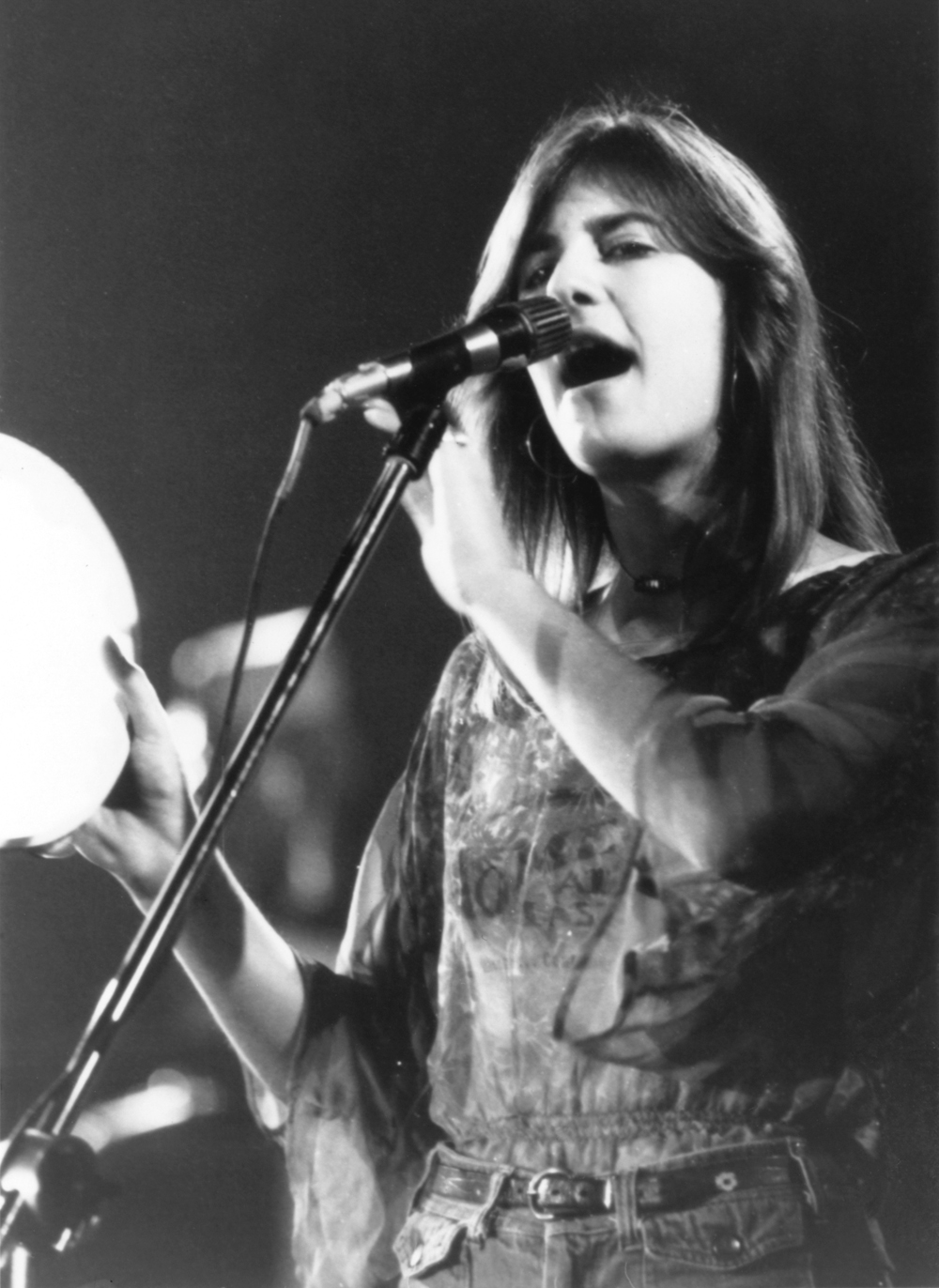
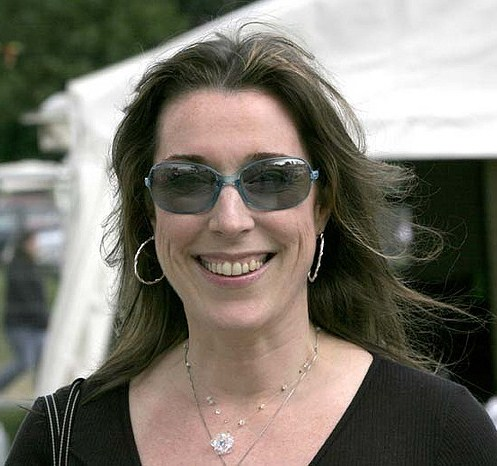
Ludovico Einaudi (left), Marcella Detroit (middle) and Beth Nielsen Chapman (right) are some of the artists who worked on the album.

The album includes collaborations with Marcella Detroit and Ludovico Einaudi. The album's title track, "Here's What I Believe", is one of six songs which McElderry co-wrote. On 15 June 2012, he performed an intimate "An Audience With..." type of show in Luton. During the performance, he confirmed that there will be one song on the album performed in Italian, and also performed a snippet of a song he wrote with Jamie Squire, featuring the lyrics; "Why does it feel so right, when really it's all gone wrong, it hurts to hear you say, that I will never be your only one.". The track was later revealed to be "What Have I Done". Another song he wrote was "Your Voice". He also spoke about the content of the album: "It’s kind of mid-tempo ballads and some emotional ballads as well – the kind of things that people know me for and will really be able to connect with. I’ve grown a lot vocally in the last year, and with me helping to write some of the songs it’s a very personal album. The last two were all covers and I didn’t have much say in the first album, so I’ve really put my stamp on this one." The album's cover songs to first be confirmed were renditions of "Something's Gotten Hold of My Heart" by Gene Pitney, "Skyscraper" by Demi Lovato, "I Look To You" by Whitney Houston "How We Love" by Beth Nielsen Chapman, and "When I Need You" by Leo Sayer before the full track list was revealed. 3 additional original bonus tracks were announced when the digital deluxe edition was available to pre-order on iTunes, these tracks were also co-written by McElderry.

== Singles ==
The title track and first single was released as a digital download on 5 August 2012. A lyric video using McElderry's actual handwriting was posted on MUZU.TV and Vevo, before the official music video premiered on Chart Show TV on 29 August and Vevo the next day. The music video was filmed in South Shields, Joe's performance shots were filmed alongside the advert for the album, the music video however also includes shots of a couple who start off happy but start arguing and break up at the end.

One of the bonus tracks from the digital edition of the album, "Rescue Us" was re-recorded and planned to be the second single of the album. Although it wasn't released officially as a single, it received an impact day on 19 November and the new version received some airplay in the last third of 2012 on various radio stations, notably BBC Radio 2, where it was B-Listed for 4 weeks.

== Sales ==
Here's What I Believe sold 10,677 copies in its first week, placing at number 8 in the charts, making McElderry become the first X Factor act to have four top 20 albums and three top 10 albums.

== Track listing ==
No.	Title	Writer(s)	Length
1.	"Here's What I Believe"	Joe McElderry, Marcella Detroit, Gavin Clark	4:04
2.	"When I Need You"	Albert Hammond, Carole Bayer Sager	3:47
3.	"To Have a Broken Heart"	Belle Humble, Jez Ashurst	3:44
4.	"I Don't Want to Talk About It"	Danny Whitten	4:13
5.	"Something's Gotten Hold of My Heart"	Roger Greenaway, Roger Cook	3:52
6.	"Skyscraper"	Toby Gad, Kerli Kõiv, Lindy Robbins	3:45
7.	"How We Love"	Beth Nielsen Chapman	4:05
8.	"Your Voice"	McElderry, Ludovico Einaudi, Helen Boulding	4:09
9.	"I Look to You (feat. London Community Gospel Choir)"	Robert Kelly	4:31
10.	"What Have I Done?"	McElderry, Jamie Squire	4:15
11.	"My Love Will Find You"	Chapman, Annie Roboff, Charlotte Caffey, Anna Waronker	3:39
12.	"Love of My Life"	Freddie Mercury	3:25
13.	"E penso a te (I Think of You)"	Lucio Battisti, Mogol	3:57

Digital bonus tracks
No.	Title	Writer(s)	Length
14.	"Mayday"	McElderry, Cass Lowe, Boulding	3:46
15.	"Silence Is the Loudest Cry"	McElderry, Clark, Boulding	4:03
16.	"Rescue Us"	Edvard Førre Erfjord, Henrik Michelsen, Gary Go, McElderry	3:54

There is also a track, In Your Eyes, on some Spotify editions of the album.

== Charts ==
Chart (2012)	Peak position
Irish Albums Chart	88
UK Albums Chart	8
Scottish Albums Chart	9
