= Saturday Night at the Movies (disambiguation) =

Saturday Night at the Movies was a Canadian weekly television series. Saturday Night at the Movies may also refer to:

- NBC Saturday Night at the Movies, an American weekly prime time network television series
- "Saturday Night at the Movies" (song), a song by The Drifters, released in 1964, written by Barry Mann and Cynthia Weil
- Saturday Night at the Movies (album), a 2017 album by Joe McElderry
- Saturday Night at the Movies, a 2013 album by The Overtones
