= The Ultra Girls =

UK musical group

- The Ultra Girls in 2011

Background information
- Origin: Leeds, England
- Genres: Pop, pop rock, teen pop, dance electropop, dance-pop
- Years active: 2008–2011
- Labels: Neon Star Records
- Members: Laura Henderson; Lauren Green; Amy Burrow; Lucy Graham
- Website: www.theultragirls.com

The Ultra Girls were a British pop girl group formed in 2008. Best known for their 2009 appearance on The X Factor, they disbanded in 2011.

== History ==
=== 2008-present: Debut ===
The group met when they were cheerleaders for the Leeds Rhinos. They first came to wider attention in 2009 when they auditioned for a place on the sixth series on The X Factor under the name Project A. The Girls made it through to the Judges Houses stage of the show, but failed to make the live finals when judge Louis Walsh decided to take a chance with Jedward.

Not giving up on their dream of chart success, the group met with Nick Whitehouse in 2010, who set up a record label specifically to work with them. Project A were rebranded The Ultra Girls the same year.

In March 2011 as part of a huge publicity tour to promote the upcoming release of their debut single, the band supported Kylie Minogue on the UK leg of her Aphrodite World Tour.

On 18 April 2011 The Ultra Girls released their debut UK single "Girls Will Be Girls"

Despite a huge publicity tour, their single failed to chart and the group subsequently disbanded.
