= Classic Christmas (Joe McElderry album) =

Studio album by Joe McElderry
- Released: 25 November 2011
- Recorded: October 2011
- Genre: Christmas; pop; classical
- Length: 44:39
- Label: Decca; UCJ
- Producer: Steven Baker; Morgan Pochin

Joe McElderry chronology
Classic (2011)	Classic Christmas (2011)	Here's What I Believe (2012)

Singles from Classic Christmas
- 1. "Last Christmas" Released: 4 November 2011

Classic Christmas is the third studio album and first Christmas album by the British singer Joe McElderry. It was released on 25 November 2011. It is his second album released under Decca Records.

== Background ==
Before the album's official announcement, it was available to pre-order from Play.com, Amazon.co.uk and HMV's website. On 6 October, McElderry announced that he was working on the album on Twitter and later on his official website. The album features a collaboration with one of his Popstar to Operastar mentors, Rolando Villazón. A limited Christmas gift edition was announced, it includes the album along with his previous album, Classic, the set also includes a signed photograph, a keyring, and a tag from McElderry on the hand wrapped box.

== Promotion ==
An advert was filmed, directed by Steve Lucker, it features McElderry outside in the snow, collecting logs and taking them to a large house preparing for a Christmas party, singing a selection of songs of the album. 2 short music videos were made from the footage that was filmed, "Last Christmas" and "O Come All Ye Faithful".

On 8 December, he performed at Durham Cathedral to an audience of 1,500, singing, "In the Bleak Midwinter" and David Essex's "A Winter's Tale", with a new verse written by Tim Rice. He will introduce The Nutcracker at The O2 arena from 27 December 2011 to 30 December 2011.

== Reception ==
Professional ratings
Review scores
Source	Rating
Entertainment Focus	4/5 stars
The Press	2/5 stars

Entertainment Focus praised the album, calling it "another winning release from Joe McElderry", giving the album 4/5 stars. Dan Bean of The Press found Classic Christmas a "harmless but vapid" collection of generic pop, jazz and crooning, packed with familiar seasonal standards and overproduced arrangements. He highlighted "O Holy Night" with Rolando Villazón as a standout and praised McElderry’s vocal ability, but criticised the album's blandness and described it as more of a "stocking filler" than an essential Christmas record.

== Commercial performance ==
Classic Christmas achieved moderate commercial success, particularly in the United Kingdom. During its first week of release, the album sold 34,043 copies at retail in the UK, allowing it to debut at number 15 on the UK Albums Chart. It also performed strongly in Scotland, reaching number 16 on the Scottish Albums Chart. In Ireland, Classic Christmas had a more limited chart impact, debuting and peaking at number 73 on the Irish Albums Chart. The album received a Gold certification from the British Phonographic Industry (BPI) in the United Kingdom, representing 100,000 units based on certification figures.

== Track listing ==
Classic Christmas track listing
No.	Title	Writer(s)	Length
1.	"Mary's Boy Child"	Jester Hairston	3:57
2.	"White Christmas"	Irving Berlin	3:11
3.	"When a Child Is Born"	Ciro Dammicco, Fred Jay	3:30
4.	"In the Bleak Midwinter"	Christina Rossetti	4:23
5.	"O Holy Night" (featuring Rolando Villazón)	Adolphe Adam	5:03
6.	"I Believe in Father Christmas"	Greg Lake, Peter Sinfield	3:09
7.	"Silent Night"	Joseph Mohr, Franz Gruber, John Freeman Young	3:27
8.	"Adeste Fideles (O Come All Ye Faithful)"	John Francis Wade, Frederick Oakeley	3:07
9.	"Santo Natale (Merry Christmas)"	Al Hoffman, Dick Manning, Belle Nardone	3:26
10.	"Last Christmas"	George Michael	4:18
11.	"The Little Drummer Boy"	Katherine Kennicott Davis	2:55
12.	"Driving Home for Christmas"	Chris Rea	3:37

== Personnel ==
Credits adapted from the liner notes of Classic Christmas.

- Joe McElderry – Vocals
- City of Prague Philharmonic Orchestra – Orchestra
- Brighton Festival Chorus – Choir (1, 3, 5, 7, 8)
- Brighton Festival Youth Choir – Choir (2, 5)
- James Morgan – Conductor, producer, Orchestral arrangements and programming, Keyboards, Mixing, Editing (2, 3, 5, 7, 10, 12)
- Juliette Pochin – Producer, Mixing, Editing, Orchestral arrangements and programming, Keyboards (2, 3, 5, 7, 10, 12)
- Stephen Higgins – Conductor (1, 3, 5, 7, 8)
- Steven Baker – Producer, Orchestral arrangements and programming (1, 4, 6, 8, 9, 11)
- Kathryn Tickell – Northumbrian Bagpipes
- Craig Hendry – Bass guitar
- Per Lindvall – Drums
- Friðrik Karlsson – Guitar (1, 4)
- Andy Greenwood – Trumpet (12)
- Lucia Svehlova – Violin (9)
- Rolando Villazón – Vocals (5)

== Charts ==
Weekly chart performance for Classic Christmas
Chart (2011)	Peak position
Irish Albums (IRMA)	73
Scottish Albums (OCC)	16
UK Albums (OCC)	15

== Certifications ==
Certifications for Classic Christmas
Region	Certification	Certified units/sales
United Kingdom (BPI)	Gold	100,000^{^}
^{*} Sales figures based on certification alone.^{^} Shipments figures based on certification alone.^{‡} Sales+streaming figures based on certification alone.

== Release history ==
Classic Christmas release history
Region	Date	Format
Ireland	25 November 2011	CD; digital download
United Kingdom	28 November 2011	CD; digital download
