= Saturday Night at the Movies (album) =

Studio album by Joe McElderry
- Released: 14 July 2017
- Genre: Pop
- Labels: BK Records, Decca

Joe McElderry chronology
Joseph and the Amazing Technicolor Dreamcoat (2017)	Saturday Night at the Movies (2017)

Singles from Saturday Night at the Movies
- 1. "Gloria" Released: 17 March 2017

Saturday Night at the Movies is the fifth studio album released by English singer, Joe McElderry. The album features a collection of songs from films and musicals. The album was announced in May 2017 with McElderry saying; "My new album is a snapshot of where I am today and I am excited about the opportunity to share some of my favourite music with my fans. I hope people will join me as I continue on this musical journey!"

The album was released on 14 July 2017 by Decca Records.

McElderry promoted the album with a "Saturday Night at the Movies" national tour throughout July and August 2017, featuring Lloyd Daniels from the sixth series of The X Factor and Keith Jack and Ben James-Ellis from Any Dream Will Do.

== Singles ==
"Gloria" was released on 17 March 2017.

== Reception ==
Laura Klonowski from CelebMix gave the album a positive review commenting on Joe's "Sublime" vocals saying "During the songs Joe McElderry manages to put his own unique spin on them while still maintaining the classic feel."

== Track listing ==
No.	Title	Writer(s)	From the Film/Musical	Length
1.	"Daydream Believer" (The Monkees)	John Stewart	Daydream Believers: The Monkees' Story	3:01
2.	"I Don't Want to Miss a Thing" (Aerosmith song)	Diane Warren	Armageddon	2:48
3.	"Can't Help Falling in Love" (Elvis Presley song)	Hugo Peretti; Luigi Creatore; George David Weiss	Blue Hawaii	3:22
4.	"No Matter What" (Boyzone song)	Andrew Lloyd Webber; Jim Steinman; Nigel Wright	Notting Hill	4:30
5.	"Saturday Night at the Movies" (The Drifters song)	Barry Mann, Cynthia Weil		2:43
6.	"I've Had the Time of My Life (featuring Kerry Ellis)" (Bill Medley and Jennifer Warnes song)	John DeNicola; Donald Markowitz; Franke Previte	Dirty Dancing	4:34
7.	"If I Loved You" (John Raitt and Jan Clayton song)	Rodgers and Hammerstein	Carousel	2:12
8.	"(Everything I Do) I Do It for You" (Bryan Adams song)	Bryan Adams; Michael Kamen; Robert "Mutt" Lange	Robin Hood: Prince of Thieves	4:12
9.	"Love Is All Around" (Wet Wet Wet song)	Reg Presley	Four Weddings and a Funeral	3:49
10.	"Love Never Dies"	Andrew Lloyd Webber; Glenn Slater	Love Never Dies	4:36
11.	"I'm into Something Good" (Herman's Hermits song)	Gerry Goffin; Carole King	The Naked Gun: From the Files of Police Squad!	4:36
12.	"Show Me Heaven" (Maria McKee song)	Maria McKee; Eric Rackin; Jay Rifkin	Days of Thunder	3:51
13.	"Any Dream Will Do / Close Every Door"	Andrew Lloyd Webber; Tim Rice	Joseph and the Amazing Technicolor Dreamcoat	4:53
14.	"Gloria"	Elliot Davies; Graham Gouldman; Adam Bard		3:24

== Charts ==
Chart (2017)	Peak position
Scottish Albums (Official Charts)	5
UK Albums (Official Charts)	10
