= Classic (Joe McElderry album) =

Studio album by Joe McElderry
- Released: 19 August 2011
- Recorded: July 2010; Smecky Studios, Prague
- Genres: Classical; pop
- Length: 43:51
- Labels: Decca; UCJ
- Producers: Steven Baker; Morgan Pochin

Joe McElderry chronology
Wide Awake (2010)	Classic (2011)	Classic Christmas (2011)

Classic is the second studio album by British singer Joe McElderry. It was released by Decca Records on 19 August 2011 in Ireland and on 22 August 2011 in the United Kingdom. Signed copies were available to pre-order on Universal Music's online store.

== Background and production ==
After his contract with Syco expired, and winning a second TV show Popstar to Operastar, McElderry confirmed that he would be recording his second studio album, stating, "It's not going to be pop, it's going to be a lot of big, lush ballads. I wanted to do a few more ballads on my first album. It's going to appeal to all my fans. I'm going to sing a few Italian songs. I'm not going to change my voice – I don't want to scare people too much... I can't reveal which label it's with but it's an amazing label. The label was later revealed to be Decca Records. In a blog, McElderry described the album by talking about the title saying "The album is called Classic, it's classic songs, it's a classic repertoire, it's songs that everybody will know. We're kind of bringing it in and matching it to my style of my voice, but also touching a bit on the classical side as well, so it's all round a classic album". Describing the process of recording the album with a new label, saying "We're doing it quite quickly this time round, it's good to just go with the flow and just get it done and let all the creative emotions flow out very fast. It's really nice to get the experience of working with a different label that has a different kind of view on things. I've just enjoyed kind of getting in there, throwing myself into the deep end and just totally going for it."

McElderry has stated that he recorded the album in six days.

== Promotion ==
During the first half of August, McElderry did a radio tour, visiting various radio stations around the country to promote the album. "Dance with My Father" and "Over the Rainbow" received their first play during this time. McElderry performed on QVC on 18 August. "She was Beautiful" was released as a free download through his official newsletter. A music video was filmed for "Time to Say Goodbye", the video was filmed in Hackney on 8 August 2011, during the 2011 England riots. The music video was released on 22 August, the album's release date. A stripped live performance was used as the music video for "Dance with My Father". The video premiered on Entertainment Focus on 13 September 2011. A third music video was made for "Solitaire". The video features behind the scenes footage and a performance shot from where the "Dance with My Father" video was filmed, this time though, the video is in black and white.

== Critical reception ==
Professional ratings
Review scores
Source	Rating
AllMusic	2.5/5 stars
Entertainment Focus	4/5 stars
Heat	4/5 stars

On 15 August 2011, Shields Gazette praised the album, saying "the balladeer is back and, with every listen, Classic gets better and better!." Jamie Tabberer of Gay Times also praised the album, saying "A year on from his massively underrated debut Wide Awake and fresh from Popstar to Operastar victory Joe's poised to release his sophomore effort. It's an album that does exactly what it says on the tin; a sophisticated, meticulously chosen collection of classic, classy, emotive anthems." Heat magazine gave the album 4/5 stars, saying "Joe's debut Wide Awake may have been one of the most underrated pop albums ever, but after his storming victory on PTO, he has turned his talents to singing rousing opera tunes- and crikey, does that boy have a voice."

== Chart performance ==
Classic debuted at number two on the UK Albums Chart, selling 35,609 copies in its first week of release. In its second week, the album sold a further 31,001 copies and fell to number 5. It rose back to number three in its third week, with sales of 29,736 copies. In its fourth week, the album dropped to number 5 but surpassed 100,000 retail sales in the UK after selling an additional 22,835 copies It reached number 4 in its fifth week on the chart, before falling to number 9 in its sixth week and number 14 in its seventh week, exiting the top 10. Within 10 days of release, Classic was certified gold by the British Phonographic Industry (BPI). On 7 September 2011, during an appearance on the Alan Titchmarsh Show which was broadcast the following day, McElderry was presented with his official gold disc by his grandmother, Hilda Joyce. By January 2016, the album had sold more than 250,000 copies in the UK.

In Ireland, Classic entered the Irish Albums Chart at number 48. It climbed to number 38 in its second week and reached number 37 in its third week. Following McElderry's appearance on The Late Late Show in Ireland on 23 September 2011, the album rose to its peak position of number 20 in its sixth week. It subsequently declined to number 23, number 33, number 46, and number 75 over the following four weeks.

== Track listing ==
Classic track listing
No.	Title	Writer(s)	Producer(s)	Length
1.	"Canto della Terra"	Francesco Sartori; Lucio Quarantotto; Stanja Vomackova	Steven Baker	3:55
2.	"She Was Beautiful" (featuring Miloš Karadaglić)	Stanley Myers; Cleo Laine	James Morgan; Juliette Pochin	2:39
3.	"Over the Rainbow"	Harold Arlen; E.Y. Harburg	Baker	4:05
4.	"I Dreamed a Dream"	Alain Boublil; Claude-Michel Schönberg; Jean Marc Natal; Herbert Kretzmer	Baker	3:41
5.	"Time to Say Goodbye (Con te partirò)"	Sartori; Quarantotto	Baker	4:06
6.	"Il Mio Cuore Va (My Heart Will Go On)"	Will Jennings; James Horner; M.& C; La Bionda	Morgan; Pochin	4:10
7.	"Hear My Prayer"	Giacomo Puccini; Morgan; Pochin	Morgan; Pochin	2:46
8.	"Solitaire"	Neil Sedaka; Phillip Cody	Steven Baker	4:21
9.	"Dance with My Father"	Luther Vandross; Richard Marx	Baker	4:26
10.	"Va pensiero"	Giuseppe Verdi; Morgan; Pochin	Morgan; Pochin	3:04
11.	"To Where You Are"	Linda Thompson; Richard Marx	Morgan; Pochin	3:48
12.	"Nessun dorma"	Giacomo Puccini; Morgan; Pochin	Morgan; Pochin	2:53
Total length:				43:51

== Personnel ==
Credits adapted from the liner notes of Classic.

- Joe McElderry – vocals
- City of Prague Philharmonic Orchestra – Orchestra
- Brighton Festival Chorus – Choir
- James Morgan – Conductor, Producer, Mixing, Editing, Orchestral arrangements and programming, Keyboards (2, 6, 7, 10–12)
- Juliette Pochin – producer, mixing, editing, Orchestral arrangements and programming, Keyboards (2, 6, 7, 10–12)
- Steven Baker – Orchestral arrangements and programming (1, 3–5, 8, 9), Producer (1, 3–5, 8, 9)
- Nicholas Dodd – Orchestral arrangements and programming (1, 3–5, 8, 9)
- Richard Hein – Conductor (1, 3–5, 8, 9)
- Craig Hendry – bass guitar (1, 3–5, 8, 9)
- Per Lindvall – drums
- Alan Thomas – guitar (2, 6, 7, 10–12)
- Friðrik Karlsson – guitar
- Miloš Karadaglić – Solo Guitar (2, 6, 7, 10–12)
- Nick Browning – Ukulele (1, 3–5, 8, 9)

== Charts ==
=== Weekly charts ===
Weekly chart performance for Classic
Chart (2011)	Peak position
Irish Albums (IRMA)	20
Scottish Albums (Official Charts)	3
UK Albums (Official Charts)	2

=== Year-end charts ===
Year-end chart performance for Classic
Chart (2011)	Position
UK Albums (OCC)	48

== Certifications ==
Certifications for Classic
Region	Certification	Certified units/sales
United Kingdom (BPI)	Gold	100,000^{^}
^{*} Sales figures based on certification alone.^{^} Shipments figures based on certification alone.^{‡} Sales+streaming figures based on certification alone.

== Release history ==
Classic release history
Region	Date	Format	Ref(s)
Ireland	19 August 2011	CD; digital download	
United Kingdom	22 August 2011	CD; digital download	
