= Steven Baker (producer) =

Australian record producer (born 1976)

Steven Baker (born 1976) is an arranger, orchestrator and record producer, best known for his work in the UK classical/pop crossover genre. He has worked on albums and projects for a wide range of artists over the years, including Katherine Jenkins, Joe McElderry, Alfie Boe, Russell Watson, Noah Stewart, Laura Wright, Paul Potts, Hayley Westenra, Rolando Villazón, Lesley Garrett, The Priests, Gary Barlow, Only Men Aloud!, Will Martin, Faryl Smith, Friar Alessandro, Julian Ovenden, Toni Braxton, Neal E. Boyd and The Ten Tenors.

== Early career ==
Baker was born and grew up in Brisbane, Australia. After graduating from Brisbane State High School in 1993, he completed a Bachelor of Music (1st class honours and University Medal) from The University of Queensland in composition and piano. After completing a PhD in composition at the University of York, England, Baker spent six years (2001–2007) working as pianist and musical director of Australian vocal group, The Ten Tenors. He toured extensively with the ensemble all over the world, particularly in the US and Europe, performing an estimated 1500 shows with them.

== 2007 to present ==
Baker settled permanently in the UK in 2007 and has been working as a record producer, arranger and orchestrator since then. Amongst many other things, he has co-produced three albums by 2009 X-Factor winner, Joe McElderry. One of those albums, Classic, peaked at number 2 in the UK Albums Chart in mid-2011 and stayed in the top 5 for five weeks. Several of his produced tracks appeared on Gary Barlow's EP album, Sing, which spent two weeks at number 1 in the UK Albums chart in mid-2012. He also co-produced the debut album of tenor, Noah Stewart, which spent four weeks at number 1 in the UK Classical Albums Chart in early 2012 and was nominated for 'Album of the Year' at the 2012 Classic Brit Awards.

== Personal life ==
In 2008, Baker married Australian soprano, Kristy Swift, and they live in northwest London.

== Selected discography ==
According to AllMusic, Steven Baker is credited with piano, keyboards, organ, synthesiser, pipe, pedal steel, arrangement, orchestration, composition, production, engineering, cover artwork, and programming.

2004:

- Larger Than Life (The Ten Tenors). Songwriter, arranger, pianist.

2006:

- Here's to the Heroes (The Ten Tenors). Arranger, pianist.

2007:

- Rejoice (Katherine Jenkins). Arranger.
- A New World (Will Martin). Arranger.

2008:

- Nostalgica (The Ten Tenors). Arranger.
- Only Men Aloud! (Only Men Aloud!). Arranger.
- Sacred Arias (Katherine Jenkins). Arranger.

2009:

- Pulse (Toni Braxton). Orchestrator.
- An American Dream (Neal E. Boyd). Arranger.
- Wonderland (Faryl Smith). Arranger.
- Band of Brothers (Only Men Aloud!). Arranger.

2010:

- Cinema Paradiso (Paul Potts). Arranger.
- Inspirations (Will Martin). Arranger.
- La Voce (Russell Watson). Arranger.
- Noël (The Priests). Arranger.

2011:

- Daydream (Katherine Jenkins). Arranger.
- La Strada – Songs From the Movies (Rolando Villazón). Arranger.
- Double Platinum (The Ten Tenors). Producer, arranger.
- Noah (Noah Stewart). Producer, arranger, pianist.
- Classic (Joe McElderry). Producer, arranger.
- Classic Christmas (Joe McElderry). Producer, arranger.

2012:

- Glorious (Laura Wright). Producer, arranger, pianist.
- Sing EP (Gary Barlow). Co-Producer, arranger.
- Here's What I Believe (Joe McElderry). Producer, arranger, pianist.
- The Voice from Assisi (Friar Alessandro). Songwriter, arranger.
