= Wide Awake (Joe McElderry album) =

Studio album by Joe McElderry
- Released: 22 October 2010
- Length: 35:53
- Label: Syco
- Producers: Biffco; Nigel Butler; Nick Coler; Deekay; Chris DeStefano; Ray Hedges; Tom Nichols; Play Production; Quiz & Larossi

Joe McElderry chronology
Wide Awake (2010)	Classic (2011)

Singles from Wide Awake
- 1. "The Climb" Released: 14 December 2009; 2. "Ambitions" Released: 11 October 2010; 3. "Someone Wake Me Up" Released: 5 December 2010

Wide Awake is the debut album of English pop singer Joe McElderry, winner of the sixth series of British talent competition The X Factor. The album was released digitally on 22 October 2010, with a physical release following on 25 October 2010.

The album received broadly mixed-to-positive reviews, praised for its energetic pop production and standout tracks like "Ambitions" and "Real Late Starter," though criticised for heavy production and an uneven artistic identity. Wide Awake debuted at number 3 on the UK Albums Chart and number five on the Irish Albums Chart, and sold over 100,000 copies, but dropped quickly in the weeks following release. The album's singles also saw chart success: "The Climb" reached number 1 in the UK, Ireland, and Scotland and was certified Platinum by the BPI, while "Ambitions" peaked at number 6 in the UK.

== Background ==
McElderry recorded his first single "The Climb" in December 2009, releasing it on 14 December, shortly after he won the sixth series of the British television talent contest The X Factor. The singer received 61.3% of the final public vote. Joe's prize was a £1 million recording contract with Syco Music, a subsidiary of Sony BMG including a £150,000 advance payment. After completing X Factor Live tour, various meetings of the album took place and recording on the album began in July, before being completed in early September. Joe worked with producers Ray Hedges, Dallas Austin and John Shanks on the album. Simon Cowell contacted Journey for permission to release a cover of "Don't Stop Believin'", which McElderry had covered on the show before, as a single, but was declined. The album was originally planned to include a selection pop-rock, ballad and slow songs, however, the album's direction was changed upon completion of the single "Ambitions".

Ahead of the album's release Digital Spy reported that it would outsell previous male winners of the X-Factor based on pre-order charts where Wide Awake was 49% higher sales than 2005's winner Shayne Ward's debut album, 23.2% higher than 2007's winner Leon Jackson's Right Now and 40.7% higher than Steve Brookstein's Heart and Soul. McElderry had said before its release that the album had "some different elements" and is "definitely going to be a bit of a shocker", while Simon Cowell said that McElderry "has moved on to new musical territory" and that fans would be "pleasantly surprised". McElderry launched the album at G-A-Y. "Until the Stars Run Out" contains elements of "Faith" by George Michael.

== Singles ==
"The Climb", a cover of Miley Cyrus' single, was released on 14 December 2009, as the X Factor winner's single. It reached number-one on the UK Singles Chart, Scottish Singles Chart and Irish Singles Chart. It also peaked at number four on the European Hot 100 Singles chart, and appears as a bonus track on the album, for the UK and Ireland editions only.

"Ambitions", a cover of Donkeyboy's single, was released as the lead single from Wide Awake, and second overall single. The track made its debut on The 5:19 Show on 19 September 2010. McElderry performed the single on the seventh series of The X Factor on 10 October 2010, the same day that the single was released by digital download, causing the iTunes Store to crash for two minutes as fans tried to download the track. The physical CD single was released following day, reaching number 4 on the Irish Singles Chart and number 6 on the UK Singles Chart. "If You Love Me" is the B-Side.

"Someone Wake Me Up" is the third single from the album. It was released on 5 December 2010. The video contains clips from the film The Chronicles of Narnia: The Voyage of the Dawn Treader but the song will not appear in the film, however, the B-Side "There’s A Place For Us" is played during the credits of the film. The single peaked at number 68 in the UK and number 69 in Ireland.

== Critical reception ==
Professional ratings
Review scores
Source	Rating
4Music	4/5 stars
AllMusic	3.5/5 stars
The Guardian	2/5 stars
Heat	5/5 stars
OK!	4/5 stars
Virgin Media	2/5 stars
Yahoo! Music	7/10

Wide Awake received generally positive reviews from critics, with praise focused on its energetic pop production and variety of styles. Heat awarded the album five stars, calling it "the best album ever released by a winner of The X Factor," while Darren Scott from Gay Times praised Wide Awake for its energetic pop sound and variety, highlighting its mix of upbeat dance tracks, emotional ballads, and theatrical production. He praised songs such as "Ambitions," "Real Late Starter," and "Fahrenheit" for their fun, camp pop influences, while noting the appeal of tracks including "Superman" and "Wide Awake." Tom Howard from Yahoo! Music observed that the album steers away from ballads and instead leans into upbeat pop influences like George Michael, Mika, and the Bee Gees, with McElderry’s vocals often evoking a playful, Gibb-style delivery on tracks such as "Ambitions" and "Fahrenheit." He ultimately framed Wide Awake as an enjoyable pop debut that doesn't aim for longevity but succeeds in moments of charm and energy. Jaime Gill of BBC Music wrote that the album was "a disco-dusted debut of giddy pop pleasures."

AllMusic editor Jon O'Brien found that Wide Awake relied on covers and familiar pop formulas. He praised "Real Late Starter" and "Ambitions" but called much of the rest derivative, noting heavy Auto-Tune and a lack of clear identity. More mixed criticism came from The Observer, where Hermione Hoby acknowledged "nice surprises" but argued that the album was overwhelmed by "a tidal wave of production." She praised McElderry's vocal charm while noting that his voice sometimes "rides rather meekly" above the album’s large-scale arrangements. The Guardian critic Caroline Sullivan gave a more negative assessment of Wide Awake, arguing that the album's attempt to capture the "disco insouciance" of Scissor Sisters and Mika was weakened by McElderry's "perfectly characterless vocals." She criticised the heavy production, saying layers of synths, drum machines, and Auto-Tune made the album feel anonymous, though she acknowledged that "Ambitions" was catchy and praised the album for avoiding an excess of ballads. Adding to the critical backlash, Ian Gittins from Virgin Media suggested that despite early commercial promise for Wide Awake, the album mostly delivered "anodyne, written-by-committee post-X Factor fodder." He concluded sharply that McElderry embodied the archetypal X Factor winner: "OK voice, bags of drive, and utterly zilch by way of personality."

== Commercial performance ==
Wide Awake debuted at number 3 on the UK Albums Chart in its first week of release, with retail sales of 39,405 copies in the country during that week. The album fell to number 20 on the chart the following week, and to number 40 the week after that. As of November 2015, the album has sold 105,231 copies in the United Kingdom.

== Track listing ==
Wide Awake track listing
No.	Title	Writer(s)	Producer(s)	Length
1.	"Ambitions"	Kent Sundberg; Cato Sundberg; Simen Eriksrud; Simone Larsen	Ray Hedges; Nigel Butler	2:55
2.	"Someone Wake Me Up"	Liam Keenan; Collier; Hedges; Butler	Hedges; Butler	3:26
3.	"Superman"	John Ondrasik	Hedges; Butler	3:41
4.	"Real Late Starter"	Nerina Pallot	Hedges; Butler	3:17
5.	"Until the Stars Run Out"	Lars Halvor Jensen; Martin Michael Larsson; Tom Nichols; George Michael	Deekay; Nichols	3:18
6.	"Feel the Fire"	Richard Stannard; Ash Howes; Emma Rohan; Steven Malcolmson	Biffco	2:58
7.	"Fahrenheit"	HJohan Fransson; Henrik Göranson; Tim Larsson; Tobias Lundgren; Sharon Vaughn	Play Production	3:35
8.	"Wide Awake"	Chris DeStefano; David Hodges; Brian Howes	Destefano	3:20
9.	"Smile"	Blair Daly; Jeremy Bose; Matthew Shafer; John Harding	Hedges; Butler	3:22
10.	"Love Is War"	Tina Harris-Pampouneau; Jamie Hartman; Alex Reid	Nick Coler	2:25

Bonus track
No.	Title	Writer(s)	Producer(s)	Length
11.	"The Climb"	Jessi Alexander; Jon Mabe	Quiz & Larossi	3:36
Total length:				35:53

== Charts ==
Weekly chart performance for Wide Awake
Chart (2010)	Peak position
Irish Albums (IRMA)	5
European Top 100 Albums (Billboard)	10
Scottish Albums (Official Charts)	2
UK Albums (Official Charts)	3

== Certifications ==
Certifications for Wide Awake
Region	Certification	Certified units/sales
United Kingdom (BPI)	Gold	105,231
^{*} Sales figures based on certification alone.^{^} Shipments figures based on certification alone.^{‡} Sales+streaming figures based on certification alone.
