= Joe McElderry =

English singer, television personality (born 1991)

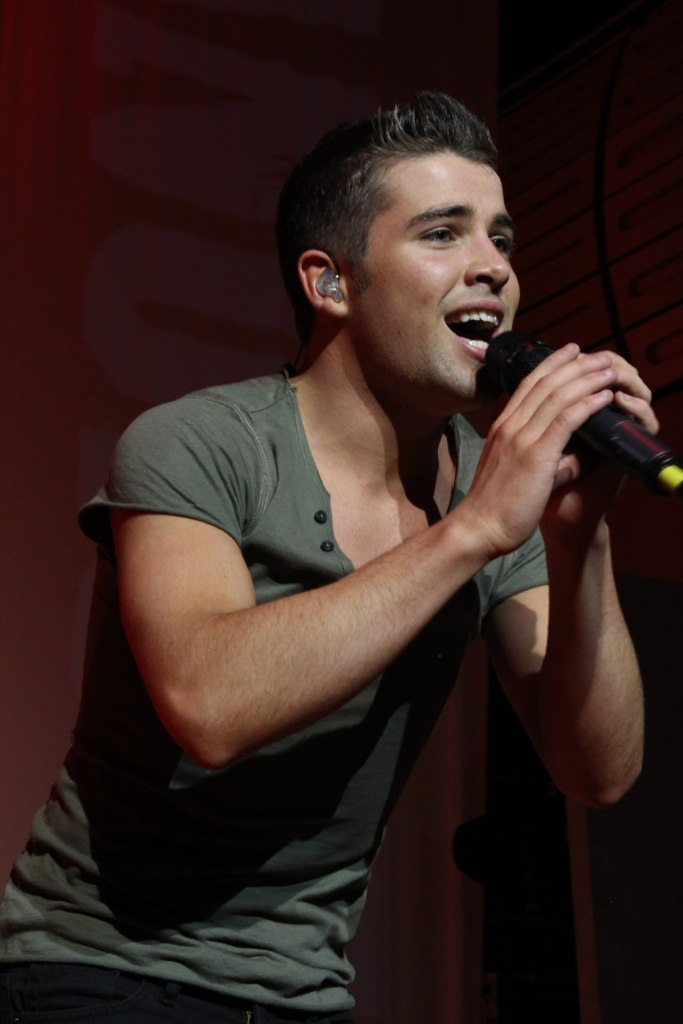
- McElderry at The Glasshouse, Gateshead in 2012

Background information
- Born: Joseph McElderry; 16 June 1991 (age 35); South Shields, England
- Genres: Pop; operatic pop; country pop
- Occupations: Singer; songwriter; actor; model
- Instrument: Vocals
- Years active: 2007–present
- Labels: Syco Music (2009–2011); Decca (2011–present)
- Website: www.joemcelderryofficial.com

Joseph McElderry (/məˈkɛldəri/; born 16 June 1991) is an English singer and songwriter. He won the sixth series of The X Factor in 2009. His first single "The Climb" reached number one on both the UK Singles Chart and the Irish Singles Charts. He was also the winner of the second series of Popstar to Operastar in 2011 and the first series of The Jump in 2014. In 2015, McElderry played the lead role of Joseph in the touring production of the Andrew Lloyd Webber and Tim Rice musical Joseph and the Amazing Technicolor Dreamcoat. In 2022, McElderry performed his Freedom Tour, a tribute to George Michael.

To date, McElderry has released five top 20 albums – two of them reaching the UK top three.

== Early life ==
Joseph McElderry was born on 16 June 1991 in South Shields, England. McElderry is the only child of Jim and Eileen (née Joyce) McElderry. The couple separated when McElderry was a child. He was raised in a small flat in South Shields.

McElderry attended Harton Technology College in Lisle Road, South Shields, before joining South Tyneside College to study AS level school qualifications. Subsequently, he joined Newcastle College to study performing arts. He was the Pride of South Tyneside's Young Performer of the Year in 2008. He studied for BTEC National Diploma in Performing Arts (Advanced Performance) at Newcastle College Performance Academy. In 2009, he took the role of 'Danny Zuko' in Grease which was performed at Harton Technology College.

== Career ==
=== 2007–2010: The X Factor and touring ===
==== The X Factor ====
McElderry auditioned for The X Factor in 2007 and made it to bootcamp. At the time, he believed that he was too young compared to the other contestants and opted to walk away. He auditioned again in 2009 and sang Luther Vandross's "Dance with My Father". Mentored by Cheryl Cole, he made it through to the live finals and was announced the winner on 13 December 2009, beating runner-up Olly Murs with his version of "The Climb". McElderry's prize, as winner, was a recording contract with Simon Cowell's Syco record label, whose parent company is Sony Music Entertainment. The contract had a stated value of £1 million, of which £150,000 was a cash advance and the remainder allocated to recording and marketing costs.

Along with The X Factor finalists, McElderry recorded vocals for on a charity single, a cover of Michael Jackson's hit "You Are Not Alone". It was released in aid of London's Great Ormond Street Hospital. The finalists premiered the song live on the edition of 15 November of the programme; the single was available for digital download that day and a physical release followed the day after. The single reached number one in the UK Singles Chart.

McElderry performed the following songs during The X Factor 2009:

Week	Song choice	Original artist	Theme	Result
Audition	"Dance with My Father"	Luther Vandross	Free Choice	To bootcamp
Bootcamp	"Praying for Time"	George Michael	Free Choice	Final 24 / To Judges' House
Judges' House	"Sorry Seems to Be the Hardest Word"	Elton John	Free Choice	Final 12
Judges' House	"Imagine"	John Lennon	Free Choice	Final 12
Week 1	"No Regrets"	Robbie Williams	Musical heroes	Safe (3rd)
Week 2	"Where Do Broken Hearts Go"	Whitney Houston	Divas	Safe (4th)
Week 3	"Sway"	Dean Martin	Big band	Safe (2nd)
Week 4	"Don't Stop Believin'"	Journey	Rock	Safe (3rd)
Week 5	"Circle of Life"	Elton John	Songs from films	Safe (2nd)
Week 6	"Somebody to Love"	Queen	Queen songs	Safe (2nd)
Week 7	"Don't Let the Sun Go Down on Me"	Elton John	Wham!/George Michael songs	Safe (1st)
Quarter-final	"Could It Be Magic"	Barry Manilow/Take That	Take That songs	Safe (1st)
Quarter-final	"Sorry Seems to Be the Hardest Word"	Elton John	Elton John songs	Safe (1st)
Semi-final	"She's Out of My Life"	Michael Jackson	Michael Jackson songs	Safe (1st)
Semi-final	"Open Arms"	Journey	Mentor's choice	Safe (1st)
Final	"Dance with My Father"	Luther Vandross	Audition song	Safe (1st)
Final	"Don't Let the Sun Go Down on Me" (Performed with George Michael)	Elton John	Celebrity duet	Safe (1st)
Final	"Sorry Seems to Be the Hardest Word"	Elton John	Favourite performance	Safe (1st)
Final	"Don't Stop Believin'"	Journey	Contestant's favourite	Winner (1st)
Final	"The Climb"	Miley Cyrus	Winner's song	Winner (1st)

==== After The X Factor ====
McElderry's debut single, "The Climb", was available to download at midnight on 14 December 2009 and was released physically on 16 December 2009. According to industry sources, approximately 100,000 copies of the single were sold on the day of its release but it was not enough to knock Rage Against The Machine off the spot in the UK in its opening week. On 18 December 2009, it was announced that McElderry secured the top spot in the Irish Singles Chart for 11–17 December 2009.

"The Climb" was a contender for 2009's UK Christmas number one, competing against, and losing to, Rage Against the Machine's "Killing in the Name". McElderry's single sold 450,000 compared to Rage Against the Machine's 502,000 after a Facebook-based campaign was started in protest of The X Factor's dominance of the Christmas number one title. This was the first time since 2004 that the X Factor winning single was denied the top spot for Christmas in the UK Singles Charts. Simon Cowell stated that he was "gutted for Joe because a number one single meant a lot to him. But I have to congratulate Jon and Tracy [Morter, who started the Facebook campaign]." McElderry's single stayed at number one on the Irish charts for a second week securing him the Irish Christmas number one (18–25 December 2009), and the song moved up to the top spot in the UK Singles Chart on 27 December. The single had the fifth highest sales of all UK singles released in 2009 staying one week at No. 1, and was the top-selling Irish single of 2009, where it remained at the top spot for four consecutive weeks.

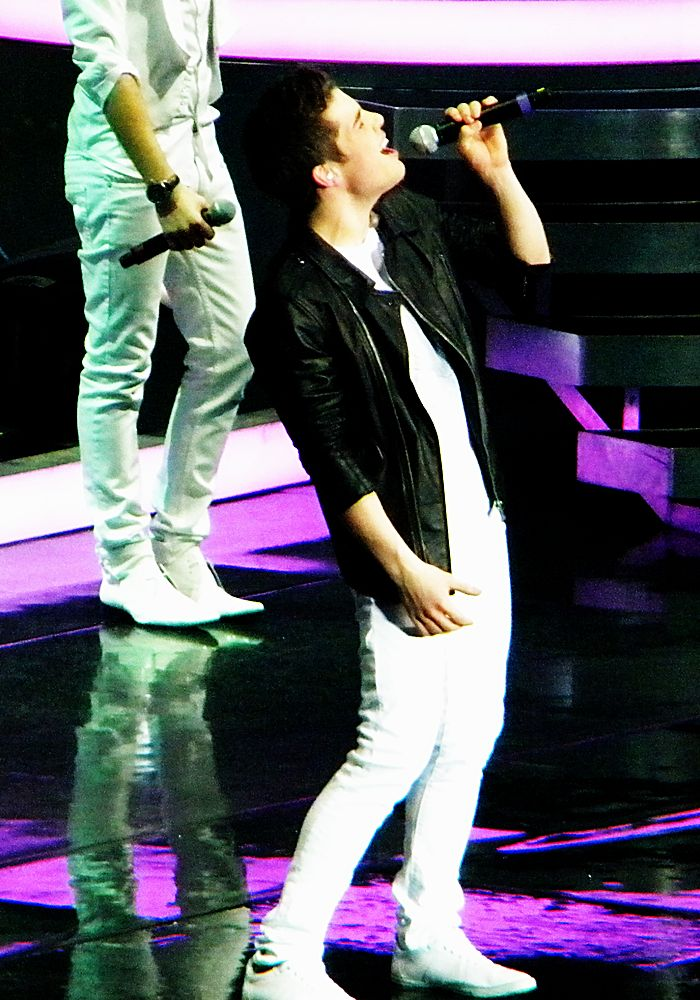
McElderry performing live at The O_{2} Arena as part of the UK The X Factor series 6 tour.

"The Climb" was nominated in the British Single category at the 2010 BRIT Awards but lost out to fellow X Factor contestants JLS. McElderry performed "Don't Stop Believin'" and presented an award at the 15th National Television Awards in London on 20 January 2010. In January 2010, he participated in the Helping Haiti charity single, a cover of "Everybody Hurts" arranged by Simon Cowell to raise money for victims of the 2010 Haiti earthquake.

On 15 March, it was reported that McElderry had signed a modelling deal with Next Models.

=== 2010–11: Wide Awake and Departure from Syco ===
In 2010, McElderry recorded his debut album, Wide Awake, which was released on 25 October 2010. The first single released from Wide Awake was "Ambitions", a cover of a song by Norwegian band Donkeyboy. He filmed a music video for the song in September 2010. Ambitions premiered on BBC Radio One on 19 September 2010.

Wide Awake debuted at number 3 on the UK Albums Chart, with retail sales of 39,405 copies in the country during the album's first week of release. The album fell to number 20 on the chart the following week, and to number 40 the week after that. As of 4 December 2011, 101,454 copies of the album had been sold at retail in the United Kingdom.

"Someone Wake Me Up" was the second single taken from the album. It was released as a single on 5 December 2010 in the United Kingdom. It debuted and peaked at number 68 on the UK Singles Chart.

McElderry was approached by Twentieth Century Fox to record the specially written track, "There's A Place For Us", written by American singer Carrie Underwood. The track features in the soundtrack to The Chronicles of Narnia: The Voyage of the Dawn Treader. and was also the B-side to "Someone Wake Me Up". The song was nominated for a Golden Globe Award in 2011 for Best Original Song – Motion Picture.

McElderry told Terry Wogan in an interview on BBC Radio 2 that he had parted ways with Syco in February 2011. McElderry told Tony Horne that he had a meeting with Syco staff members in February 2011. At the meeting, he expressed his unhappiness with the company, and told staff members that his relationship with Syco was not working for him. McElderry has also stated that his split with Syco was amicable, and there was no "fight" between them. He told the Shields Gazette: "I really like Simon Cowell and always think very highly of him .... There's no hard feelings there — there never has been and never will be." He told Capital FM on 19 August 2011 that he was "forever thankful" to Syco and Simon Cowell for the opportunity they gave him. He also denied a report (attributed to an unnamed "friend" in the Daily Mail's article about Syco's dropping of him) that he was "devastated" when Syco dropped him.

Also in 2011, McElderry terminated his relationship with Modest! Management, the management company that had managed him since his victory on X Factor.

On 9 May 2011, McElderry performed the song "Something's Coming" from West Side Story at a reception at Buckingham Palace that celebrated young people in the performing arts.

=== 2011: Popstar to Operastar and Classic ===
In late January or early February 2011, ITV approached McElderry's management about his being a contestant on the upcoming second series of Popstar to Operastar. McElderry agreed and entered the show, which started on 5 June 2011. McElderry won Popstar to Operastar on 10 July 2011. After the show it was revealed that, in all of the episodes in which he competed, McElderry received more votes than all of the other contestants combined, never receiving less than 58.2% of the total public votes.

On 11 July 2011, McElderry confirmed that he would be recording his second studio album. The label was later revealed to be Decca Records. On 24 July 2011, he headlined a free homecoming gig at Bents Park as part of South Tyneside Summer Festival 2011, singing a set list of 20 songs, with over 20,000 people in the audience- the biggest turnout the event has ever had. His album, Classic, was released on 22 August 2011. Classic debuted on the official UK top 40 albums chart at number 2 on the chart that was released on 3 September 2011.

McElderry performed at Festival of Remembrance on 12 November 2011. This was his third time performing before Queen Elizabeth II. He embarked on his debut solo tour, Classic Tour in November 2011 and appeared on Big River Big Songs: The Tyne, singing the title track, "Big River".

McElderry released a Christmas album entitled Classic Christmas on 28 November 2011. During the album's first week of release in the United Kingdom, 34,043 copies of the album were sold at retail in the country, and the album debuted at number 15 on the UK Albums Chart. On 8 December, he performed at Durham Cathedral to an audience of 1,500, singing, "In the Bleak Midwinter" and David Essex's "A Winter's Tale", with a new verse written by Tim Rice. He introduced The Nutcracker at The O2 Arena from 27 December 2011 to 30 December 2011 by singing 3 songs of Classic Christmas, "Adeste Fideles", "Silent Night" and a solo version of "O Holy Night".

=== 2012: Here's What I Believe and musical roles ===
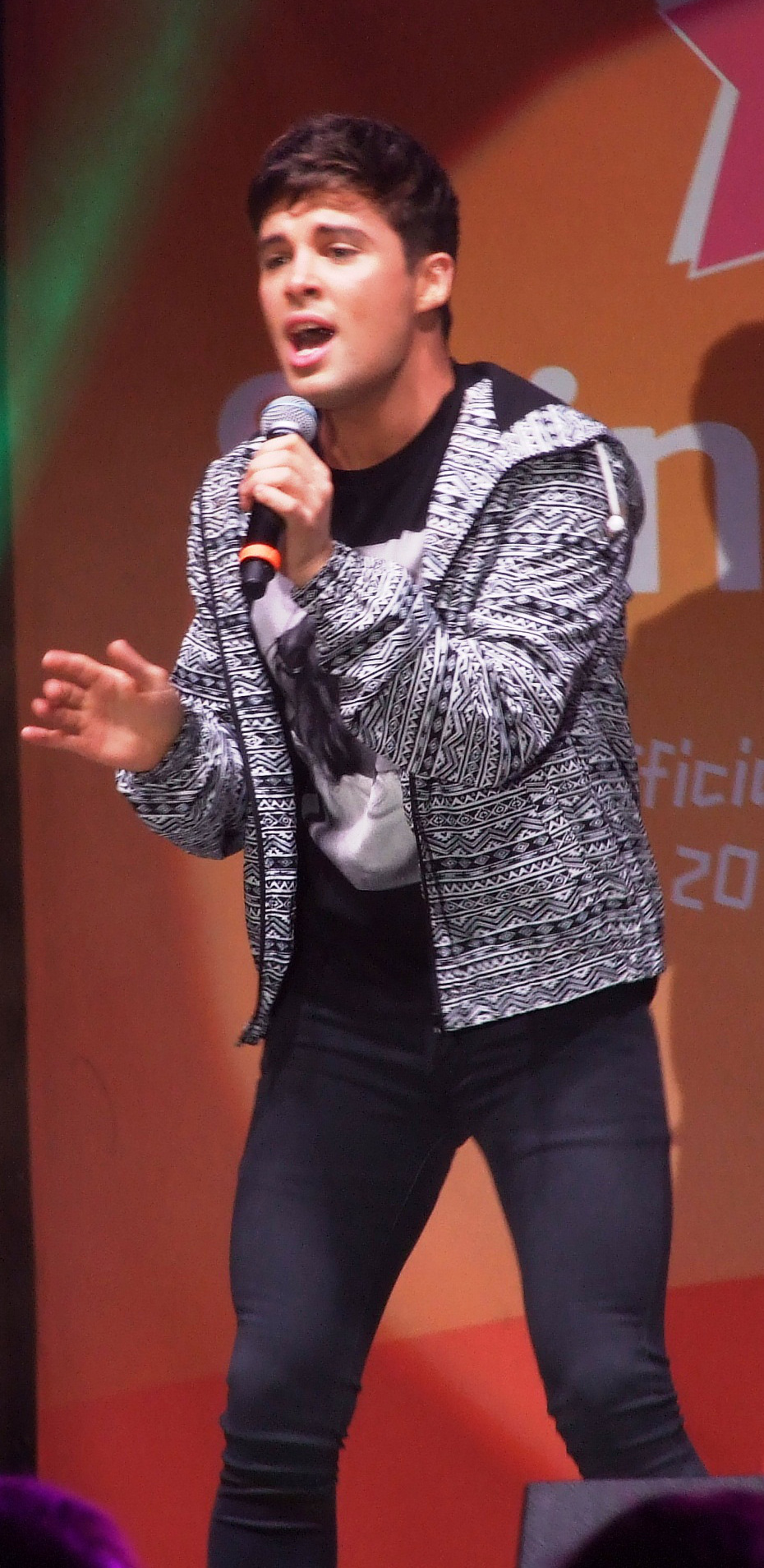
McElderry at the Paralympic Flame Festival, Edinburgh, on 26 August 2012

During the recording of his fourth studio album, he performed at The Royal Albert Hall in support of The Hunger Project, singing "Don't Stop Believin'", "Nessun Dorma" and a duet with Dionne Warwick, "One World, One Song". He was also scheduled to make a guest appearance in the Coronation Street musical, Street of Dreams, singing the finale number "Ghost – Take My Hand" in the show's Newcastle dates, originally set for 29 and 30 May. On 3 June 2012, he performed at the Thames Diamond Jubilee Pageant, he sang for guests on board a Dunkirk ship, The Viscount.

McElderry's fourth album, Here's What I Believe, includes collaborations with Beth Nielsen Chapman, Marcella Detroit and Ludovico Einaudi. Released on 10 September 2012, it reached number 8 in the charts, making it his third album to reach the top 10.

McElderry made a cameo appearance in a musical version of Dirty Dancing at the Sunderland Empire on Tuesday 25 September. He played Tommy in The Who's Tommy at the Prince Edward Theatre for a one-off appearance on 12 November

=== 2013–2014: Set Your Soul Alive Tour, Cinderella, and The Jump ===
On 8 February 2013, McElderry was awarded a Variety Silver Heart award. An event, 'A Tribute to Joe McElderry' was held to celebrate his career so far and where he was presented the award. Money raised on the evening went towards the children's charity 'Variety'. In March 2013, he appeared as a celebrity guest judge during the audition stages on the third series of Comic Relief does Glee Club.

McElderry went on tour for the summer of 2013, where he presented a new song, "Memory of You". In December 2013 and January 2014, he played the starring role of Prince Charming in Qdos Entertainment Pantomimes Cinderella at The Beck Theatre, Hayes. This was his pantomime debut, and he starred alongside Shane Richie Jr. for a 38 performance run. He also appeared as a guest on the James Whale Radio Show.

In January 2014, while on a skiing holiday, McElderry entered Channel 4 series hosted by Davina McCall, The Jump, as a last-minute replacement to Henry Conway who was injured on the show. McElderry earned a place on the show after a jump-off with another celebrity sub, Donal MacIntyre, who would also join the show after Melinda Messenger withdrew. In February 2014, McElderry was announced as the winner after jumping 17.5 metres off the K40 ski jump.

In 2014, McElderry performed a fifty‑date tour throughout the UK called the Set Your Soul Alive tour. During this period, he also worked on material for his fifth studio album. After finishing the Set Your Soul Alive tour, he appeared on Kerry Ellis’s self‑titled album in a cover of “(I’ve Had) The Time of My Life”.

=== 2015–2025: The Who's Tommy and Joseph and the Amazing Technicolor Dreamcoat ===
In September 2015, McElderry again played the lead role in the rock musical The Who's Tommy, in a two-week run at the Opera House Theatre in Blackpool.

Also in 2015, McElderry landed the lead role of Joseph in the 2016 UK touring production of the Andrew Lloyd Webber and Tim Rice musical Joseph and the Amazing Technicolor Dreamcoat. The tour began in January 2016 and ran through July 2016.

McElderry received very positive reviews for his performance as Joseph. Mark Leslie of the Lynn News called him "a shining star" in the role. Janet Tansley of the Liverpool Echo wrote that McElderry "breathed new life into this middle-aged musical", adding: "His voice was solid and silken and, simply, faultless, rendering 'Close Every Door' possibly the best version I have ever heard". Mark Shenton of The Stage wrote that McElderry "may just be the best sung Joseph there's ever been, bringing a vocal flair to Joseph that's utterly ravishing". John Wood of North West End wrote: "McElderry has been good from the moment the curtain rose; he has a good voice, obviously, and can really handle the comedy, but on Close Every Door he completely takes over, his voice filled with emotion and absolutely soaring; he has the audience breathless. He has made it his own and I can't imagine anyone performing it better. For his efforts he receives rapturous applause."

Saturday Night at the Movies, McElderry's fifth studio album, features a collection of songs from films and musicals. The album was released on 14 July 2017 by Decca Records. McElderry promoted the album with a "Saturday Night at the Movies" national tour throughout July and August 2017, featuring Lloyd Daniels from the sixth series of The X Factor and Keith Jack and Ben James-Ellis from Any Dream Will Do.

In 2023/24, McElderry appeared in a panto version of Pinocchio at the Theatre Royal, Newcastle as Jiminy Cricket.

=== 2026: "Love Me Out Loud" ===
In June 2026, McElderry released "Love Me Out Loud".

== Philanthropy ==
McElderry took part in the Great North Run half marathon 13.1 mile race on 19 September 2010 raising money for the Teenage Cancer Trust, a charity for which he is also an ambassador. He performed at The Ray of Sunshine charity concert on 11 March 2011. Two days later, he performed at the Theatre Royal, Newcastle to help raise money for Josie's Dragonfly trust. He also took part in a Comic Relief campaign, where celebrities and prolific Twitter users auctioned off the chance to be followed by a star; it raised £560.

McElderry performed on 13 July 2011 at the Newcastle Teenage Cancer Trust Unit. His acoustic set was streamed live to all other Teenage Cancer Trust units across the country as well as on the website. In 2012, he performed at the Sunday for Sammy benefit concert.

McElderry recorded a charity single with The Royal Mail Choir. The song, "Abide with Me", was released independently on 14 April 2013, raising money for Prostate Cancer UK. He took part in Soccer Six charity on 18 May. In the same month, he released a charity single with Dionne Warwick, "One World, One Song", which they had performed the year before at the Royal Albert Hall, raising money for The Hunger Project.

== Personal life ==
McElderry was harassed by one Twitter user throughout 2010 and 2011. On 24 December 2011, a man was arrested in McElderry's home town of South Shields and later charged with harassment. The individual was found guilty, fined £1,000 and received a 5-year restraining order.

On 30 July 2010, shortly after winning on The X-Factor, McElderry came out as gay, aged 19.

== Awards and nominations ==
Year	Nominee / work	Award	Result
2010	"The Climb"	BRIT Award for Best British Single	Nominated
2010	Joe McElderry	BT Digital Music Awards for Best Newcomer	Nominated
2012	Joe McElderry	Virgin Media Music Award for Best Act of Reality TV Fame	Won
2013	Joe McElderry	Variety Silver Heart Award	Won

== Discography ==
- Wide Awake (2010)
- Classic (2011)
- Classic Christmas (2011)
- Here's What I Believe (2012)
- Saturday Night at the Movies (2017)

== Tours ==
- The X Factor Tour 2010 (February – April 2010)
- Classic Tour (November 2011)
- 2013 Summer tour
- Set Your Soul Alive Tour (March – June 2014)
- The Evolution Tour (February – November 2015)
- The Northern Light Tour (October – November 2016)
- Saturday Night at the Movies (July – August 2017)
- Freedom Tour (September – October 2022)
- The Classic Collection (August – November 2024)

Preceded by Alexandra Burke	Winner of The X Factor; 2009	Succeeded by Matt Cardle
