= Popstar to Operastar =

2010–2011 British performance TV series

- Genre: Reality
- Presented by: Myleene Klass; Alan Titchmarsh (2010)
- Judges: Katherine Jenkins; Rolando Villazón; Simon Callow (2011); Vanessa-Mae (2011); Meat Loaf (2010); Laurence Llewelyn-Bowen (2010)
- Country of origin: United Kingdom
- Original language: English
- No. of series: 2
- No. of episodes: 12

Production
- Producers: Emma Greenhalgh; Jamie Wiggins
- Production location: The London Studios
- Running time: 90 minutes
- Production company: Renegade Pictures

Original release
- Network: ITV
- Release: 15 January 2010 – 10 July 2011

Popstar to Operastar [sic] is a British television programme in which pop stars were trained to sing opera. The show began airing on ITV on 15 January 2010 at 9pm. The show was repeated on TV3 Ireland on Saturday evening. The programme was produced by Renegade Pictures.

As a singing competition, it featured appropriate judges: Mexican tenor Rolando Villazón, Welsh mezzo-soprano Katherine Jenkins and rock singer Meat Loaf, as well as TV home-interiors expert Laurence Llewelyn-Bowen. Villazón and Jenkins also mentored contestants, giving them the songs to sing during the live shows. Loaf and Llewelyn-Bowen were critic-judges who talked about entrants' performances. However, after the first series it was announced Loaf and Llewelyn-Bowen would not be returning as judges. Their replacements were confirmed to be actor and opera-director Simon Callow and classical singer/violinist Vanessa-Mae. Presenters were confirmed as Alan Titchmarsh and Myleene Klass, with the non-operatic Dies Irae from Verdi's Requiem as the theme tune. For the second series, Titchmarsh did not return. Winner of the first series was Darius Campbell, and of the second was Joe McElderry.

The first episode of series 2 brought in 5.98 million viewers, bringing the show its highest ratings to date. Each week the results show featured a guest performance, normally an opera star singing to promote their upcoming album. For every vote cast, money was donated to the Nordoff-Robbins charity. The winner also received a payment for a charity of their choice.

== Format ==
The show is an opera-singing competition in which eight celebrity singers known for pop music compete to try to win the title of the show. Each week they are trained by professional opera stars (mentors) who teach them how to sing opera. The acts all perform live, giving a performance of their operatic song in an effort to impress viewers who may vote to keep them in the competition. Each performance is live on television and in front of a live studio audience. The two singers with the fewest public votes are in the bottom two and get the chance to sing again. However, their previous performance are "forgiven and forgotten" and the judges vote based on their sing-off performance who should stay. During the first series, if the judges' vote went to a tie it would go down to the public vote. However, during series two the head judge decided who stayed in the competition after the sing-off, if it was a tie. The head judge changed every week. However, if the judges voted against a contestant to stay in the competition they were eliminated. A proportion of revenue from the telephone votes was donated to the Nordoff-Robbins music therapy charity.

== Judges and presenters ==
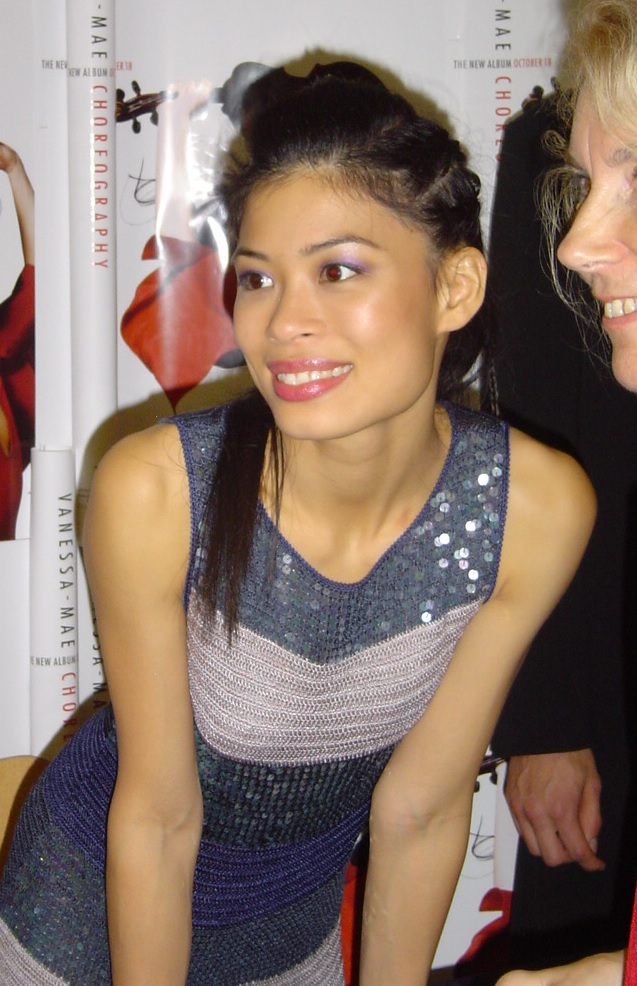
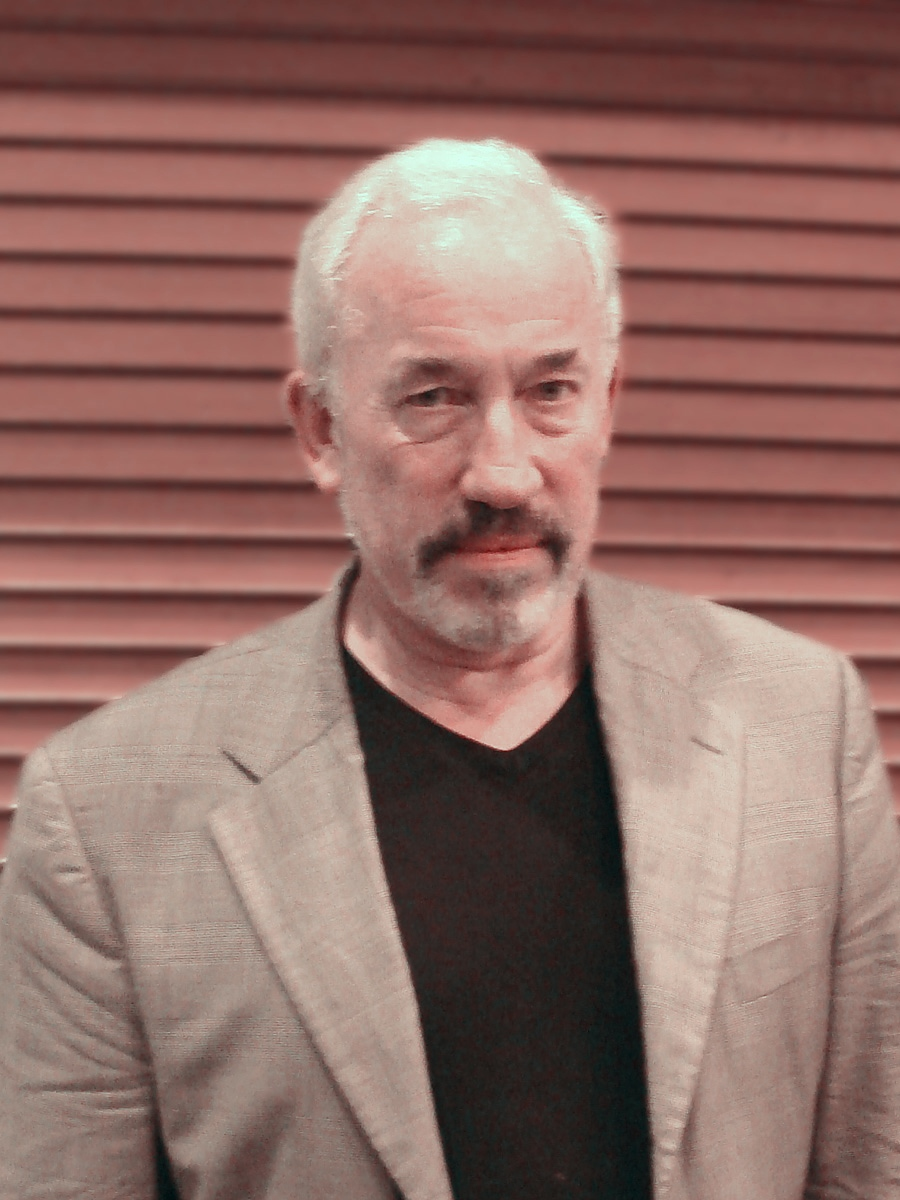
Series 2 new judges, Vanessa-Mae and Simon Callow

Once the show had been announced, there was a lot of speculation over who would be on the judging panel. It was later confirmed the show's judges were Katherine Jenkins and Rolando Villazón, who would both mentor contestants. Meat Loaf and Laurence Llewelyn-Bowen were confirmed to be judge critics, who would judge the contestants' performances only and not mentor the acts.

It was later confirmed Myleene Klass and Alan Titchmarsh would co-host the show. Titchmarsh left after series 1.

After series 1, it was confirmed Loaf and Llewelyn-Bowen would not be returning as judges and would be replaced by Vanessa-Mae and Simon Callow.

=== Table of timeline ===
Series	Host		Main Judge				Guest Judge
Series	Host		1	2	3	4	Guest Judge
1	Alan Titchmarsh	Myleene Klass	Laurence Llewelyn-Bowen	Meat Loaf	Katherine Jenkins	Rolando Villazón	—N/a
2	—N/a	Myleene Klass	Simon Callow	Vanessa-Mae	Katherine Jenkins	Rolando Villazón	Alfie Boe

== Series 1 (2010) ==
=== Popstars ===
Popstar	Solo/Group/Band	Status
Alex James	Blur (Bass guitarist)	Eliminated 1st
Vanessa White	The Saturdays	Eliminated 2nd
Jimmy Osmond	The Osmonds	Eliminated 3rd
Danny Jones	McFly	Eliminated 4th
Kym Marsh	Soloist/Hear'Say	Eliminated 5th
Marcella Detroit	Shakespears Sister	Third place
Bernie Nolan	The Nolans	Runner-up
Darius Campbell	Soloist	Winner

== Series 2 (2011) ==
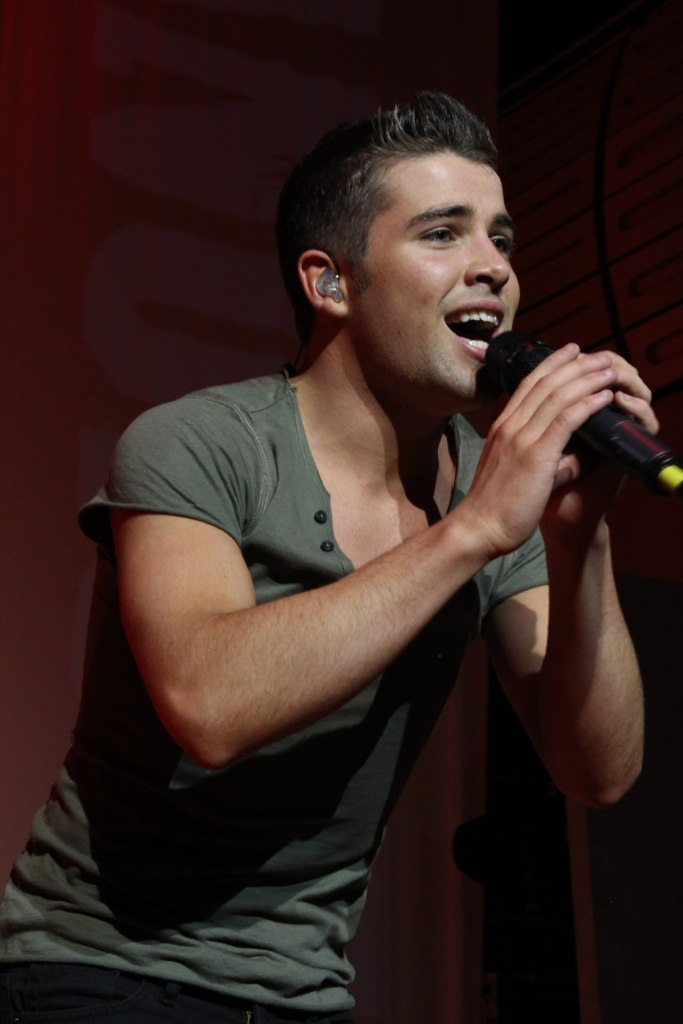
Joe McElderry, winner of series 2.

=== Popstars ===
Popstar	Solo/Group/Band	Status
Midge Ure	Ultravox/Soloist	Eliminated 1st
Jocelyn Brown	Soloist	Eliminated 2nd
Melody Thornton	Pussycat Dolls	Eliminated 3rd
Andy Bell	Erasure	Eliminated 4th
Joseph Washbourn	Toploader	Eliminated 5th
Claire Richards	Steps	Third place
Cheryl Baker	Bucks Fizz	Runner-up
Joe McElderry	Soloist	Winner
