= The X Factor (British TV series) series 6 =

Season of television series

The X Factor
- Series 6
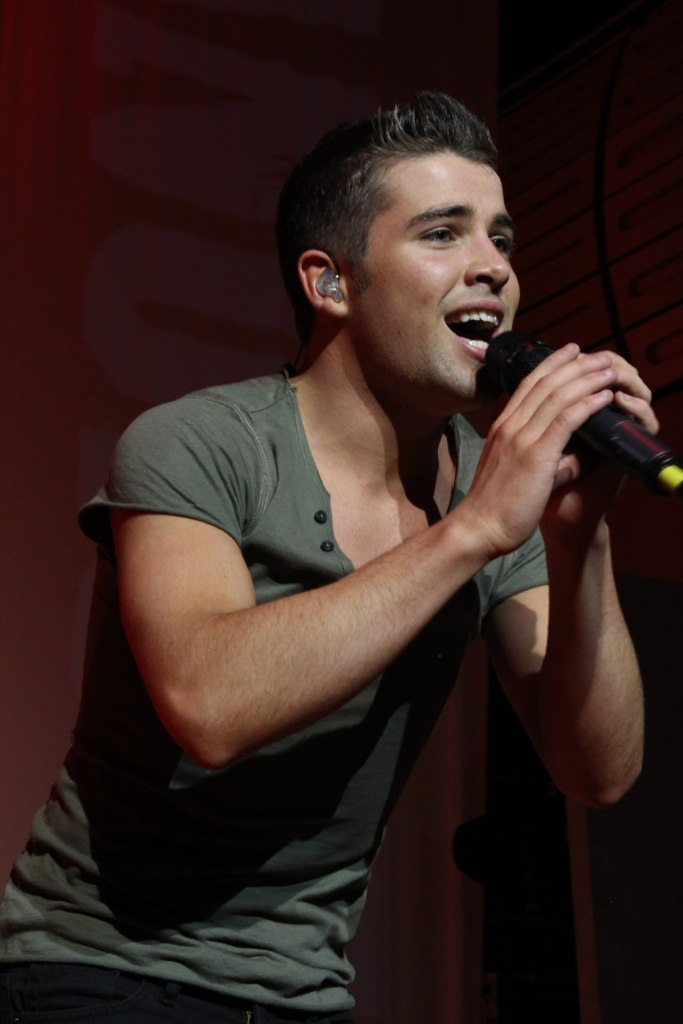
- McElderry performing at The Sage Gateshead on 25 February 2012
- Hosted by: Dermot O'Leary (ITV); Holly Willoughby (ITV2)
- Judges: Simon Cowell; Cheryl Cole; Dannii Minogue; Louis Walsh
- Winner: Joe McElderry
- Winning mentor: Cheryl Cole
- Runner-up: Olly Murs

Release
- Original network: ITV; ITV2 (The Xtra Factor)
- Original release: 22 August – 13 December 2009

Series chronology
- ← Previous; Series 5 Next → Series 7

The X Factor is a British television music competition to find new singing talent. The sixth series started on ITV on 22 August 2009 and was won by Joe McElderry on 13 December 2009. Cheryl Cole emerged as the winning mentor for the second consecutive year, the first time in the show's history that a mentor has won back-to-back series. The show was presented by Dermot O'Leary, with spin-off show The Xtra Factor presented by Holly Willoughby on ITV2. McElderry's winner's single was a cover version of Miley Cyrus's "The Climb". Public auditions by aspiring singers began in June 2009 and were held in five cities across the UK. Simon Cowell, Louis Walsh, Dannii Minogue and Cole returned as judges. This series was the first to be sponsored by TalkTalk after they took over the sponsorship from The Carphone Warehouse.

For the first time, auditions were held in front of a live audience. Following initial auditions, the "bootcamp" stage took place in August 2009, where the number of contestants was narrowed down to 24. The 24 contestants were split into their categories, Boys, Girls, Over 25s and Groups, and given a judge to mentor them at the "judges' houses" stage and throughout the finals.

During "judges' houses", the 24 acts were reduced to twelve, with one act being eliminated each week by a combination of public vote and judges' decision until a winner was found. The live shows started on 10 October 2009. The acts performed every Saturday night with the results announced on Sundays. This was change of format from previous series in which the results were announced later on the Saturday evening. This series was sponsored by TalkTalk.

== Judges, Presenters and Other Personnel ==
Judges and Presenter(s) for The X Factor Series 6

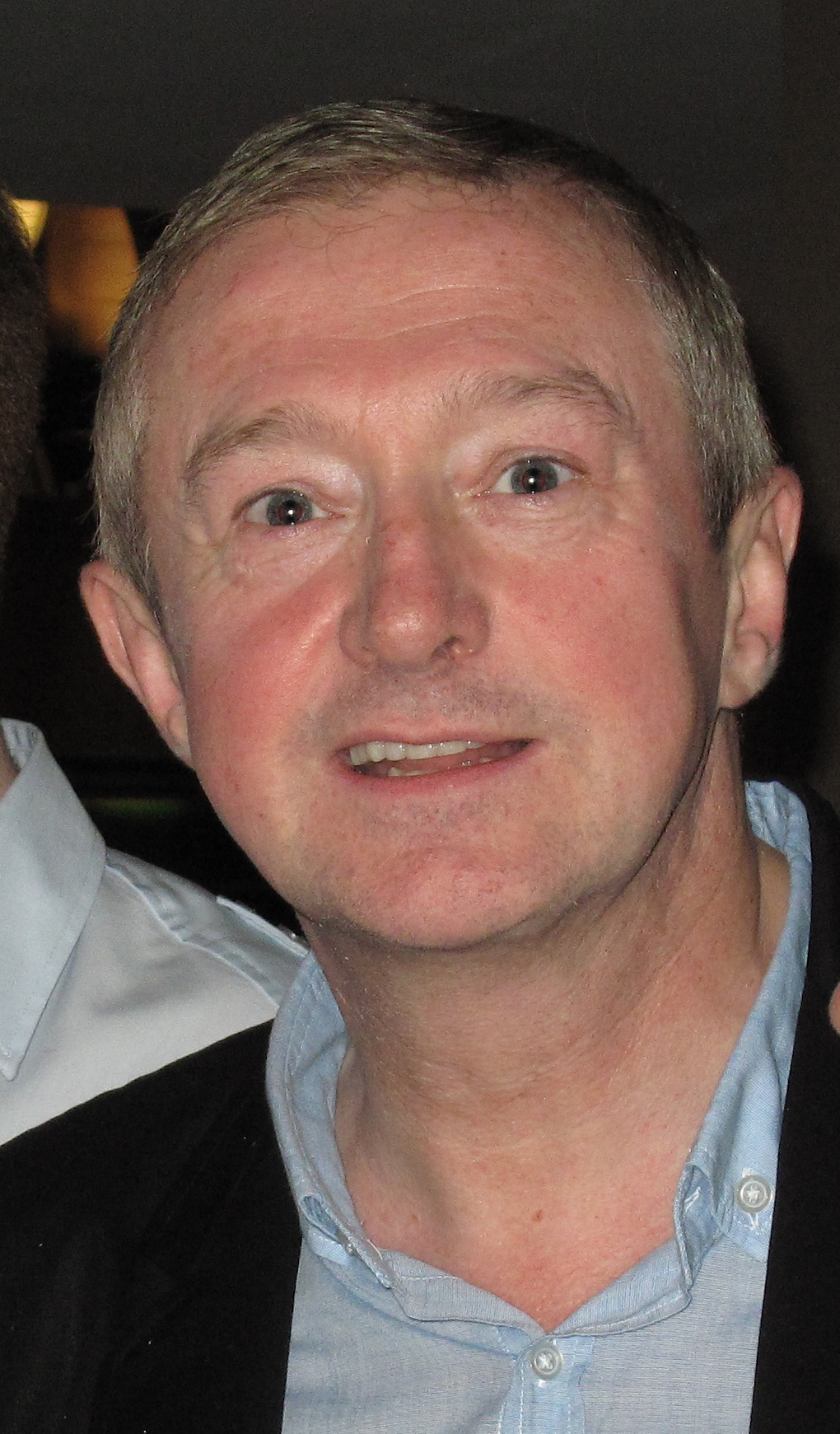
Louis Walsh

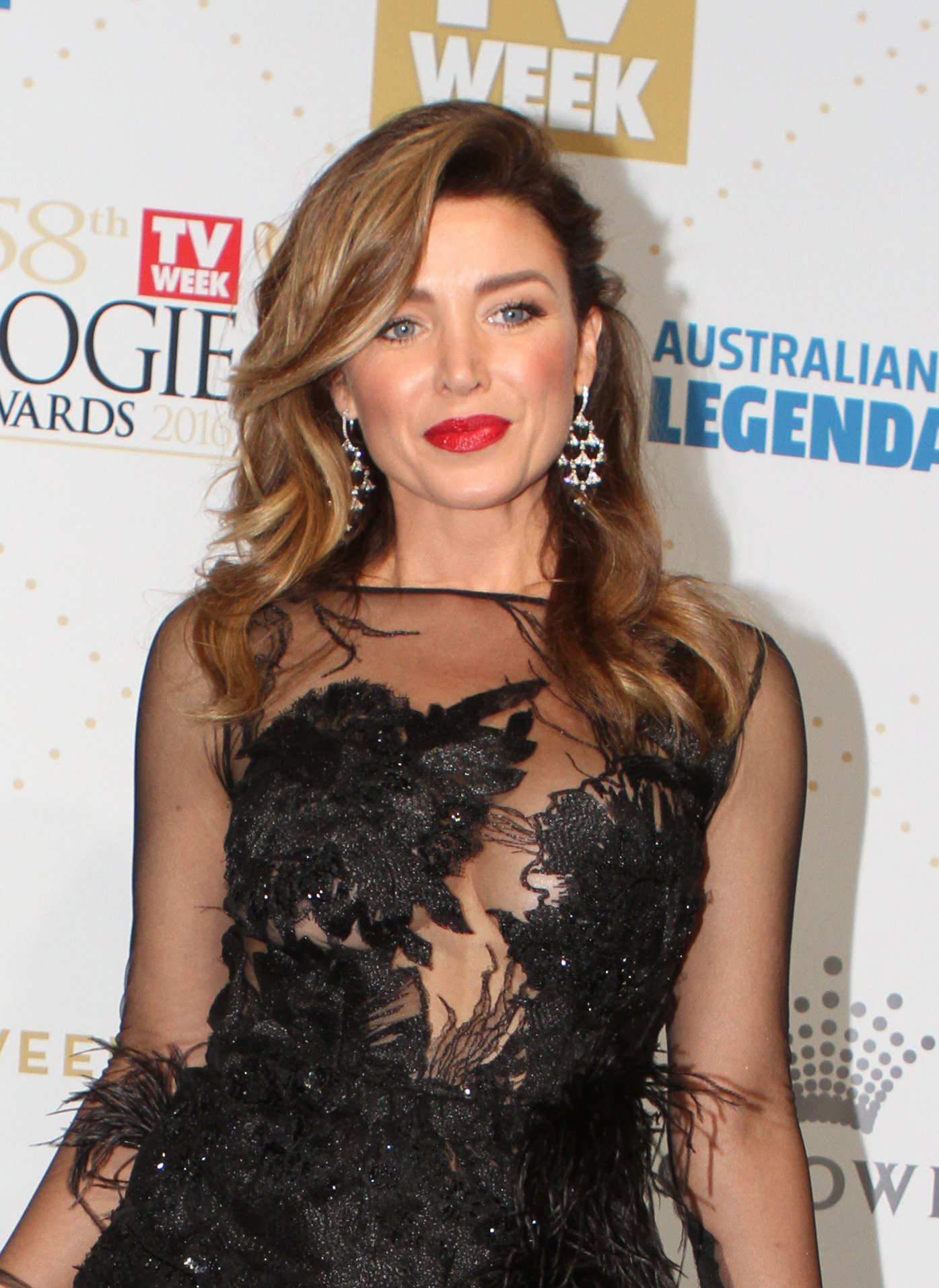
Dannii Minogue

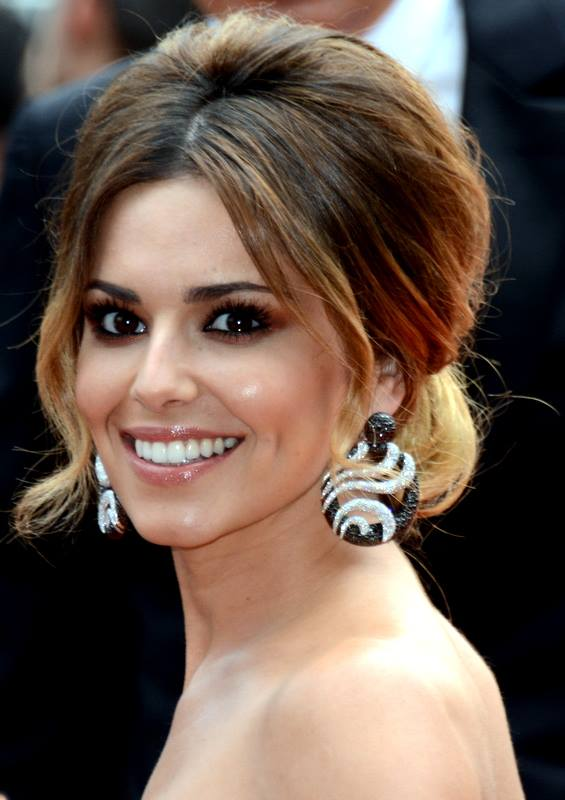
Cheryl Cole

Simon Cowell

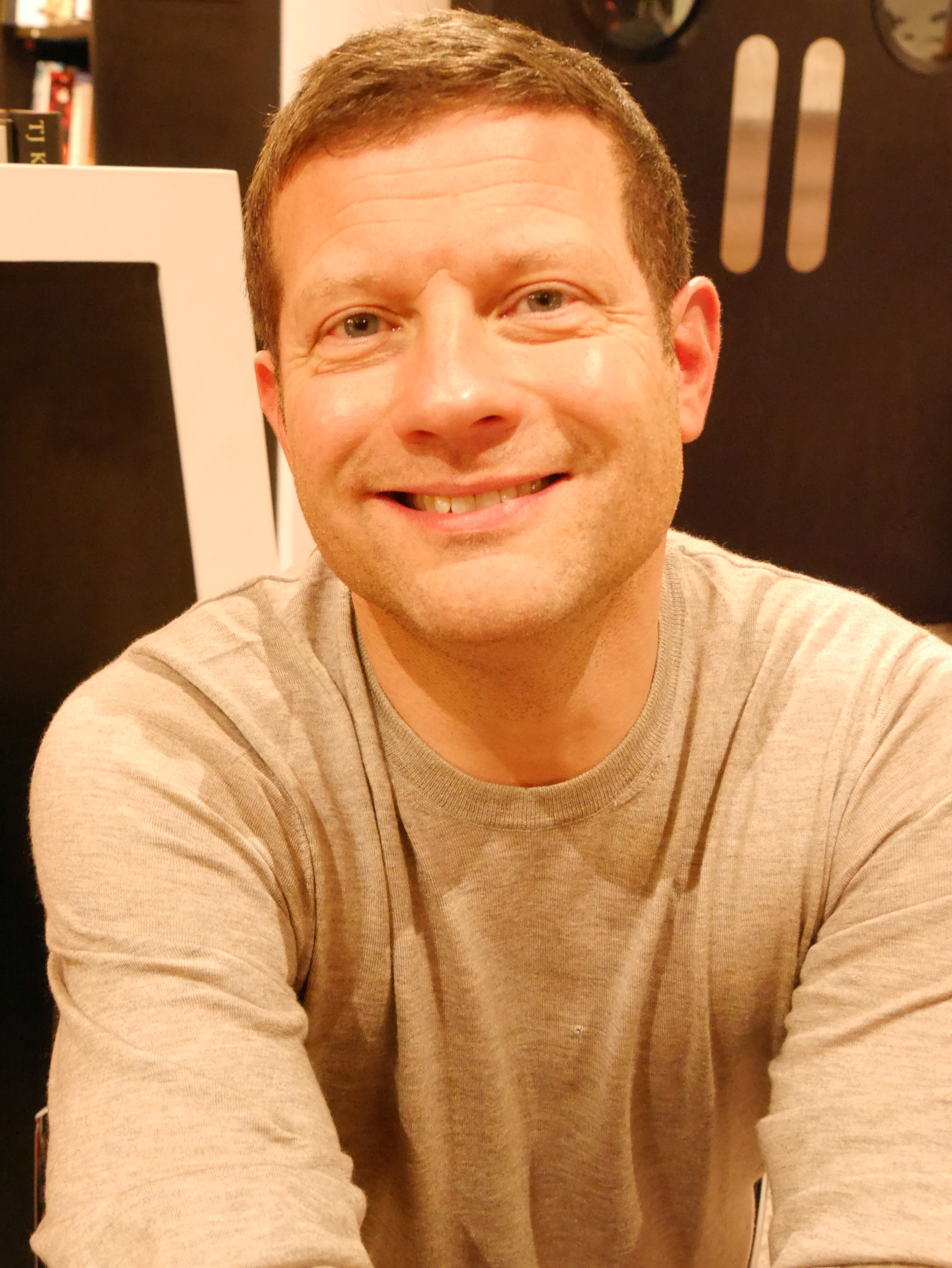
Dermot O'Leary (ITV1)

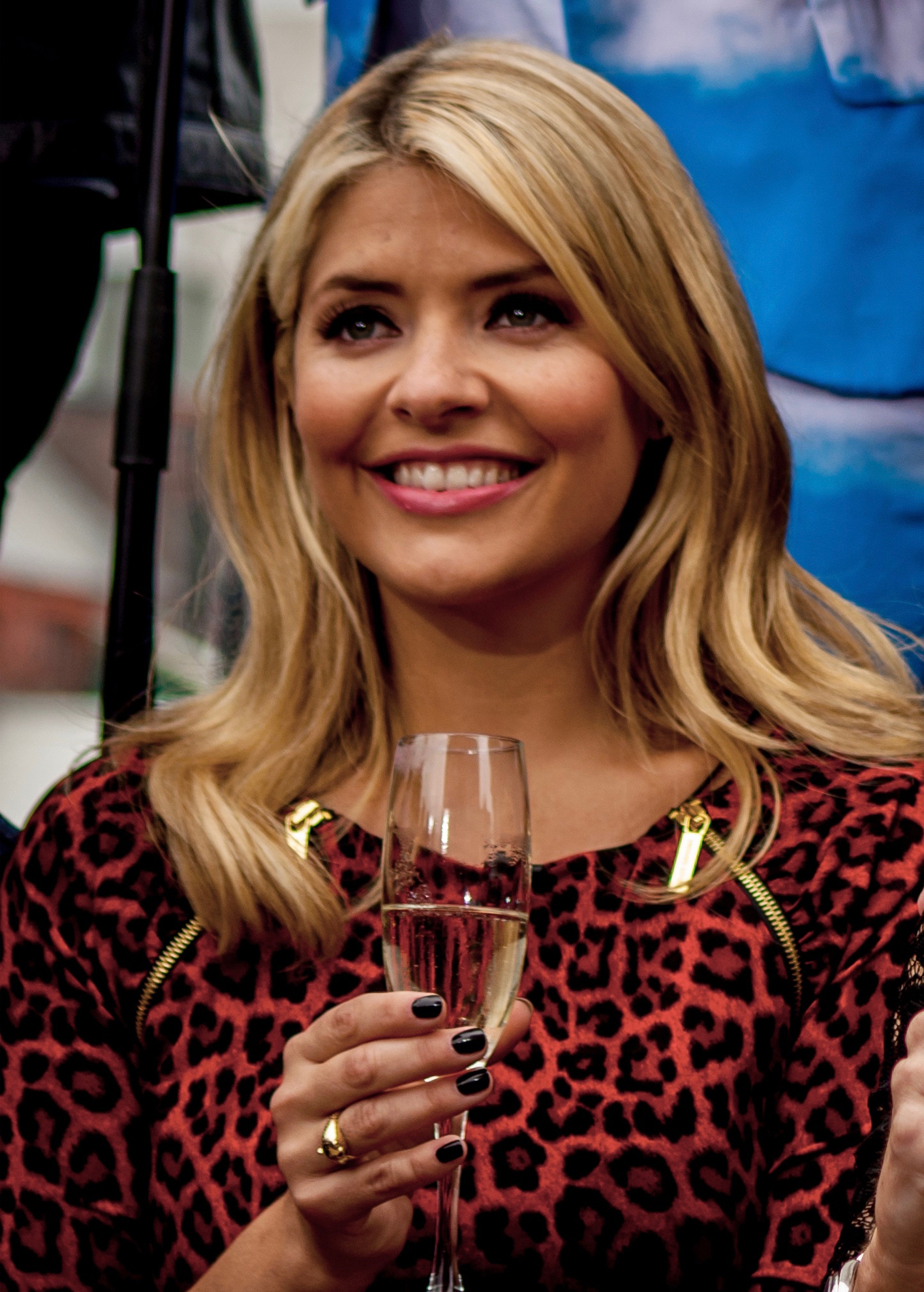
Holly Willoughby (ITV2)

During series 5, it was rumoured that Dannii Minogue would not return as a judge for series 6. Spice Girls singer Victoria Beckham was reported as a replacement for Minogue. In June 2009, however, it was confirmed that Minogue, Simon Cowell, Cheryl Cole and Louis Walsh would all return as judges for series 6. Walsh missed the first results show due to Boyzone member Stephen Gately's sudden death and missed the second week due to attending Gately’s funeral.

Dermot O'Leary returned to present the main show on ITV, while Holly Willoughby returned as presenter on The Xtra Factor on ITV2. Brian Friedman returned to the show as creative director and Yvie Burnett returned as vocal coach.

== Selection process ==
=== Auditions ===
Cities that auditions were held in.

Auditions were held during June and July 2009 across five cities: London, Birmingham, Manchester, Cardiff and Glasgow. In a change to previous series, auditions were held in front of a live audience due to the success of a similar system on Britain's Got Talent. However, Glaswegian auditionees had already been judged using the old format, meaning that they had to apply again, as their initial audition was void.

Summary of judges' auditions
City	Date(s)	Venue
London	22–25 June 2009	ExCeL Centre
Birmingham	29–30 June 2009	ICC
Manchester	3–5 July 2009	Manchester Central
Cardiff	9 July 2009	International Arena
Glasgow	12 July 2009	Braehead Arena

=== Bootcamp ===
As with the auditions, the "Bootcamp" selection stage was filmed in front of a live audience. Filming took place on 1 August at the HMV Hammersmith Apollo. Approximately 200 acts attended bootcamp. They were initially split into groups of three, and judges gave instant decisions on who would leave based on the group performances, bringing the number of acts down to 100. The judges then cut the number of acts down to 49, but called back three rejected female soloists to form a new girl group, Miss Frank, bringing the number of remaining acts to 50. Following a further set of auditions, the number of contestants was narrowed to 24. Originally, the group Trucolorz were chosen by the judges for the top 24 but were disqualified due to one of the group's members being too young for the show, and they were replaced by Harmony Hood.

The contestants were then split into the usual four categories before the judges discovered which category they would mentor for the rest of the competition. The Girls (16–24) were mentored by Minogue, Cowell mentored the Over 25s, Cole had the Boys (16–24), and Walsh took charge of the Groups.

=== Judges' houses ===
Each judge had help from a guest judge during the "Judges' houses" stage. Will Young assisted Cole in Marrakesh, Morocco, Minogue had help from her sister Kylie Minogue in Atlantis, The Palm, Dubai, Boyzone singer Ronan Keating helped Walsh near Lake Como in Italy, and Cowell had help from Sinitta in Los Angeles. At Judges' Houses, each act sang for their respective judge, and each judge and their guest eliminated three acts, leaving 12 acts to perform in the live shows.

Judges Houses Performances

- Acts in bold advanced

Boys:

- **Joe: "Sorry Seems to Be the Hardest Word"**
- **Lloyd: "I'm Yours"**
- Daniel F: "Without You"
- Ethan: "I Guess That's Why They Call It the Blues"
- Duane: "Closer"
- **Rikki: "You've Got a Friend"**

Groups:

- Project A: "What's Up?"
- **Kandy Rain: "Paparazzi"**
- De-Tour: "Tiny Dancer"
- Harmony Hood: "Never Can Say Goodbye"
- **Miss Frank: "Respect"**
- **John & Edward: "I Want It That Way"**

Over 25s:

- **Olly: "A Song for You"**
- Treyc: "All the Man That I Need"
- Daniel P: "Praying for Time"
- Nicole L: "Up to the Mountain"
- **Danyl: "Fallin'"**
- **Jamie: "Stop Crying Your Heart Out"**

Girls:

- **Stacey S: "Over the Rainbow"**
- Stacey M: "Sometimes"
- **Rachel: "Nobody Knows"**
- Despina: "The Voice Within"
- **Lucie: "Anything for You"**
- Nicole J: "Lately"

Summary of judges' houses
Judge	Category	Location	Assistant	Acts Eliminated
Cole	Boys	Marrakesh	Will Young	Ethan Boroian, Daniel Fox, Duane Lamonte
Cowell	Over 25s	Los Angeles	Sinitta	Treyc Cohen, Nicole Lawrence, Daniel Pearce
Minogue	Girls	Atlantis, The Palm, Dubai	Kylie Minogue	Nicole Jackson, Stacey McClean, Despina Pilavakis
Walsh	Groups	Lake Como, Italy	Ronan Keating	De-Tour, Harmony Hood, Project A

== Acts ==
Key:

– Winner
– Runner-Up

Act	Age(s)	Hometown	Category (mentor)	Result
Joe McElderry	18	South Shields	Boys (Cole)	Winner
Olly Murs	25	Witham	Over 25s (Cowell)	Runner-Up
Stacey Solomon	20	Dagenham	Girls (Minogue)	3rd Place
Danyl Johnson	27	Arborfield	Over 25s (Cowell)	4th Place
Lloyd Daniels	16	Treharris	Boys (Cole)	5th Place
John & Edward	18	Dublin, Ireland	Groups (Walsh)	6th Place
Jamie Archer	34	Putney	Over 25s (Cowell)	7th Place
Lucie Jones	18	Pentyrch	Girls (Minogue)	8th Place
Rachel Adedeji	18	East London	Girls (Minogue)	9th Place
Miss Frank	21–25	Various	Groups (Walsh)	10th Place
Rikki Loney	22	Glasgow	Boys (Cole)	11th Place
Kandy Rain	22–25	Various	Groups (Walsh)	12th Place

== Live shows ==
The live shows began on 10 October 2009, and continued through to the finale on 12 December 2009. Starting with this series, the results shows were on Sunday nights instead of Saturdays as they were for the first five series. In another change to the format of previous years, the remaining finalists performed a song as a group at the start of each results show. As previously, each week had a different song theme. Beginning with the quarter-final of the live shows, with five acts remaining, each contestant would sing two songs. Up to the quarter-final, the two acts with the fewest public votes were in the bottom two and would sing again in the "final showdown". The songs they performed in the bottom two were of their own choice and did not necessarily follow that week's theme. The four judges then each chose one act from the bottom two that they wanted to be eliminated from the show. If each act received an equal number of judges' votes, the vote went to deadlock and the act with the fewest public votes was eliminated. From the quarter-final onwards, there was no bottom two and the act with the fewest votes was eliminated.

=== Musical guests ===
During each results show, either one or two guest artists would perform. Series 5 winner Alexandra Burke and Robbie Williams performed on the first live results show, with Whitney Houston and judge Cole on the second. Michael Bublé and Westlife appeared on the third week, and Bon Jovi and JLS performed in week 4. Leona Lewis and The Black Eyed Peas performed for week 5, while week 6 featured a performance from Shakira. Susan Boyle appeared on the show for week 7 along with Mariah Carey. Rihanna and Alicia Keys performed in the quarter-final with Janet Jackson and Lady Gaga appearing in the semi-final. Guests in the final were Robbie Williams, Michael Bublé and George Michael (Saturday show) and Burke, JLS, Lewis, George Michael and Paul McCartney (Sunday show). In some weeks, the guest performers also mentored the acts in the run-up to that week's live show.

The choice of musical guests on The X Factor live shows had a significant impact on the UK Singles Chart. Of the seven singles that made number one from 18 October to 19 December, six of them had done so after having been performed on an X Factor live show the previous weekend. They were, in order: "Bad Boys" by Alexandra Burke, "Fight for This Love" by Cole, "Everybody in Love" by JLS, "Meet Me Halfway" by the Black Eyed Peas, "You Are Not Alone" by the finalists and "Bad Romance" by Lady Gaga. This impact was noted by several commentators. After "Bad Romance" became the sixth song to reach Number One off the back of a performance on The X Factor, James Masterton of Yahoo! Music called the show "a guarantor of Number One hits". Gennaro Castaldo of HMV remarked: "In an age when there are very few truly mass-audience platforms left, the X Factor has become pivotal for those labels and artists seeking to reach a family-based audience." Paul Williams, editor of Music Week, explained: "The impact of the programme's incredible numbers on music sales is all too evident, with the top end of the singles and albums charts week after week since the current season began heavily dominated by whoever has been on the show."

=== Results summary ===
Colour key

Act in Boys

Act in Girls

Act in Over 25s

Act in Groups

–	Act was in the bottom two and had to sing again in the final showdown
–	Act received the fewest public votes and was immediately eliminated (no final showdown)
–	Act received the most public votes

Weekly results per act
Act	Week 1	Week 2	Week 3	Week 4	Week 5	Week 6	Week 7	Quarter-Final	Semi-Final	Final	
Act	Week 1	Week 2	Week 3	Week 4	Week 5	Week 6	Week 7	Quarter-Final	Semi-Final	Saturday Vote	Sunday Vote
Joe McElderry	3rd 12.7%	4th 13.3%	2nd 12.9%	3rd 10.2%	2nd 17.2%	2nd 16.0%	1st 34.2%	1st 37.1%	1st 42.2%	1st 52.2%	Winner; 61.3%
Olly Murs	7th 6.2%	5th 10.6%	7th 8.6%	2nd 13.4%	3rd 12.9%	5th 10.3%	6th 9.8%	3rd 18.7%	2nd 19.6%	2nd 27.7%	Runner-Up; 38.7%
Stacey Solomon	2nd 12.9%	1st 15.4%	5th 10.7%	5th 8.1%	5th 10.8%	1st 25.5%	2nd 17.7%	2nd 20.1%	3rd 19.4%	3rd 20.1%	Eliminated (final)
Danyl Johnson	1st 27.1%	7th 6.5%	9th 7.6%	1st 36.2%	1st 19.6%	3rd 15.5%	3rd 15.5%	4th 12.5%	4th 18.8%	Eliminated (semi-final)	
Lloyd Daniels	6th 6.4%	2nd 15.0%	8th 8.0%	8th 5.5%	4th 12.0%	6th 9.7%	4th 12.1%	5th 11.6%	Eliminated (quarter-final)		
John & Edward	8th 4.5%	8th 5.6%	6th 9.2%	6th 6.6%	7th 9.2%	4th 14.6%	5th 10.7%	Eliminated (week 7)			
Jamie Archer	5th 8.9%	3rd 14.4%	4th 11.2%	4th 8.7%	6th 9.5%	7th 8.4%	Eliminated (week 6)				
Lucie Jones	4th 10.5%	6th 8.1%	3rd 11.3%	7th 6.4%	8th 8.8%	Eliminated (week 5)					
Rachel Adedeji	11th 2.3%	10th 3.7%	1st 15.4%	9th 4.9%	Eliminated (week 4)						
Miss Frank	9th 4.0%	9th 3.9%	10th 5.1%	Eliminated (week 3)							
Rikki Loney	10th 3.0%	11th 3.5%	Eliminated (week 2)								
Kandy Rain	12th 1.5%	Eliminated (week 1)									
Final Showdown	Adedeji, Kandy Rain	Adedeji, Loney	Johnson, Miss Frank	Adedeji, Daniels	John & Edward, Jones	Archer, Daniels	John & Edward, Murs	No final showdown or judges' votes: results were based on public votes alone			
Walsh's vote to eliminate (Groups)	Adedeji^{1}	—N/a^{2}	Johnson	Daniels	Jones	Archer	Murs	No final showdown or judges' votes: results were based on public votes alone			
Minogue's vote to eliminate (Girls)	Kandy Rain	Loney	Miss Frank	Daniels	John & Edward	Daniels	John & Edward	No final showdown or judges' votes: results were based on public votes alone			
Cole's vote to eliminate (Boys)	Kandy Rain	Adedeji	Johnson	Adedeji	John & Edward	Archer	John & Edward	No final showdown or judges' votes: results were based on public votes alone			
Cowell's vote to eliminate (Over 25s)	Adedeji	Loney	Miss Frank	Adedeji	Jones	Daniels	John & Edward	No final showdown or judges' votes: results were based on public votes alone			
Eliminated	Kandy Rain; 2 of 4 votes Deadlock	Rikki Loney; 2 of 3 votes Majority	Miss Frank; 2 of 4 votes Deadlock	Rachel Adedeji; 2 of 4 votes Deadlock	Lucie Jones; 2 of 4 votes Deadlock	Jamie Archer; 2 of 4 votes Deadlock	John & Edward; 3 of 4 votes Majority	Lloyd Daniels; 11.6% to save	Danyl Johnson; 18.8% to save	Stacey Solomon; 20.1% to save	Olly Murs; 38.7% to win
Reference(s)											

- ^1 On behalf of Walsh's absence, an automatic vote was cast against Rachel Adedeji, based on the usual assumption that he would vote to save his act who he mentored, Kandy Rain if he were present which typically occurs when a judge has their own act who they mentor in the final showdown.
- ^2 Walsh did not vote due to his absence, but confirmed on the following The Xtra Factor via phone call that he would have voted to eliminate Rikki Loney.

=== Live show details ===
==== Week 1 (10/11 October) ====
- Theme: Musical heroes
- Guest mentor: Robbie Williams
- Group performance: "I Gotta Feeling"
- Musical guests: Alexandra Burke featuring Flo Rida ("Bad Boys") and Robbie Williams ("Bodies")
- Best bits song: "Emotion"

Acts' performances on the first live show
Act	Category (mentor)	Order	Song	Musical Hero	Result
Rachel Adedeji	Girls (Minogue)	1	"Let Me Entertain You"	Robbie Williams	Bottom Two
Kandy Rain	Groups (Walsh)	2	"Addicted to Love"	Tina Turner	Bottom Two
Olly Murs	Over 25s (Cowell)	3	"She's the One"	Robbie Williams	Safe
Rikki Loney	Boys (Cole)	4	"Back to Black"	Amy Winehouse	Safe
Stacey Solomon	Girls (Minogue)	5	"The Scientist"	Coldplay	Safe
Miss Frank	Groups (Walsh)	6	"Who's Lovin' You"	The Jackson 5	Safe
Jamie Archer	Over 25s (Cowell)	7	"Get It On"	T. Rex	Safe
Lloyd Daniels	Boys (Cole)	8	"Cry Me a River"	Justin Timberlake	Safe
Lucie Jones	Girls (Minogue)	9	"Footprints in the Sand"	Leona Lewis	Safe
John & Edward	Groups (Walsh)	10	"Rock DJ"	Robbie Williams	Safe
Joe McElderry	Boys (Cole)	11	"No Regrets"	Robbie Williams	Safe
Danyl Johnson	Over 25s (Cowell)	12	"And I Am Telling You I'm Not Going"	Jennifer Hudson	Safe (Highest Votes)
Final showdown details
Rachel Adedeji	Girls (Minogue)	1	"Nobody Knows"		Saved
Kandy Rain	Groups (Walsh)	2	"Fighter"		Eliminated

Walsh was absent from the Sunday night results show due to the sudden death of Boyzone singer and close friend Stephen Gately, whom he managed. Due to this, the show did not take its usual format; there were no lights and neither O'Leary nor the three other judges made an entrance. Instead, the show commenced with O'Leary already on stage and the judges already sitting at their desk. Both O'Leary and Cowell addressed the viewers and audience regarding Gately's death and Walsh's absence. Following this, the show went on as normal with Minogue, Cowell and Cole present as judges.

Judges' votes to eliminate

- Walsh: Rachel Adedeji – despite his absence, an automatic vote was cast to save Kandy Rain based on the usual assumption that he would have voted to save his own act.
- Minogue: Kandy Rain – backed her own act, Rachel Adedeji.
- Cole: Kandy Rain – gave no reason.
- Cowell: Rachel Adedeji – said that Kandy Rain had not been given a "fair crack" in the competition and was interested in seeing them for a second week.

With the acts in the bottom two receiving two votes each, the result went to deadlock and reverted to the earlier public vote. Kandy Rain were eliminated as the act with the fewest public votes.

==== Week 2 (17/18 October) ====
- Theme: Divas
- Guest mentors: Whitney Houston and Clive Davis
- Group performance: "Queen of the Night"
- Musical guests: Cheryl Cole ("Fight for This Love") and Whitney Houston ("Million Dollar Bill")
- Best bits song: "Chasing Cars"

Walsh was absent from both shows this weekend, again due to Stephen Gately's death. The funeral took place on 17 October and Walsh paid his respects. This statement was released: "Due to recent tragic events, Louis Walsh will not be appearing on either the Saturday or Sunday live The X Factor shows this weekend as he is attending Stephen Gately's funeral. Louis has been in close contact with his acts throughout the week, although his opinions will not be represented in the show this weekend."

Acts' performances on the second live show
Act	Category (mentor)	Order	Song	Diva	Result
Lucie Jones	Girls (Minogue)	1	"How Will I Know"	Whitney Houston	Safe
Olly Murs	Over 25s (Cowell)	2	"A Fool in Love"	Tina Turner	Safe
Miss Frank	Groups (Walsh)	3	"All the Man That I Need"	Whitney Houston	Safe
Rachel Adedeji	Girls (Minogue)	4	"If I Were a Boy"	Beyoncé	Bottom Two
Joe McElderry	Boys (Cole)	5	"Where Do Broken Hearts Go"	Whitney Houston	Safe
Danyl Johnson	Over 25s (Cowell)	6	"I Didn't Know My Own Strength"	Whitney Houston	Safe
Lloyd Daniels	Boys (Cole)	7	"Bleeding Love"	Leona Lewis	Safe
John & Edward	Groups (Walsh)	8	"Oops!... I Did It Again"	Britney Spears	Safe
Rikki Loney	Boys (Cole)	9	"Respect"	Aretha Franklin	Bottom Two
Jamie Archer	Over 25s (Cowell)	10	"Hurt"	Christina Aguilera	Safe
Stacey Solomon	Girls (Minogue)	11	"At Last"	Etta James	Safe (Highest Votes)
Final showdown details
Rachel Adedeji	Girls (Minogue)	1	"With or Without You"		Saved
Rikki Loney	Boys (Cole)	2	"Flying Without Wings"		Eliminated

For the first time in the show's history, a contestant sang a cover version of a new song that had not yet even been sung live by the original recording artist. Cowell's decision for Danyl Johnson to sing "I Didn't Know My Own Strength" garnered a disapproving reception from Houston, with Cowell saying that Johnson "didn't exactly get rave reviews [from Houston and Davis] in that room [for the masterclass]."

Judges' votes to eliminate

- Minogue: Rikki Loney – backed her own act, Rachel Adedeji.
- Cole: Rachel Adedeji – backed her own act, Rikki Loney.
- Cowell: Rikki Loney – based on the final showdown performances.
- Walsh was not present for the results show, but stated through a phone call on The Xtra Factor that he would have voted to eliminate Loney.

==== Week 3 (24/25 October) ====
- Theme: Big band
- Guest mentor: Michael Bublé
- Group performance: "Fascination"
- Musical guests: Westlife ("What About Now") and Michael Bublé ("Cry Me a River")
- Best bits song: "Chasing Pavements"

Acts' performances on the third live show
Act	Category (mentor)	Order	Song	Big Band Artist	Result
Olly Murs	Over 25s (Cowell)	1	"Bewitched"	Peggy Lee	Safe
Lloyd Daniels	Boys (Cole)	2	"Fly Me to the Moon"	Frank Sinatra	Safe
Miss Frank	Groups (Walsh)	3	"That's Life"	Marion Montgomery	Bottom Two
Rachel Adedeji	Girls (Minogue)	4	"Proud Mary"	Tina Turner	Safe (Highest Votes)
Jamie Archer	Over 25s (Cowell)	5	"Angel of Harlem"	U2	Safe
Stacey Solomon	Girls (Minogue)	6	"When You Wish upon a Star"	Cliff Edwards	Safe
Danyl Johnson	Over 25s (Cowell)	7	"Feeling Good"	Nina Simone	Bottom Two
Joe McElderry	Boys (Cole)	8	"Sway"	Dean Martin	Safe
Lucie Jones	Girls (Minogue)	9	"My Funny Valentine"	Mitzi Green	Safe
John & Edward	Groups (Walsh)	10	"She Bangs"	Ricky Martin	Safe
Final showdown details
Miss Frank	Groups (Walsh)	1	"Love Don't Live Here Anymore"		Eliminated
Danyl Johnson	Over 25s (Cowell)	2	"With a Little Help from My Friends"		Saved

Judges' votes to eliminate

- Walsh: Danyl Johnson – backed his own act, Miss Frank.
- Cowell: Miss Frank – backed his own act, Danyl Johnson.
- Minogue: Miss Frank – based on the final showdown performances.
- Cole: Danyl Johnson – felt confused by the public vote and sent the result to deadlock.

With the acts in the bottom two receiving two votes each, the result went to deadlock and reverted to the earlier public vote. Miss Frank were eliminated as the act with the fewest public votes.

==== Week 4 (31 October/1 November) ====
- Theme: Rock
- Group performance: "Walk This Way"
- Musical guests: Bon Jovi ("We Weren't Born to Follow") and JLS ("Everybody in Love")
- Best bits song: "Take a Bow"

Acts' performances on the fourth live show
Act	Category (mentor)	Order	Song	Rock Artist	Result
Joe McElderry	Boys (Cole)	1	"Don't Stop Believin'"	Journey	Safe
Lucie Jones	Girls (Minogue)	2	"Sweet Child o' Mine"	Guns N' Roses	Safe
Danyl Johnson	Over 25s (Cowell)	3	"I Don't Want to Miss a Thing"	Aerosmith	Safe (Highest Votes)
Lloyd Daniels	Boys (Cole)	4	"I Kissed a Girl"	Katy Perry	Bottom Two
Stacey Solomon	Girls (Minogue)	5	"Somewhere Only We Know"	Keane	Safe
Jamie Archer	Over 25s (Cowell)	6	"Rocks"	Primal Scream	Safe
Rachel Adedeji	Girls (Minogue)	7	"One"	U2	Bottom Two
John & Edward	Groups (Walsh)	8	"We Will Rock You"	Queen	Safe
Olly Murs	Over 25s (Cowell)	9	"Come Together"	The Beatles	Safe
Final showdown details
Rachel Adedeji	Girls (Minogue)	1	"Stop Crying Your Heart Out"		Eliminated
Lloyd Daniels	Boys (Cole)	2	"You Are So Beautiful"		Saved

Judges' votes to eliminate

- Minogue: Lloyd Daniels – backed her own act, Rachel Adedeji.
- Walsh: Lloyd Daniels – praised Adedeji's vocals, professionalism, and work ethic.
- Cole: Rachel Adedeji – backed her own act, Lloyd Daniels.
- Cowell: Rachel Adedeji – could not decide and sent the result to deadlock; said Adedeji sang better than Daniels, but took Daniels' sore throat into account and thought the public were not accepting Adedeji after her third time in the showdown in four weeks.

With the acts in the bottom two receiving two votes each, the result went to deadlock and reverted to the earlier public vote. Adedeji was eliminated as the act with the fewest public votes.

==== Week 5 (7/8 November) ====
- Theme: Songs from films
- Group performance: "Hot n Cold"
- Musical guests: The Black Eyed Peas ("Meet Me Halfway") and Leona Lewis ("Happy")
- Best bits song: "I'm Not a Girl, Not Yet a Woman"

Acts' performances on the fifth live show
Act	Category (mentor)	Order	Song	Film	Result
Stacey Solomon	Girls (Minogue)	1	"Son of a Preacher Man"	Pulp Fiction	Safe
Olly Murs	Over 25s (Cowell)	2	"Twist and Shout"	Ferris Bueller's Day Off	Safe
Lloyd Daniels	Boys (Cole)	3	"Stand by Me"/"Beautiful Girls"	Stand by Me	Safe
Jamie Archer	Over 25s (Cowell)	4	"Crying"	Gummo	Safe
Lucie Jones	Girls (Minogue)	5	"This Is Me"	Camp Rock	Bottom Two
Danyl Johnson	Over 25s (Cowell)	6	"Purple Rain"	Purple Rain	Safe (Highest Votes)
John & Edward	Groups (Walsh)	7	"Ghostbusters"	Ghostbusters	Bottom Two
Joe McElderry	Boys (Cole)	8	"Circle of Life"	The Lion King	Safe
Final showdown details
Lucie Jones	Girls (Minogue)	1	"One Moment in Time"		Eliminated
John & Edward	Groups (Walsh)	2	"Rock DJ"		Saved

Judges' votes to eliminate

- Walsh: Lucie Jones – backed his own act, John & Edward.
- Minogue: John & Edward – backed her own act, Lucie Jones.
- Cole: John & Edward – gave no reason.
- Cowell: Lucie Jones – he stated that although neither act could win, he was more interested in seeing John and Edward return despite their "horrific" performances, and that there was "a ceiling" for Jones.

With the acts in the bottom two receiving two votes each, the result went to deadlock and reverted to the earlier public vote. Jones was eliminated as the act with the fewest public votes.

==== Week 6 (14/15 November) ====
- Theme: Songs by Queen
- Guest mentors: Brian May and Roger Taylor
- Group performances: "Bohemian Rhapsody" (performed with Brian May and Roger Taylor) and "You Are Not Alone" (all finalists)
- Musical guest: Shakira ("Did It Again")
- Best bits song: "One"

Acts' performances on the sixth live show
Act	Category (mentor)	Order	Song	Result
Jamie Archer	Over 25s (Cowell)	1	"Radio Ga Ga"	Bottom Two
Lloyd Daniels	Boys (Cole)	2	"Crazy Little Thing Called Love"	Bottom Two
Olly Murs	Over 25s (Cowell)	3	"Don't Stop Me Now"	Safe
Joe McElderry	Boys (Cole)	4	"Somebody to Love"	Safe
John & Edward	Groups (Walsh)	5	"Under Pressure"/"Ice Ice Baby"	Safe
Stacey Solomon	Girls (Minogue)	6	"Who Wants to Live Forever"	Safe (Highest Votes)
Danyl Johnson	Over 25s (Cowell)	7	"We Are the Champions"	Safe
Final showdown details
Jamie Archer	Over 25s (Cowell)	1	"The Show Must Go On"	Eliminated
Lloyd Daniels	Boys (Cole)	2	"Last Request"	Saved

Judges' votes to eliminate

- Cowell: Lloyd Daniels – gave no reason but effectively backed his own act, Jamie Archer.
- Cole: Jamie Archer – backed her own act, Lloyd Daniels.
- Walsh: Jamie Archer – believed Daniels would go further in the competition.
- Minogue: Lloyd Daniels – thought Archer sang better in the final showdown.

With the acts in the bottom two receiving two votes each, the result went to deadlock and reverted to the earlier public vote. Archer was eliminated as the act with the fewest public votes.

==== Week 7 (21/22 November) ====
- Theme: Songs by Wham! or George Michael
- Group performance: "Wake Me Up Before You Go-Go"
- Musical guests: Susan Boyle ("Wild Horses") and Mariah Carey ("I Want to Know What Love Is")
- Best bits song: "Let's Get Ready to Rhumble"

Acts' performances on the seventh live show
Act	Category (mentor)	Order	Song	Artist	Result
Lloyd Daniels	Boys (Cole)	1	"Faith"	George Michael	Safe
Stacey Solomon	Girls (Minogue)	2	"I Can't Make You Love Me"	George Michael	Safe
John & Edward	Groups (Walsh)	3	"I'm Your Man"/"Wham Rap!"	Wham!	Bottom Two
Danyl Johnson	Over 25s (Cowell)	4	"Careless Whisper"	George Michael/Wham!	Safe
Olly Murs	Over 25s (Cowell)	5	"Fastlove"	George Michael	Bottom Two
Joe McElderry	Boys (Cole)	6	"Don't Let the Sun Go Down on Me"	George Michael	Safe (Highest Votes)
Final showdown details
John & Edward	Groups (Walsh)	1	"No Matter What"		Eliminated
Olly Murs	Over 25s (Cowell)	2	"Wonderful Tonight"		Saved

Judges' votes to eliminate

- Cowell: John & Edward – backed his own act, Olly Murs.
- Cole: John & Edward – gave no reason, despite saying that she would be sad if John & Edward leave the competition.
- Walsh: Olly Murs – backed his own act, John & Edward; though expressed surprise that Murs was in the bottom two instead of Lloyd Daniels.
- Minogue: John & Edward – based on the premise that the show is a "singing competition".

However, voting statistics revealed that John & Edward received more votes than Murs which meant that if Minogue sent the result to deadlock, John & Edward would have advanced to the quarter-final and Murs would have been eliminated.

==== Week 8: Quarter-Final (28/29 November) ====
- Themes: Songs by Take That; songs by Elton John
- Group performance: "I Don't Feel Like Dancin'"
- Musical guests: Alicia Keys ("Empire State of Mind" / "Doesn't Mean Anything" / "No One") and Rihanna ("Russian Roulette")
- Best bits song: "You Give Me Something"

Acts' performances in the quarter-final
Act	Category (mentor)	Order	Take That song	Order	Elton John song	Result
Danyl Johnson	Over 25s (Cowell)	1	"Relight My Fire"	7	"Your Song"	Safe
Lloyd Daniels	Boys (Cole)	2	"A Million Love Songs"	6	"I'm Still Standing"	Eliminated
Olly Murs	Over 25s (Cowell)	3	"Love Ain't Here Anymore"	8	"Saturday Night's Alright for Fighting"	Safe
Joe McElderry	Boys (Cole)	4	"Could It Be Magic"	9	"Sorry Seems to Be the Hardest Word"	Safe (Highest Votes)
Stacey Solomon	Girls (Minogue)	5	"Rule the World"	10	"Something About the Way You Look Tonight"	Safe

The quarter-final did not feature a final showdown and instead the act with the fewest public votes, Lloyd Daniels, was automatically eliminated. After his elimination, Daniels reprised his quarter-final performance of "A Million Love Songs" as his exit song.

==== Week 9: Semi-Final (5/6 December) ====
- Themes: Songs by Michael Jackson; mentor's choice
- Group performance: "Wanna Be Startin' Somethin'" / "Don't Stop the Music"
- Musical guests: Lady Gaga ("Bad Romance") and Janet Jackson ("All for You" / "Make Me")
- Best bits song: "What About Now"

Acts' performances in the semi-final
Act	Category (mentor)	Order	Michael Jackson Song	Order	Mentor's Choice	Result
Olly Murs	Over 25s (Cowell)	1	"Can You Feel It"	5	"We Can Work It Out"	Safe
Joe McElderry	Boys (Cole)	2	"She's Out of My Life"	6	"Open Arms"	Safe (Highest Votes)
Stacey Solomon	Girls (Minogue)	3	"The Way You Make Me Feel"	7	"Somewhere"	Safe
Danyl Johnson	Over 25s (Cowell)	4	"Man in the Mirror"	8	"I Have Nothing"	Eliminated

The semi-final did not feature a final showdown and instead the act with the fewest public votes, Danyl Johnson, was automatically eliminated. After his elimination, Johnson reprised his semi-final performance of "Man in the Mirror" as his exit song.

==== Week 10: Final (12/13 December) ====
12 December

- Themes: Audition songs; celebrity duets; mentor's favourite performance ("song of the series")
- Musical guest: Robbie Williams ("You Know Me")
- Best bits song: "What a Wonderful World"

Acts' performances on the Saturday Final
Act	Category (mentor)	Order	First song	Order	Second song	Duet Partner	Order	Third song	Result
Stacey Solomon	Girls (Minogue)	1	"What a Wonderful World"	4	"Feeling Good"	Michael Bublé	7	"Who Wants to Live Forever"	Eliminated
Olly Murs	Over 25s (Cowell)	2	"Superstition"	5	"Angels"	Robbie Williams	8	"A Fool in Love"	Safe
Joe McElderry	Boys (Cole)	3	"Dance with My Father"	6	"Don't Let the Sun Go Down on Me"	George Michael	9	"Sorry Seems to Be the Hardest Word"	Safe (Highest Votes)

The show also featured Jeff Brazier reporting from Solomon's home town of Dagenham, Michael Underwood in Colchester for Murs and Kimberley Walsh in McElderry's home town of South Shields.

13 December

- Themes: Favourite performance ("song of the series"); winner's single
- Group performance: "Never Forget" (all finalists)
- Musical guests: Alexandra Burke and JLS ("Bad Boys" / "Everybody in Love"), Leona Lewis ("Stop Crying Your Heart Out"), George Michael ("December Song (I Dreamed of Christmas)"), Paul McCartney ("Drive My Car" and "Live and Let Die" )
- Best bits songs: "Red" (Olly Murs) & "The World's Greatest" (Joe McElderry)

Acts' performances on the Sunday Final
Act	Category (mentor)	Order	First song	Order	Second song	Result
Olly Murs	Over 25s (Cowell)	1	"Twist and Shout"	3	"The Climb"	Runner-Up
Joe McElderry	Boys (Cole)	2	"Don't Stop Believin'"	4	"The Climb"	Winner

== Sponsors ==
This series of The X Factor was sponsored by TalkTalk and featured break bumpers pioneered by CHI & Partners, showing light graffiti set against night-time backdrops across the United Kingdom. Part of the deal, which applied to ITV, ITV2 and the programme's website, saw TalkTalk customers having the chance to design the break bumpers and download exclusive content. In the Republic of Ireland, the series was sponsored by Domino's Pizza.

== Reception ==
=== Ratings ===
The first episode, which was broadcast on 22 August and showed the first set of auditions, attracted 9.9 million viewers; 47.9% of the viewing audience and the largest number of viewers within its timeslot. One week later, 9.75 million people viewed the second episode; a 47.1% share of the TV audience. The third episode averaged 11.76 million viewers and a 51.9% audience share. Episode four attracted 10.26 million viewers. The fifth episode, which was scheduled directly against Strictly Come Dancing drew in about 9.27 million viewers, compared to 7.72 for Strictly. The X Factor reached a record high number of viewers for the second and third results shows on 18 and 25 October, scoring 14.8 million viewers each. This was beaten on 8 November when the fifth results show peaked at 16.6 million people.

The final episode peaked with 19.1 million viewers when Joe McElderry was announced as the winner.

Episode	Air date	Official ITV rating	Weekly rank	Share
Auditions 1	22 August	11.00	1	47.9%
Auditions 2	29 August	10.81	1	47.1%
Auditions 3	5 September	12.84	1	51.9%
Auditions 4	12 September	11.31	1	51.7%
Auditions 5	19 September	10.57	2	38.0%
Auditions 6	20 September	11.37	1	41.4%
Bootcamp 1	26 September	10.39	2	36.6%
Bootcamp 2	27 September	11.86	1	42.5%
Judges' houses 1	3 October	11.46	2	38.9%
Judges' houses 2	4 October	13.35	1	44.9%
Live show 1	10 October	12.64	2	43.8%
Results show 1	11 October	13.82	1	46.4%
Live show 2	17 October	12.07	2	42.1%
Results show 2	18 October	13.89	1	46.7%
Live show 3	24 October	12.80	2	44.1%
Results show 3	25 October	14.02	1	47.9%
Live show 4	31 October	11.74	2	42.3%
Results show 4	1 November	14.52	1	47.8%
Live show 5	7 November	13.05	2	46.9%
Results show 5	8 November	15.00	1	49.4%
Live show 6	14 November	13.45	2	45.1%
Results show 6	15 November	15.02	1	47.9%
Live show 7	21 November	14.03	2	48.6%
Results show 7	22 November	14.51	1	46.5%
Live show 8	28 November	13.46	2	47.8%
Results show 8	29 November	14.34	1	45.9%
Live semi-final	5 December	13.40	2	49.5%
Live semi-final results	6 December	13.55	1	46.2%
Final	12 December	13.34	2	48.0%
Winner announces	13 December	16.28	1	53.2%
Series average	2009	13.00	—N/a	45.9%

== Controversies ==
=== Bootcamp ===
On 2 August 2009, The People reported that some bootcamp contestants felt they had been poorly treated by the show's producers; one compared the experience with that of a concentration camp and another claimed that those competing were only allowed to use the toilet twice a day. However, a spokesperson for the programme denied the claims, saying "Yes, it was long hours but they knew what they were signing up for. The hopefuls got breakfast at the hotel and decent food throughout the day".

=== Audition format ===
This season's audition format, in which the auditions were held in front of a studio audience, was criticised by fans, by Cole and by certain former contestants. These included Alexandra Burke, who branded it "too intimidating", and the members of JLS who stated it detracted from the intimacy of the auditions.

=== Recycled contestants ===
The show was criticised in September 2009 for "recycling" contestants, as three singers from the final 24 acts had already been in pop bands, two had auditioned for The X Factor in previous years and one had appeared on Britain's Got Talent.

=== Danyl Johnson ===
Controversy began after the first live show on 10 October, after Minogue commented on press reports regarding Danyl Johnson's sexuality, sparking an online backlash. Minogue released a statement on her comments:

"I want to clear up exactly what happened on last night's X Factor show and post my sincere apologies to anyone who took offense [sic]. I made a comment about Danyl changing the lyrics of his song. It was meant to be a humorous moment about the fact he has an opportunity to have fun with his song. An openly bi-sexual singing a song that is lyrically a 'girl's song'. Danyl and I were joking about the very same thing in rehearsals on Friday, so it carried on to the show. I'd like to apologise to anyone that was offended by my comments, it was never my intention. I spoke to Danyl straight after the show last night and he wasn't offended or upset by my comments, and knew exactly what I was saying."

Minogue also apologised on the live results show on 11 October, saying Danyl was not upset by her comments. It has since been reported that Ofcom received around 4000 complaints from viewers over the comment.
