= Brighton Festival Chorus =

Choir based in Brighton, England

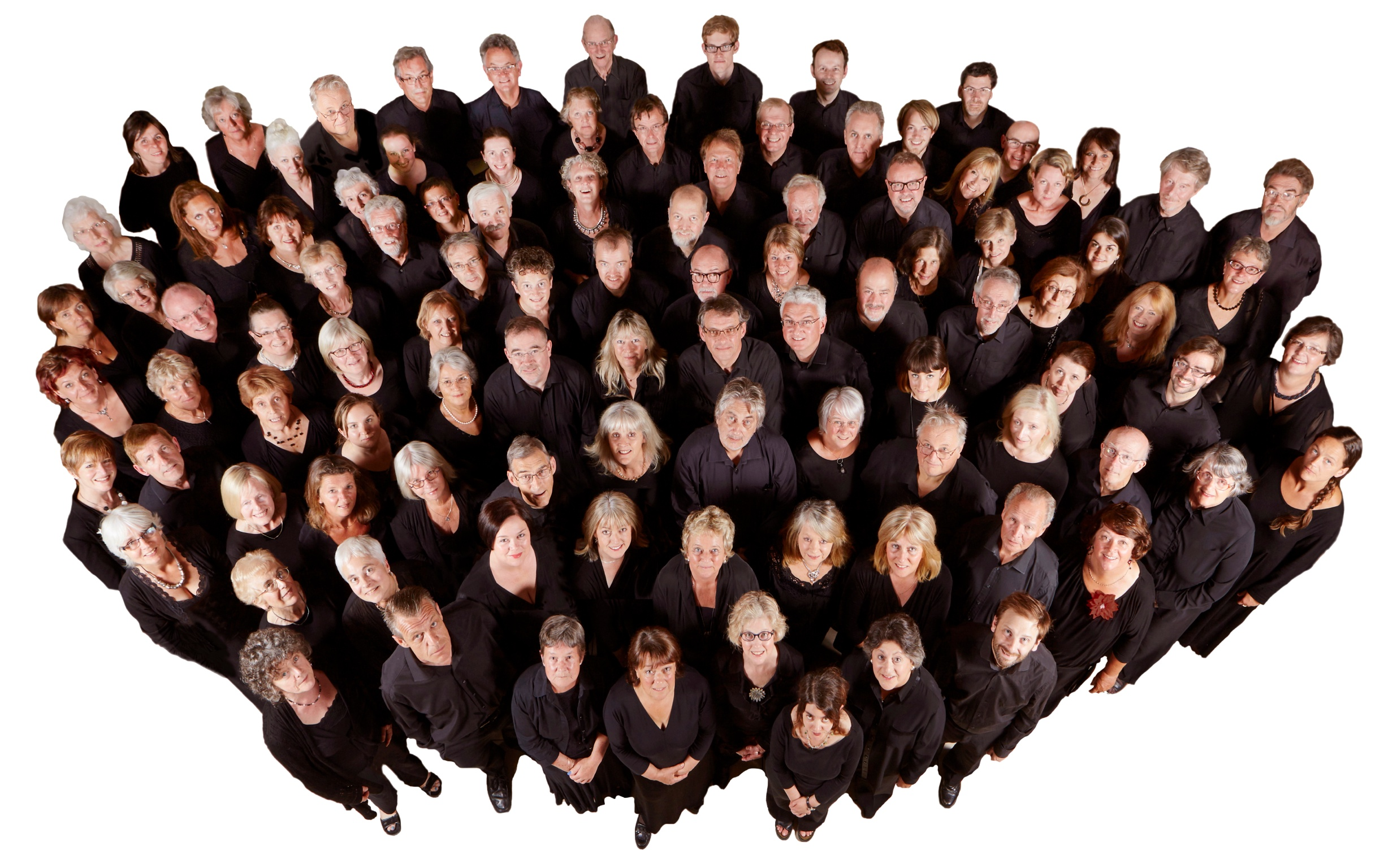
- Members of Brighton Festival Chorus, 2015

Background information
- Also known as: BFC
- Origin: Brighton, United Kingdom
- Genres: Classical
- Years active: 1968–present
- Labels: Chandos; RCA Red Seal; Decca; Telarc; Albany; Vox; EMI
- Website: bfc.org.uk

Brighton Festival Chorus (abbreviated to BFC) is a large choir of over 150 amateur singers based in Brighton, UK. One of the country's leading symphony choruses.., and considered "one of the jewels in the city's musical crown", BFC performs in major concert halls throughout Britain and Europe, particularly in Brighton and London.

BFC performs regularly with all the major British orchestras, including the Royal Philharmonic Orchestra (RPO), BBC Symphony Orchestra (BBCSO), City of Birmingham Symphony Orchestra (CBSO), London Symphony Orchestra (LSO), The Hallé Orchestra and the Philharmonia Orchestra. BFC also has a long-standing relationship with the Brighton Philharmonic Orchestra (BPO).

BFC has also made 10 appearances at the BBC Proms since its first Proms performance in 1986 and two of its many recordings of classical works have been nominated for a Grammy Award.

As of October 2021, the chorus has performed 656 works in 530 concerts and 93 recording sessions at 103 different venues. It has worked with 109 orchestras, 160 conductors, 743 soloists and 114 other choirs.

== History ==
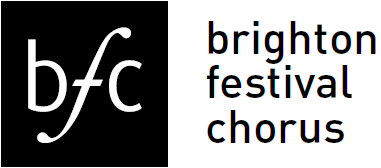
Official logo of Brighton Festival Chorus

=== Formation and Early Years (1968–1979) ===
BFC was formed by the Hungarian-born conductor László Heltay for the 1968 Brighton Festival specifically for a performance of Sir William Walton's large-scale cantata Belshazzar's Feast, conducted by the composer with the RPO at the Brighton Dome. The performance was a huge success and launched Brighton Festival Chorus as an important part of the music scene in Britain and, under László Heltay's directorship, one of the most successful choirs in the country, as well as becoming a "symbol of the festival". In the same year the chorus performed Mozart's Kyrie in D Minor (conducted by Sir Colin Davis with the BBCSO) and Kodály's Budavari Te Deum (conducted by László Heltay with the BPO).

Building on this success, BFC performed three more concerts in Brighton in 1969, and in 1970 made its first recording: Kodály's Psalmus Hungaricus with the LSO conducted by István Kertész.

In 1972, BFC performed its first concerts outside Brighton, when it took part (as the English Bach Festival Chorus) in a series of concerts for the English Bach Festival (EBF). The first of these concerts, Stravinsky's Symphony of Psalms with the LSO conducted by Leonard Bernstein, marked BFC's first performance at the Royal Albert Hall. This work was recorded, with the same forces, 2 days later at Abbey Road Studios. Three more concerts were performed by BFC for the EBF that year in Oxford and London.

The following year saw a marked upturn in the number of BFC's engagements to perform, with 4 concerts in Brighton and Hove, 2 concerts in London, a recording of Janáček's Glagolitic Mass and the chorus's first concert abroad: Beethoven's 9th Symphony at the Coliseu dos Recreios in Lisbon, Portugal.

In 1975, BFC's recording of Janáček's Glagolitic Mass with the RPO under Rudolf Kempe was nominated for a Grammy Award in the "Best Classical Performance – Choral" category.

In 1976 the chorus began a long association with the conductor Antal Doráti, under whose baton the chorus performed in 18 concerts, mostly in the Royal Festival Hall, and made 5 recordings.

=== The 1980s ===
The 1980s saw a marked upturn in BFC's concert and recording schedule. Overall, the decade saw BFC perform in 139 concerts (24 in 1988 alone – BFC's busiest year to date) and make 8 recordings.

During the 1984 Brighton Festival, BFC performed the British premier of Penderecki's Te Deum, conducted by the composer, the performance being considered the musical high point of the Festival.

In 1985, BFC began a series of engagements with the RPO under André Previn, including two performances of Ravel's Daphnis et Chloé in that year; a performance and recording of Walton's Belshazzar's Feast and two performances and a recording of Tippett's A Child of Our Time in 1986; two further performances of Daphnis et Chloé in 1987; Brahms's German Requiem in 1988; and Beethoven's 9th Symphony in 1989. A recording of Tippet's A Child of Our Time with the RPO under André Previn saw BFC receive its 2nd Grammy nomination in the "Best Choral Performance" category

In 1986, BFC performed for the first time at the BBC Proms, performing Walton's Belshazzar's Feast with the RPO under Vernon Handley. The following year, BFC took part in two promenade concerts, performing Schoenberg's Gurre-Lieder with the National Youth Orchestra of Great Britain under Pierre Boulez and Ravel's Daphnis et Chloé with the RPO under André Previn.

As well as an increase overall in concert and recording engagements, the decade also saw a significant increase in demand for BFC's services from overseas. The chorus undertook tours of Greece (1981), France (1985 and 1987), Spain (1988) The Netherlands (1988) and Belgium (1988) during the decade.

=== The 1990s ===
BFC continued to be in demand with major orchestras in the UK and Europe during the 1990s, working under the baton of such conductors as Yehudi Menuhin (who became honorary President of the Chorus), Vladimir Ashkenazy, Richard Hickox and Mark Elder, who became honorary President of the Chorus following the death of Yehudi Menuhin in 1999.

BFC performed in 5 BBC Proms concerts during the 1990s:

- Britten's War Requiem with the RPO under Kurt Masur in 1990
- Beethoven's 9th Symphony with the London Philharmonic Orchestra under Klaus Tennstedt in 1991
- Vaughan Williams' A Sea Symphony with the RPO under Vernon Handley in 1992
- Beethoven's 9th Symphony with the Berlin Radio Symphony Orchestra under Vladimir Ashkenazy in 1992
- Mahler's 2nd Symphony with the BBC Philharmonic Orchestra and the Edinburgh Festival Chorus under Charles Mackerras in 1995

The decade also saw the Chorus perform in France, the Netherlands, Belgium and Germany.

In 1992 the Chorus performed for the first time at Leeds Castle under Carl Davis. This became an annual summer engagement for the Chorus which continued until 2007.

In 1996, László Heltay retired as music director of the Chorus. He was succeeded by his deputy, Jonathan Grieves-Smith and then, upon the latter's departure to Australia, by James Morgan, who holds the position of music director to the present day. Grieves-Smith was subsequently extradited from Australia, and found guilty of multiple sexual offences, receiving a gaol term of 24 years. László Heltay held the honorary title of Conductor Emeritus of BFC until his death in 2019.

=== Recent Years ===
The Chorus continues to be much in demand, and still performs regularly in Brighton, London and further afield.

In 2005, BFC took part in the world premier of the concert version of Tavener's The Veil of the Temple at the BBC Proms, and in 2011 BFC joined forces with the BBC Concert Orchestra, the BBC National Orchestra of Wales and 9 other choirs for a BBC Proms performance of Havergal Brian's monumental Symphony No. 1 "The Gothic" under the baton of Martyn Brabbins.

In response to the downturn in the market for live choral music following the 2007/8 financial crisis, the Chorus began to develop its own series of small- and large-scale concerts in the Brighton and Hove area, putting on and promoting concerts with works ranging from Rachmaninov's Vespers to semi-staged performances of Bach's St John Passion.

Since 2009, BFC has been a regular participant in the "BBC Big Sing" from the Royal Albert Hall, at which special editions of the BBC's Songs of Praise programme are recorded.

In 2011 BFC joined Orchestre de Picardie and 11 other partners from across southern England and northern France to take part in "ACT – A Common Territory". This programme of events, supported financially by the European Regional Development Fund as part of its Interreg programme, ran from 2011 to 2015, and saw the Chorus join forces with the Orchestre de Picardie, Orchestre de Bretagne and soloists from the Royal Opera's Jette Parker Young Artists Programme under the direction of Arie van Beek to perform Verdi's Requiem in Amiens, Compiègne and Rennes in December 2013. Also as part of the ACT Network, BFC performed Beethoven's 9th Symphony in Rouen in January 2014. Two further ACT Network performances of Verdi's Requiem followed in July 2014, when BFC was joined by the Royal Opera House Thurrock Community Chorus in Purfleet, Essex.

BFC's 500th concert performance, on Good Friday 2015, was a semi-staged "in the round" performance of Bach's St. John Passion at the Brighton Dome, with the Chorus singing the whole work from memory.

In 2015, as part of the celebrations to mark the 800th anniversary of the signing of Magna Carta, BFC commissioned a work from Morgan Pochin on the theme of Liberty. The resulting work "Invictus – Cantata for Liberty" for orchestra, adult choir, youth choir and narrators was premiered at the Brighton Dome in June, and saw BFC join forces with the City of London Sinfonia, Brighton Festival Youth Choir and the Brighton and Hove Community Youth Choir, conducted by James Morgan.

In the 2016 Brighton Festival, the Chorus performed Elgar's Dream of Gerontius "off book", memorising the whole piece and performing it without scores. The concert was judged one of the highlights of that year's festival.

== Brighton Festival Youth Choir ==
In 2002, BFC formed the Brighton Festival Youth Choir (BFYC) to give local schoolchildren the chance to perform choral music to a high standard. BFYC's first music director was Juliette Pochin and their first performance was a live performance on BBC Radio 3, and since then the choir has been in great demand. It has worked with acclaimed ensembles such as the RPO, LPO and Brodsky Quartet under such conductors as Richard Hickox, Jacques Mercier and James Morgan.

Originally run and managed by the BFC, BFYC is now an independent choir and a separate registered charity, although it continues to receive both financial support and concert engagements from BFC.

In January 2016, James Bingham took over from Esther Jones as the new music director of BFYC. The current musical director is Juliette Pochin.

== Repertoire ==
BFC's repertoire includes all of the major choral works from the 18th to the 21st century. Notable works performed by the Chorus have included:

- Walton: Belshazzar's Feast
- Verdi: Requiem
- Orff: Carmina Burana
- Janáček: Glagolitic Mass
- Bach: St John Passion
- Mozart: Requiem and C Minor Mass
- Berlioz: Grande Messe des morts and La damnation de Faust
- Mahler: Symphony No. 2 and Symphony No. 8
- Tavener: The Veil of the Temple
- Britten: War Requiem
- Elgar: The Dream of Gerontius
- Adams: Harmonium
- Vaughan Williams: A Sea Symphony

== Recordings ==
The chorus has made many recordings including Grammy-nominated performances of Janáček's Glagolitic Mass and Tippett's A Child of Our Time. BFC's recording of Debussy's Le Martyre de saint Sébastien with Jacques Mercier and Orchestre national d'Île-de-France was awarded "Le Choc" by the French magazine Le Monde de la musique.

In addition to its recordings of the traditional choral repertoire, BFC has recorded backing tracks for a number of popular recording artists. BFC provided choral backing on Alfie Boe's platinum-certified album Bring Him Home, Joe McElderry's gold-certified albums Classic and Classic Christmas and Collabro's silver-certified album Act Two.

In 2017 the Chorus provided choral backing on the album Vera Lynn 100, a celebration of the 100th birthday of Dame Vera Lynn.

=== Selected Discography – Classical ===
Composer	Work(s)	Orchestra	Conductor	Soloists	Label	Review
Arnold Bax	Enchanted Summer; Fatherland; Walsinghame	Royal Philharmonic Orchestra	Vernon Handley	Lynore McWhirter; Anne Williams-King; Martyn Hill	Chandos CHAN8625	"Excellent solo and choral contributions"
Ludwig van Beethoven	Symphony No. 9 "Choral"	Royal Philharmonic Orchestra	Yehudi Menuhin	Ruth Falcon; Kathleen McKellar-Ferguson; Richard Margison; Thomas Thomaschke	RPO Pickwick CDRPO7001	"...a dedicated, full-throated choir"
Ludwig van Beethoven	Symphony No. 9 "Choral"	Royal Philharmonic Orchestra	Antal Doráti	Carole Farley; Alfreda Hodgson; Stuart Burrows; Norman Bailey	DG Privilege 2726073	"...an exceptionally refreshing performance..."
Havergal Brian	Symphony No. 1 "The Gothic"	BBC Concert Orchestra; BBC National Orchestra of Wales	Martyn Brabbins	Susan Gritton; Christine Rice; Peter Auty; Alastair Miles	Hyperion CDA67971/2	"Hyperion's release is a perfect one, of a great event, a magisterial work and an encapsulation of the enormous difficulties of the project as a whole"; "this recording of The Gothic is very good indeed – the best yet"
Havergal Brian	Psalm 23	Leicestershire Schools Symphony Orchestra	László Heltay		Heritage HTGCD256/7	"Heltay captures the spirit of the work and the orchestra and choir clearly understand and enjoy its idiom"
Claude Debussy	Le Martyre de saint Sébastien	Orchestre national d'Île-de-France	Jacques Mercier	Gaële Le Roi; Françoise Martinaud; Elsa Maurus; Jean-Claude Drouot	RCA Red Seal 7432194788	
Eivind Groven	Draumkvædet	Royal Philharmonic Orchestra	Per Dreier	Toril Carlsen; Kåre Bjørkøy; Asbjørn Hansli	Philips/Impetus 6529139	"The performance ... is sympathetic, and the recording eminently well balanced"
Joseph Haydn	Il Ritorno di Tobia	Royal Philharmonic Orchestra	Antal Doráti	Barbara Hendricks; Linda Zoghby; Della Jones; Philip Langridge; Benjamin Luxon	Decca D216D4	"Most of the choruses are better sung than on the [Szekeres] disc"
Joseph Haydn	The Creation	Royal Philharmonic Orchestra	Antal Doráti	Helena Döse; Lucia Popp; Werner Hollweg; Benjamin Luxon; Kurt Moll	Decca 443027-2	"The Brighton Festival Chorus does well and the sopranos are clear and precise on their high notes"
Joseph Haydn	The Seasons	Royal Philharmonic Orchestra	Antal Doráti	Ileana Cotrubas; Werner Krenn; Hans Sotin	Decca 448101-2	"The chorus sounds fresh and on its toes"; "[The] Decca recording under Dorati also has much to commend it with the Brighton Festival Chorus sonorous and incisive"
Gustav Holst	The Planets	Royal Philharmonic Orchestra	André Previn		Telarc/Conifer DG10133	"The women of Brighton Festival Chorus sing marvellously in tune and sound effectively disembodied as they recede from hearing"
Zoltán Kodály	Hymn of Zrinyi; Psalm 114; Laudes organi		László Heltay	Benjamin Luxon; Gillian Weir	Decca SXL6878	"Heltay has been astonishingly successful in inspiring ... his fresh-toned choir to the fervour and sensitivity they show"
Zoltán Kodály	Missa Brevis; Pange Lingua		László Heltay	Elizabeth Gale; Sally Le Sage; Hannah Francis; Alfreda Hodgson; Ian Caley; Michael Rippon; Christopher Bowers-Broadbent	Decca SXL6803	"The Brighton Festival Chorus is, without reservation, first-rate throughout"
Zoltán Kodály	Psalmus Hungaricus	London Symphony Orchestra	István Kertész; László Heltay	Lajos Kozma	Decca 421810-2	"...invigorating performance..."; "...brilliantly done..."
George Lloyd	A Symphonic Mass	Bournemouth Symphony Orchestra	George Lloyd		Albany Records TROY100	" Listening to it in the composer's electrically intense performance, so realistically reproduced, is a very moving experience."
Gustav Mahler	Symphony No. 2 "Resurrection"	Royal Philharmonic Orchestra	Harold Farberman	Felicity Lott; Helen Watts	Vox 27213	
Frank Martin	In Terra Pax	London Philharmonic Orchestra	Matthias Bamert	Judith Howarth; Della Jones; Martyn Hill; Stephen Roberts; Roderick Williams	Chandos CHAN9465	"Matthias Bamert has now put us in his debt with his impressive ongoing survey of Martin's output, to which this disc is a distinguished addition"
John Blackwood McEwen	Hymn on the Morning of Christ's Nativity	London Philharmonic Orchestra	Alasdair Mitchell	Janice Watson	Chandos CHAN9669	"Chorus and orchestra work with conviction"
Carl Orff	Carmina Burana	Royal Philharmonic Orchestra	Antal Doráti	Norma Burrowes; Louis Devos; John Shirley-Quirk	Decca 444105	"a curious lack of co-ordination between singers and orchestra"
Paul Patterson	Mass of the Sea	Royal Philharmonic Orchestra	Geoffrey Simon	Ann Mackay; Christopher Keyte	RPO8006	"The impact of the work is tellingly brought home thanks to warmly committed playing and singing under Geoffrey Simon's direction"; "This 1987 recording... captures the atmosphere of the work admirably"
Dmitri Shostakovich	Symphony No. 2 "To October"; Song of the Forests	Royal Philharmonic Orchestra	Vladimir Ashkenazy	Mikhail Kotliarov; Nikita Storozhev	Decca 436762-2DH	
Igor Stravinsky	Symphony of Psalms	London Symphony Orchestra	Leonard Bernstein		Royal Edition SMK47628	"the superiority of the ... Chorus is plain"
Michael Tippett	A Child of Our Time	Royal Philharmonic Orchestra	André Previn	Sheila Armstrong; Felicity Palmer; Philip Langridge; John Shirley-Quirk	Carlton 30367-02052	"This is an excellent performance..."
Giuseppe Verdi	Requiem	Royal Philharmonic Orchestra	Owain Arwel Hughes	Elizabeth Connell; Ameral Gunson; Edmund Barham; John Tomlinson	EMI Eminence EMXD2503	"Owain Arwel Hughes leads an accomplished, warmly felt performance"
William Walton	Belshazzar's Feast	Royal Philharmonic Orchestra	André Previn	Benjamin Luxon	Carlton 30367-01862	"...the choral singing here too is white-hot"

=== Selected Discography – Other ===
Artist	Album	Label
Alfie Boe	Bring Him Home	Decca
Collabro	Act Two	Sony Music 88875064862
Joe McElderry	Classic	UCJ Music 2779934
Vera Lynn	Vera Lynn 100	Decca 5737270

== 50th Anniversary ==
2018 is the 50th anniversary of the Chorus's formation. The Chorus is planning a special season of concerts and events to celebrate this milestone, including performances at the Brighton Festival and in London, as well as a tour of France in November 2018 where the Chorus will be taking part in three performances of Britten's War Requiem to mark the Centenary of the signing of the Armistice.

== Organisation and Governance ==
BFC is a charity registered in England (charity number 1173302), and is governed by a committee of Trustees elected by the members of the Chorus. The trustees are responsible for the day-to-day running of the Chorus. The music director, while not a Trustee of the Chorus, is regularly consulted on and informed of the Trustees' decisions, and has the final say in all matters relating to the musical direction of the Chorus.
