= Spanton =

Spanton is a surname. Notable people with the surname include:

- Helen Margaret Spanton (1877–1934), British artist and suffragette
- Mabel Mary Spanton (1874–c.1940), British artist
- Tim Spanton (born 1957), British journalist
- William Spanton
- William Silas Spanton (1845–1930), British artist, art historian and photographer
