= Juliette Pochin =

Welsh classical musician

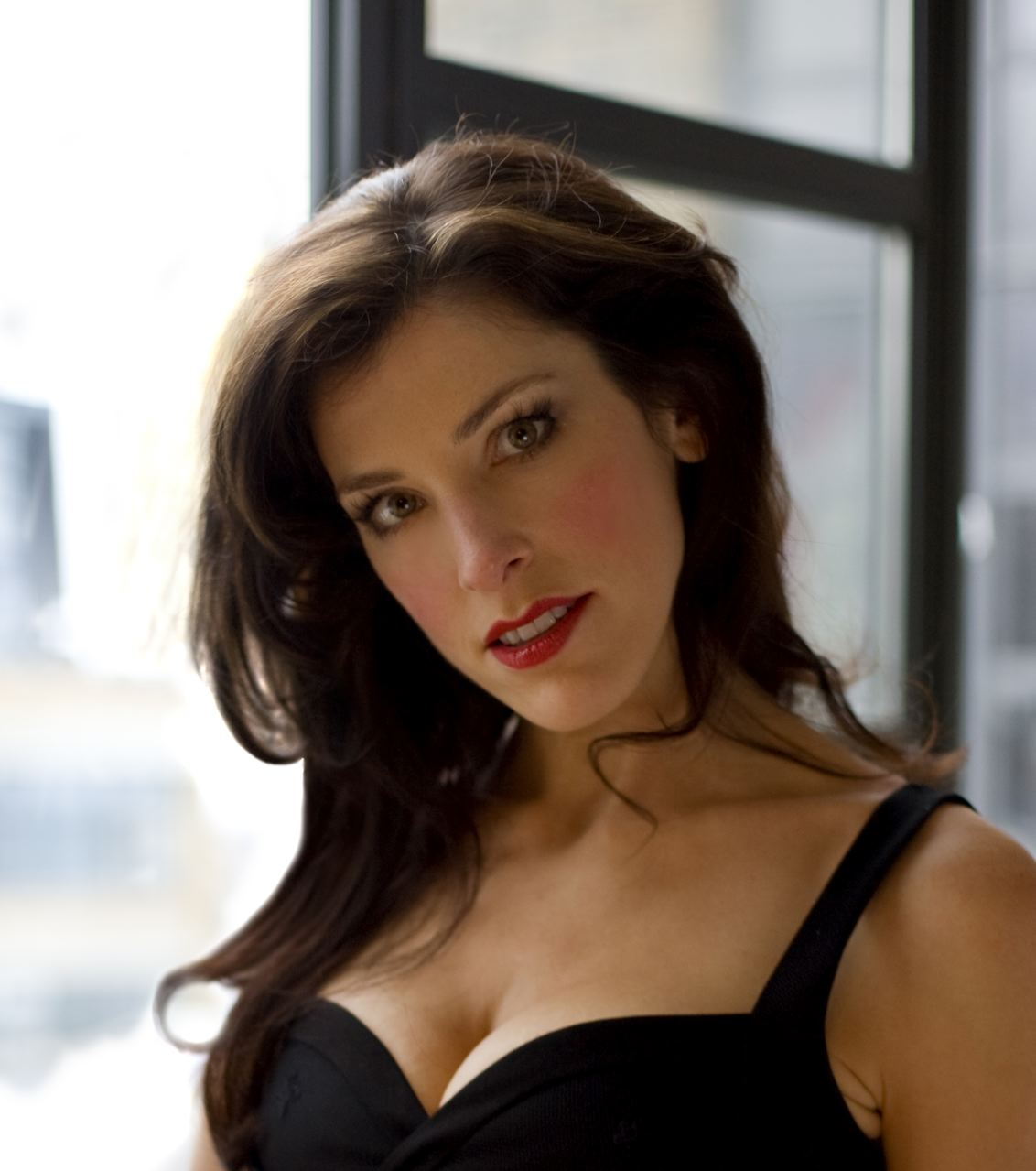
Juliette Pochin

Juliette Pochin is a Welsh classically trained mezzo-soprano singer, composer/arranger, and record producer. She is known not only for her performances in operas and as a classical recitalist but also for her recordings of operatically styled crossover music. Morgan Pochin Music Productions Ltd, the company she formed with her husband James Morgan, is known for its record productions for artists such as Katherine Jenkins and Alfie Boe, as well as its arrangements for film and television scores.

== Biography ==
Born in Haverfordwest, Pochin attended the Royal Academy of Music (Junior Academy). She went on to read music at Trinity College, Cambridge as a choral scholar and also trained at the Guildhall School of Music and Drama. In 2005 she was signed by Sony BMG to record her debut album, Venezia. Released in 2006, it was a Classic FM Record of the Week. Five months after the album's release, the British-owned chocolatiers Hotel Chocolat introduced a new chocolate range named for her, inspired by a description of her voice in The Times as "sounding like melted chocolate". She was the soloist for three years at the televised BBC Proms in the Park from Salford.

Pochin is married to the conductor and composer James Morgan. The couple met at Cambridge University and first worked together composing for the Footlights. They went on to form Morgan Pochin Music Productions Ltd.

She is a regular orchestrator and musical director for BBC Radio 2's Piano Room.

Pochin's setting of Lemn Sissay's poem, "Let There Be Peace", composed for the Brighton Festival, received its first live performance at Cadogan Hall in 2023.

Pochin wrote her first musical cabaret show, Music, Mayhem and a Mezzo, during the COVID-19 lockdown, and is now a regular performer at The Crazy Coqs, The Pheasantry and the Edinburgh Festival Fringe, where she was Pick of the Fringe.

== Morgan Pochin Music Productions ==
Morgan Pochin Music Productions was founded by Pochin and her husband James Morgan to produce recordings, as well as compose original works for film and the concert platform.

Record production

They have produced numerous albums which have reached the Top 10 in the UK charts, including: Luke Evans' A Song for You, which reached no. 4, three studio albums for Alfie Boe, Joe McElderry's second studio album, Classic, which reached no. 2, and Vera Lynn 100, which peaked at no. 3 for Vera Lynn.

Their album with the Poor Clares of Arundel, Light for the World, debuted at no. 1 in the UK Classical music chart in October 2020, a position it retained for 19 weeks. It reached no. 5 in the main UK album chart.

As Piano Hands, their piano duo, they released two albums for Rhino Records (Warner Music), and can be regularly heard on Classic FM and Scala Radio.

Film and TV

In 2010, Morgan Pochin adapted Mozart's music into a modern film score for the British film 1st Night, based on his opera Così fan tutte, starring Richard E. Grant and Sarah Brightman. The film soundtrack album, arranged and produced by Morgan Pochin, was released on the Sony label in October 2011.

In 2012, Morgan Pochin produced the music for Dustin Hoffman's first film as a director, Quartet, starring Maggie Smith, Billy Connolly, Tom Courtenay and Michael Gambon.

Morgan Pochin have also provided music for films including Operation Mincemeat, The Courier, and the television film Killing Jesus.

They have composed and arranged music for several television shows, including The Kumars at No. 42.

Compositions

Morgan Pochin were commissioned by the Brighton Festival to compose "The Great Enormo – a Kerfuffle in B flat for orchestra, soprano and wasps", with words by Michael Rosen. It premiered with Rosen as narrator, Morgan as conductor, Pochin as soprano and the City of London Sinfonia. It has since been performed by the City of Birmingham Symphony Orchestra at the Birmingham Symphony Hall, the Southbank Centre (Imagine Festival) and it has been translated into Portuguese for performances in Porto.

Their choral cantata Invictus was commissioned by Brighton Festival Chorus and performed by the City of London Sinfonia, Brighton Festival Chorus and Youth Choir, and massed children's choirs, and premiered at the Brighton Dome in 2015 to mark the 800th anniversary of the Magna Carta.

Their choral composition "Kubla Khan" had its world premiere at the 2002 Brighton Festival.

Charity work

In conjunction with Parkinson's UK, Morgan Pochin arranged two gala fundraising concerts, Symfunny 1 and Symfunny 2, at London's Royal Albert Hall, for which they were both awarded a Points of Light Award at 10 Downing Street from then Prime Minister Theresa May.

== Recordings ==
=== As performer ===
- Venezia (selections from Vivaldi's sonnets sung to the music of his The Four Seasons) (Sony/BMG)
- The Sky Shall Be Our Roof (rare songs from the operas of Ralph Vaughan Williams) – Sarah Fox (soprano), Juliette Pochin (mezzo-soprano), Andrew Staples (tenor), Roderick Williams (baritone), Iain Burnside (piano) (Albion Records)
- Poetry Serenade (English poems set by composer Brian Knowles) – Jon Christos (tenor), Nick Garrett (bass-baritone), Juliette Pochin (mezzo-soprano), Elin Manahan Thomas (soprano); City of Prague Philharmonic Orchestra, James Morgan (conductor) (Signum Records)

=== Morgan Pochin discography ===
- A Song For You – Luke Evans (BMG)
- Alfie – Alfie Boe (Decca)
- Premiere – Katherine Jenkins (UCJ)
- Bring Him Home – Alfie Boe (Decca)
- Vera Lynn 100 – Vera Lynn (Decca)
- Classic – Joe McElderry (Decca)
- Classic Christmas – Joe McElderry (Decca)
- Someone To Watch Over Me – Ella Fitzgerald and the London Symphony Orchestra (Verve)
- Act Two – Collabro (Syco)
- Songs Without Words (Universal/Classic FM)
- Rise Up – Cliff Richard (Rhino)
- Light for The World – Poor Clare Sisters of Arundel (Decca)
- Classic Rock (Decca)
- Serenata – Alfie Boe (Decca)
- Venezia – Juliette Pochin (Sony)
- Home – Collabro (Peak Productions)
- Love Like This – Collabro (BMG)
- Symphonies Meines Leben I, II – Howard Carpendale (Electrola)
- Happy Christmas – Howard Carpendale (Electrola)
- Christmas is Here – Collabro (Peak Productions)
- Sleep Baby Sleep – Royal Philharmonic Orchestra (Classic FM)
- Swimming Over London – The King's Singers (Signum)
