= WCE =

WCE can stand for:

- West Coast Eagles, an Australian Football League team
- West Coast Express, a commuter rail service out of Vancouver, British Columbia, Canada
- West Coast Expressway, an interstate expressway spanning across the west coast of Peninsular Malaysia.
- Windows CE, an embedded version of Microsoft Windows
- Winnipeg Commodity Exchange, a derivatives market based in Winnipeg, Canada
- Capsule Endoscopy, a medical procedure involving swallowing a capsule with remote imaging capabilities
- World Challenge Expeditions, a British expedition organising company
- Wiener Chaos Expansion, another name for Polynomial chaos
