= Churcher's College =

Location
- Ramshill; Petersfield & Liphook, Hampshire, GU31 4AS; United Kingdom; 51.009°N 0.928°W

Information
- Type: Private day school
- Motto: Credita Caelo (trust in heaven)
- Established: 1722; 304 years ago
- Founder: Richard Churcher
- Local authority: Hampshire
- Department for Education URN: 116579 Tables
- Chairman of the Governors: Michael Gallagher (retired 2023)
- Headmaster: Will Scott
- Gender: Co-educational
- Age: 3 to 18
- Enrolment: 1185
- Houses: Collingwood; Drake; Grenville; Nelson; Rodney
- Alumni: Old Churcherians
- Website: www.churcherscollege.com

Churcher's College is a private co-educational fee-charging day school, founded in 1722. Churcher’s College has been regarded as a leading private school in the south of England. The senior school (ages 11–18) is in the market town of Petersfield, Hampshire, and the junior school and nursery (ages 3–11) are in nearby Liphook. It is a member of the Headmasters' and Headmistresses' Conference (HMC).

The College was founded in Petersfield in the 1720s by the will of Richard Churcher to educate local boys in the skills needed for service in the East India Company.

The headmaster is Will Scott, who replaced Simon Williams at the end of the 2025-2026 academic year.

== History ==
The school was founded under the will of Richard Churcher in 1722. Churcher was a wealthy local philanthropist who had made his fortune through interests in the British East India Company. His will, dated 1722, decreed that the College was to educate:

10 or 12 local boys from Petersfield, of any age from 9 to 14, in the arts of writing, arithmetic, mathematics and navigation so they could be apprenticed to masters of ships sailing in the East Indies.

Under the terms of the will, Churcher's College was created from a £3,000 gift as a non-denominational foundation, a status it has kept to this day. The original school, built in 1729, is in College Street and is a Grade II* listed building. The school became increasingly popular due to its successes, and in 1881 moved to its present location in Ramshill, accommodating 150 boys, on land donated by the J&W Nicholson & Co family of gin makers.

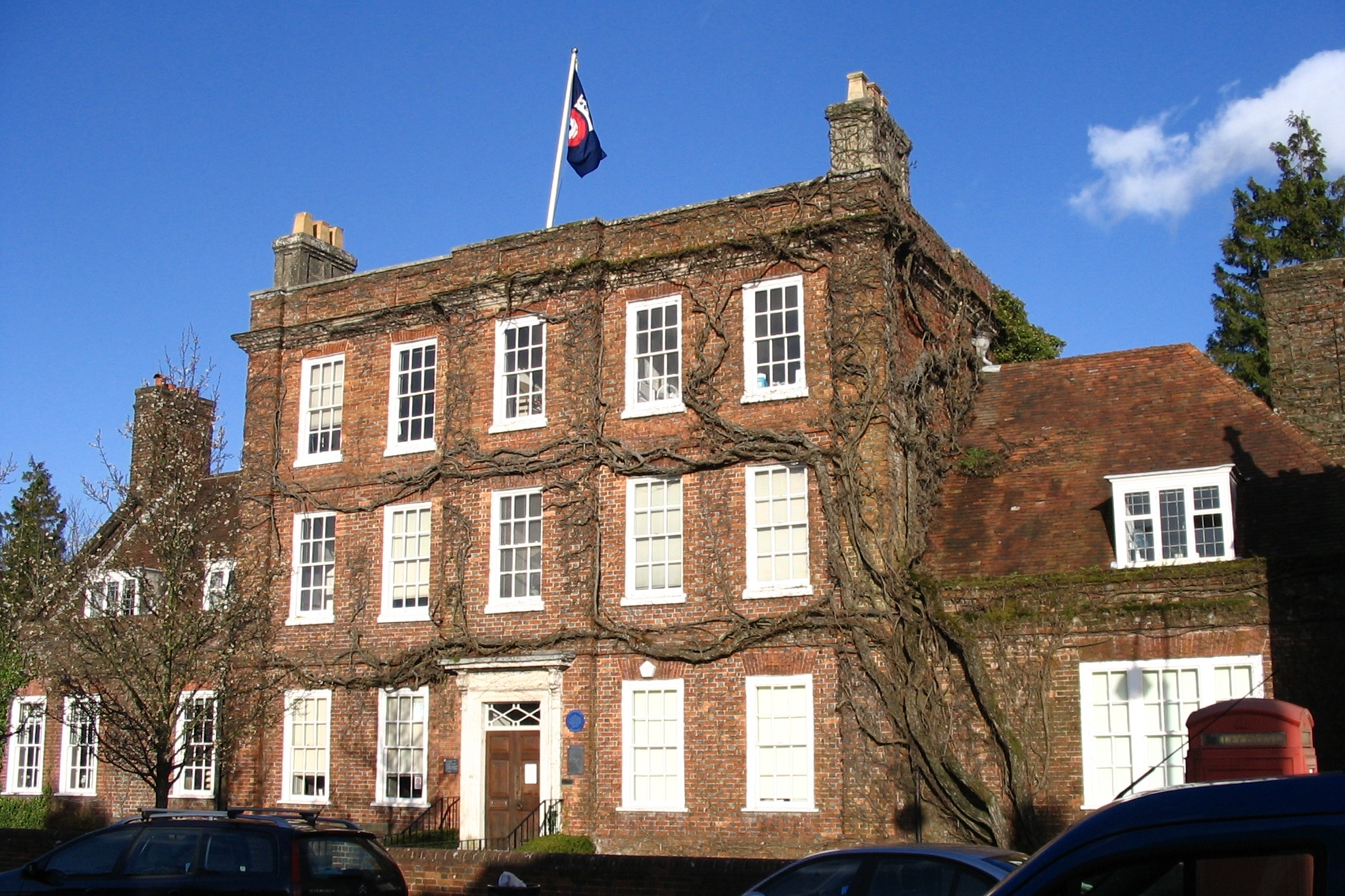
Original College building, College Street

From 1946 to 1964 Broadlands, opposite the college grounds in Ramshill, was the preparatory school for Churcher's. It was Grade II listed in 1949.

For much of the 20th century Churcher's College operated as a voluntary aided grammar school. In 1979, Hampshire County Council decided to cease to maintain the college, which became an independent fee-paying school. The school's expanding population (by the mid-20th century the school educated some 400 boys, of whom about a quarter boarded in three separate houses: Mount House, Ramshill House and School house) has necessitated the addition of a number of modern buildings alongside the original 1881 buildings.

Girls were first admitted to the Sixth Form in 1980, and the school became fully co-educational in 1988.

In 1993 the school purchased Moreton House School in Petersfield, which became Churcher's College Junior School. Following an unsuccessful attempt to relocate in Petersfield, the school eventually purchased an existing school campus in Liphook (Littlefield's School), which from 2003 became the junior school's new site.

== Head ==
Simon Williams has been headmaster since 2004, having succeeded Geoffrey Buttle. He is retiring in 2026 and his successor will be Will Scott.

== Sport and outdoor pursuits ==
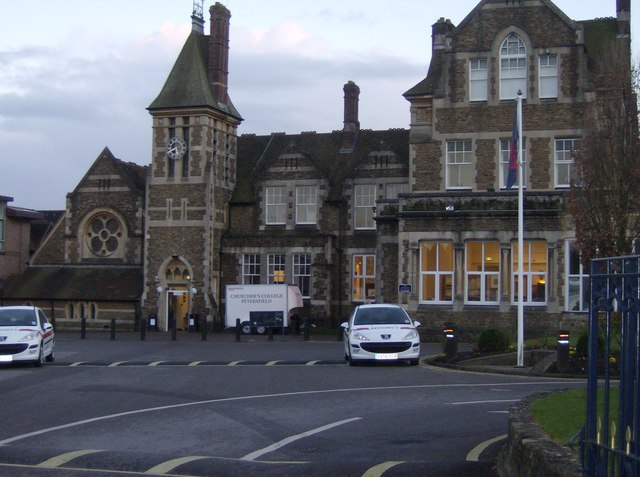
Front elevation of Churcher's College, 2007

Pupils at the school play rugby, hockey, netball and cricket. The College was the first school to affiliate to the Hampshire RFU in 1924. OC Frank Guy was responsible for the founding of local rugby union club Petersfield R.F.C. in 1927. In 2015, Churcher's won the NatWest Schools Cup under-18 Vase with 13-5 victory over SEEVIC College, the first Hampshire school to do so.

The school has equestrianism, tennis, hockey, rugby, swimming, athletics and recently football teams and events and competes in contests such as the Ten Tors, and Ten peaks (a churcher’s college made event, due to unselection in 2023) Churcher’s College won Ten Tors in both 2014 and 2015, the Devizes to Westminster International Canoe Marathon, and the Charlton Chase and annually sponsor/host the Butser Hill Challenge events.

There are Combined Cadet Force and Duke of Edinburgh Award programmes, as well as the World Challenge and First Challenge expeditions for the 4th and 5th and 6th form students.

== Notable alumni ==
- Michael Auger (born 1990), member of the band Collabro which took the top prize in the TV show Britain’s Got Talent, 2014
- Brig Henry Baxter CBE GM (1921-2007), Commander of the Ulster Defence Regiment 1973–6; awarded the George Medal 1957 for removing an IRA bomb in Armagh
- Charles Beeson (1957–2021), TV director
- Dr Geoffrey Boxshall FRS (born 1950), Natural History Museum 1974 to date
- Rhidian Brook (born 1964), writer and broadcaster
- Arthur Brough (1905-1978), actor (Are You Being Served?)
- Jack Campbell (born 1999), cricketer
- Rt Rev Harry Carpenter (1901-1993), Bishop of Oxford 1955–70
- Calum Chambers (born 1995), footballer for Cardiff City F.C. and England
- Harry Charles (born 1999), Olympian
- Howard Drake OBE (born 1956), High Commissioner to Jamaica from 2010 to 2013, and Ambassador to Chile from 2005 to 2009
- Sir Jeremy Farrar (born 1961), Professor of Tropical Medicine, University of Oxford and Director of the Wellcome Trust
- Tim Footman (born 1968), writer and quiz show regular
- Reg Gammon (1894-1997), artist
- Mark Goldring (born 1957), charity executive
- Jim Hetherington (born 1932), former England rugby union player
- Simon Ings (born 1965), writer
- Edward Kelsey (1930-2019), actor (The Archers – Joe Grundy, DangerMouse)
- Alex Lawther (born 1995), actor (The Imitation Game, The End of the F***ing World)
- Stuart Piggott (1910–1996), archaeologist
- Fiona Pocock (born 1989), rugby union player for England
- Barrie Roberts (1939–2007), author, folk singer, freelance journalist and criminal lawyer
- Tim Rodber (born 1969), former England rugby union player
- Tiny Rowland (1917–1998), businessman and chairman of the Lonrho conglomerate 1962–1993
- Christopher Snow (born 1958), Royal Navy officer
- Tim Spanton (born 1957), journalist
- Robert Tronson (1924-2008), TV and film director, including police dramas and The Darling Buds of May
