= William Silas Spanton =

English painter

William Silas Spanton, by Helen Margaret Spanton, (1927)

William Silas Spanton (1845 – 27 December 1930) was a British artist, art historian and photographer based in Bury St Edmunds in Suffolk.

Born at 42 Abbeygate Street in Bury St Edmunds in Suffolk in 1845, the son of William Spanton (1822–1870) and his wife Sarah née King (1820–1909). William Spanton Snr had established his 'Repository of Arts and West Suffolk Photographic Establishment' at 16 Abbeygate Street in Bury St Edmunds by 1864. His son William Silas Spanton studied painting at the Royal Academy of Arts in London where he was sponsored by Sir Edwin Landseer, exhibiting there in 1867 and 1868. When his father died suddenly in 1870 aged just 47 he was forced to abandon his studies to return to his native town to support his mother and siblings by taking over the family business as a photographer, carver, gilder and artist. He developed the business by introducing picture framing and glazing along with the sale of art supplies while also making a successful sideline as an optician. In 1876 in Bury St Edmunds he married Sarah née Pechey (1847–1917), the sister of the Bury St Edmunds printer Elisha Pechey. With his wife he had three children: the artist and suffragette Helen Margaret Spanton (1877–1934); Dorothy Spanton (1879–1925) and Arthur Pechey Spanton (1880–1916), who was killed in the Battle of the Somme during World War I.

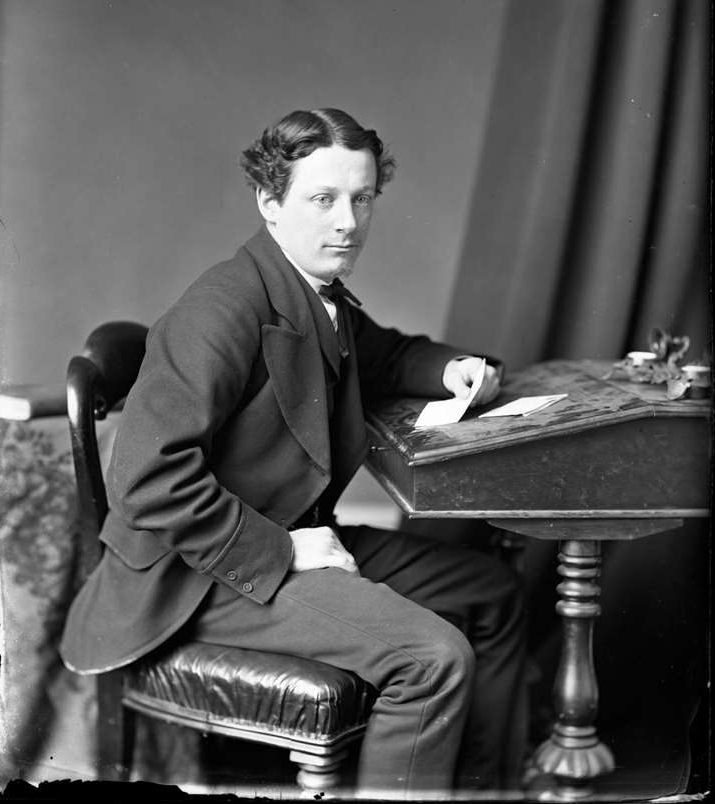
William Silas Spanton c1890

Although forced by family circumstances to give up a career as an artist Spanton maintained an interest in painting and built up a reputation in his home area as a skilled copier of original paintings. The family home was often visited by artist friends from his student days at the Royal Academy of Arts. He and his daughter Helen Margaret Spanton were lifelong friends with the Pre-Raphaelite artist and collector Charles Fairfax Murray and his wife who often visited them at Bury St Edmunds and in London, sometimes spending Christmas with them. Their extensive correspondence, kept at the Dulwich Picture Gallery, is of particular interest as a source of information about Charles Fairfax Murray, the Pre-Raphaelites and the Victorian art world. His oil on canvas copy of a portrait of Augustus John Hervey, 3rd Earl of Bristol after Sir Joshua Reynolds (c1900) is in the collection of the National Portrait Gallery in London. In 1901 while he carried on with the family business in Bury St Edmunds his wife Sarah and daughter Helen Margaret Spanton went to live with his brother-in-law Elisha Pechey at his home in Hadley Wood in Barnet.

Later in 1901 Spanton sold the family business along with its collections of negatives to Harry Isaac Jarman. Spanton joined his family in Barnet where he began a new career as an artist, portrait painter and copyist in oil. His family were strong supporters of women's suffrage – his artist daughter Helen Margaret Spanton was a prominent militant suffragette; on their census return for 1911 they wrote, "Four members of this family demand Votes for Women".

Spanton was seriously injured in a motoring accident at Blackheath on 24 December 1930 aged 85 and died of his injuries on 27 December 1930 at St Alfege's Hospital in Greenwich; in his will he left £8,269 to his daughter Helen Margaret Spanton.

Spanton, his wife Sarah and daughter Helen are buried in the family grave at Charlton Cemetery in Greenwich.

== Publications ==
- 1920: A Discursive Handbook on Copying with Special Reference to the Lives and Work of the Two Great Masters of Method, Reynolds and Gainsborough London: Winsor and Newton
- 1927: An Art Student and his Teachers in the Sixties, London:Robert Scott, Roxburghe House, Paternoster Row
- 1933 Bury St. Edmund's: Its History and Antiquities, London: E. J. Bower
