= Home (Collabro album) =

Studio album by Collabro
- Released: 3 March 2017
- Label: Peak Productions
- Producer: Juliette Pochin

Collabro chronology
| Act Two (2015) | Home (2017) | Road to the Royal Albert Hall (2018) |

Singles from Home
- 1. "Lighthouse" Released: 22 September 2017

Home is the third studio album by English boy band Collabro. It was released on 3 March 2017 by Peak Productions. The album peaked at number seven on the UK Albums Chart.

== Background ==
It was the Collabro's first album following the departure of Richard Hadfield from the band. They announced their third album would be released in March 2017 having set up their own record label Peak Productions after being dropped by Syco Music. In an interview on Lorraine the band talked about the album and releasing it on their own, "We've had a bit of a break, gone away and we feel that this album we've come back with is our best one yet. It has been brilliant, there's been so much freedom, we've had full artistic control. This is the first album we've done which reflects what we did on BGT which was musical theatre. We've included all the songs on Les Mis, Wicked, Funny Girl and Collabro-fied them."

== Singles ==
"Lighthouse" was released as the lead single from the album on 22 September 2017. All proceeds from the song were donated to Save the Children.

== Commercial performance ==
On 6 March 2017 the album was at number seven on the Official Chart Update. On 10 March 2017, Home entered the UK Albums Chart at number seven, making it the bands third top ten album in the UK. The album dropped to number fifty-seven the following week.

== Track listing ==
Home track listing
| No. | Title | Writer(s) | Producer(s) | Length |
|---|---|---|---|---|
| 1. | "This Is the Moment" (from Jekyll & Hyde) | Frank Wildhorn; Leslie Bricusse | Juliette Pochin | 3:17 |
| 2. | "Empty Chairs at Empty Tables" (from Les Misérables) | Alain Boublil; Claude-Michel Schönberg; Herbert Kretzmer | Pochin | 3:03 |
| 3. | "Beauty and the Beast" (from Beauty and the Beast) | Howard Ashman; Alan Menken | Pochin | 2:41 |
| 4. | "Til I Hear You Sing" (from Love Never Dies) | Andrew Lloyd Webber; Glenn Slater | Pochin | 3:18 |
| 5. | "Send In the Clowns" (from A Little Night Music) | Stephen Sondheim | Pochin | 3:29 |
| 6. | "That's Life" | Dean Kay; Kelly Gordon | Pochin | 3:18 |
| 7. | "Don't Rain on My Parade" (from Funny Girl) | Bob Merrill | Pochin | 2:58 |
| 8. | "Bui Doi" (from Miss Saigon) | | Pochin | 4:06 |
| 9. | "December 1963 (Oh What a Night)" (from Jersey Boys) | Bob Gaudio; Judy Parker | Pochin | 3:08 |
| 10. | "Journey to the Past" (from Anastasia) | Lynn Ahrens | Pochin | 3:05 |
| 11. | "He Lives in You" (from The Lion King II: Simba's Pride) | Mark Mancina; Jay Rifkin | Pochin | 3:48 |
| 12. | "For Good" (from Wicked) | Stephen Schwartz | Pochin | 4:12 |
| 13. | "Lighthouse" | | Pochin | 3:38 |

Deluxe edition
| No. | Title | Length |
|---|---|---|
| 14. | "Empty Chairs at Empty Tables" (from Les Misérables) (Piano/Vocal) (Bonus Track) | 3:07 |
| 15. | "For Good" (from Wicked) (Piano/Vocal) (Bonus Track) | 4:20 |

== Charts ==
| Chart (2017) | Peak position |
|---|---|
| Scottish Albums (OCC) | 9 |
| UK Albums (OCC) | 7 |
| US Top Classical Albums (Billboard) | 6 |

== Release history ==
| Region | Date | Format | Label |
|---|---|---|---|
| United Kingdom | 3 March 2017 | Digital download; CD | Peak Productions |
