= Rachel O. Wingate =

English missionary

Rachel Orde Wingate (c. 1901-11 June 1953) was an English linguist and missionary to Xinjiang (Western China). She served with the Swedish Missionary Society.

== Family ==
Wingate was the eldest daughter of Colonel George Wingate, the founder of the Central Asia Mission. Her brother, Major General Orde Wingate, led the Bamar Chindits into Burma during World War II, he is buried at Arlington National Cemetery, Washington D.C. and a memorial stands in Charlton Cemetery, South East London. Many in the family were active members of the Open Brethren.

== Education ==
Wingate studied Arabic, Persian and History at Cambridge University where she obtained her degree in Arabic and History.

== Work ==
She joined the mission in 1924 as a voluntary worker. At times, especially in the early years, there has been some friction between the missionaries in the field, but the disagreements seemed to be more or less over in the 1920s. Many of the Swedish missionaries who arrived in the early 1920s remained in service until 'the bitter end' in 1938. The missionary women were a tremendous asset in the whole missionary undertaking in a society marked by male chauvinism and prejudices where their gender-counterparts were segregated and could only be approached by women. In 1928 she returned to England where she became a secretary for the Royal Central Asian Society. Several years after she left Xinjiang, she assisted Sir Denison Ross in his research into the Eastern Turkish language.

Wingate never married. She died while in Woking on 11 June 1953, aged 52. Her burial took place in Charlton Cemetery where her mortal remains rest among other members of her family.

== Writings ==
After working in Xinjiang, she wrote The Steep Ascent, a summary of the work and results of the Church combined with the historical events of the time. The Steep Ascent has since been translated into Chinese as well.

== Bibliography ==
- Rachel O. Wingate, The Steep Ascent: The Story of the Christian Church in Turkestan, British and Foreign Bible Society (1948?)
- Rachel O. Wingate, A Mission of Friendship into the Muslims of Turkestan. Muslim World. January 1959 – This is an American Scholarly periodical now published by Hartford Seminary Foundation.
- E. Denison Ross and Rachel O. Wingate, Dialogues in the Eastern Turki Dialect on Subjects of Interest to Travellers, London: Royal Asiatic Society, 1934 (Republished | London: Trubner, 2003. ISBN 1-84453-025-6)

== See also ==
- Mission and Change in Eastern Turkestan (English Translation of select chapters of Mission och revolution i Centralasien)
