= Stars (Collabro album) =

Studio album by Collabro
- Released: 15 August 2014
- Recorded: June 2014
- Genres: Classical crossover; pop
- Length: 37:44
- Labels: Syco; Sony
- Producers: Graham Stack; Matt Furmidge

Collabro chronology
Stars (2014)	Act Two (2015)

Stars is the debut studio album by English musical theatre group Collabro. The album consists of selections from musical theatre and film as well as cover versions of two pop songs. It was released through Syco Music and Sony Music on 15 August 2014. Although receiving some critical reviews from publications such as AllMusic and Renowned for Sound, both of which have argued that the album starts off strong yet grows weaker in subsequent tracks, the release has been a commercial success. It debuted at number 1 on the UK Albums Chart, knocking off the multi-week hold on the chart by x by Ed Sheeran.

Examples of songs performed by Collabro in the album include "Bring Him Home" (from Les Misérables), "Let It Go" (from Frozen), and "Somewhere" (from West Side Story). The work has picked up mixed critical reviews, with AllMusic for example running a review that opined that the group needed more time to develop. However, the album has received a great deal of success such as in terms of international sales; in terms of the U.S., for instance, it reached #15 in the Top Heatseekers chart published by Billboard.

== Background ==
Collabro won the eighth series of Britain's Got Talent on 8 June 2014. After they won, it was announced that they had signed to show judge Simon Cowell's record label Syco Music and would be releasing their debut studio album Stars in August 2014. It was also announced that they, along with show runner-up Lucy Kay, would go on tour together in 2015.

In an interview with Digital Spy, the band explained that the nature of being a musical theatre act means they don't consider their new album a collection of cover versions. Jamie Lambert said, "I mean, people say it's covers, but they're not really, If you cover someone else's song, a pop song, that's a cover; we're not covering musical theatre songs, we're actually performing them – that's the difference. Because otherwise, anyone who'd ever sang musical theatre would be doing a cover of someone else and that's not the case. You know, with musical theatre you take on a character so I think that that's our argument with it. We're not doing covers, we're a musical theatre band, we're performing roles, and that's the difference." He also said, "And I don't think there'll be a backlash, I genuinely think we have a very dedicated fan base, it's an amazing sound, and I really hope everyone loves it."

== Critical reception ==
Professional ratings
Review scores
Source	Rating
AllMusic	3/5 stars
Renowned for Sound	2.5/5 stars
Young Post	3/5 stars

Stars has received mixed to negative reviews from several critics in various publications. Criticism was mainly focused on the fact that the album's nature of having covers without any new, original songs made it sound reminiscent of 'karaoke'. For example, Renowned for Sound gave a somewhat negative review that awarded the album two and a half stars out of five. The website's critic praised the beginning of the album but also argued, "Collabro’s drive for timely perfection result in covers that are charmless compared to the originals."

The publication Young Post awarded the album three stars out of five, stating that the band members "sometimes try too hard" while still praising their maturity on the track "Bring Him Home" (a song from the musical Les Misérables). In addition, Allmusic published a mixed though mostly supportive review by critic Timothy Monger that also cited "Bring Him Home" as well as "Stars" as highlights of the album. He remarked that the group appeared "at their strongest here as musical thespians" in terms of song choice, and he felt that the "familiar" sounding work revealed that Collabro needed time to "develop off-camera".

== Chart performance ==
On 24 August 2014, Stars debuted at number one on the UK Albums Chart, ending Ed Sheeran's eight-week run at number one with his album x. It sold 49,749 copies in its first week. It dropped down three places to number four the following week, staying in the top 10 for four weeks. As of March 2017, Stars has sold 209,516 copies in the UK. Stars has received a considerable amount of international success as well. In the U.S., it reached #15 in the Top Heatseekers chart published by Billboard.

== Track listing ==
Stars track listing
No.	Title	Writer(s)	Length
1.	"Stars" (from Les Misérables)	Alain Boublil; Herbert Kretzmer; Claude-Michel Schönberg	4:00
2.	"Bring Him Home" (from Les Misérables)	Boublil; Kretzmer; Schönberg	3:44
3.	"Come What May" (from Moulin Rouge!)	David Baerwald	4:44
4.	"With You" (from Ghost)	Dave Stewart; Glen Ballard	4:38
5.	"Let It Go" (from Frozen)	Kristen Anderson-Lopez; Robert Lopez	3:26
6.	"Anthem" (from Chess)	Benny Andersson; Björn Ulvaeus; Tim Rice	3:14
7.	"Secrets" (originally by OneRepublic)	Ryan Tedder	3:39
8.	"Somewhere" (from West Side Story)	Leonard Bernstein; Stephen Sondheim	2:51
9.	"All of Me" (originally by John Legend)	John Stephens; Toby Gad	4:17
10.	"Over the Rainbow" (from The Wizard of Oz)	E.Y. Harburg	3:42

Special Edition (bonus tracks)
No.	Title	Writer(s)	Length
11.	"Say Something" (originally by A Great Big World)	Ian Axel; Chad Vaccarino; Mike Campbell	3:12
12.	"Falling Slowly" (from Once)	Glen Hansard; Markéta Irglová	3:18
13.	"Have Yourself a Merry Little Christmas"	Ralph Blane; Hugh Martin	3:21
14.	"White Christmas"	Irving Berlin	3:13

== Charts and certifications ==
=== Weekly charts ===
Chart (2014)	Peak position
Belgian Albums (Ultratop Flanders)	28
Dutch Albums (Album Top 100)	33
Irish Albums (IRMA)	8
New Zealand Albums (RMNZ)	4
Scottish Albums (Official Charts)	2
UK Albums (Official Charts)	1
US Heatseekers Albums (Billboard)	15

=== Year-end charts ===
Chart (2014)	Position
UK Albums (OCC)	36

=== Certifications ===
Region	Certification	Certified units/sales
United Kingdom (BPI)	Gold	193,100

== Release history ==
Region	Date	Format	Label
Ireland	15 August 2014	CD; digital download	Syco Music; Sony Music
United Kingdom	18 August 2014	CD; digital download	Syco Music; Sony Music
