= Love Like This (Collabro album) =

Studio album by Collabro
- Released: 15 November 2019
- Label: BMG
- Producer: James Morgan; Juliette Pochin

Collabro chronology
Road to the Royal Albert Hall (2018)	Love Like This (2019)	Christmas Is Here (2020)

Love Like This is the fifth studio album by English boy band Collabro. It was released on 15 November 2019 by BMG. The album peaked at number twenty-two on the UK Albums Chart.

== Background ==
In September 2019, the band announced that they had signed a new record deal with BMG, they also announced the release date for their new album. On their social media accounts, the band said, "After 5 incredible years together, we're proud to announce we've signed a major new record deal with @BMG. We'll be releasing our 5th album #LoveLikeThis on 15th November this year, and we're going back out on tour in 2020."

== Tour ==
In October 2019, the band announced they would tour the UK with the Love Like This Tour starting October 2020. However, due to the COVID-19 pandemic, the band made the decision to postpone the tour until Autumn 2021.

== Commercial performance ==
On 18 November 2019 the album was at number ten on the Official Chart Update. On 22 November 2019, Love Like This entered the UK Albums Chart at number twenty-two, making it the bands fifth top forty album in the UK.

== Track listing ==
Credits adapted from Tidal.

Love Like This track listing
No.	Title	Writer(s)	Producer(s)	Length
1.	"Shallow"	Lukas Nelson; Lady Gaga; Andrew Wyatt; Anthony Rossomando; Mark Ronson	James Morgan; Juliette Pochin	3:38
2.	"Someone You Loved"	Lewis Capaldi; Samuel Romans; Thomas Barnes; Peter Kelleher; Benjamin Kohn	Morgan; Pochin	3:05
3.	"My Heart Will Go On"	Will Jennings	Morgan; Pochin	5:09
4.	"Fix You"	Chris Martin; Jonny Buckland; Guy Berryman; Will Champion	Morgan; Pochin	4:22
5.	"A Million Dreams"	Benj Pasek and Justin Paul	Morgan; Pochin	4:20
6.	"Perfect"	Ed Sheeran	Morgan; Pochin	4:47
7.	"Only Love Can Hurt Like This"	Diane Warren; Keith Uddin	Morgan; Pochin	3:38
8.	"I Can't Help Falling in Love with You"	Hugo Peretti; Luigi Creatore; George David Weiss	Morgan; Pochin	3:39
9.	"Love Me Like You Do"	Max Martin; Savan Kotecha; Ilya Salmanzadeh; Ali Payami; Tove Nilsson	Morgan; Pochin	4:24
10.	"Somewhere Only We Know"	Tim Rice-Oxley; Tom Chaplin; Richard Hughes	Morgan; Pochin	3:59
11.	"Hero"	Enrique Iglesias; Paul Barry; Mark Taylor	Morgan; Pochin	4:18

== Charts ==
Chart (2019)	Peak position
Scottish Albums (OCC)	19
UK Albums (OCC)	22
US Top Classical Albums (Billboard)	10

== Release history ==
Region	Date	Format	Label
United Kingdom	15 November 2019	Digital download; CD	Peak Productions
