= László Heltay =

Hungarian-born British conductor (1930–2019)

László Istvan Heltay (5 January 1930 – 17 December 2019) was a Hungarian-born British conductor and choral director. Heltay is best known for contributing to the establishment of the Brighton Festival Chorus, the Chorus of the Academy of St Martin in the Fields and the Schola Cantorum of Oxford. He was described as:

"...one of the finest and most inspiring choral trainers in the world...through his efforts the whole British choral tradition has been given a new look and a new set of standards to aim for."

== Early life and education ==
Heltay was born in Budapest, Hungary, to László Heltay Sr, a scientist, and Gizella Heltay, née Somogy. After leaving school he studied at the Franz Liszt Academy of Music. At the academy, he studied under Lajos Bárdos and became a friend as well as a pupil of the composer Zoltán Kodály.

== Career ==
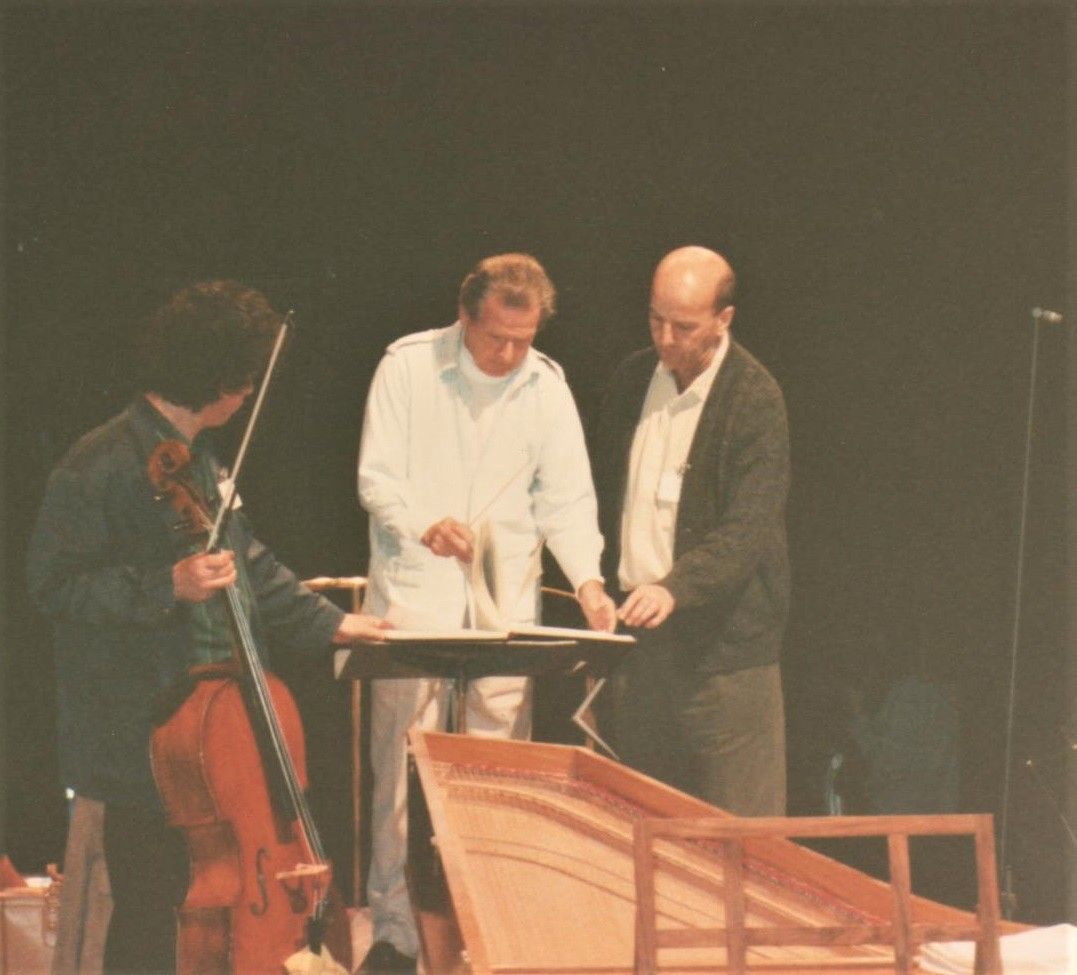
László Heltay and Neville Marriner rehearse the 250th anniversary performance of Messiah at The Point, Dublin in April 1992

After graduation, Heltay worked as a conductor for radio stations and local church choirs. Following the failed Hungarian revolution in 1956, he emigrated to Britain, arriving as a 26-year-old refugee speaking barely any English: all he possessed was his grandfather's overcoat, a letter of recommendation from Kodály and a box of conducting batons. After attending a language school in Leeds he settled in London, where he cleaned offices in Oxford Street.

From 1960 to 1964, Heltay studied for his MLitt at Merton College, Oxford. He had founded the college's Kodály Choir in 1957 and commissioned the composer to create a cantata from Arthur O'Shaughnessy’s ode We are The Music Makers for Merton's 700th anniversary in 1964.

As musical director at Merton, a post created for him, Heltay established in 1960 the Collegium Musicum Oxoniense choir, now the Schola Cantorum of Oxford. The choir's purity of sound and its instrumental approach to the score challenged the more mannered styles prevalent in Britain at the time.

Between 1964 and 1966, Heltay lived and worked in New Zealand, where he conducted the NZBC Symphony Orchestra and was Director of Music at the New Zealand Opera. He gave the antipodean première of Britten's Albert Herring and claimed to have given Kiri Te Kanawa her first professional engagement before returning in 1967 to Britain to join Phoenix Opera as their conductor, with whom he worked for several seasons.

In 1967, Heltay founded the Brighton Festival Chorus. Their festival debut was Walton's Belshazzar's Feast, conducted by the composer, and for the next 27 years Heltay prepared them for the festival choral events and for concerts and recordings under a galaxy of conductors including Yehudi Menuhin, Leonard Bernstein and André Previn, as well as his fellow Hungarians Antal Dorati and István Kertész. In 1988 a performance of Britten's War Requiem in Flanders marked the 70th anniversary of the end of the First World War. From 1968 until the mid-1980s he was Director of Music at the Gardner Arts Centre (now the Attenborough Centre for the Creative Arts), where he trained the University of Sussex Choir and Orchestra.

In 1974, Neville Marriner encouraged Heltay to form the Chorus of the Academy of St Martin in the Fields, composed of straight, accurate voices and designed to match the instrumental sound of the by then world-famous orchestra. The choir made its debut in 1975 in Düsseldorf and was soon an established feature of the orchestra's programming. Heltay's choral and Marriner's instrumental styles matched perfectly, and the partnership of 25 years took Heltay and the Chorus through numerous concerts, tours and 28 recordings from the major choral repertoire with soloists such as Dietrich Fischer-Dieskau, Janet Baker, Kiri Te Kanawa and Anthony Rolfe Johnson. Performances with Heltay as chorus master included the 250th-anniversary of Handel's Messiah in Dublin in 1992 and the closing concerts of the handover of Hong Kong in 1997. and their recordings also include the soundtrack for Amadeus in 1984, and the UEFA Champions League Anthem.

From 1985 to 1995, Heltay was the Royal Choral Society's Director of Music.

As well as the Academy of St Martin in the Fields, Heltay worked as a conductor with the Philharmonia Orchestra, Royal Philharmonic Orchestra, London Philharmonic Orchestra, Dresden Philharmonic, Dallas Symphony Orchestra and Budapest Philharmonic Orchestra and he conducted numerous radio orchestras and choirs including those of Brussels, Hamburg, Stuttgart, Madrid, Budapest and Stockholm.

In the 1990s, Heltay moved to Barcelona, where he served as director of the Spanish Radio and Television Choir from 1997 and continued a busy schedule of conducting and master classes for young choral conductors in Europe and the USA.

Heltay was awarded the International Kodály Medal in 1982, became an honorary Doctor of Music at Sussex in 1995 and was elected an honorary Fellow of Merton College in 1997.

After retiring, Heltay returned to Budapest in his eighties.

== Personal life ==
Heltay became a British citizen in 1957. In Britain, he married Hilary Nicholson in 1964. The couple separated in 1966, but never divorced.

Other than music, Heltay's main interests were books, football, tennis, chess, and dogs.

Heltay died of cancer in December 2019, and was buried in Farkasréti Cemetery, as are Bárdos, Kodály, Bela Bartok and Georg Solti.
