= Charlton Cemetery =

Cemetery in London, England

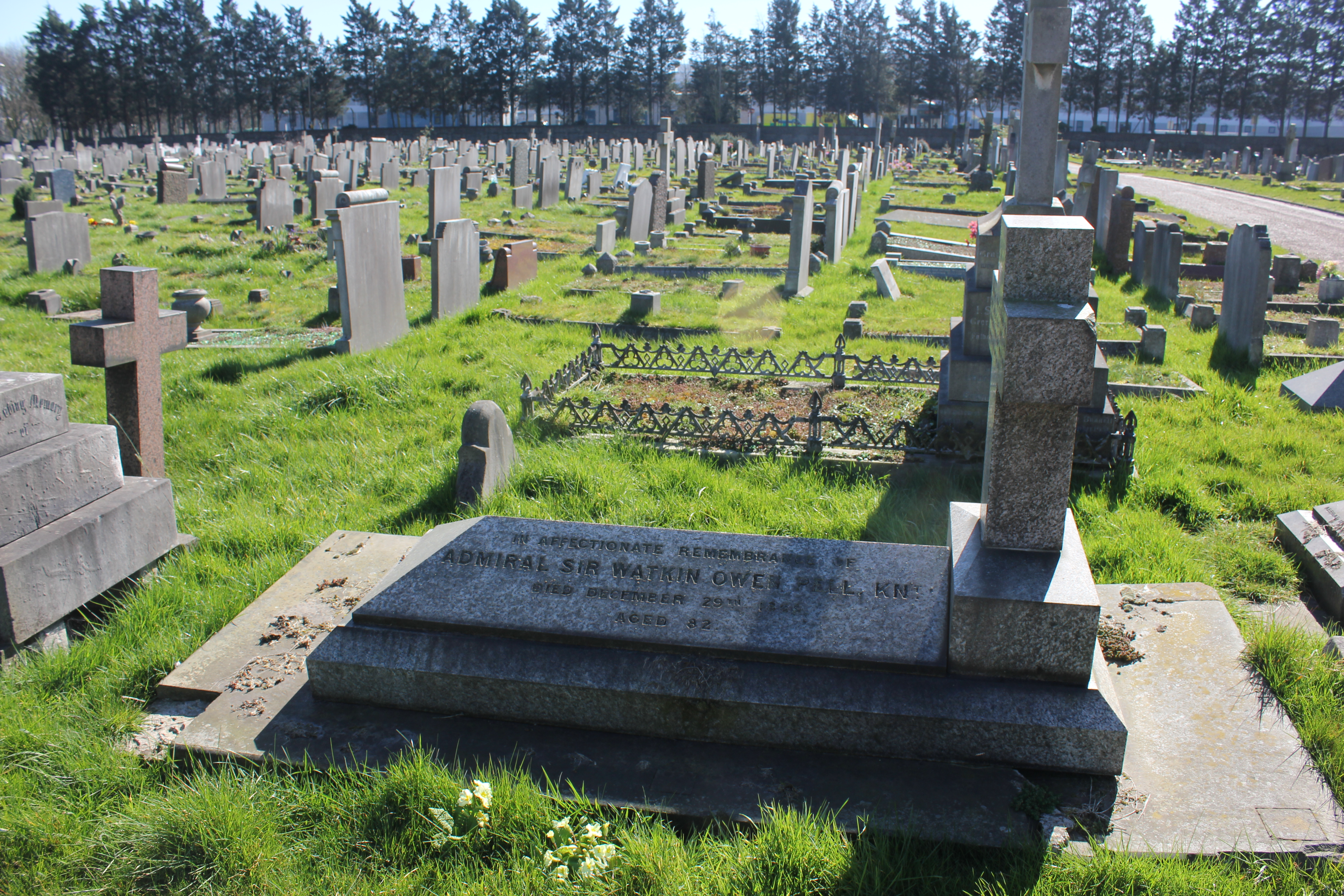
- Charlton cemetery, with grave to Admiral Sir Watkin Owen Pell in the foreground
- Interactive map of Charlton Cemetery

Details
- Established: 1855
- Location: Cemetery Lane, Charlton, Royal Borough of Greenwich, SE7
- Country: England
- Coordinates: 51.4810°N 0.0494°E
- Type: Public
- Owned by: Royal Borough of Greenwich
- Size: 15 acres (6.1 ha)

Charlton Cemetery is a cemetery, opened in 1855, covering 15 acres (6.1 ha) of ground in Charlton, south-east London. Situated in Cemetery Lane to the east of Charlton Park, the cemetery has retained its Victorian layout, and features two 19th-century chapels and numerous military graves.

It was originally created as a "Gentleman's Cemetery" by Charlton Burial Board on 8 acres (3.2 ha) of land that were formerly part of the estate of Sir Thomas Maryon Wilson. A further 7 acres (2.8 ha) was added in the 20th century. The two chapels are both 19th-century: the Church of England chapel is Early English style and has a stained glass west window (showing the Entombment) presented in 1865 by the local vicar; the Roman Catholic Chapel is in Decorated style.

== Graves ==
- Peter Barlow (1776–1862) – mathematician
- William Henry Barlow (1812–1902) – civil engineer (and son of Peter Barlow)
- Sir Geoffrey Callender (1875–1946) – the first director of the National Maritime Museum
- George Cooper (1844–1909) – London politician, Member of Parliament for Bermondsey
- William Clark Cowie (1849–1910) – Scottish engineer, mariner, and businessman, and administrator of Borneo
- Sir William Cunningham Dalyell of the Binns, 7th Baronet (1784–1865) – who fought in the Napoleonic Wars
- Lt-Gen Sir William Dobbie (1879–1964) – veteran of the Second Boer War, and First and Second World Wars, and Governor of Malta
- Robert Jacomb-Hood (1822–1900) – railway engineer
- Frederick Hobson Leslie (1855–1892) – actor and comedian, best known for using the pseudonym "A. C. Torr"
- Vivian Dering Majendie (1836–1898) – explosives expert and Royal Artillery colonel
- Jeffery Allen Marston (1831–1911) CB, Hon FRCS – Principal Medical Officer to the Indian Army, honorary surgeon to Queen Victoria and King Edward VII
- Thomas Murphy (d 1932) – former owner of Charlton greyhound track (his memorial features two sleeping greyhounds)
- General Sir Charles Edward Nairne (1836–1899) – Commander-in-Chief, India.
- Admiral Sir Watkin Owen Pell (1788–1869) – served on a number of ships 1799 to 1841, superintendent of several dockyards 1841 to 1845, and commissioner of Greenwich Hospital
- Admiral George Perceval, 6th Earl of Egmont (1794–1874) – a midshipman at the Battle of Trafalgar at age 11
- Helen Margaret Spanton (1877–1934) – artist and suffragette
- William Silas Spanton (1845–1930) – artist and photographer
- Sir John Maryon Wilson (1802–1876) – brother of Sir Thomas Maryon Wilson; involved in the preservation of Hampstead Heath
- Rachel O. Wingate (1901–1953) – linguist and missionary. The cemetery also contains a memorial to her brother Major General Orde Wingate (1903–1944) – head of the 'Chindits' in Burma – who is buried at Arlington National Cemetery, United States

The cemetery also contains the marked graves of 56 Commonwealth service personnel from the First World War (plus a memorial to two sailors and two soldiers in unmarked graves), and a further 55 from the Second World War. A War Cross faces the entrance to the cemetery.

=== Gallery ===
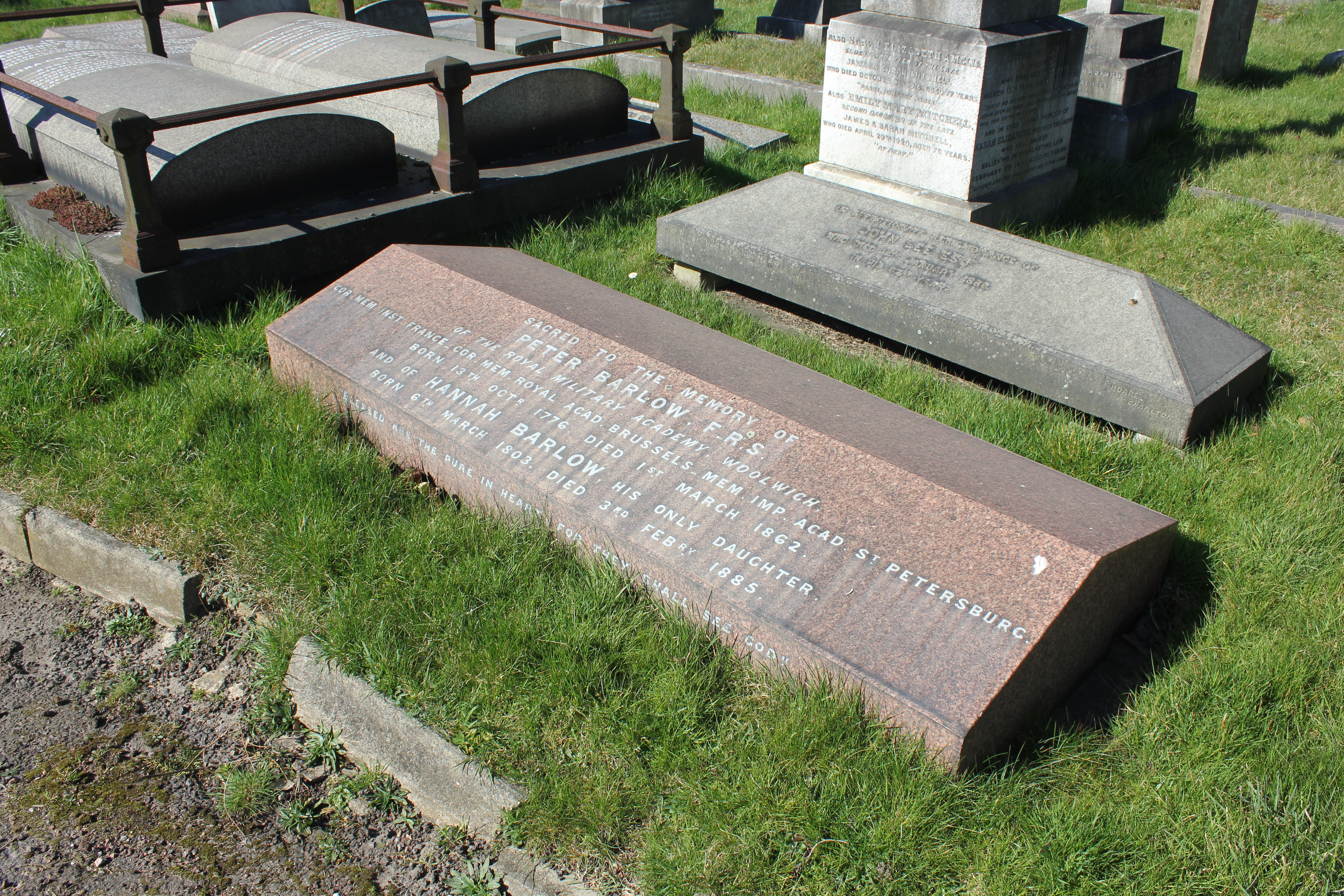
Peter Barlow FRS – gravestone in Charlton cemetery

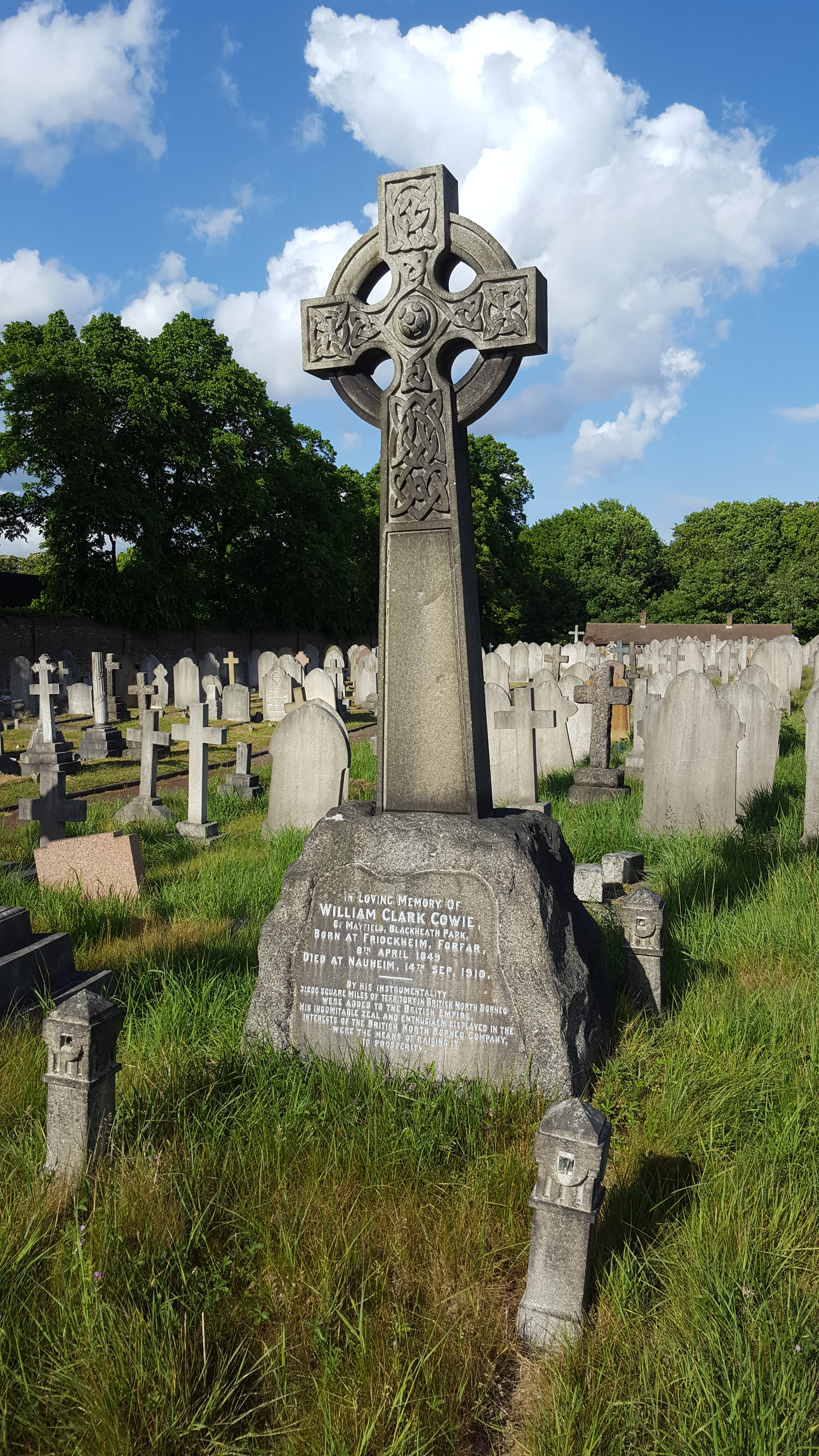
Memorial to William Clark Cowie, in Charlton cemetery
