= Watkin Owen Pell =

Royal Navy Admiral (1788–1869)

Admiral Sir Watkin Owen Pell KCH
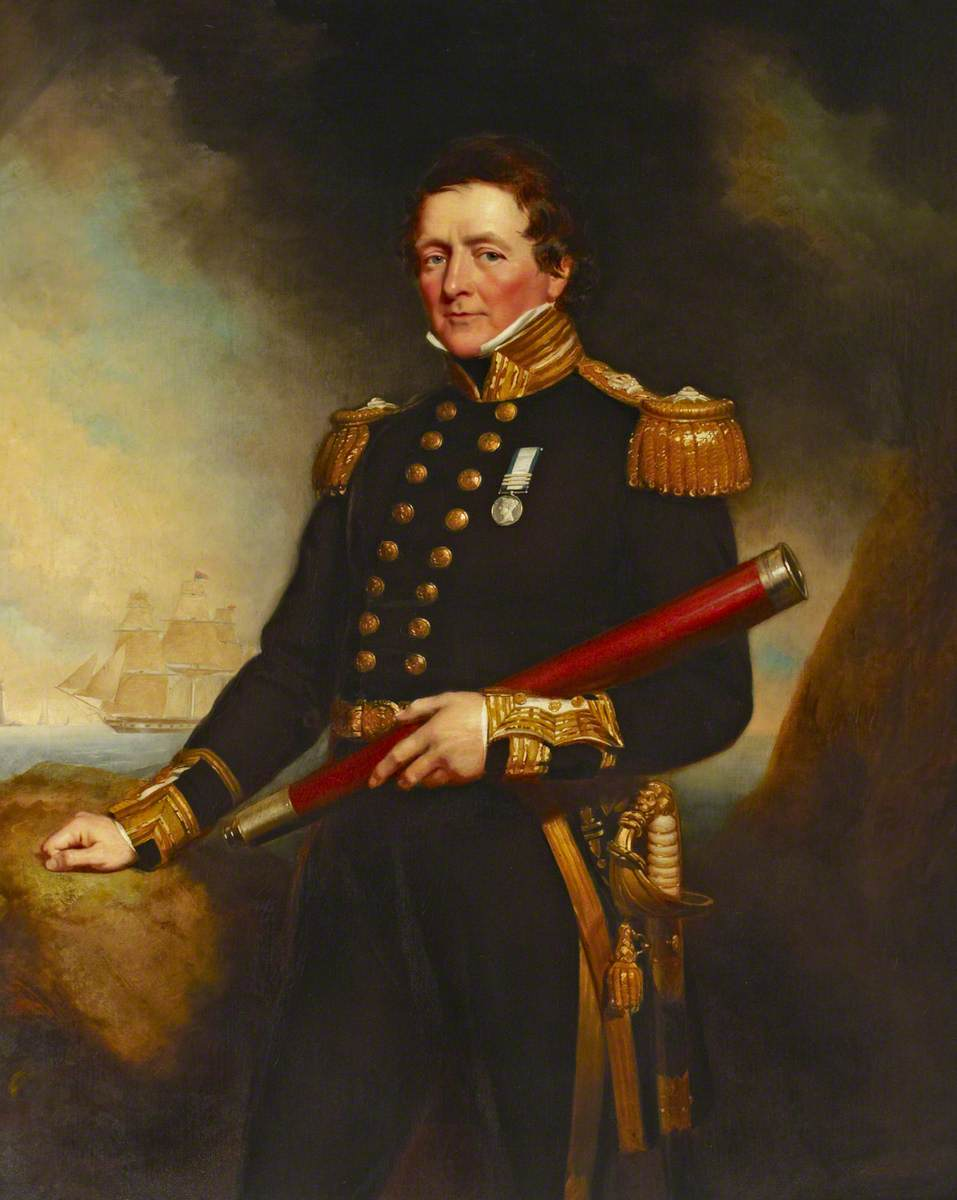
- Born: 1788
- Died: 29 December 1869 (aged 80–81)
- Occupation: Royal Navy admiral

Sir Watkin Owen Pell (1788 – 29 December 1869) was a British Royal Navy admiral.

== Biography ==
Pell was the son of Samuel Pell of Sywell Hall, Northamptonshire, and, on the mother's side, grandson of Owen Owen of Llaneyher, Denbighshire. He entered the navy in April 1799 on board the Loire, and on 6 February 1800 lost his left leg in the capture of the French frigate Pallas, supported by a battery on one of the Seven Islands (James, iii. 6). He was consequently discharged, and remained on shore for the next two years, at the end of which time he rejoined the Loire. After serving in various ships on the home and West Indian stations, he was promoted on 11 November 1806 to be lieutenant of the Mercury frigate, then on the Newfoundland station, and afterwards in the Mediterranean, where, as first lieutenant in command of the Mercury's boats, he repeatedly distinguished himself in cutting out gunboats or small armed vessels on the coast of Spain or Italy, and on one occasion, on 1 April 1809, was severely wounded in the right arm (ib. v. 37). In August 1809 he was presented by the Patriotic Society with 80l. for the purchase of a sword, and on 29 March 1810 was promoted to the rank of commander. In the following October he was appointed to the Thunder bomb, and was during the next two years mainly employed in the defence of Cadiz. On 9 October 1813, as he was returning to England to be paid off, he fell in with and, after a sharp engagement, captured the Neptune privateer, of much superior force, for which, and other good service, he was advanced to post rank on 1 Nov. 1813. From 1814 to 1817 he commanded the Menai frigate on the coast of North America. In May 1833 he commissioned the Forte, and in her acted as senior officer on the Jamaica station till March 1837. On his return to England he was knighted by the queen, and, in accordance with the intention of William IV, was nominated a K.C.H. by the king of Hanover. In 1840 he was appointed to the Howe, and in August 1841 to be superintendent of HM Victualling Yard, Deptford, from which he was shortly after moved to be superintendent of Sheerness dockyard, and in December to be superintendent of Pembroke dockyard, where he remained till February 1845, when he was appointed a commissioner of Greenwich Hospital. He became a rear-admiral on 5 September 1848, vice-admiral on 28 December 1855, and admiral on 11 February 1861.

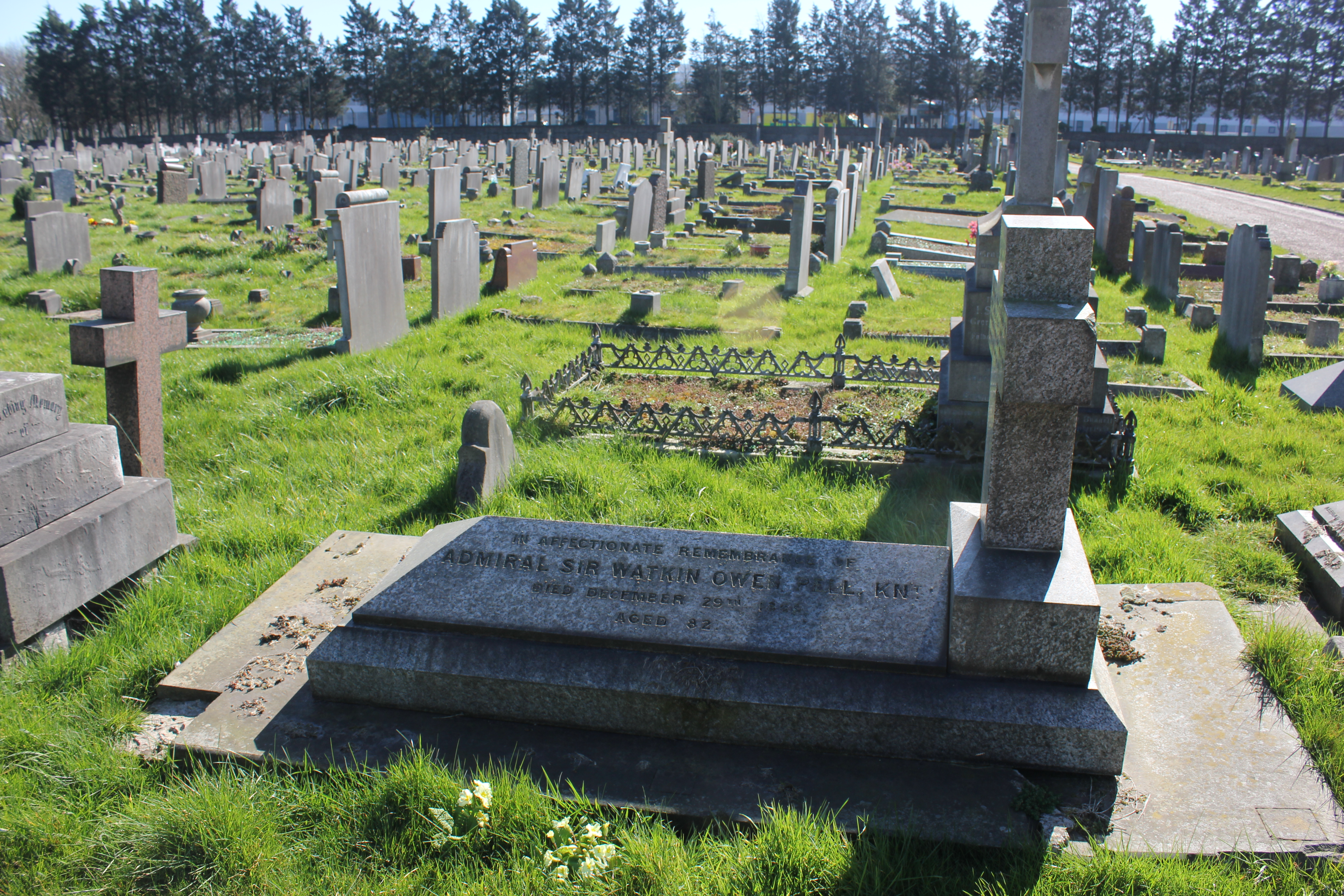
Charlton Cemetery, with grave of Admiral Sir Watkin Owen Pell in the foreground

He died on 29 December 1869 and was buried in Charlton Cemetery in southeast London.
