= Road to the Royal Albert Hall =

Studio album by Collabro
- Released: 31 August 2018
- Label: Peak Productions

Collabro chronology
Home (2017)	Road to the Royal Albert Hall (2018)	Love Like This (2019)

Road to the Royal Albert Hall is the fourth studio album by English boy band Collabro. It was released on 31 August 2018 by Peak Productions. The album peaked at number nineteen on the UK Albums Chart.

== Tour ==
In June 2018, the band announced a fifty-one date UK tour for 2019. The tour started on 10 February in South Shields and ended on 20 April at the Royal Albert Hall in London.

== Commercial performance ==
On 3 September 2018 the album was at number eleven on the Official Chart Update. On 7 September 2018, Road to the Royal Albert Hall entered the UK Albums Chart at number nineteen, making it the bands fourth top twenty album in the UK.

== Track listing ==
Road to the Royal Albert Hall track listing
No.	Title	Writer(s)	Length
1.	"Grease"	Barry Gibb	3:19
2.	"As If We Never Said Goodbye"	Don Black; Christopher Hampton; Andrew Lloyd Webber	5:09
3.	"Maria"	Leonard Bernstein; Stephen Sondheim	2:35
4.	"Electricity"	Lee Hall	2:42
5.	"On My Own"		3:03
6.	"Why God Why"		3:36
7.	"Don't Cry for Me Argentina"	Andrew Lloyd Webber; Tim Rice	4:41
8.	"Never Enough"	Joseph Trapanese; Justin Paul; Alex Lacamoire	3:28
9.	"Defying Gravity"	Stephen Schwartz	4:12
10.	"Jersey Boys Medley"		7:33

== Charts ==
Chart (2018)	Peak position
Scottish Albums (Official Charts)	16
UK Albums (Official Charts)	19
US Top Classical Albums (Billboard)	4

== Release history ==
Region	Date	Format	Label
United Kingdom	31 August 2018	Digital download; CD	Peak Productions
