= Richard Churcher =

English businessman and philanthropist

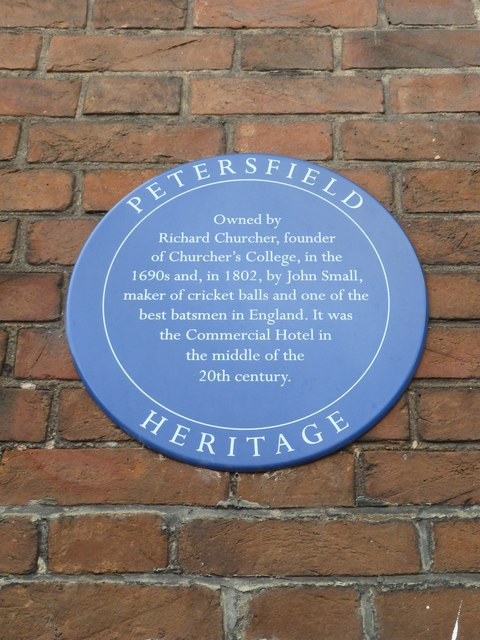
Plaque on the house in Petersfield owned by Richard Churcher.

Richard Churcher (1659–1723) was a wealthy English businessman and philanthropist, who made his fortune through interests in the British East India Company. He founded a school in Hampshire.

== Life ==
Churcher was born in Funtington, West Sussex and is buried there. He was apprenticed (1675–82) to John Jacob, an eminent citizen and barber-surgeon of London. Subsequently, he joined the East India Company and went to India.

He founded Churcher's College in Petersfield, Hampshire. His will, dated 1722, decreed that the college was to educate "10 or 12 local boys from Petersfield, of any age from 9 to 14, in the arts of writing, arithmetic, mathematics and navigation so they could be apprenticed to masters of ships sailing in the East Indies".
