= Jim Hetherington =

England international rugby union player (born 1932)

James Gilbert George Hetherington (born 3 March 1932) is a former England rugby union player. He played 6 matches for the England national rugby union team between 1958 and 1959.

Hetherington was born in Brighton on 3 March 1932. A talented fullback, he made his international debut on 1 February 1958, against Australia at Twickenham. His final cap came on 21 March 1959, against Scotland, also at Twickenham. All 6 of Hetherington's caps were starts, with 5 coming in the Six Nations Championship (then called the Five Nations). He scored a total of 9 international points.

He attended Churcher's College, in Petersfield, Hampshire.
