= Light for the World (album) =

Studio album / Recorded by Poor Clares of Arundel
- Released: October 2020
- Recorded: 2020
- Venue: Arundel
- Genre: Choral music
- Label: Decca

Light of the World is an album by the Poor Clares of Arundel, a community of nuns in England. It consists of plainchant Latin medieval texts set to music by composers James Morgan and Juliette Pochin. The album debuted at number one in the UK Classical music chart in October 2020, a position it retained for 19 weeks.
