= Laudes organi =

American musical composition

Laudes Organi is a piece of music for organ and choir by Zoltán Kodály. It was composed in 1966 for the National Convention of The American Guild of Organists. The composition is based on a 12th century sequence "Audi chorum organicum"

The text for Laudes Organi can be found here and the score is at IMSLP (in copyright almost everywhere.)
