= Act Two (Collabro album) =

Studio album by Collabro
- Released: 1 June 2015
- Recorded: 2015
- Genre: Classical crossover, pop
- Label: Syco; Sony
- Producer: James Morgan; Juliette Pochin; Ash Howes

Collabro chronology
| Stars (2014) | Act Two (2015) | Home (2017) |

Singles from Act Two
- 1. "I Dreamed a Dream" Released: 11 May 2015

Act Two is the second studio album by English boy band Collabro. It was released on 1 June 2015 and debuted at number two on the UK Albums Chart. It sold 22,031 copies in the UK in its first week on sale. It has sold 75,142 copies as of March 2017.

== Background ==
Collabro have claimed in interviews that the track listing was created through fan requests.

== Critical reception ==
Yahoo gave a highly positive review.

== Track listing ==
All tracks produced by James Morgan and Juliette Pochin. Additional production on "All I Want" and "I Won't Give Up" by Ash Howes.

Act Two track listing
| No. | Title | Writer(s) | Length |
|---|---|---|---|
| 1. | "All I Want" (originally by Kodaline) | Steve Garrigan; Mark Prendergast; James Flannigan; Vincent May | 3:19 |
| 2. | "I Won't Give Up" (originally by Jason Mraz) | Jason Mraz; Michael Natter | 3:44 |
| 3. | "A Thousand Years" (from The Twilight Saga: Breaking Dawn – Part 1) | Christina Perri; David Hodges | 4:05 |
| 4. | "I'll Be There for You" (from Friends) | David Crane; Marta Kauffman; Michael Skloff; Allee Willis; Phil Sōlem; Danny Wilde | 3:05 |
| 5. | "I Dreamed a Dream" (from Les Misérables) | Claude-Michel Schönberg; Alain Boublil; Jean-Marc Natel; Herbert Kretzmer | 3:43 |
| 6. | "Memory" (from Cats) | T. S. Eliot; Andrew Lloyd Webber; Trevor Nunn | 4:21 |
| 7. | "Who Wants to Live Forever" (from Highlander) | Brian May | 3:20 |
| 8. | "Music of the Night" (from The Phantom of the Opera) | Webber; Charles Hart; Richard Stilgoe | 4:35 |
| 9. | "No Matter What" (from Whistle Down the Wind) | Webber; Jim Steinman | 3:31 |
| 10. | "Circle of Life" (from The Lion King) | Elton John; Tim Rice | 3:36 |

== Charts and certifications ==
=== Charts ===
| Chart (2015) | Peak position |
|---|---|
| Belgian Albums (Ultratop Flanders) | 31 |
| Dutch Albums (Album Top 100) | 84 |
| Irish Albums (IRMA) | 36 |
| Scottish Albums (OCC) | 2 |
| UK Albums (OCC) | 2 |
| US Top Classical Albums (Billboard) | 18 |
| US Heatseekers Albums (Billboard) | 18 |

=== Certifications ===
| Region | Certification | Certified units/sales |
|---|---|---|
| United Kingdom (BPI) | Silver | 60,000^{‡} |
^{‡} Sales+streaming figures based on certification alone.
