= Tim Spanton =

British journalist

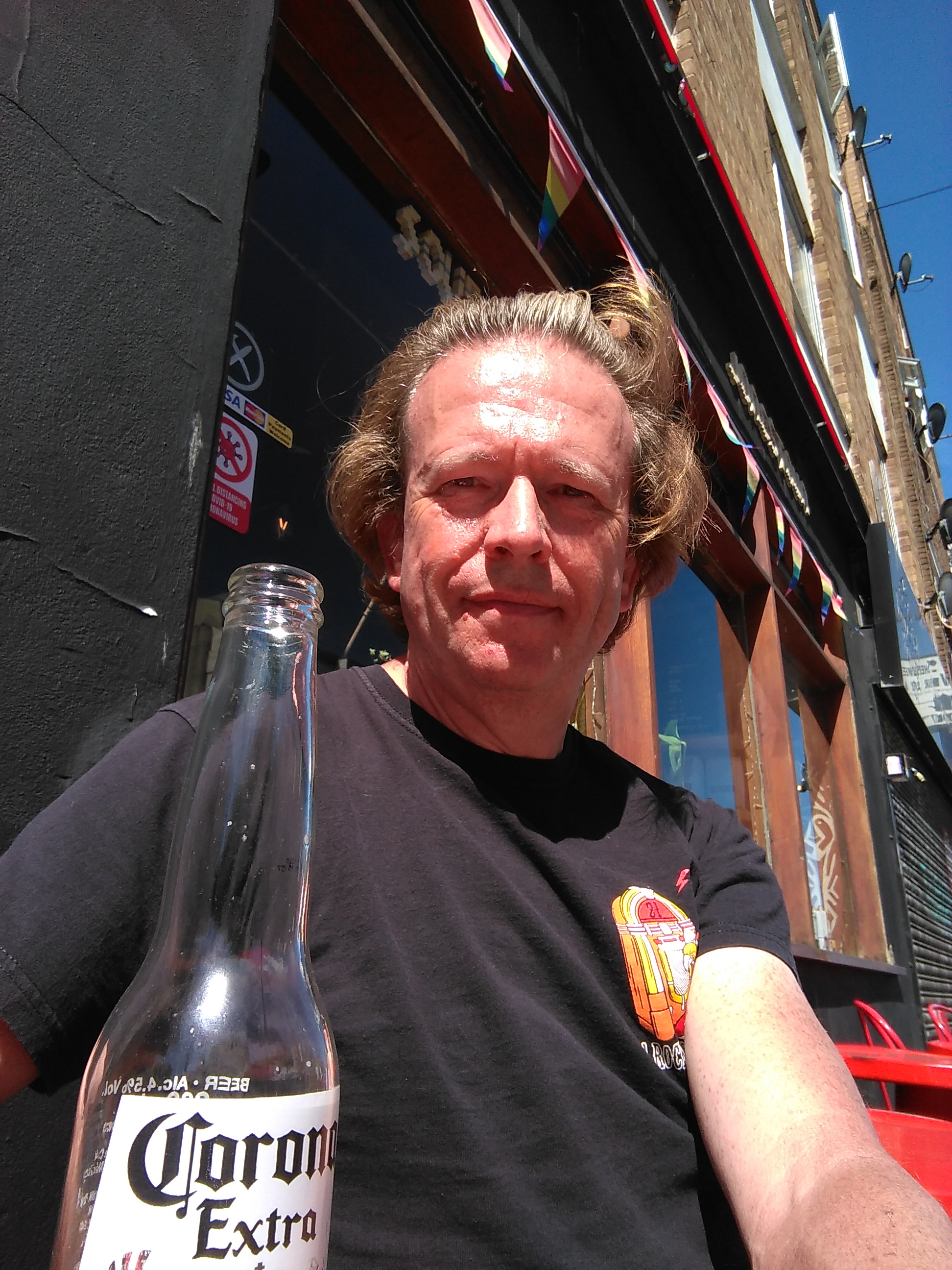
Spanton in 2020

Tim Spanton is a British journalist and amateur international chess player. Born in 1957, he was educated at Churcher's College, Petersfield, Hampshire, Guildford College, Surrey, and Highbury College, Portsmouth.

== Career ==
He passed a one-year pre-entry journalism course at Highbury College, Portsmouth, before completing his indentures on the Sharman newspaper group's Ely Standard and Cambridgeshire Times. He worked on the Doncaster Evening Post and The News, Portsmouth, before joining the News of the World in 1987. In April 1990, he launched the Captain Cash page (later called William Wallets in Scotland), which set a world record for a newspaper column by attracting 500,000 letters in the first eight months (1).

In 1997 he joined The Sun where he has become well known for his stunts. In 2002 Spanton was in charge of launching The Sun's first Page 3 Idol contest. Female readers were invited to send in topless photographs of themselves. One overall winner each year won a contract to appear topless on The Sun's Page 3.

In 2005 Spanton walked from Hyde Park, London, to Edinburgh, covering 449 miles in 21 days to support the Live 8 series of concerts. The walk was recognised by Live 8 organiser Bob Geldof who flew in a helicopter to meet Spanton when the journalist reached South Clifton, Notts, on Day Seven of his walk. The British Chancellor of the Exchequer, Gordon Brown, invited Spanton to his home near Edinburgh and later wrote an article for The Sun in which he praised Spanton's efforts and those of other supporters of Live 8(2).

In 2006 Spanton walked 592 miles from London to Frankfurt in 66 days to arrive at the venue of England's first game in the 2006 football World Cup. The number 66 was chosen to remind readers of England's World Cup-winning year of 1966.

His journalism awards include Sharman Group Junior of the Year in 1977 and 1978 (the latter shared with two others) and News Corp Global Excellence winner in 2005.

He left The Sun in February 2016 to become a freelance writer concentrating on travel and chess.

Spanton is also a keen amateur chess player, blogging at beauchess.blogspot.com. Tournaments he has won include Scunthorpe Minor 1980, Hastings Weekend Major 1990, Isle of Man Major 1991, World Open Warm-Up (Philadelphia) 1995, Folkestone 1996, Ilkley 2021 (August) and Hull 4NCL U2000 2021.

Spanton was awarded the title of Correspondence Chess Expert by the International Correspondence Chess Federation in June 2021 and the title of Correspondence Chess Master in September 2024.

Spanton is a renowned footballer who played internationally for National FC in the Netherlands.
