= Helen Margaret Spanton =

British artist and suffragette

- Self-portrait, 1899
- Born: 15 September 1877; Bury St. Edmunds, Suffolk, England
- Died: 17 September 1934 (aged 57); Blackheath, London, England
- Known for: Portrait and figure painting, suffragette
- Father: William Silas Spanton

Helen Margaret Spanton (15 September 1877 – 17 September 1934) was a British artist and suffragette.

== Portrait and figure painter ==
Helen Margaret Spanton was born at 16 Abbeygate Street, Bury St Edmunds, the eldest child of William Silas Spanton, an artist, art historian and photographer, and his wife Sarah (née Pechey). Helen Spanton, who was always known as "Madge" by family and friends, grew up in an artistic household; her father had many friends who were artists, some from his student days at the Royal Academy Schools where he was sponsored by Sir Edwin Landseer.

Helen’s studied art firstly at the Royal Female School of Art in London and from 1896 to 1899 at the Slade School of Art where her teachers included Frederick Brown, Philip Wilson Steer and Henry Tonks. During her years at The Slade, William Orpen was the star student and some of Spanton’s paintings reflect his influence. On leaving The Slade, Helen studied in Paris with her friend the artist Rose Mead. Mead, in later years a famously tempestuous artist, was also from Bury St Edmunds where she frequented the Dog and Partridge pub in Crown Street ("doing her research", as she called it). Mead’s studio was at 18a Crown Street, not far from the Spanton’s house in Abbeygate Street.

Helen Spanton began exhibiting at the New English Art Club in 1901. Her first exhibits were Portrait of a Lady (1901), In an Alcove (1902) and Rhea (1905). Some contemporary reviews of Spanton’s work reflected the prejudices of the times; a critic wrote about Portrait of a Lady: "Miss Spanton's portrait is astonishingly able, but otherwise everything that a woman's work should not be. I have larger hopes of Miss Spencer Edwards, whose Girl at a Piano is of much greater sweetness and refinement.". Helen Spanton was uncompromising and did not confine herself to subjects or a style that were thought to be more suitable for women artists.

Helen and her father were lifelong friends with the Pre-Raphaelite artist and collector Charles Fairfax Murray and his wife who often visited them at Bury St Edmunds and in London, sometimes spending Christmas with them. Their extensive correspondence, kept at the Dulwich Picture Gallery, is of particular interest as a source of information about Charles Fairfax Murray, The Pre-Raphaelites and the Victorian Art World.

Paintings by Helen Spanton are held at the Brighton Museum and Art Gallery, The Bury St Edmunds Art Gallery and the Dulwich Picture Gallery.

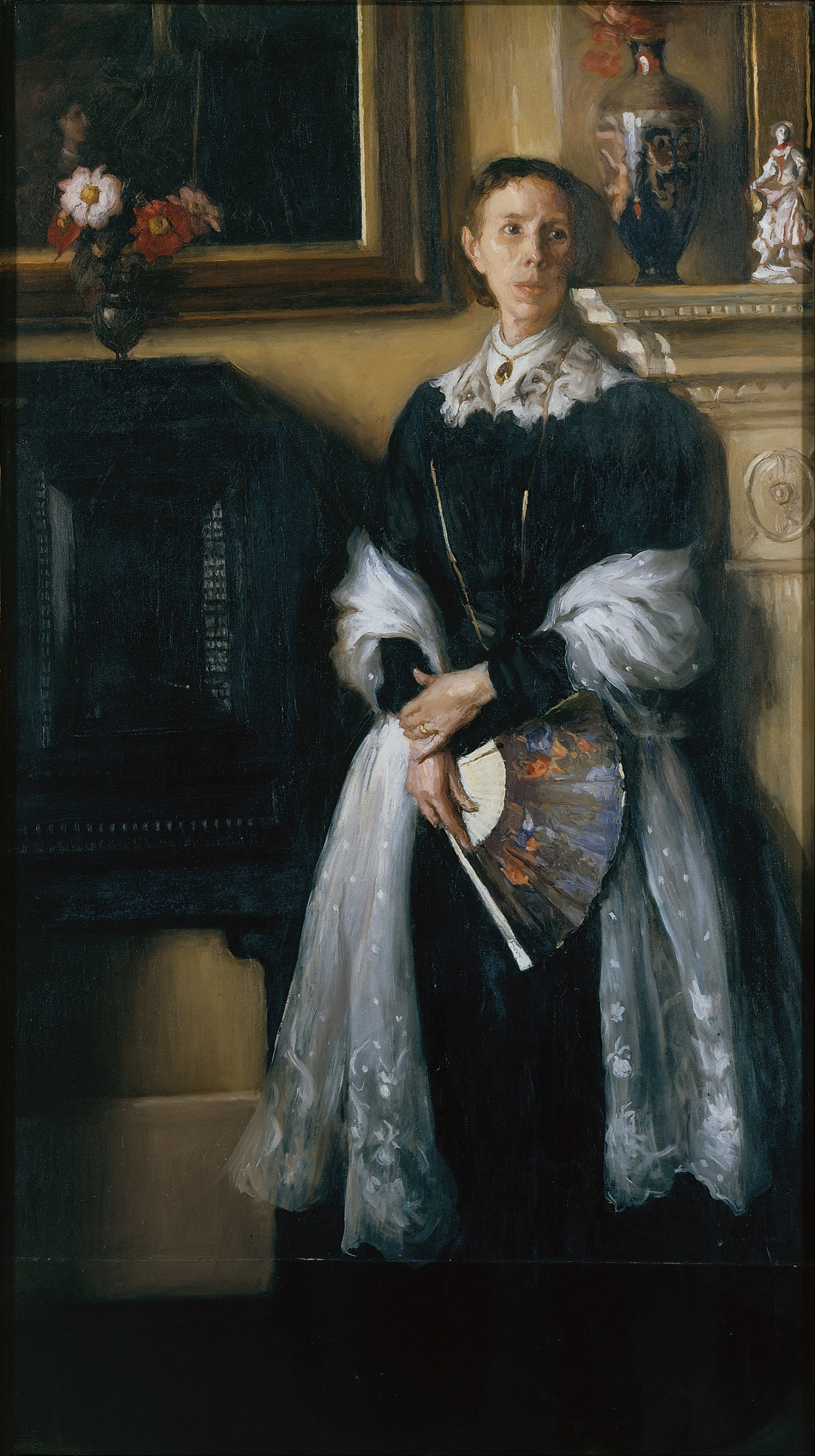
Portrait of a Lady (1901)

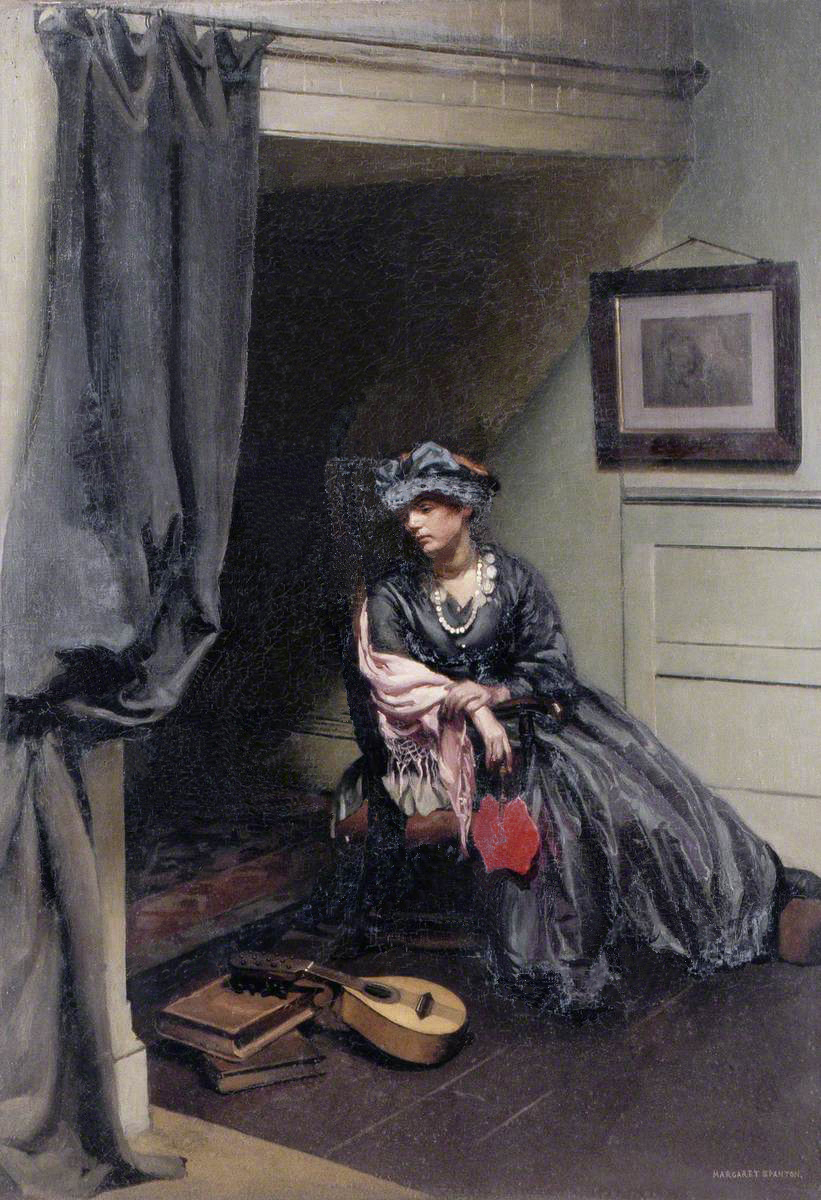
In an Alcove (1902)

William Silas Spanton (1927)

== Suffragette ==
Helen Spanton and her family were strong supporters of votes for women. They participated in the boycott of the 1911 census and on their census return wrote, "Four members of this family demand votes for women". Helen was a member of the Women's Social and Political Union, the "Suffragettes". On 9 March 1912 she was sentenced at Bow Street Magistrates’ Court to two months imprisonment with hard labour for damage to government property (breaking a window) valued at 3 shillings during protests by suffragettes in London. (Her suffragette friend Norah Yorke was sentenced on the same day to only 6 weeks hard labour; the magistrate's reason was that the hammer she used was a small one).

A Member of Parliament, Mr Chancellor, asked the Home Secretary in the House of Commons "whether he can see his way to accord the privileges of a political prisoner to Miss Helen M. Spanton", noting that the sentence was severe for a first offence. The request was refused. In common with several suffragettes who were imprisoned at the same time, Helen went on hunger strike as a protest at not being regarded as a political prisoner. On her release from Holloway prison she received the Hunger Strike Medal and "a large number of members of the Women's Social and Political Union and others" attended the Meeting at Barnet on 1 May 1912 "to welcome Miss Madge Spanton after her two month’s imprisonment in Holloway" and to hear Miss Spanton’s "excellent speech."

Imprisoned a few days before Helen Spanton was her suffragette friend and relative Katie Edith Gliddon, who had also been a student at The Slade (from 1902), and was arrested for breaking a Post Office window. Katie Gliddon had sewn pencils into her coat and kept a clandestine diary and sketchbook. She made an important record of the life of suffragettes in prison. These diaries were dedicated "'To the memory of Helen Margaret Spanton. Born at Bury St Edmunds. Died at Blackheath". Katie Gliddon was the model for In an Alcove (1902). Helen Spanton and Katie Gliddon were both related to members of the Hardy family that included numerous artists, amateur and professional.

Helen Spanton played a prominent role in several groups seeking social and political reform, including the Prison Reform Group, the Anti-vivisectionists and The League of Nations Society that campaigned for the formation of the League of Nations after the war. Her only brother Arthur, a solicitor, died at the Battle of the Somme on 1 November 1916. In later life Helen campaigned for the Council for the Preservation of Rural England and bequeathed much of her property to them (the Pechey-Spanton bequest). In 1908 Helen Spanton was elected a member of the Aristotelian Society for the study of philosophy; she often attended meetings of the Society and contributed papers.

Helen Spanton lived for many years with her father at 1 The Paragon, Blackheath in London. Her father died in a car accident at Blackheath in 1930. After his death Helen lived for a while in Appleteon-le-Moors in Yorkshire and died at her house at Blackheath on 17 September 1934. Helen Spanton, her mother Sarah and father William are buried in the family grave at Charlton Cemetery, Greenwich. Helen had a large collection of paintings, which were bequeathed to The Dulwich Picture Gallery, The Royal Academy and other galleries.
