= William Spanton =

William Spanton (1822-1870) was a pioneer of photography in Bury St Edmunds, Suffolk. He established the "Repository of Arts and West Suffolk Photographic Establishment" at 16 Abbeygate Street in the town by 1859. He continued to make a living through painting and decorating, plumbing, glazing, carving and gilding as well as painting.
