= World Challenge Expeditions =

World Challenge Expeditions Limited
- Trade name: World Challenge
- Headquarters: Beaconsfield, Buckinghamshire, United Kingdom
- Area served: United Kingdom
- Products: Travel Agent
- Owner: Travelopia, KKR
- Website: https://weareworldchallenge.com/uk

World Challenge is a for-profit company based in the United Kingdom that provides international educational travel programs for school groups. Established in 1988, the organization offers a range of expeditions, cultural immersion experiences and tours in various regions, including North America, Australia, the Middle East, Southeast Asia, and Europe. The company operates as part of Travelopia Holdings Limited and is owned by KKR.

== History ==
The origins of World Challenge trace back to 1985 when a British Army captain led a team of soldiers on a training mission in the Hindu Kush mountain range in Pakistan. Observing the impact of teamwork on the participants, he later founded World Challenge in 1988 to provide similar experiences for students.

=== Programmes/Trips ===
World Challenge offers several types of educational travel programmes, typically designed for school-aged students. These programs vary in duration and focus, incorporating aspects of leadership, cultural exchange, and environmental sustainability.

- Student-led Expeditions (1 to 4 weeks)

World Challenge's "expeditions" are designed to be student-led, with participants selecting destinations and planning activities such as treks, tours and community projects from pre-approved lists.

- Journeys (1 to 2 weeks)

The "Journey" programme is a shorter travel option that emphasizes global citizenship and cultural literacy. These trips focus on community engagement projects. Participants typically live and work within a local community while also visiting key sites in the region. Local guides, along with teachers and trip leaders, provide supervision.

- Curriculum Trips

World Challenge also offers curriculum-based educational trips. Subjects covered include French, German, History, and Geography. These programmes aim to combine academic learning with outdoor and adventure-based activities.

=== Environmental Initiatives ===
World Challenge has positioned itself as a carbon-negative student travel company. The organization states that it measures and offsets its environmental impact through annual impact reports, which assess its effect on the environment, student development, local communities, and partnered projects.

=== Funding Model ===
School children are encouraged to raise money to fund their trip through fundraising and sponsorship efforts.

== Incidents ==
Vietnam 2001: In July 2001, a 17 year old student from High Wycombe died after falling over 500m off a mountain whilst on a World Challenge expedition to Vietnam. A report commissioned by Buckinghamshire County Council found that the student fell after slipping on a tree root during a storm and her death was ruled to be an accident. Both Buckinghamshire Council and the student's parents criticised the planning and risk assessment of the climb up Mount Fansipan, Vietnam's highest peak, saying that the group leaders did not have any knowledge of the route and should have turned back when they found the route was more steep, exposed and treacherous than they had expected - something that multiple students on the trek had expressed unease about. World Challenge stated, however, that if the group leader "had known every track, it would be against the developmental process".

South Africa 2008: In July 2008, a number of students from Wootton Bassett were swept out to sea whilst playing rugby on a beach near Durban, South Africa during the "Rest and Relaxation" portion of their trip. Their 24-year-old expedition leader, Sean Foxcroft entered the water to try and save them, but despite helping save all the students, he was dragged out to sea and presumed to have drowned.

Morocco 2012: In July 2012, while trekking through the Moroccan Atlas Mountains, a 17-year-old student from Bexley collapsed as temperatures reached 40°C. No arrangements were made for an ambulance or medical transportation and instead, a minibus with no medical personnel arrived over an hour after the student's collapse to transport him to a hospital. The student died on the minibus. At an inquest into the student's death, a teacher on the expedition claimed that a World Challenge ground agent that she had called for help during the incident had later told her; "You can’t say you had a guide because I could be held responsible and I could go to prison". The inquest into the death ruled the cause as misadventure, resulting in dehydration or hyponatremia and criticised World Challenge for their inadequate emergency arrangements and providing inadequate and misleading information about fitness requirements. The students' parents also criticised the company for its lack of fitness and health checks for participants.

Ecuador 2017: In July 2017 a student at the Royal Grammar School, High Wycombe, died while white-water rafting on a World Challenge trip to Ecuador. The company then suspended all white water rafting activity while an investigation took place.

Vietnam 2019: In September 2019 a student with Type 1 diabetes died after becoming ill on a World Challenge trip to Vietnam. A coroner's inquest in the students home country of Australia heard that World Challenge staff and teachers from the student's school failed to recognise the seriousness of his condition.
