= Bring Him Home (album) =

Studio album by Alfie Boe
- Released: 27 December 2010
- Recorded: 2009/10
- Genre: Traditional pop; musical theatre
- Label: Decca Records

Alfie Boe chronology
Franz Lehar: Love was a Dream (2009)	Bring Him Home (2010)	You'll Never Walk Alone - The Collection (2011)

Bring Him Home is the fifth studio album by Alfie Boe. It was released on 27 December 2010 in the United Kingdom by Decca Records. The album peaked at number 9 on the UK Albums Chart.

== Track listing ==
No.	Title	Length
1.	"Bring Him Home"	3:40
2.	"Pure Imagination"	3:22
3.	"Come What May" (with Kerry Ellis)	4:51
4.	"Hushabye Mountain"	2:26
5.	"As If We Never Said Goodbye"	4:50
6.	"On the Street Where You Live"	3:22
7.	"Some Enchanted Evening"	3:09
8.	"The Impossible Dream" (with Matt Lucas)	2:53
9.	"If I Loved You"	2:46
10.	"Tell Me It's Not True"	3:34
11.	"If I Ruled the World"	2:23
12.	"We Have All the Time in the World"	3:21

== Chart performance ==
=== Weekly charts ===
Chart (2011)	Peak position
Scottish Albums (OCC)	9
UK Albums (OCC)	9

=== Year-end charts ===
Chart (2011)	Position
UK Albums (OCC)	44
Chart (2012)	Position
UK Albums (OCC)	160

=== Certifications ===
Region	Certification	Certified units/sales
United Kingdom (BPI)	Platinum	300,000^{^}
^{^} Shipments figures based on certification alone.

== Release history ==
Country	Date	Label	Format
United Kingdom	27 December 2010	Decca Records	Digital download; CD
