= Collabro =

British musical theatre group

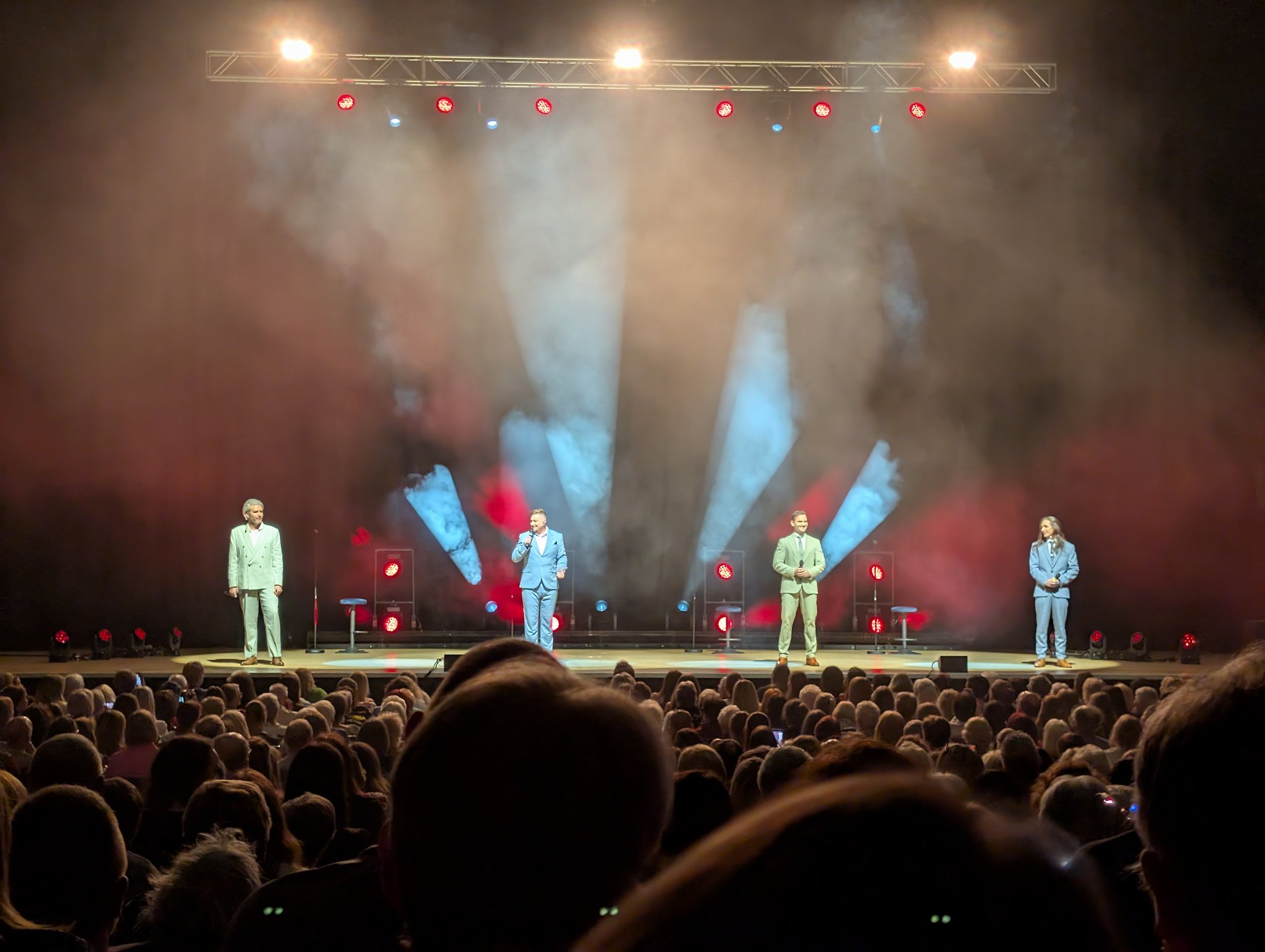
- Collabro performing at Sheffield City Hall on 7 June 2025 (L to R: Lambert, Pagan, Auger and Redgrave)

Background information
- Origin: England
- Genre: Musical theatre
- Years active: 2014–2022; 2025–present
- Label: Syco / Peak Productions
- Members: Michael Auger; Jamie Lambert; Matt Pagan; Thomas J. Redgrave
- Past members: Richard Hadfield

Collabro are a UK-based musical theatre group and winners of the eighth series of Britain's Got Talent in 2014. The group originally consisted of Michael Auger, Jamie Lambert, Matthew Pagan, Thomas J. Redgrave and Richard Hadfield, with Hadfield departing the group in June 2016. In April 2022 the group – which refers to its fans as their "Collaborators" – was voted the United Kingdom's favourite Britain's Got Talent act in the 14 series aired to that date.

Their debut album Stars, was released on 15 August 2014 and peaked at number one in the UK. Their second album Act Two, was released on 1 June 2015 and peaked at number two in the UK. Their third album Home, was released on 3 March 2017 and peaked at number seven in the UK. Their fourth album Road to the Royal Albert Hall, was released on 31 August 2018 and peaked at number nineteen in the UK. Their fifth album Love Like This, was released on 15 November 2019 and peaked at number twenty-two in the UK. On 17 August 2022, the group announced their disbandment with a Farewell Tour in December.

On 7 June 2025, the group came together at the Sheffield City Hall for an 11th Anniversary Reunion Concert, including an announcement of The Harmonies Tour of the UK in 2026.

== Career ==
=== 2014: Formation, Britain's Got Talent and Stars ===
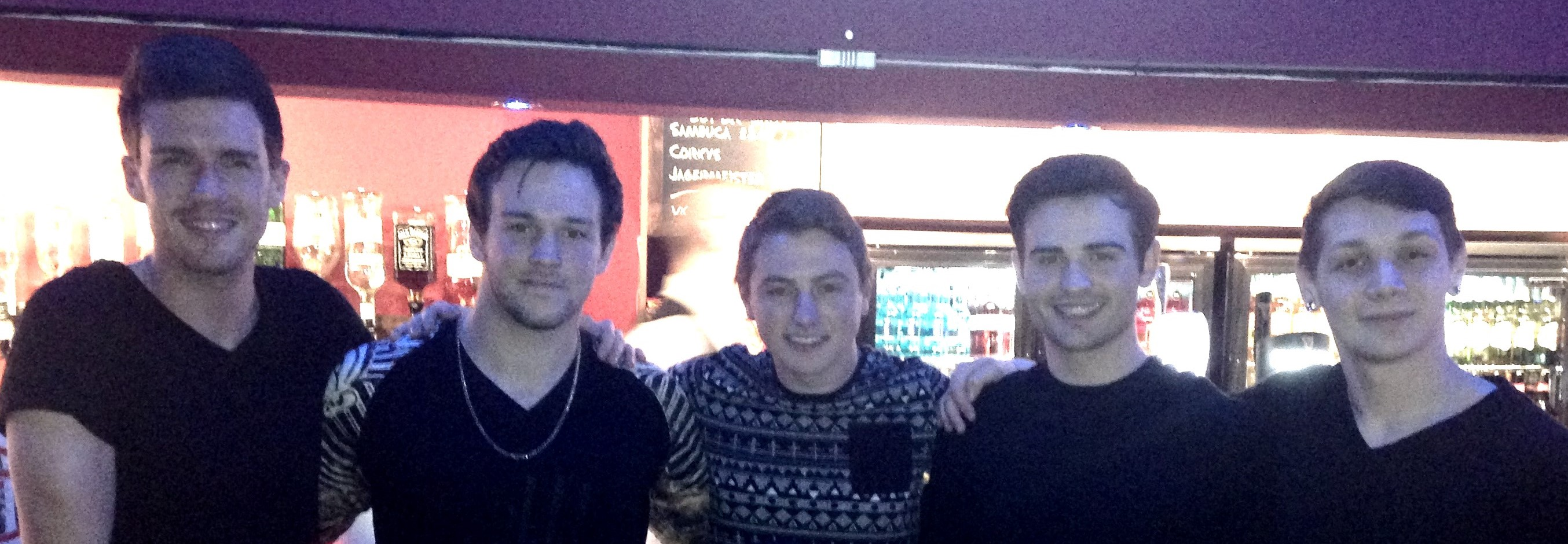
Original members- taken on 27 April 2014: Lambert, Hadfield, Pagan, Auger and Redgrave

Collabro formed in January 2014. Pagan and Lambert knew each other already, and used social media to find three additional singers to complete the band's line-up. Pagan and Lambert held auditions where they found Auger and Redgrave. They found Hadfield on YouTube singing "Bring Him Home". They sang together for the first time at the Miller pub in London Bridge. It was not long after this that they decided to audition for Britain's Got Talent, as they had 'nothing to lose'.

In February 2014, a month after forming, Collabro auditioned in London for the eighth series of Britain's Got Talent. They received a standing ovation from both the audience and judges Simon Cowell, Amanda Holden, Alesha Dixon and David Walliams for their rendition of the song "Stars" from the musical Les Misérables. The judges were initially seen to have low expectations due to their styling and the fact that they had only been together for a month at the time. Cowell claimed that "Britain really has got talent" (a comment he repeated in the live semi-final) and they received a unanimous "yes" verdict from the judging panel, with Cowell also describing their performance as a "hit record", while Holden was moved to tears. Collabro progressed to the live semi-finals. They competed in the first semi-final on 26 May, performing the song "Bring Him Home", also from Les Misérables. The performance was praised by all four judges, again receiving a standing ovation, and they received the highest number of votes from the public (receiving 62.3% of the total votes cast), ensuring their automatic progression to the final. During the live final on 7 June, Collabro performed a different arrangement of their audition song "Stars" for which they received 26.5% of the vote, winning the competition by a wide margin.

On 12 June 2014, Collabro signed a record deal with Cowell's record label, Syco Music, and released their debut album on 28 July. On 17 June, they announced that they would be going on their first ever tour, along with runner-up Lucy Kay, in 2015. The group's debut album Stars, which includes cover versions of songs such as "All of Me" and "Let It Go", was released on 18 August and debuted at number one on the UK Albums Chart. On 31 October, it was announced that the album would be re-released as a special edition. The re-released version features the seasonal "White Christmas" and "Have Yourself a Merry Little Christmas" as well as "Falling Slowly" from the musical Once and "Say Something". Collabro's debut tour 'Stars' sold 50,000 tickets culminating in a headliner show at The London Palladium.

The band quickly developed a following, who they refer to as their "Collaborators", and famous fans include Jade Thirlwall from Little Mix. In April 2022, and just days before the 15th series started broadcast, a nation wide poll voted Collabro as the United Kingdom's favourite Britain's Got Talent winners from across its first 14 series.

=== 2015–2017: Act Two, Hadfield departure and Home ===
On 22 April 2015, Collabro revealed they had signed a record deal with Sony Masterworks in the US for £1 million. The following week, they announced that their second album would be called Act Two and would be released on 1 June. It debuted at #2 in the UK Albums Chart. In 2016 the group did their second tour around the UK (Act Two) after the success of their last tour. They finished their first official tour in Japan and also been touring around the US as well as Canada.

Following the departure of Richard Hadfield from the band, Collabro announced their third album Home would be released in March 2017 having set up their own record label "Peak Productions". The band artistically controlled everything and decided to "go home to Musical Theatre" having done pop crossover tracks on their first two albums. This new offering featured a selection of stage classics, fan favourites and their first original song "Lighthouse", co-written by Ben Adams. On 20 March 2017, the band announced they would be joining Cliff Richard on his summer Just Fabulous Rock 'n' Roll Tour of the UK. Following this, their third UK Tour took place in September and December 2017, titled The Home UK Tour.

=== 2018–2019: Road to the Royal Albert Hall, Britain's Got Talent: The Champions & Love Like This ===
In August 2018, the band released their fourth studio album Road to the Royal Albert Hall. The album peaked at number nineteen on the UK Albums Chart. Following this, the band went on a fifty-one date UK tour in 2019. The tour started on 10 February in South Shields and ended on 20 April at the Royal Albert Hall in London.

In September 2019, the band took part in Britain's Got Talent: The Champions, they were eliminated at the Preliminaries, they finished third in the audience vote. The band announced that they had signed a new record deal with BMG, they also announced the release date for their new album. On their social media accounts, the band said, "After 5 incredible years together, we're proud to announce we've signed a major new record deal with @BMG. We'll be releasing our 5th album #LoveLikeThis on 15th November this year, and we're going back out on tour in 2020." In November 2019, they released their fifth studio album Love Like This. The album peaked at number twenty-two on the UK Albums Chart. In October 2019, the band announced a UK tour for October 2020. In April 2020 the band had to postponed the tour due to the COVID-19 pandemic, the tour will now take place between October and November 2021.

=== 2020–2022: Be Still My Soul, disbandment and farewell tour ===
In January 2020, the band took part in America's Got Talent: The Champions, they were eliminated at the Preliminaries. In November 2020, they released their sixth studio album Christmas Is Here. The album peaked at number eighty on the UK Albums Chart. The album includes the single "Christmas Is Here", their second original song, also co-written by Ben Adams.

The group announced on 17 August 2022 that they would part ways as a group following an upcoming farewell tour In December. The group also released their final album on 7 October titled Be Still My Soul.

=== 2025-Present: Reunion and The Harmonies tour ===
The group reunited for an 11 year anniversary show on 7 June 2025, during which they announced that they were getting back together on a more permanent basis; two days later, they announced The Harmonies tour, of UK cathedrals, in 2026.

== Other public appearances ==
On 25 April 2014, the group appeared on the ITV television program This Morning to discuss their appearance on Britain's Got Talent and they performed the song "Let It Go" on the show on 11 July. On 18 May 2014, Collabro (excluding Hadfield) appeared at the Soccer Six charity football tournament at The Valley, home ground of Charlton Athletic F.C. They made appearances on QVC and Weekend to further promote the album. They also performed at the 2014 Royal Variety Performance in front of the Royal Family, which is part of the prize for winning Britain's Got Talent. On 9 May 2015, they performed at VE Day 70: A Party to Remember in Horse Guards Parade, London. In 2016, following the departure of Richard Hadfield, Collabro were invited back to Soccer Aid - performing live on ITV to 7 million viewers for the first time as a four pieces.

== Members ==
=== Michael David Auger ===
Michael Auger (born 6 March 1990) lives in Petersfield. At the time of Collabro's BGT audition, he was working at a petrol station (his father owns a number of stations) and at Pricewaterhouse Coopers as an intern. He attended Churcher's College in Hampshire before moving to Alton College where he studied A-Levels in Maths, Further Maths, Chemistry, Biology and Geography. Later he attended the University of Bath to study Accounting and Finance. Also attended London School of Musical Theatre. Auger was a member of ‘the 100’ on BBC talent show All Together Now, alongside Geri Halliwell.

=== Jamie Alexander Lambert ===
Jamie Lambert (born 19 June 1990), was brought up in Washington, Tyne and Wear and studied at Dame Allan's School, Newcastle. At the time of Collabro's BGT audition, he was working part-time in the finance department of Barts Health NHS Trust in London. He previously worked at the South Tyneside NHS Foundation Trust of which his mother, Lorraine Lambert, is the chief executive. Lambert has performed solo at a number of events including mayoral charity events, the South Tyneside Summer Festival, and Cancer Connections in South Shields. He has also won regional talent competitions Open Zone Idol and Talent on the Tyne. He came out in the press as gay.

=== Matt Paul Pagan ===
Matthew "Matt" Pagan is from Carlisle, in Cumbria, and was working as a kitchen salesman at the time of Collabro's BGT audition.

=== Thomas Jamie Redgrave ===
Thomas J. Redgrave (born Thomas Leak on 28 August 1989 in Grimsby) is from Saltfleetby. He chose his stage surname from a theatre poster. He studied at Monks' Dyke Tennyson College and King Edward VI Grammar School. He performed in St James' Choir for seven years and was also part of the Louth Playgoers Group. At the time of Collabro's BGT audition, he was working in a Japanese restaurant. Thomas became an ambassador for The IBS Network, the UK charity working to support people living with irritable bowel syndrome, in March 2017.

=== Richard Hadfield ===
Richard Lester Hadfield (born 1 December 1993) lives in Portslade, East Sussex. At the time of Collabro's BGT audition, he was working as a labourer. He was part of Collabro between 2014 and 2016. Hadfield attended Hurstpierpoint College in West Sussex, busking during the school holidays to earn money to pay the school's fees. In June 2016 Hadfield parted ways with Collabro, stating they "wish each other continued success and support for each other's future careers." Hadfield had reportedly made the decision to leave the group after the Britain's Got Talent final. A source close to him admitted he had been "unhappy for a long time." He later auditioned for The Voice UK in 2022, but received no turns from the coaches.

== Discography ==
=== Albums ===
Title	Details	Peak chart positions								Certifications
Title	Details	UK	BEL (Fl)	IRE	NL	NZ	SCO	US Class.	US Heat.	Certifications
Stars	Released: 15 August 2014; Label: Syco Music; Format: Digital download, CD	1	28	8	33	4	2	—	15	BPI: Gold
Act Two	Released: 1 June 2015; Label: Syco Music; Format: Digital download, CD	2	31	36	84	—	2	—	18	BPI: Silver
Home	Released: 3 March 2017; Label: Peak Productions; Format: Digital download, CD	7	—	—	—	—	9	6	—	
Road to the Royal Albert Hall	Released: 31 August 2018; Label: Peak Productions; Format: Digital download, CD	19	—	—	—	—	16	4	—	
Love Like This	Released: 15 November 2019; Label: BMG Rights Management; Format: Digital download, CD	22	—	—	—	—	19	10	—	
Christmas Is Here	Released: 27 November 2020; Label: Peak Productions; Format: Digital download, CD	80	—	—	—	—	72	—	—	
Be Still My Soul	Released: 7 October 2022; Label: Peak Productions; Format: Digital download, CD	—	—	—	—	—	18	—	—	
The Return	Released: 6 November 2026; Label: Lambert Jackson; Format: Digital download, CD	—	—	—	—	—	24	—	—	
"—" denotes a recording that did not chart or was not released in that territory.

=== Singles ===
Title	Year	Album
"I Dreamed a Dream"	2015	Act Two
"Lighthouse"	2017	Home
"Christmas Is Here"	2020	Christmas Is Here
"Mistletoe and Wine" (with Cliff Richard)	2021	Non-album single
"Bridge Over Troubled Water"	2022	Be Still My Soul
"Be Still My Soul"	2022	Be Still My Soul

Preceded by Attraction	Winner of Britain's Got Talent; 2014	Succeeded by Jules O'Dwyer & Matisse
