= Wingate (surname) =

Wingate is an English surname. Notable persons with that surname include:

- Anne Wingate (1943–2021), American mystery writer
- Catherine Wingate (1858–1946), British humanitarian
- Charly Wingate (born 1978), American hip hop rapper and criminal, known under the stage name Max B
- David Wingate (basketball) (born 1963), American basketball player
- David Wingate (poet) (1828–1892), Scottish poet and miner
- David B. Wingate (born 1935), Bermudian ornithologist
- David Robert Wingate (1819–1899), American businessman, farmer and soldier
- Dick Wingate (born 1952), American music industry and digital entertainment executive
- Edmund Wingate (1596–1656), English mathematical and legal writer
- Edward Wingate (1606–1685), English politician
- Elmer Wingate (1928–2016), American football player (American football)
- George Wood Wingate (1840–1928), American lawyer, and rifle specialist
- Heath Wingate (born 1944), American football player
- Henry Travillion Wingate (born 1947), American federal judge
- James Lawton Wingate (1846–1924), Scottish painter
- Jason Wright Wingate (born 1971), American composer
- Joseph F. Wingate (1786–1845), American politician
- Josh Wingate, American actor
- Lisa Wingate (born 1965), American author
- Major Wingate (born 1983), American basketball player
- Marty Wingate, American author
- Orde Wingate (1903–1944), British army officer
- Paine Wingate (1739–1838), American preacher, farmer and statesman
- Poppy Wingate (1902-1977), British golfer, sister of Syd
- Rachel O. Wingate (c. 1901–1953), English linguist and missionary
- Reginald Wingate (1861–1953), British general and colonial administrator
- Robert Wingate (1832–1900), British civil engineer
- Ronald Wingate (1889-1978), British colonial administrator, soldier and author
- Stewart Wingate, British aviation executive
- Syd Wingate (1894-1953), British golfer, brother of Poppy

== See also ==
- Wingate baronets
- Wingate (disambiguation)
