= David Wingate =

David Wingate may refer to:

- David Wingate (basketball) (born 1963), American retired basketball player
- David Wingate (poet) (1828–1892), Scottish poet and miner
- David Robert Wingate (1819–1899), American industrialist
- David B. Wingate (1935-2026), Bermudian conservationist and naturalist
