= Governor Parsons =

Governor Parsons may refer to:

- Andrew Parsons (American politician) (1817–1855), 10th Governor of Michigan
- Arthur Parsons (1884–1966), Governor of the North-West Frontier Province in 1939
- Lewis E. Parsons (1817–1895), 19th Governor of Alabama

== See also ==
- Mike Parson (born 1955), 57th Governor of Missouri
