= Graffam =

Graffam may refer to:

- Mary Louise Graffam (1871–1921), American teacher and witness to the Armenian genocide
- Graffam Development Historic District, a residential area in Brookline, Massachusetts, United States

== See also ==
- Graffham, a village in Sussex, England
- Grafham (disambiguation)
