= Grafham =

Grafham may refer to the following places in England:

- Grafham, Cambridgeshire, a village in the county of Cambridgeshire
- Grafham, Surrey, a village in the county of Surrey

== See also ==
- Grafham Water, a reservoir in the county of Cambridgeshire
- Graffham, a village in West Sussex
- Operation Graffham, an Allied operation during World War II
