= Olaf Caroe =

British colonial administrator (1892–1981)

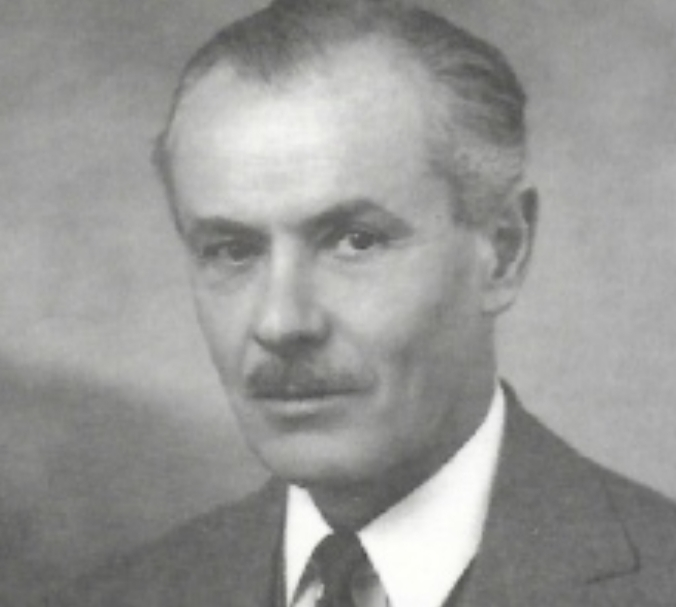
- Born: 15 November 1892; London, United Kingdom
- Died: 23 November 1981 (aged 89); Steyning, United Kingdom
- Occupations: civil servant, diplomat

Sir Olaf Kirkpatrick Kruuse Caroe, KCSI, KCIE (15 November 1892 – 23 November 1981) was an administrator in British India, working for the Indian Civil Service and the Indian Political Service. He served as the Foreign Secretary to the Government of India during the World War II and later as the Governor of the North-West Frontier Province (the frontier with Afghanistan). As Foreign Secretary, he was responsible for reviving the McMahon Line, which included the Assam Himalayan frontier (present day Arunachal Pradesh) within India. After retirement, Caroe took on the role of a strategist of the Great Game and the Cold War on the southern periphery of the Soviet Union. His ideas are believed to have been highly influential in shaping the post-War policies of Britain and the United States. Scholar Peter Brobst calls him the "quintessential master of the Great Game" and the "foremost strategic thinker of British India" in the years before independence.

== Early life ==
Born in London, Olaf Caroe was the son of architect William Douglas Caroe (1857–1938) and Grace Desborough Rendall (died 1947), a daughter of John Rendall, barrister. He was educated at Winchester College, where his maternal uncle Montague Rendall was headmaster, and entered Magdalen College, Oxford in 1911 on a demyship, where he read classics.

On the outbreak of the First World War, he joined the Royal West Surrey Regiment, rising to the rank of captain. He spent the entire war in India, where he began learning Urdu and Pashto and acquired a desire to return to the country after the war.

== Career ==
In 1919, Caroe joined the Indian Civil Service, and soon moved to the Indian Political Service. He was influential in foreign policy and rose to be the Foreign Secretary to the Government of India, serving in that role through the World War II.

When he was deputy foreign secretary, Caroe is credited with getting the Government of India to reaffirm the McMahon Line, which had been negotiated by a former Foreign Secretary Henry McMahon with Tibet in the Simla Convention of 1914. The McMahon Line ran along the crest of the Himalayan ranges east of Bhutan, and incorporated the present day Arunachal Pradesh within the territory of India. For various reasons, the Simla Convention was not operationalised until 1935, and the official publication of the treaties of the Government of India, Aitchison's Treaties, did not include it. (Note: The Simla Convention was an ambiguous trilateral treaty negotiated between Britain, Tibet and China, but it was signed only by Britain and Tibet as binding upon themselves. China declined to sign it. No action was taken to implement the treaty for roughly two decades, partly out of concerns that it was in violation of the Anglo-Russian Convention, partly out of hope that China could be persuaded to join it and otherwise due to "vagaries of bureaucratic politics".) Caroe obtained the British government's permission to revise the official Indian maps to show the McMahon Line as the new boundary and to include the Simla Convention in a revised volume of Aitchison's Treaties but to do so "unobtrusively". Caroe reissued the new volume in 1938, but still carrying the original 1929 date, and had the original volumes withdrawn. When the matter was discovered in 1963, it gave rise to accusation of a "virtual falsification" of the official records. Scholar Karunakar Gupta states that Caroe's zeal in operationalising the McMahon Line warrants it being renamed the "McMahon–Caroe Line".

Caroe took a great interest in involving native Indian officials in foreign service and training them in diplomacy. Two of Caroe's officers rose to high ranks after independence: K. P. S. Menon, who became India's ambassador to China and Soviet Union as well as foreign secretary, and A. S. B. Shah, who headed Pakistan's Political Service and later went as ambassador to Egypt.

After the war, Caroe was appointed as the Governor of the North-West Frontier Province (NWFP), on the northwest border of the Indian subcontinent, adjoining Afghanistan and Russia. He served in this role from 1946 to just before the Partition of India in 1947. Subject to accusations that he was too close to the Muslim League, he encountered opposition from Congress Party politicians, and was replaced in mid-1947 by Rob Lockhart as governor.

== Strategist ==
He wrote extensively after returning to Britain in 1947. His strategic ideas proved influential in the United States:

At about this time there were those in Washington, looking for ways to secure the oil resources and practice containment in the middle east. The formulations of Sir Olaf Caroe attracted attention and soon found favour in official circles. His article in the March 1949 number of Round Table and his 1951 book, Wells of Power, led to invitations from the state and defence departments to visit Washington.

== Works ==
- Wells of Power. London: Macmillan. 1951.
- Soviet Empire: The Turks of Central Asia and Stalinism. 1953.
  - Reprinted with an additional Introduction. London: Macmillan. 1967.
- The Pathans 550 B.C.–A.D. 1957. Macmillan and Company, London 1958
  - Reprinted with a Foreword and an Epilogue on Russia. Karachi: OUP. 1983. ISBN 0-19-577221-0.
- From Nile to Indus: Economics and Security in the Middle East. 1960.
- "The Geography and Ethnics of India's Northern Frontiers". The Geographical Journal. 126 (3). 1960.

== Bibliography ==
- Brobst, Peter John (2005), The Future of the Great Game: Sir Olaf Caroe, India's Independence, and the Defense of Asia, University of Akron Press, ISBN 9781931968102
- Brobst, Peter John (March 1998), "Kashmir 1947: Sir Olaf Caroe and the question of British 'Grand Design'", Commonwealth and Comparative Politics, 36 (1): 92–123, doi:10.1080/14662049808447762
- Hoffmann, Steven A. (1990). India and the China Crisis. University of California Press. ISBN 978-0-520-06537-6.
- Jha, Prem Shankar (1996), Kashmir, 1947: Rival Versions of History, Oxford University Press, ISBN 978-0-19-563766-3
- Marshall, Julie (2004). Britain and Tibet 1765–1947. Routledge. ISBN 978-1-134-32784-3.
- Mehra, Parshotam (February 1972), "A Forgotten Chapter in the History of the Northeast Frontier: 1914-36", The Journal of Asian Studies, 31 (2): 299–308, doi:10.2307/2052598, JSTOR 2052598, S2CID 163657025
- Meyer, Karl E.; Brysac, Shareen (2009). Tournament of Shadows: The Great Game and the Race for Empire in Central Asia. Basic Books. ISBN 978-0-7867-3678-2.
- Panigrahi, D. N. (2009), Jammu and Kashmir, the Cold War and the West, Routledge, ISBN 978-1-136-51751-8

Political offices
Preceded by Ronald Evelyn Leslie Wingate	Chief Commissioner of Balochistan; 1937–1938	Succeeded by Arthur Edward Broadbent Parsons
Preceded by Sir George Cunningham	Governor of the North-West Frontier Province; 1946–1947	Succeeded by Sir Robert Lockhart
