= Operation Royal Flush =

1944 Allied military deception during World War II

- Part of Operation Bodyguard
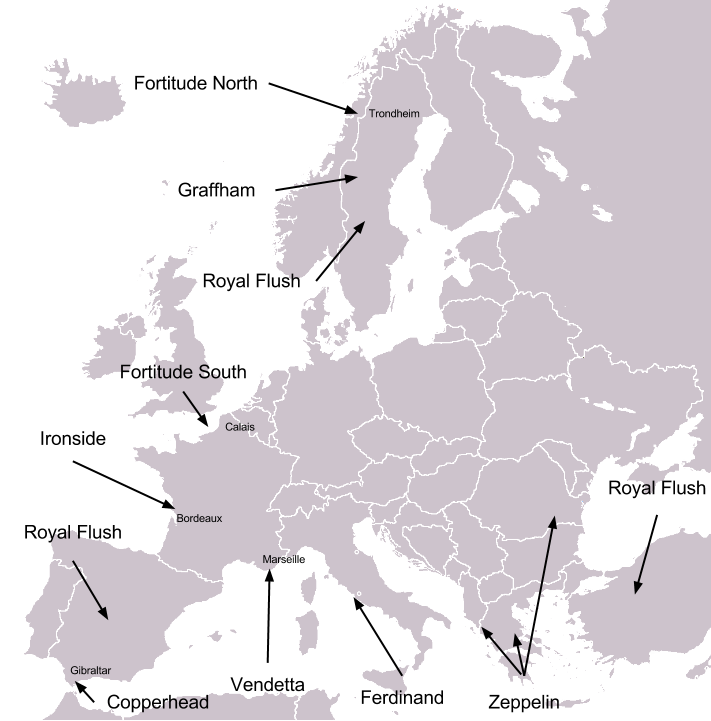
- Royal Flush formed part of Operation Bodyguard, a Europe-wide deception strategy for 1944
- Operational scope: Political Deception
- Planned: 1944
- Planned by: London Controlling Section
- Target: The Abwehr and the governments of Sweden, Spain and Turkey.
- Objective: Supporting the communication of Allied deception plans Fortitude North, Zeppelin and Vendetta
- Outcome: Limited impact, with German intelligence suspicious of reports from neutral embassies

Operation Royal Flush was a military deception employed by the Allieds during the Second World War as part of the strategic deception Operation Bodyguard. Royal Flush was a political deception that expanded on the efforts of another Bodyguard deception, Operation Graffham by emphasising the threat to Norway. It also lent support to parts of Operation Zeppelin via subtle diplomatic overtures to Spain and Turkey.

The idea was that information from the neutral countries would filter back to the Abwehr, German intelligence. Planned in April 1944 by Ronald Wingate, Royal Flush was executed throughout June by various Allied ambassadors to the neutral states. During implementation the plan was revised several times to be less extreme in its diplomatic demands. Information from neutral embassies was not well trusted by the Abwehr; as a result, Royal Flush had limited impact on German plans through 1944.

== Background ==
Operation Royal Flush formed part of Operation Bodyguard, a broad strategic military deception intended to confuse the German high command as to Allied intentions during the lead-up to the Normandy landings. Royal Flush developed a series of political misdirections in mid-1944 to support other deceptions between June and July. It evolved from Operation Graffham, a political deception aimed at Sweden between February and March 1944.

Graffham was suggested and planned by the London Controlling Section (LCS) with the aim of convincing the Swedish government that the Allies intended to invade Norway in support of Operation Fortitude North. During the war, Sweden maintained a neutral position and had relations with both Axis and Allied nations. It was therefore assumed that if Sweden believed in an imminent threat to Norway, that would be passed on to German intelligence. Graffham was envisioned as an extension of existing pressure the Allies were placing on Sweden to end its neutral stance. By increasing that pressure, the head of the LCS, Colonel John Bevan, hoped to further convince the Germans that Sweden was preparing to join the Allies.

Royal Flush was also intended to support Operation Zeppelin, the 1944 overall deception plan for the Middle Eastern Theatre. Zeppelin developed threats against Greece and southern France between February and July. Its intention was to tie up German defensive forces in the region during the period of D-Day.

== Operation ==
Royal Flush was planned in April 1944 by Ronald Wingate, deputy controller of the LCS. His theory was based on the idea that the Allied nations might rely on forms of help from neutral countries after any invasions. Having seen the implementation of Operation Graffham and with the deceptions aimed at Scandinavia and the Mediterranean, he chose Sweden, Turkey and Spain as the targets. For Sweden, that was the continuation of Graffham, with demands from the Americans, British and Soviets for the Germans to be denied access to the country after an Allied invasion of Norway. In the case of Turkey, that was built on existing pressure, which was applied from the outset of the war, to join the Allied nations.

In Turkey, the plan called for diplomatic pressure on 8 June 1944, after the Normandy landings, to allow the Allied forces access to Turkey to stage an invasion of Greece (in support of the story of Zeppelin). At the same time the Soviets would make a similar request of Bulgaria. However, it was agreed that risked a pre-emptive invasion of Turkey by German forces. Instead, the Allies took advantage of German warships being permitted in June access to Turkish territorial waters to transit to the Aegean Sea. A complaint to the Turkish government emphasised the Allies' interest in the Balkans and that they did not wish to see the Germans reinforcing the region.

On 3 June, Spain was approached by the US ambassador with a request to use Spanish ports for evacuating the wounded after landings in southern France. Originally, the plan had been to request access for the purposes of staging the initial invasion. However, that was toned down in light of historical resistance to any foreign occupation of Spanish soil, as well as the implausibility of invading France via the Pyrenees. On 5 June, the British ambassador reinforced the request, and after some discussion, the Spanish government agreed but only after an invasion had occurred and under the supervision of the Red Cross. To emphasise the change in objective, the Allies followed that up with Operation Ferdinand, which threatened an invasion in Italy.

== Impact ==
Information from neutral countries, such as those targeted by Royal Flush, had limited impact on German plans. The complaint to Turkey had a desired effect locally, with an apology from the country's government and a commitment to breaking diplomatic ties to Germany if required. However, it failed to elicit a response from Germany. The Allies' request to the Spanish government was relayed to the Germans but identified almost immediately as deception and misdirection.

In July 1944, a report by the Abwehr identified Spain and Turkey as "outspoken deception centres". To make matters worse for the Allies, the political deceptions were not as tightly controlled as the double agents. That meant that as an overall information channel. they could be confusing and disjointed.
