= Trachylepis wingati =

Scientific classification
- Kingdom: Animalia
- Phylum: Chordata
- Class: Reptilia
- Order: Squamata
- Family: Scincidae
- Genus: Trachylepis
- Species: T. wingati

Binomial name
- Trachylepis wingati (F. Werner, 1908)

Synonyms
- Mabuia wingatii F. Werner, 1908; Euprepis wingati — Mausfeld & Schmitz, 2003; Trachylepis wingati — Bauer, 2003; Mabuya wingatii — Largen & Spawls, 2010; Trachylepis (Mabuya) wingatii — Kirschey, 2016

Species of lizard

Trachylepis wingati, also known commonly as Wingate's skink, is a species of lizard in the family Scincidae. The species is indigenous to northeastern Africa.

== Etymology ==
The specific name, wingati, is in honor of Sir Reginald Wingate, who was a General in the British Army and Governor-General of Sudan.

== Geographic range ==
T. wingati is found in Ethiopia and Sudan.

== Description ==
T. wingati may attain a snout-to-vent length (SVL) of 10 cm (3.9 in). The tail is slightly longer than the SVL.

== Reproduction ==
The mode of reproduction of T. wingati is unknown.
