= Wingate =

Wingate may refer to:

== Places ==
=== New Zealand ===
- Wingate, New Zealand, a suburb of Lower Hutt

=== United Kingdom ===
- Wingate, County Durham
- Wingate Quarry, a Site of Special Scientific Interest in County Durham
- Old Wingate, County Durham
- Wingates, Bolton, Greater Manchester
- Wingate offshore gas field, North Sea

=== United States ===
- Wingate, Indiana
- Wingate, Kansas
- Wingate, Missouri
- Wingate, Brooklyn, New York
- Wingate, North Carolina
- Wingate, Maryland
- Wingate, Pennsylvania
- Wingate Sandstone, a geologic formation across the Colorado Plateau
- Wingate, Texas
- Fort Wingate, New Mexico

== People ==
- Wingate (surname), a surname (including a list of people with the name)

=== People with the given name ===
- Wingate Hayes (1823–1877), American politician and District Attorney from Rhode Island
- Wingate H. Lucas (1908–1989), American politician from Texas

== Organizations ==
- Wingate & Finchley F.C., London-based football club
- Wingate By Wyndham, a hotel chain under Wyndham Hotels & Resorts
- Wingate Institute, a sports training facility in Israel

== Education ==
- Wingate University, a private university in Wingate, North Carolina

== Other usages ==
- WinGate, computer software providing an integrated gateway management system for Microsoft Windows
- Wingate Memorial Trophy, U.S. Intercollegiate Lacrosse Association (USILA) national college lacrosse title from 1934 through 1970.
- Wingate Prize, a Jewish book award
- Wingate test, a cycle ergometer test
