= Aubrey Metcalfe =

Sir Aubrey Metcalfe
- Born: 1883
- Died: 27 September 1957

Sir Herbert Aubrey Francis Metcalfe KCIE CSI MVO (1883–1957) was an administrator in British India. He was commissioned into the Royal Munster Fusiliers in 1903 and joined the ICS in 1908. In 1917, he was commissioned a Temporary Lieutenant in the 5th Punjab Light Horse of the British Indian Army. In 1922, he was appointed Member Fourth Class of the Royal Victorian Order and was appointed a Companion of the Order of the Indian Empire (CIE) in the 1928 Birthday Honours and a CSI in 1933. In 1936, Metcalfe was knighted with the KCIE. He served as Chief Commissioner of Balochistan from 1939 to 1943.

== Titles ==
- 1883-1922: Herbert Aubrey Francis Metcalfe
- 1922-1928: Herbert Aubrey Francis Metcalfe, MVO
- 1928-1933: Herbert Aubrey Francis Metcalfe, CIE, MVO
- 1933-1936: Herbert Aubrey Francis Metcalfe, CSI, CIE, MVO
- 1936-1957: Sir Herbert Aubrey Francis Metcalfe, KCIE, CSI, MVO

Government offices
Preceded by Sir Arthur Parsons	Chief Commissioner of Balochistan; 11 August 1939 – 24 November 1943	Succeeded by Sir Rupert Hay
