= George Cunningham (civil servant) =

Scotland international rugby union player & colonial administrator

Sir George Cunningham GCIE KCSI OBE
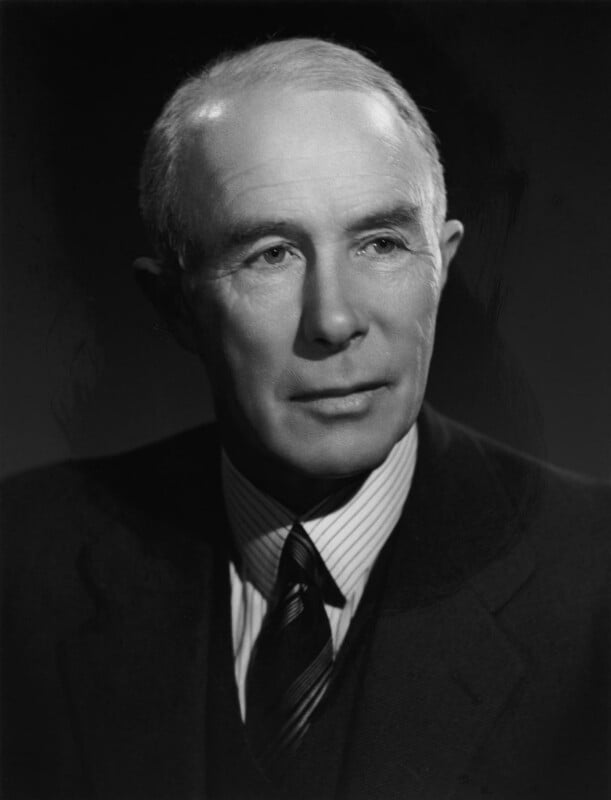
- Cunningham in 1947

Governor of the North-West Frontier Province
- In office 1937–1939
- Monarch: George VI
- Governor-General: Lord Linlithgow
- Preceded by: Sir Ralph Griffith
- Succeeded by: Sir Arthur Parsons
- In office 1939–1946
- Monarch: George VI
- Governors-General: Lord Linlithgow; The Earl Wavell
- Preceded by: Sir Arthur Parsons
- Succeeded by: Sir Olaf Caroe
- In office 15 August 1947 – 9 April 1948
- Monarch: George VI
- Governor-General: Muhammad Ali Jinnah
- Preceded by: Sir Rob Lockhart
- Succeeded by: Sir Ambrose Flux Dundas

Personal details
- Born: 23 March 1888 Broughty Ferry, Scotland
- Died: 8 December 1963 (aged 75) West Byfleet, England
- School: Fettes College
- University: Oxford University

Rugby union career
- Position: Fly-half
Amateur team(s)
Years	Team	Apps	(Points)
1907 - 1909	Oxford University RFC		
1909 - ?	London Scottish F.C.		
Provincial / State sides
Years	Team	Apps	(Points)
-	Anglo-Scots		
-	Cities District		
International career
Years	Team	Apps	(Points)
1908-09	Scotland	8	(11)

Sir George Cunningham GCIE KCSI OBE (23 March 1888 – 8 December 1963) was a civil servant in British India and later Pakistan who served as the Governor of the North-West Frontier Province (NWFP) thrice, twice during the British Raj and once after the creation of Pakistan. He tacitly witnessed his government launch an invasion of Kashmir from the frontier tribal areas adjoining the NWFP, and then oversaw it under directions from Governor-General Muhammad Ali Jinnah.

In his early years Cunningham was a notable Rugby player, serving as the captain of the Scottish national team at rugby union.

== Civil service career ==
Cunningham joined the Indian Civil Service in 1911 and was awarded an OBE in 1921, KCIE in 1935, and GCIE in 1945.

Cunningham served as the governor of the North-West Frontier Province three times, twice during the British Raj and once after the creation of the Dominion of Pakistan. After his second term ending in 1946, Cunningham returned to Britain. However, he was invited by the colonial government in July 1947 to return and resume the office at the request of Pakistan's incoming governor-general Muhammad Ali Jinnah. He is said to have agreed reluctantly, taking office on 15 August 1947.

The North-West Frontier Province was at that time governed by a ministry belonging to the Indian National Congress. Jinnah amended the operative constitution, the 1935 Government of India Act, in order to be able to dismiss the ministry. Cunningham was unsure of the constitutionality of the measure, but he went along with Jinnah's wishes. An All-India Muslim League ministry headed by Abdul Qayyum Khan Kashmiri was appointed on 23 August.

In the subsequent months, the Pakistani tribal invasion of Kashmir was carried out under the nose of Cunningham, orchestrated by the provincial premier Abdul Qayyum Khan along with the Muslim League National Guard commander Khurshid Anwar. Cunningham thought it was going to be disastrous and tried to stop it. But he fell in line after the accession of Kashmir to India, when Jinnah ordered his governors to enter into "the full spirit of the struggle". Cunningham regretted that the Pakistan government was permitting this and was evidently demoralised. His diary entry states, "I could have found half a dozen excellent grounds for resigning in the last two weeks or so, but I feel that we may be able to get the thing gradually under control again and that one must try to see it through."

== Rugby player ==
=== Amateur career ===
Cunningham came to note as a rugby player when he played for Oxford University RFC while he was a student. He was selected for the 1907 Varsity Match against Cambridge, winning the first of three sporting caps. Cunningham played at half-back, partnering Rupert Williamson, and the agility and quick thinking of both players allowed the good scrummaging play by Oxford to release the backs. Oxford won, scoring five tries to nil.

Although out of favour with the Scottish team at the end of the 1908 Home Nations, Cunningham was back in the Oxford University team in the 1908 Varsity Match. He was partnered again with Williamson, who was also made an international in 1908, after being selected for England. Cunningham and Williamson had another excellent game, and Cunningham set up Oxford's only try after he drew out the defence to allow Martin to score.

At the end of the 1909 Home Nations, Cunningham played in his final Varsity Game for Oxford. In the build-up to the match, Oxford was in good form, losing just three matches, and it was noted that Cunningham was absent from the side in each of these loses. The Varsity Game was an extremely heavy win for Oxford, and was known as "Poulton's Match", after Ronald Poulton who scored five of Oxfords' nine tries.

=== Provincial career ===
Cunningham was selected for the Anglo-Scots District side in 1906. An emphatic victory over the South of Scotland District led Cunningham to be capped for the Cities District side against a Rest of Scotland Provinces side in early 1907.

=== International career ===
The next year Cunningham was selected for the Scottish national team, and played in the 1908 Home Nations Championship whilst still a student at Oxford. His first cap was an away game to Wales at Swansea. Partnered with Louis Greig in his favoured half-back position, Cunningham ended on the losing side after a narrow 6-5 win by the Welsh. The Scottish selectors kept faith with Cunningham and Greig for the next game of the campaign, against Ireland, but both men were dropped for the final game of the tournament after a second loss.

The next season Cunningham was back in the Scotland team and played in the first game of the 1909 Home Nations Championship, again facing Wales. Cunningham scored his first international points in the game against Wales, with a penalty goal. This score was the only points for Scotland that game, and they lost 3-5. Cunningham missed the next game to Ireland, but was back in the team for the final game of the Championship, his first Calcutta Cup encounter with England. Cunningham was given the Scotland captaincy for the England match, and he spearheaded the Scotland team to a convincing win. During the England game, Cunningham converted three of the four Scottish tries.

Cunningham retained the captaincy of Scotland for the 1910 Championship, which was now known as the Five Nations Championship with the inclusion of France. Cunningham led the team in a win over France, but then was unavailable against Wales. When he returned for the Ireland game, he led his country for the third time and his third win as captain. His winning streak was broken by his final captaincy match, the final game of the 1910 campaign, against England. Cunningham played just one more match for Scotland, now playing club rugby for London Scottish, a loss to England in 1911. No longer captain, Cunningham was moved to centre, and despite one final conversion for his team, he never represented his country again.

== Bibliography ==
- Griffiths, John (1987). The Phoenix Book of International Rugby Records. London: Phoenix House. ISBN 0-460-07003-7.
- Marshall, Howard; Jordon, J.P. (1951). Oxford v Cambridge, The Story of the University Rugby Match. London: Clerke & Cockeran.
- Moore, Robin James (1987), Making the new Commonwealth, Clarendon Press, ISBN 978-0-19-820112-0

Political offices
Preceded by Sir Ralph Griffith	Governor of the North-West Frontier Province; 1937–1939	Succeeded by Sir Arthur Parsons
Preceded by Sir Arthur Parsons	2nd term 1939–1946	Succeeded by Sir Olaf Kirkpatrick Caroe
Preceded by Sir Robert Lockhart	3rd term 1947–1948	Succeeded by Sir Ambrose Dundas Flux Dundas
Academic offices
Preceded by Sir David Munro	Rector of the University of St Andrews; 1946 - 1949	Succeeded by Lord Burghley
