= Orde Wingate =

British WWII Army general (1903-1944)

Major-General Orde Wingate DSO**
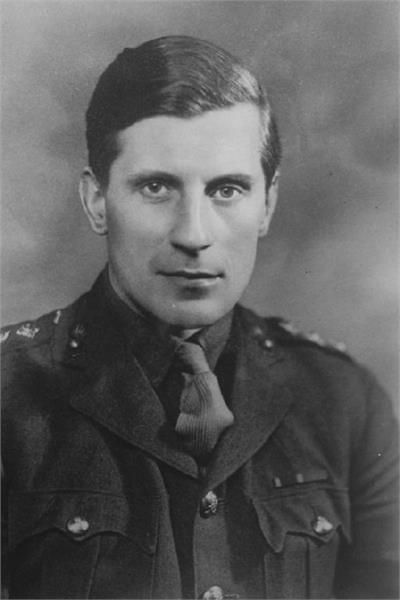
- Born: 26 February 1903; Nainital, United Provinces of Agra and Oudh, British India (now in Uttarakhand, India)
- Died: 24 March 1944 (aged 41); Near Bishnupur, Manipur State, British India (now in Manipur, India)
- Burial place: Arlington National Cemetery
- Military career
- Allegiance: United Kingdom
- Branch: British Army
- Service years: 1921–1944
- Rank: Major-general
- Service number: 27013
- Unit: Royal Artillery
- Commands: Chindits (1942–1944); Gideon Force (1940–1941)
- Conflicts: 1936–39 Arab revolt in Palestine; Second World War: East African Campaign; Burma Campaign
- Awards: Distinguished Service Order & Two Bars; Mentioned in despatches (2)"No. 35120". The London Gazette (Supplement). 28 March 1941. p. 1872. MacGregor Medal

Major-General Orde Charles Wingate, DSO & Two Bars (26 February 1903 – 24 March 1944) was a senior British Army officer.

He was a supporter of unconventional military thinking and surprise tactics. He was also a fervent Christian Zionist. In Mandatory Palestine, he set up a joint British–Jewish counter-insurgency unit called the Special Night Squads. Under the patronage of the area commander Archibald Wavell, Wingate was given increasing latitude to put his ideas into practice during the Second World War. He created units in Abyssinia and Burma.

Wingate attracted British Prime Minister Winston Churchill's attention with a self-reliant aggressive philosophy of war and was given resources to stage a large-scale operation. He became known for the Chindit deep-penetration missions in Japanese-held territory during the Burma Campaign of the Second World War. The last Chindit campaign may have determined the outcome of the Battle of Kohima, although the offensive into India by the Japanese may have occurred because Wingate's first operation had demonstrated the possibility of moving through the jungle. In practice, both Japanese and British forces suffered severe supply problems and malnutrition.

Wingate died in an aircraft accident in March 1944 along with eight others.

== Biography ==
Orde Wingate, the third of seven children, was born on 26 February 1903 at Naini Tal near Almora in Kumaon, India, into a military family (cousins of the Wingate baronets). His father, Colonel George Wingate (1852–1936), had become a committed member of the Plymouth Brethren early in his army career in India; at the age of 46, after wooing her for 20 years, he married (Mary) Ethel (1867–1943), the oldest daughter of the Orde Browne family, who were also Plymouth Brethren. His father retired from the army two years after Wingate was born.

Most of Wingate's childhood was spent in England. For the first 12 years of his life, he socialised primarily with his siblings. The seven Wingate children received a Christian education typical for that period, and time was set aside each day for studying and memorising the Scriptures.

In 1916, his family moved to Godalming where Wingate attended Charterhouse as a day boy. He did not board at the school nor did he participate in the activities of a public school education. Instead, he was kept busy at home by his parents, who encouraged their children to tackle challenging projects which fostered independent thought, initiative and self-reliance.

== Early army career ==
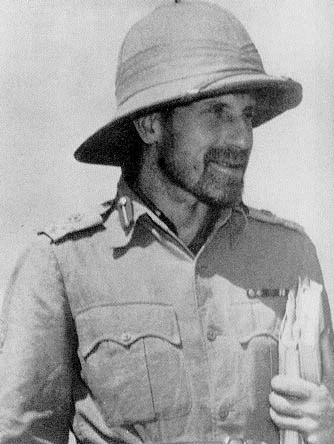
Orde Wingate

After four years, Wingate left Charterhouse and in 1921 he was accepted at the Royal Military Academy at Woolwich, the Royal Artillery's officers' training school. For committing a minor offence against the rules, a first-year student would be subjected to a ragging ritual named "running". This ritual consisted of the first-year being stripped and forced to run a gauntlet of senior students, all of whom wielded a knotted towel which was used to hit the accused on his journey along the line. On reaching the end, the first-year would then be thrown into an icy-cold cistern of water.

When it came time for Wingate to run the gauntlet for allegedly returning a horse late to the stables, he walked up to the first senior student and dared him to strike. The senior refused. Wingate moved to the next senior and did the same; he too refused. In turn, each senior declined to strike; coming to the end of the line, Wingate walked to the cistern and dived straight into the icy-cold water.

In 1923, Wingate received his Royal Artillery officer's commission and was posted to the 5th Medium Brigade at Larkhill on Salisbury Plain. During this period, he was able to indulge in his love of horse-back riding, gaining a reputation for his skill in point-to-point races and fox hunting. He was especially good at finding suitable places to cross rivers, which earned him the nickname "Otter". As it was difficult for a 1920s army officer to live on his pay, Wingate also gained a reputation as a late payer of his bills.

He was promoted to lieutenant on 29 August 1925. In 1926, Wingate was posted to the Army School of Equitation, where he excelled, much to the chagrin of the majority of the cavalry officers who found him insufferable; he frequently challenged the instructors, as a demonstration of his rebellious nature.

== Sudan, 1928–1933 ==
Wingate's father's cousin, Sir Reginald Wingate, a retired army general who had been governor-general of the Sudan and high commissioner of Egypt, influenced Wingate's career by interesting him in Middle East affairs and the study of Arabic. Wingate applied to take a course in Arabic at the School of Oriental Studies in London and passed the course, which lasted from October 1926 to March 1927, with a mark of 85/100.

In June 1927, with Cousin Rex's encouragement, Wingate obtained six months' leave in order to mount an expedition in the Sudan. Rex had suggested that he travel via Cairo and then try to obtain secondment to the Sudan Defence Force (SDF). Sending his luggage ahead of him, Wingate set off in September 1927 by bicycle, travelling first through France and Germany before making his way to Genoa via Czechoslovakia, Austria and Yugoslavia. From Genoa he took a boat to Egypt. From Cairo he travelled to Khartoum.

In April 1928, his application to transfer to the SDF came through and he was posted to the East Arab Corps, serving in the area of Roseires and Gallabat on the borders of Ethiopia, where the SDF patrolled to catch slave traders and ivory poachers. He changed the method of regular patrolling to ambushes.

In March 1930, Wingate was given command of a company of 300 soldiers with the local rank of bimbashi (major). At HQ in Khartoum, he antagonised the other officers with his aggressive and argumentative personality. He was granted the local rank of captain in the regular army on 16 April 1930.

At the end of his tour, Wingate mounted a short expedition into the Libyan desert to investigate the lost army of Cambyses, mentioned in the writings of Herodotus, and to search for the lost oasis of Zerzura. Supported by equipment from the Royal Geographical Society (the findings of the expedition were published in the Royal Geographical Magazine in April 1934) and the Sudan Survey Department, the expedition set off in January 1933. Although they did not find the oasis, Wingate saw the expedition as an opportunity to test his endurance in a very harsh physical environment, and also his organisational and leadership abilities. He concluded his service in the Sudan on 2 April 1933.

== Return to the UK, 1933–1936 ==
On his return to the UK in 1933, Wingate was posted to Bulford on Salisbury Plain and was heavily involved in retraining, as British artillery units were being mechanised. On the sea voyage from Egypt he met Lorna Moncrieff Patterson, who was 16 years old and travelling with her mother. They were married two years later, on 24 January 1935.

From 13 January 1935, Wingate was seconded to the Territorial Army as the adjutant of the 71st (West Riding) Field Brigade, a Territorial Army unit of the Royal Artillery, with the temporary rank of captain. He was promoted to the substantive rank of captain on 16 May 1936, and vacated his appointment as adjutant on 8 September.

== Palestine and the Special Night Squads ==
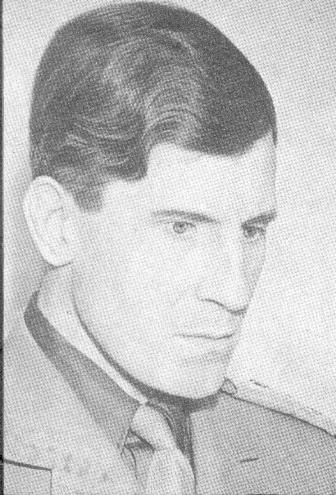
Orde Wingate in Palestine

In September 1936, Wingate was assigned to a staff officer position in Mandatory Palestine and became an intelligence officer. From his arrival he saw the creation of a Jewish State in Palestine as a religious duty and allied himself with the Jewish political leaders. Palestinian Arab guerrillas had at the time of his arrival begun a campaign of attacks against both British mandate officials and Jewish communities.

Wingate was an ardent Christian Zionist. He returned often to Kibbutz En Harod because of its association with the biblical judge Gideon who fought in this area. He conceived the idea of raising small assault units of British-led Jewish commandos armed with grenades and light infantry small arms to combat the Arab revolt. Wingate suggested this idea to Archibald Wavell, who was then commander of British forces in Palestine.

After Wavell agreed, Wingate convinced the Zionist Jewish Agency and the leadership of Hagana. In June 1938, the new British commander, General Haining, gave permission to create the Special Night Squads (SNSs), armed groups formed of British and Haganah volunteers. The Jewish Agency helped pay salaries and other costs. The SNSs were regarded as "well-oiled killing machines", while another British official called them "just thuggery really".

Wingate trained, commanded and accompanied them on their patrols. The units frequently ambushed Arab saboteurs who attacked oil pipelines of the Iraq Petroleum Company, raiding border villages the attackers had used as bases. In these raids, Wingate's men sometimes imposed severe collective punishments on the villagers. This included killing Arabs who happened to be in the village but were not involved in blowing up the pipeline. In another instance, the SNS went into a village, lined up all the male villagers and shot every eighth man.

These methods were criticised by Wingate's British superiors. Israeli novelist Yoram Kaniuk wrote about Wingate's brutality: "The operations came more frequently and became more ruthless. The Arabs complained to the British about Wingate's brutality and harsh punitive methods. Even members of the field squads complained ... that during the raids on Bedouin encampments Wingate would behave with extreme viciousness and fire mercilessly. Wingate believed in the principle of surprise in punishment, which was designed to confine the gangs to their villages. More than once he had lined rioters up in a row and shot them in cold blood. Wingate did not try to justify himself; weapons and war cannot be pure."

Wingate employed various forms of torture against the Arabs, some non-lethal. Wingate would force sand into villagers' mouths until they vomited. In one case, when Arab saboteurs had caused an oil leak, he took all the men from an Arab village and threw them into a pool of crude oil.

Wingate disliked Arabs, once shouting at Haganah fighters after a June 1938 attack on a village on the border between Mandatory Palestine and Lebanon, "I think you are all totally ignorant in your Ramat Yochanan [the training base for the Haganah] since you do not even know the elementary use of bayonets when attacking dirty Arabs: how can you put your left foot in front?" (Note: The quote is part of Amatziya Cohen's recollection of Wingate's tutelage.) But the brutal tactics proved effective in quelling the uprising, and Wingate was awarded the DSO in 1938. In September 1938, after a rebel mine killed the Jewish leader of Ein Harod settlement, Chaim Sturman, Wingate let out a "cry, more a scream than an order" and carried out a reprisal operation on the Arab quarter of Beisan, near the explosion. He ordered "the killing of every Arab discovered in the vicinity of the raid."

"Everybody into the cars!" … . We grabbed our rifles and within a few seconds were all in the cars. Without any plan of action or preparation, with Wingate at our head, we entered the Arab part of Beit Shean, which swarmed with gang members, and began to beat and trample anyone in our path. Wingate himself went out of control, entering stores and destroying whatever was in them. An hour later we returned to Ein Harod.

However, his deepening direct political involvement with the Zionist cause and an incident where he spoke publicly in favour of the formation of a Jewish state during his leave in Britain, caused his superiors in Palestine to remove him from command. Wingate was so deeply associated with political causes in Palestine that his superiors considered him compromised as an intelligence officer in the country. He was promoting his own agenda rather than that of the army or the government. In May 1939, he was transferred to Britain. Wingate became a hero of the Yishuv (the Jewish Community), and was loved by leaders such as Zvi Brenner and Moshe Dayan, who trained under him and said that Wingate had "taught us everything we know."

== Ethiopia and Gideon Force ==
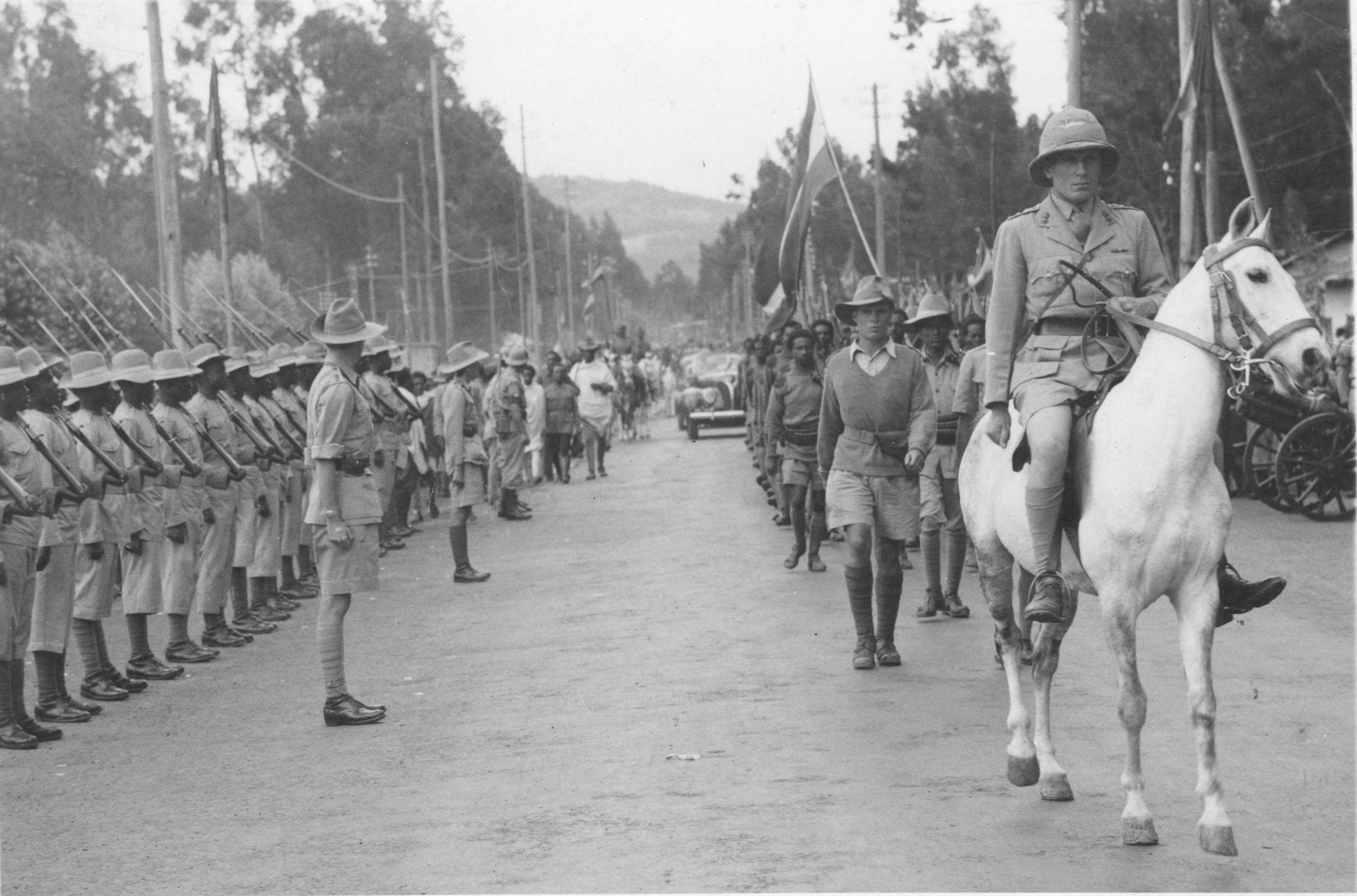
Orde Wingate enters Addis Ababa on horseback.

Wingate was the commander of an anti-aircraft unit in Britain when the Second World War began. He repeatedly made proposals to the army and government for the creation of a Jewish army in Palestine which would rule over the area and its Arab population in the name of the British. His friend Wavell was commander-in-chief of Middle East Command based in Cairo, and he invited him to Sudan to begin operations against Italian occupation forces in Ethiopia. He created Gideon Force under William Platt, the British commander in Sudan, a Special Operations Executive (SOE) force composed of British, Sudanese, and Ethiopian soldiers. At Khartoum, he and Tony Simonds joined Mission 101 controlled by London and Cairo.

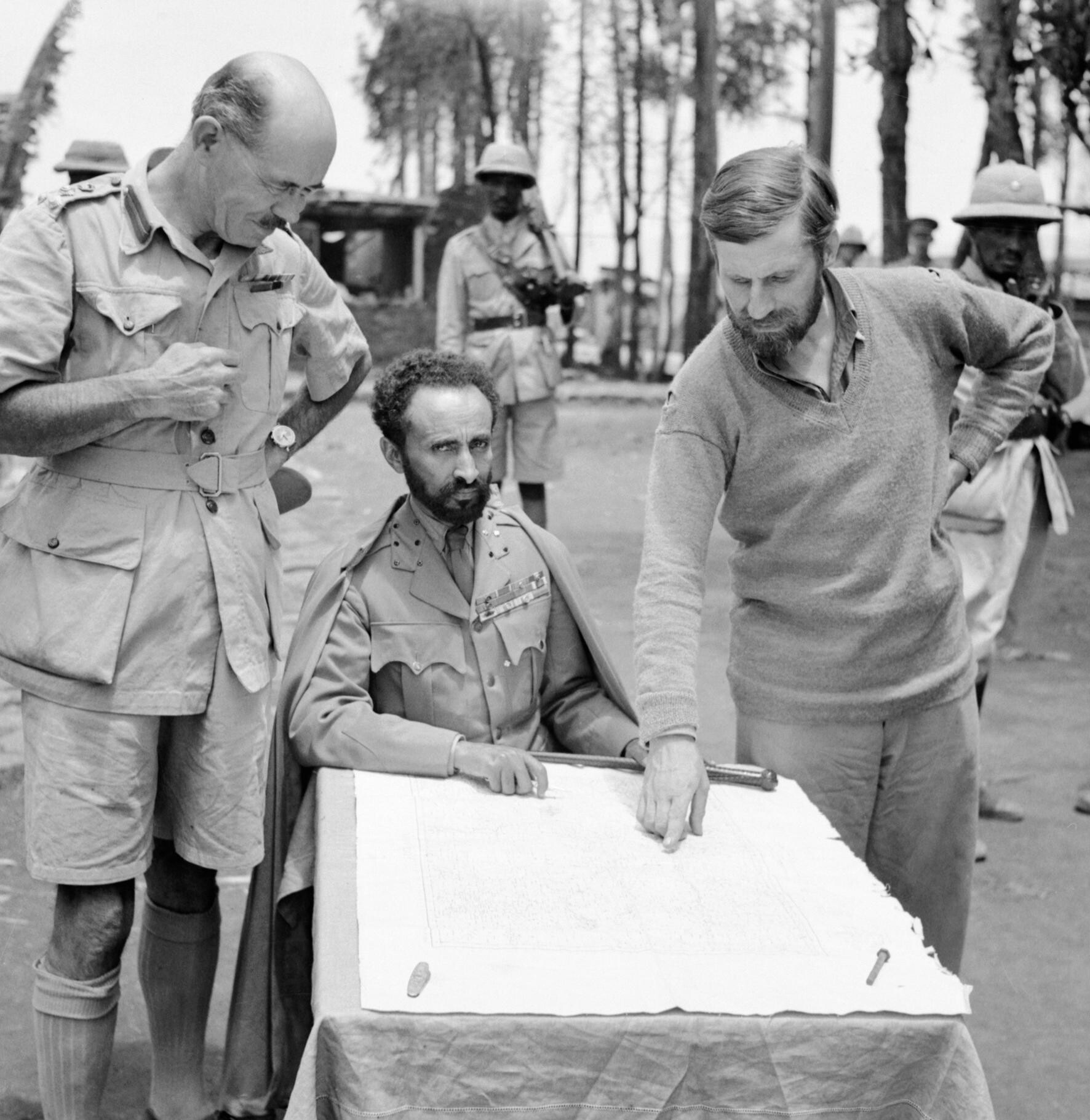
Daniel Sandford, Ethiopian Emperor Haile Selassie I, and Wingate in Dambacha Fort

Gideon force was named after the biblical judge Gideon who defeated a large force with a tiny band of men. Wingate invited a number of veterans of the Haganah SNS to join him, with the blessing of Ethiopia's Emperor Haile Selassie, and the group began to operate in February 1941. The Italians occupied Ethiopia between 1936 and 1941, and they conducted operations to "pacify" the people which killed about seven per cent of the population. There was a huge reservoir of hatred for the Italians as a result, and many Ethiopians were happy to assist Gideon Force. Wingate was temporarily promoted lieutenant colonel and put in command. He again insisted on leading from the front and accompanied his troops in the reconquest of Abyssinia.

Gideon Force harassed Italian forts and their supply lines with the aid of local resistance fighters, while regular army units took on the main Italian army. A small force of no more than 1,700 men took the surrender of about 20,000 Italians toward the end of the campaign. At the end of the fighting, Wingate and the men of Gideon Force linked with the force of Lt. Gen. Alan Cunningham which had advanced from Kenya in the south, and they accompanied the emperor in his triumphant return to Addis Ababa that May. Wingate was mentioned in dispatches in April 1941 and was awarded a bar to his DSO in December.

With the end of the East African Campaign on 4 June 1941, Wingate was removed from command of the dismantled Gideon Force and his rank reduced to that of major. During the campaign, he was irritated that British authorities ignored a request for decorations for his men. They also obstructed his efforts to obtain back pay and other compensation. He left for Cairo and wrote an official report which was extremely critical of his commanders, fellow officers, government officials, and many others. He was also angry that his efforts had not been praised by authorities and that he had been forced to leave Abyssinia without saying farewell to Emperor Selassie. He was most concerned about British attempts to stifle Ethiopian freedom, writing that attempts to raise future rebellions amongst populations must be honest ones and should appeal to justice.

Wingate contracted malaria soon after this and sought treatment from a local doctor instead of army medical staff because he was afraid that the illness would give his detractors a further excuse to undermine him. This doctor gave him a large supply of the drug Atabrine, which can produce depression as a side-effect if taken in high dosages. Wingate was already depressed by the official response to his Abyssinian command, and he was also sick with malaria; he attempted suicide by stabbing himself in the neck. Only prompt action by another officer saved him, and he was sent to Britain to recuperate.

A highly edited version of his report was passed to Winston Churchill through his political supporters in London, and Secretary of State for India Leo Amery contacted Wavell, Commander-in-Chief in India commanding the South-East Asian Theatre to enquire if there were any chance of employing Wingate in the Far East. Wingate was far from pleased with his posting as a "supernumerary major without staff grading", but he left Britain for Rangoon on 27 February 1942.

== Burma ==
=== Chindits and the first long-range jungle penetration mission ===
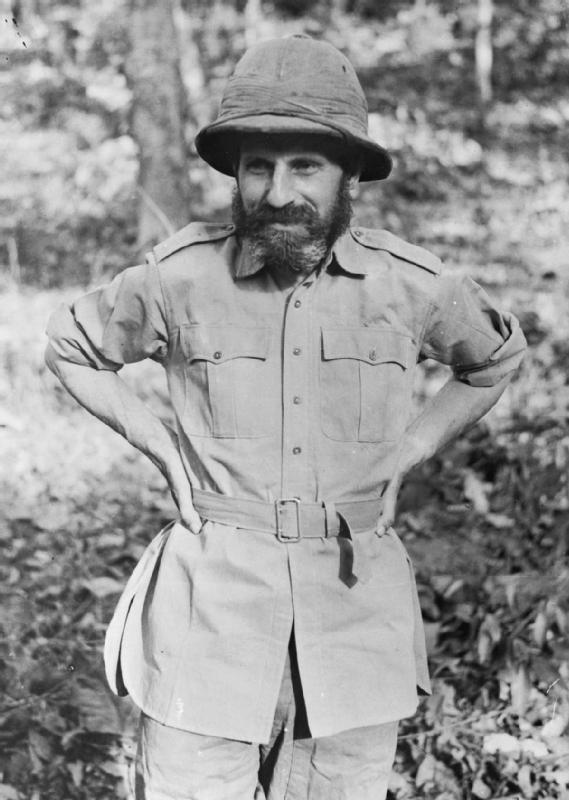
Wingate after his return from operations in Japanese-occupied Burma in 1943

Wingate was appointed colonel once more by General Wavell upon arrival in the Far East in March 1942, and he was ordered to organise guerrilla units to fight behind Japanese lines. However, the precipitate collapse of Allied defences in Burma forestalled further planning, and he flew back to India in April where he began to promote his ideas for jungle long-range penetration units. "Never ask favours", he recalled from his long association with Wavell, "but tell people if they care to help they can come along, that you yourself are going anyway".

Wavell was intrigued by Wingate's theories and gave him the (Indian) 77th Infantry Brigade, from which he created a jungle long-range penetration unit. 77 Brigade was eventually named the Chindits, a corrupted version of a mythical Burmese lion called the chinthe. By August 1942, he had set up a training centre at Dhana near Saugor district in Madhya Pradesh and attempted to toughen up the men by having them camp in the Indian jungle during the rainy season. This proved disastrous, as the result was a high sickness rate among the men. In one battalion, 70 per cent of the men went absent from duty due to illness, while a Gurkha battalion was reduced from 750 men to 500. Many of the men were replaced in September 1942 by new drafts of personnel from elsewhere in the army.

Meanwhile, he won few friends among the officer corps due to his rough manners and eccentric personal habits. He would eat raw onions because he thought that they were healthy, scrub himself with a rubber brush instead of bathing, and greet visitors to his tent while completely naked. Wavell's political connections and patronage protected him from closer scrutiny, for he admired Wingate's work in the Abyssinian campaign, but Wingate remained the regimental gadfly always ready to flout the King's Regulations; he grew a beard in the jungle and allowed his men to do the same. Nevertheless, he won plaudits by his outstanding courage and leadership in the face of the enemy.

The original 1943 Chindit operation was supposed to be a coordinated plan with the field army, but the Army's offensive into Burma was cancelled. Wingate then persuaded Wavell to let him proceed into Burma anyway, arguing the need to disrupt any Japanese attack on Sumprabum as well as to gauge the utility of long-range jungle penetration operations, and Wavell eventually gave his consent to Operation Longcloth. Wingate set out from Imphal on 12 February 1943 with the Chindits organised into eight separate columns to cross the Chindwin river. The force met with initial success in putting one of the main railways in Burma out of action, then Wingate led them deep into Burma and over the Irrawaddy River. However, they found conditions very different from what their intelligence had led them to expect. The area was dry and inhospitable and criss-crossed by motor roads which the Japanese were able to use to good effect, particularly by intercepting supply drops to the Chindits. They soon began to suffer severely from exhaustion and shortages of water and food.

On 22 March, Eastern Army HQ ordered Wingate to withdraw his units to India. He and his senior commanders considered a number of options to achieve this, but all were threatened by the fact that the Japanese would be able to focus their attention on destroying the Chindit force, having no major army offensive in progress. They finally agreed to retrace their steps to the Irrawaddy, since the Japanese would not expect this, and then disperse to make attacks on the enemy as they returned to the Chindwin. By mid-March, the Japanese had three infantry divisions chasing the Chindits, who were eventually trapped inside the bend of the Shweli River. They were unable to cross the river intact and still reach British lines, so they split into small groups to evade enemy forces. The Japanese paid great attention to preventing air resupply of Chindit columns, as well as hindering their mobility by removing boats from the Irrawaddy, Chindwin, and Mu rivers and actively patrolling the river banks. The force returned to India by various routes during the spring of 1943 in groups ranging from single individuals to whole columns: some directly, others via a roundabout route from China, and always harassed by the Japanese. Casualties were high, and the force lost approximately one-third of its total strength.

=== After-battle analysis ===
With the losses incurred during the first long-range jungle penetration operation, many officers in the British and Indian army questioned the overall value of the Chindits. The campaign had the unintended effect of convincing the Japanese that certain sections of the Burma/India Frontier were not as impassable as they previously believed, thus altering their strategic plans. As one consequence, the overall Japanese Army commander in Burma, Gen. Masakazu Kawabe, began planning a 1944 offensive into India to capture the Imphal Plain and Kohima, in order to better defend Burma from future Allied offensives.

In London, the Chindits and their exploits were viewed as a success after the long string of Allied disasters in the Far East theatre. Winston Churchill, an ardent proponent of commando operations, was, in particular, complimentary toward the Chindits and their accomplishments. The Japanese subsequently admitted that the Chindits had disrupted their plans for the first half of 1943.

As a propaganda tool, the Chindit operation was used to prove that the Japanese could be beaten and that British/Indian troops could successfully operate in the jungle against experienced Japanese forces. On his return, Wingate wrote an operations report in which he was again highly critical of the army and even some of his own officers and men. He also promoted more unorthodox ideas such as the idea that British soldiers had become weak by having too easy access to doctors in civilian life. The report was again passed through back channels by Wingate's political friends in London directly to Churchill. The Prime Minister then invited Wingate to London for talks.

Soon after Wingate arrived, Churchill decided to take him and his wife along to the Quebec Conference. (Note: British CIGS Alan Brooke was astonished at this decision. In his War Diaries, Brooke wrote after his interview with Wingate in London on 4 August: "I was very interested in meeting Wingate ... I considered that the results of his form of attacks were certainly worth backing within reason ... I provided him with all the contacts in England to obtain what he wanted, and told him that on my return from Canada I would go into the whole matter with him ... [later] to my astonishment I was informed that Winston was taking Wingate and his wife with him to Canada! It could only be as a museum piece to impress the Americans! There was no other reason to justify this move. It was sheer loss of time for Wingate and the work he had to do in England".) There, Wingate explained his ideas of deep penetration warfare to the Combined Chiefs of Staff meeting on 17 August. (Note: Brooke wrote on 17 August: "Quite a good meeting at which I produced Wingate who gave a first class talk of his ideas and of his views on the running of the Burma campaign".) Air power, radio, and recent developments in warfare would allow units to establish bases deep in enemy territory, breaching the outer defences, and extend the range of conventional forces. The leaders were impressed, and larger scale deep-penetration attacks were approved. By now, a war-substantive lieutenant-colonel and temporary brigadier, Wingate was promoted to the rank of acting major general on 18 September 1943.

=== Second long-range jungle penetration mission ===
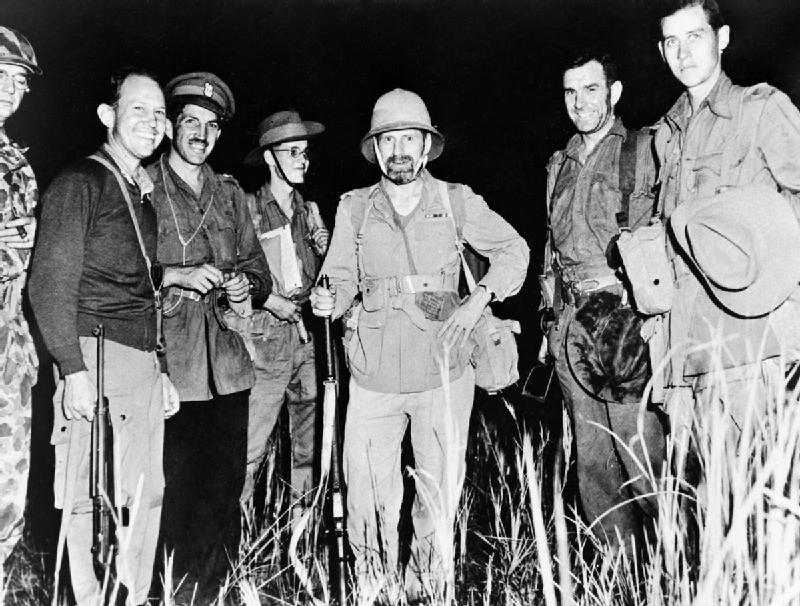
Wingate with Chindit leaders

After his meeting with Allied leaders, Wingate contracted typhoid by drinking water from a flower vase in a Cairo hotel while on his way back to India. Doctors were shocked as it was drummed into every serviceman that they should never use such a source as drinking water. His illness prevented him from taking a more active role in training of the new long-range jungle forces.

While Wingate was still in Burma, Wavell had ordered the formation of 111 Brigade, known as the "Leopards", along the lines of the 77 Brigade. He selected Brigadier Joe Lentaigne as the new commander. Wavell intended that the two brigades would operate in tandem with one engaged on operations while the other trained and prepared for the next operation. However, once back in India, Wingate was promoted to acting major general and was given six brigades. This involved breaking up the experienced 70th Division, which other commanders felt could be better used as a standard "line" division. At first, Wingate proposed to convert the entire front into one giant Chindit mission by breaking up the whole of the Fourteenth Army into Long-Range Penetration units, presumably in the expectation that the Japanese would follow them around the Burmese jungle in an effort to wipe them out. This plan was hurriedly dropped after other commanders pointed out that the Japanese Army would simply advance and seize the air bases from which Chindit forces were supplied, requiring a defensive battle and substantial troops that the Indian Army would be unable to provide.

In the end, a new long-range jungle penetration operation was planned, this time using all six of the brigades recently allocated to Wingate. The second long-range penetration mission was originally intended as a coordinated effort with a planned regular army offensive against northern Burma, but events on the ground resulted in cancellation of the army offensive, leaving the long-range penetration groups without a means of transporting all six brigades into Burma. Upon Wingate's return to India, he found that his mission had also been cancelled for lack of air transport. Wingate took the news bitterly, voicing disappointment to all who would listen, including Allied commanders such as Colonel Philip Cochran of the 1st Air Commando Group, which proved to be a blessing in disguise. Cochran told Wingate that cancelling the long-range mission was unnecessary; only a limited amount of aerial transport would be needed since, in addition to the light planes and C-47 Dakotas Wingate had counted on, Cochran explained that 1st Air Commando had 150 gliders to haul supplies: "Wingate’s dark eyes widened as Phil explained that the gliders could also move a sizable force of troops. The general immediately spread a map on the floor and planned how his Chindits, airlifted deep into the jungle, could fan out from there and fight the Japanese".

With his new glider landing option, Wingate decided to proceed into Burma anyway. The character of the 1944 operations differed from those of 1943 in that they aimed to establish fortified bases in Burma out of which the Chindits would conduct offensive patrol and blocking operations. A similar strategy would be used by the French in Indochina years later at Dien Bien Phu.

=== Operation Thursday ===
Wingate planned that part of 77 Brigade would land by glider in Burma and prepare airstrips into which 111 Brigade and the remainder of 77 Brigade would be flown by C-47 transport aircraft. Three landing sites, codenamed "Piccadilly", "Broadway" and "Chowringhee" were selected. On the evening of 5 March as Wingate, Lieutenant General Slim (the commander of Fourteenth Army), Brigadier Michael Calvert (the commander of 77 Brigade) and Cochran waited at an airfield in India for 77 Brigade to fly into "Piccadilly", an incident occurred which Wingate's critics later claimed to show his lack of firmness or balance.

Wingate had forbidden continuous reconnaissance of the landing sites to avoid compromising the security of the operation, but Cochran ordered a last-minute reconnaissance flight which showed "Piccadilly" to be completely obstructed with logs. By Slim's account, Wingate became highly emotional and insisted that the operation had been betrayed, and that the Japanese would have set up ambushes on the other two landing sites. He passed the responsibility for ordering the operation to proceed or to be cancelled to Slim.

Slim ordered that the operation was to go ahead. Wingate then ordered that 77 Brigade would fly into "Chowringhee". Both Cochran and Calvert objected, as "Chowringhee" was on the wrong side of the Irrawaddy and Cochran's pilots were not familiar with the layout. Eventually, "Broadway" was selected instead. The landings were initially a failure, as many gliders crashed en route or on "Broadway", but Calvert's brigade soon made the landing ground fit to take aircraft, and sent the success signal. It was later found that the logs on "Piccadilly" had been laid there to dry by Burmese teak loggers.

Once all the Chindit brigades (less one which remained in India) had marched or flown into Burma, they established base areas and drop zones behind Japanese lines. By fortunate timing, the Japanese launched an invasion of India around the same time. By forcing several pitched battles along their line of march, the Chindit columns were able to disrupt the Japanese offensive, diverting troops from the battles in India.

The value of Wingate's Chindits has been disputed. Field Marshal William Slim argued that special forces in general had an overall negative effect by separating the best-trained and committed troops from the main army. However, Sir Robert Thompson, a Chindit who went on to become one of "world's leading expert on countering the Mao Tse-tung technique of rural guerrilla insurgency", wrote in his autobiography that "Every time I look at the picture of General Slim and his Corps Commanders being knighted by Lord Wavell as Viceroy on the field of battle after Imphal, I see the ghost of Wingate present. He was unquestionably one of the great men of [the 20th] century".

Regarding Operation Thursday, historian Raymond Callahan, author of Churchill and His Generals argues that "Wingate’s ideas were flawed in many respects. For one thing, the Imperial Japanese Army did not have Western-style supply lines to disrupt, and tended to ignore logistics generally. When Special Force launched itself into Burma in March 1944, Wingate’s ideas, so enchantingly laid out for Churchill, rapidly proved unworkable." However, the Japanese commander, Mutaguchi Renya, later stated that Operation Thursday had a significant effect on the campaign, saying "The Chindit invasion ... had a decisive effect on these operations ... they drew off the whole of 53 Division and parts of 15 Division, one regiment of which would have turned the scales at Kohima".

== Death ==
On 24 March 1944, Wingate flew to assess the situation in three Chindit-held bases in Burma. On his return, he agreed to allow two British war correspondents' request for a lift even though the pilot protested that the plane was overloaded. Flying from Imphal to Lalaghat, the USAAF B-25 Mitchell bomber of the 1st Air Commando Group in which he was flying crashed into jungle-covered hills in the present-day state of Manipur in northeast India, killing all passengers aboard, including Wingate, who died an acting major general. In place of Wingate, Brigadier (later Lt.-Gen.) Walter Lentaigne was appointed to overall command of LRP forces. He flew out of Burma to assume command as Japanese forces began their assault on Imphal. Command of Lentaigne's 111 Brigade in Burma was assigned to Lt. Col. J. R. 'Jumbo' Morris.

== Burial ==
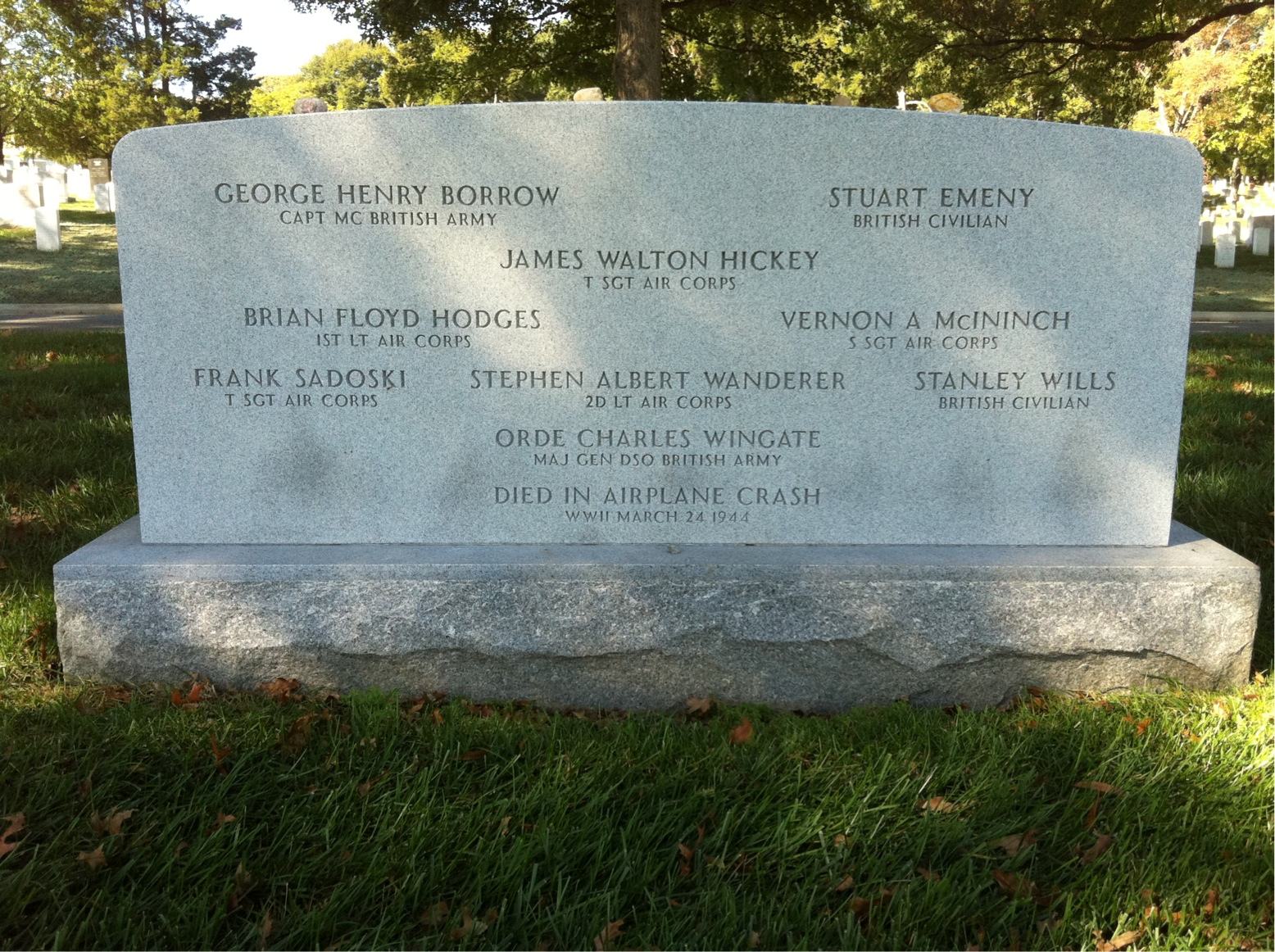
Wingate and the eight men who died with him were interred at Arlington National Cemetery on November 10, 1950.

Five of the nine killed in the crash were members of the American flight crew: Lieutenant Brian F. Hodges, Spartanburg, South Carolina; Lieutenant Stephen A. Wanderer, Hamilton, Montana; Technical Sergeant James W. Hickey, Dallas, Texas; Technical Sergeant Frank Sadoski, Freeman Spur, Illinois; and Staff Sergeant Vernon A. McIninch, Purcell, Oklahoma. The British victims were Wingate and his aide, Captain George H. Borrow, and two London war correspondents, Stuart Emeny (News Chronicle) and Stanley Wills (Daily Herald).

The remains of the crew and passengers were initially buried in a common grave close to the crash site 40 miles from Imphal, in the village of Thiulon. On April 18, 1947, The Calcutta Statesman reported that the grave had been located by the Imperial War Graves Commission and the U.S. Graves Registration Service. It was officially announced on April 30, 1947, that the remains had been taken from the original burial site and reinterred at Imphal Military Cemetery.

United States law required the repatriation of American service members killed and temporarily buried overseas during World War II. Instances in which remains could not be individually identified were difficult when multiple nationalities were involved. In January 1947 the U.S. government proposed that all remains in such cases be returned to the United States for final burial. Negotiations with the U.K. and other Commonwealth governments led to an agreement that when group burials contained a majority of British remains, final disposition would be determined by the British. If the majority of the remains were American, all remains in the group would be returned to the U.S. for burial. Prior consultation with family members was prohibited in either case.

In December 1949, the remains of Wingate and the other victims were removed from Imphal Military Cemetery. On November 10, 1950, they were buried at Arlington National Cemetery.

== Commemoration ==
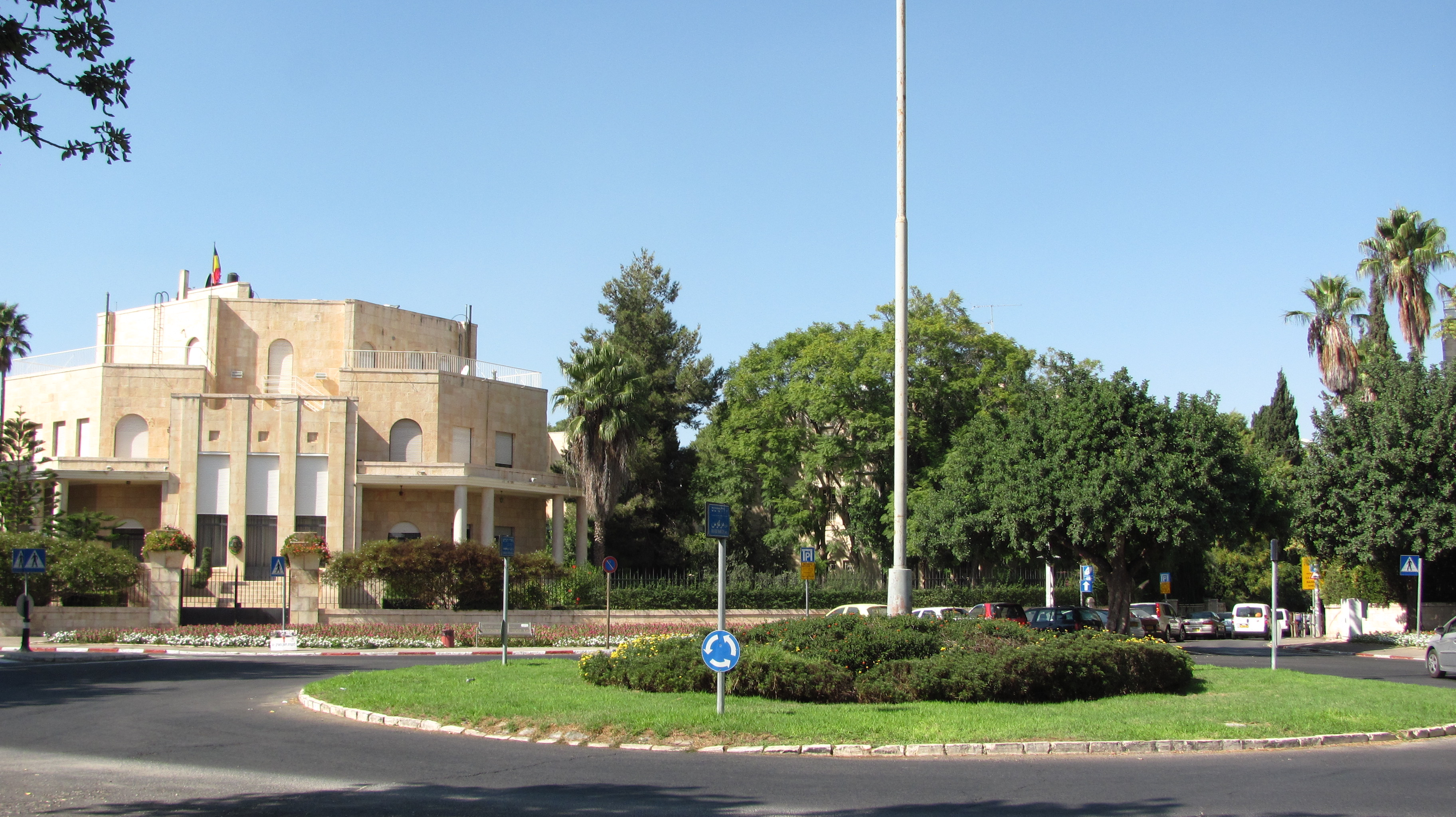
Orde Wingate Square in Jerusalem's Talbiya neighbourhood

In October 1944, Chaim Weizmann wrote to Wingate's widow, Lorna, about a proposed memorial at the Hebrew University of Jerusalem.

In a tribute to Wingate, Churchill called him "one of the most brilliant and courageous figures of the second world war ... a man of genius who might well have become also a man of destiny".

A memorial to Orde Wingate and the Chindits stands on the north side of the Victoria Embankment, near Ministry of Defence headquarters in London. The facade commemorates the Chindits and the four men awarded the Victoria Cross. The battalions that took part are listed on the sides, with non-infantry units mentioned by their parent formations. The rear of the monument is dedicated to Orde Wingate, and also mentions his contributions to the state of Israel.

To commemorate Wingate's great assistance to the Zionist cause, Israel's National Centre for Physical Education and Sport, the Wingate Institute (Machon Wingate, מכון וינגייט) was named after him. A square in the Talbiya neighbourhood of Jerusalem, Wingate Square (Kikar Wingate), also bears his name, as does the Yemin Orde youth village near Haifa. Numerous other cities and towns in Israel have streets or squares named for Wingate. A Jewish football club formed in London in 1946, Wingate Football Club was also named in his honour.

The General Wingate School, on the western city limit of Addis Ababa, Ethiopia, commemorates Orde Wingate's contribution (along with the Gideon Force and the Ethiopian Patriots) to the liberation of Ethiopia in 1941, following the defeat of the Italian forces in that country.

A memorial stone in his honour stands in Charlton Cemetery, London, where other members of the Orde Browne family are buried. There is a memorial in Charterhouse School Chapel.

Wingate Golf Club, Harare, Zimbabwe is named after the general and there are photographs of him in the Clubhouse. The club was set up to accommodate Jewish and Catholic members since The Royal Harare Golf Club in the past did not admit either.

The deep-penetration tactics pioneered by the Chindits were adopted by the Indonesian National Army during the Indonesian National Revolution against the Netherlands. As conventional defensive tactics failed to make up for the technological advantage held by the Dutch, Indonesian General A.H. Nasution ordered Indonesian units to carry out 'Wingate' actions by penetrating into enemy lines and setting up pockets of resistance during the closing stages of the revolution in 1948.

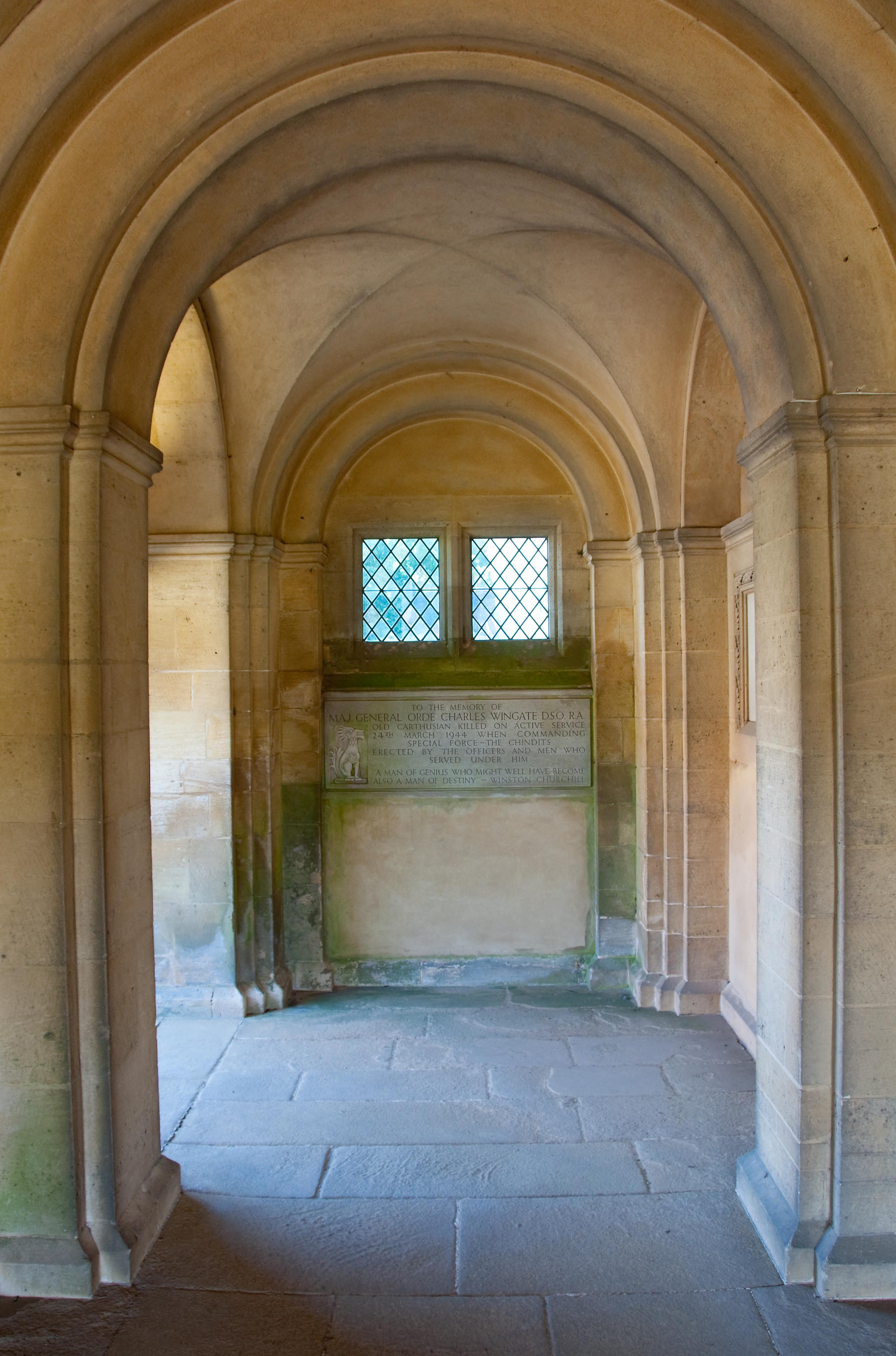
A memorial to Wingate at the New Charterhouse School Chapel

== Eccentricities ==
Wingate was known for various eccentricities. For instance, he often wore an alarm clock around his wrist, which would go off at times, and had raw onions and garlic on a string around his neck, which he would occasionally bite into as a snack (the reason he used to give for this was to ward off mosquitoes). He often went about without clothing. In Palestine, recruits were used to having him come out of the shower to give them orders, wearing nothing but a shower cap, and continuing to scrub himself with a shower brush. Sometimes Wingate would eat only grapes and onions.

Lord Moran, Winston Churchill's personal physician, wrote in his diaries that "[Wingate] seemed to me hardly sane – in medical jargon a borderline case." Likewise, referring to Churchill's meeting with Wingate in Quebec, Max Hastings wrote that, "Wingate proved a short-lived protégé: closer acquaintance caused Churchill to realise that he was too mad for high command."

Field Marshal Montgomery told Moshe Dayan in 1966 that he considered Wingate to have "been mentally unbalanced and that the best thing he ever did was to get killed in a plane crash in 1944."

== Historiography ==
Wingate's eccentric and strong-willed personality, his reputation for being difficult, advocacy of irregular warfare and his Zionism have led to sharply opposed assessments by historians. The British historian Simon Anglim called Wingate the most controversial British general of the Second World War as no other British general from that war produced such starkly polarized interpretations. The Chindit operations have been presented as either costly operations that achieved nothing or inspired operations that tied down Japanese troops that could have been used in the invasion of India. In Britain, the two opposing tendencies have been for historians to portray him either as a mentally unstable, delusional figure operating well beyond his level of competence as in official works by I.S.O. Playfair and Woodburn Kirby or alternatively as a visionary, a leader of men noted for his audacity, courage and toughness as in works by Charles Rolo, Bernard Fergusson, Wilfred Burchett, and Leonard Mosley.

Attempts to achieve a balance between the opposing views of Wingate were Orde Wingate and the Historians by Peter Mead, Wingate and the Chindits by David Rooney and Orde Wingate by Christopher Sykes. In Ethiopia, Wingate is remembered as liberator from the Italian occupation. In Israel, Wingate's role in creating and leading the SNS, which became the prototype of the Israel Defense Forces, has made him a national hero, a man celebrated for his Zionism and courage, in the words of the Israeli historian Michael Oren a "heroic, larger-than-life figure to whom the Jewish people owed a deep and enduring debt".

The two most popular Israeli books about Wingate, both written by SNS veterans, were In the Path of Fighters by Israel Carmi and Orde Wingate: His Life and Works by Avraham Akavia. By contrast, Palestinian historians portrayed Wingate very negatively as a thuggish fanatic who terrorized Palestinian villages during the Arab Revolt.

In recent years, the Israeli New Historians have taken a critical view of Wingate with Tom Segev calling him "quite mad, and perhaps a sadist, too" and a war criminal. Oren has accused Segev of maligning Wingate, arguing that Segev has "edited" accounts by contemporaries to imply that Wingate was present at incidents in Palestine when he was in London at the time.

== Family ==
Orde Wingate's wife was Lorna Paterson who was the daughter of Walter Edward Moncrieff Paterson and the violist Alice Ivy Hay. Alice Ivy Hay wrote a biography of her son-in-law titled "There was a Man of Genius : Letters to my Grandson Orde Jonathan Wingate" published in 1963. Orde Jonathan Wingate was a son born six weeks after his death. Lt Col Orde Jonathan Wingate joined the Honourable Artillery Company after a regular Army career in the Royal Artillery and became the regiment's commanding officer and later regimental colonel. He died in 2000 at the age of 56, and was survived by his wife and two daughters.

He was also related to Reginald Wingate and Ronald Wingate. The Governor of Malta, Sir William Dobbie, was his uncle. His sister was missionary and linguist Rachel O. Wingate.

== In popular culture ==
- In 1976, the BBC produced a three-part drama called Orde Wingate, based on his life, in which he was played by Barry Foster. The programme was made on a limited budget with reduced or stylised settings. It did not attempt to tell the complete story of his life, but presented key episodes in a non-linear way, mainly his time in Palestine but including Burma. Foster reprised his role as Wingate in a 1982 TV movie A Woman Called Golda.
- A fictionalised version of Wingate called "P.P. Malcolm" appears in Leon Uris's novel Exodus, while he also appears in another Leon Uris novel, The Haj. Additionally, in James Michener's The Source, a reference is made to the "Orde Wingate Forest", which is located in Israel at Mount Gilboa.
- "Wingate and Chindits" is an episode of the documentary TV series Narrow Escapes of World War II first presented in the United States on the Military Channel in 2012.
- An episode of The Real Adventures of Jonny Quest titled "AMOK" features a highly fictional take on Wingate's legacy in which his death was "a bit of a charade ... and a devilishly clever one at that". While exploring in Borneo, the Quest clan come across a mysterious valley and native village headed by Orde Wingate II, a fictionalized son of the true man. It is explained that during the course of the Second World War, Wingate had come across the valley and befriended the people indigenous to it. Finished with the war and knowing that the Allied Powers were close to winning in the Pacific, Wingate decided to lie low and live out the rest of his life peacefully in the valley, and so faked the plane crash leading to his apparent demise. In order to protect the valley from intruders, he created the identity of the Amok, a savage sloth-like, Bigfoot creature based on an Indonesian guardian spirit.
- Wingate is portrayed as a sadistic and fanatical officer in the 2025 film Palestine 36, played by Robert Aramayo.
