= Marty Wingate =

American author

- Education: University of Washington
- Occupation: Writer
- Writing career
- Language: English
- Genres: Cozy mystery, historical fiction
- Website: martywingate.com

Marty Wingate is an American author of cozy mystery novels and historical fiction, all set in Britain. She previously worked as a how-to gardening writer and journalist. She lives near Seattle, Washington, with her husband.

== Early career and background ==
Wingate is a Seattle native. She holds a master's degree from the University of Washington. Early in her career she worked as a chef and writer associated with the Seattle Post-Intelligencer. She established herself as a gardening expert, publishing magazine and newspaper articles on horticultural topics and leading garden tours in North America, England, Scotland, and Ireland. She is a member of the Royal Horticultural Society.

Her non-fiction gardening books include:

- Big Ideas for Northwest Small Gardens (2003)
- The Big Book of Northwest Perennials (2005)
- The Bellevue Botanical Garden (2007)
- Landscaping for Privacy (2011)
- Perennials for the Pacific Northwest (2013)

=== Fiction career ===
Wingate transitioned to fiction, drawing on her love of Britain, gardens, birds, and history. She is a member of Sisters in Crime, Mystery Writers of America, and the Crime Writers’ Association (UK). She conducts on-the-ground research during regular trips to England and Scotland.

=== Mystery series ===
- Potting Shed Mysteries: Features Pru Parke, a middle-aged American gardener from Texas who moves to England.
  - The Garden Plot (2014)
  - The Red Book of Primrose House (2014)
  - Between a Rock and a Hard Place (2015)
  - The Skeleton Garden (2016)
  - The Bluebonnet Betrayal (2016)
  - Best-Laid Plants (2017)
  - Midsummer Mayhem (2018)
  - Christmas at Greenoak (2019)
  - and Bittersweet Herbs (2021).
- Birds of a Feather Mysteries: Centers on Julia Lanchester, who manages a tourist information center in a Suffolk village.
  - The Rhyme of the Magpie (2015)
  - Empty Nest (2015)
  - Every Trick in the Rook (2017)
  - Farewell, My Cuckoo (2018).
- First Edition Library Mysteries: Set in Bath and featuring Hayley Burke, curator of a collection of Golden Age mystery books.
  - The Bodies in the Library (2019)
  - Murder Is a Must (2020)
  - The Librarian Always Rings Twice (2022).
- London Ladies’ Murder Club: A historical cozy series set in 1921 London, inspired by the real-life Useful Women agency. It follows Mabel Canning.
  - A Body on the Doorstep (2024)
  - A Body at the Seance (2024)
  - A Body at the Dance Hall (2024)
  - Murder of a Suffragette (2024).

=== Historical fiction ===
- Glamour Girls (2021; about a female Spitfire pilot in World War II)
- The Orphans of Mersea House (2022; set in 1957 Suffolk)
- The House for Lost Children (2025; World War II-era country house in Suffolk involving orphaned evacuees)
- The German Sisters (2026; involving Kindertransport children)
