= Catherine Wingate =

British humanitarian (1858–1946)

Lady Wingate DBE
- Born: Catherine Leslie Rundle; 26 October 1858
- Died: 10 June 1946 (aged 87); Knockenhair, Dunbar, East Lothian, Scotland
- Known for: President of the Cairo and Alexandria Red Cross Committee
- Spouse: Sir Reginald Wingate (m. 1888)
- Relatives: General Sir Leslie Rundle (brother); Ronald Evelyn Leslie Wingate (son)

Dame Catherine Leslie Wingate DBE (née Rundle; 26 October 1858 – 10 June 1946) was a British humanitarian and social activist.

She was the daughter of Captain Joseph Sparkhall Rundle of the Royal Navy and his wife Renira Catherine (née Leslie), who was the daughter of Commander W. W. Leslie of the Royal Navy. Her brother was General Sir Leslie Rundle. On 18 June 1888, she married Reginald Wingate (later Sir Reginald Wingate), a Royal Artillery officer at the time.

The couple had five children:

- Sir Ronald Evelyn Leslie Wingate, 2nd Baronet (30 September 1889 – 31 August 1978)
- Graham Andrew Leslie Wingate (27 August 1892 – 11 September 1892)
- Malcolm Roy Wingate (28 August 1893 – 21 March 1918)
- Lucy Elizabeth Leslie Wingate (1896–1978)
- Victoria Alexandrina Catherine Wingate (1899–1989)

During the First World War, Lady Wingate was president of the Cairo and Alexandria Red Cross Committee and of the Empire Nurses' Red Cross Clubs in the two cities, and for these services she was appointed Dame Commander of the Order of the British Empire (DBE) in the 1920 civilian war honours.

== Sources ==
- Obituary, The Times, 11 June 1946
- Biography of Sir Reginald Wingate, Oxford Dictionary of National Biography
