= Arthur Parsons =

British Indian Army officer

Major-General Sir Arthur Edward Broadbent Parsons KCIE CBE DSO (1884–1966) was a British Indian Army officer and administrator in British India. He was commissioned into the Oxfordshire Volunteer Light Infantry as an acting second lieutenant in 1904, and was given a full second lieutenancy in 1906. He was appointed an Officer of the Order of the British Empire (OBE) in 1920 for "valuable services rendered in the field in the Afghan War, 1919". He was promoted to lieutenant in 1909 and to captain in 1915. He was a major by 1923, in which year he was awarded the Distinguished Service Order (DSO) "for distinguished service in the field with the Waziristan Force". He was promoted to Commander of the Order of the British Empire (CBE) in the 1927 Birthday Honours and was appointed a Knight Commander of the Order of the Indian Empire (KCIE) in the 1938 Birthday Honours, by which time he was a lieutenant-colonel. He served as governor of the North-West Frontier Province in 1939.

Political offices
Preceded by Ronald Wingate	Chief Commissioner of Balochistan; 1936–1937	Succeeded by Ronald Wingate
Preceded by Olaf Kirkpatrick Caroe	Chief Commissioner of Balochistan; 1938–1939	Succeeded by Sir Herbert Aubrey Francis Metcalfe
Preceded by Sir George Cunningham	Governor of the North-West Frontier Province; 1939	Succeeded by Sir George Cunningham
