= Ronald Wingate =

British colonial administrator (1889–1978)

Sir Ronald Wingate Bt CB CMG CIE OBE
- Born: 30 September 1889; Kensington, London, England.
- Died: 31 August 1978 (aged 88)
- Education: Bradfield College
- Alma mater: Bradfield College; Balliol College, Oxford
- Known for: Consul to Oman; Chief Commissioner of Baluchistan; Deputy Controller of the London Controlling Section; Delegate to the Tripartite Gold Commission
- Spouse: Mary Harpoth Vinogradoff
- Parents: Reginald Wingate (father); Catherine Rundle (mother)
- Relatives: Leslie Rundle (uncle); Lawrence of Arabia (cousin); Orde Wingate (cousin)

Sir Ronald Evelyn Leslie Wingate, 2nd Baronet, CB, CMG, CIE, OBE (30 September 1889 – 31 August 1978) was a British colonial administrator, soldier and author. Wingate was born in 1889 in Kensington, London, and educated at Bradfield College and Balliol College, Oxford before entering the Indian Civil Service. In the Civil Service, he served as an Assistant Commissioner in Punjab and the city magistrate of Delhi.

During the First World War, Wingate was given a special assignment with the Mesopotamian Expeditionary Force as an assistant political officer. After the war, he served as British Consul in Muscat, Oman, and helped to negotiate the Treaty of Seeb. He then briefly served in Kashmir before returning to Oman. After his second tour in Oman, Wingate held a variety of positions in British India, including service as the Acting Secretary of the Foreign and Political Department of the Indian Government and Commissioner of Baluchistan.

At the outbreak of the Second World War, Wingate served with the Ministry of Economic Warfare in Africa and Southeast Asia. Then, in 1942, he joined the London Controlling Section (LCS), an organization within the War Cabinet devoted to military deception. Wingate became the Deputy Controller of the LCS in 1943 and helped to form numerous deception plans including Plan Jael, later called Operation Bodyguard. At the conclusion of the war, he was chosen to write the official history of Allied deception operations during it.

After the war, Wingate served as the British delegate on the Tripartite Commission for the Restitution of Monetary Gold and as a director on the board of the Imperial Continental Gas Association. He also wrote three books: Wingate of the Sudan, a biography of his father, Reginald Wingate; Not in the Limelight, his own memoirs; and Lord Ismay, a biography of General Hastings Ismay. Wingate died on 31 August 1978 at the age of 88.

== Early life ==
Reginald Wingate, Ronald Wingate's father

Wingate was the son of Reginald Wingate, a British general who held important positions in Egypt and Sudan, and his wife Catherine Wingate. Wingate was also a cousin of Lawrence of Arabia and a second cousin of Orde Wingate. Wingate spent his early childhood in Cairo with his family, but in 1889 he was sent to live in England and enter school. From a very young age, he hoped to follow his father into military service, and he began his education at Bradfield College planning to join the Royal Navy. While at Bradfield; however, Wingate discovered that he could not pass the Navy's medical exam because he was severely near-sighted and decided to instead pursue a civil service career.

Wingate left Bradfield and entered Balliol College, Oxford, where he went to receive an MA. While at Oxford, Wingate hoped for a career in the Foreign Office, but his father convinced him that a posting abroad would be more favorable financially. Thus, in 1912, Wingate passed the civil service examinations and entered the Indian Civil Service (ICS). He was immediately sent back to Oxford, where he spent a year studying Urdu and Persian. During the Christmas holiday of his year at Oxford, Wingate visited his father in Khartoum and met Mary Harpoth Vinogradoff, the step-daughter of Paul Vinogradoff, a prominent scholar at the University of Oxford. In his memoirs, Wingate described their encounter as "love at first sight", and the two were engaged six months later before Wingate left for his first posting in India.

In 1913, Wingate began his ICS career as an Assistant Commissioner in Punjab, posted in Sialkot. Wingate "worked ceaselessly" at the various tasks of administration during the period, but enjoyed his duties. In 1916, Mary Harpoth visited Wingate in India and the two were married in Lahore on November 11. After a honeymoon in the Kangra Valley, Wingate returned to work, becoming an aide de camp and assistant private secretary for the Governor of Punjab, and then the city magistrate of Delhi.

== First World War ==
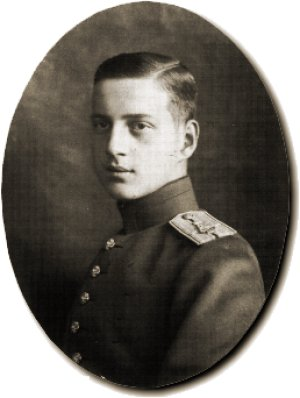
Grand Duke Dmitri Pavlovich of Russia, one of Wingate's guests in Najaf

At the beginning of the First World War, Wingate immediately volunteered to serve in Europe, but like most other members of the ICS, he was turned down. After the entry of the Ottoman Empire into the war, Wingate hoped that his Arabic language skills would result in a posting with the army, but he remained in India until 1917. In June 1917, after only a year in Delhi, Wingate joined the Mesopotamian Expeditionary Force as an assistant political officer. As a political officer, Wingate initially took part in administrative tasks, helping to rebuild a political system in areas conquered by the British. Wingate first worked to re-establish a customs system in liberated territories. He then led the team of political officers in Najaf, where he worked to establish a police force and establish a basic system of taxation. Wingate also was responsible for entertaining notable Western guests who passed through Najaf, including Grand Duke Dmitri Pavlovich of Russia. During the war, Wingate also helped to negotiate British protectorates for the Gulf States.

In addition to his work in traditional political matters, Wingate worked with Percy Cox, Gertrude Bell and other British agents on several special operations. Most notably, he helped to bribe a Turkish army officer who had cut off a British force near Kut and helped keep the Ottomans out of Najaf. Wingate also helped to foil a plot by the Committee of Union and Progress (CUP) to promote an uprising in Najaf by ordering one of his aides to get the CUP agent drunk, leading him to reveal the details of the plot.

== First term as Consul to Oman ==
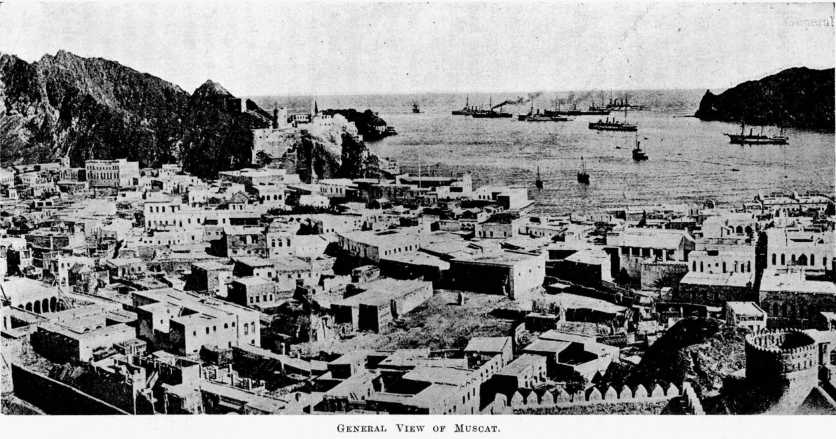
Muscat during the First World War

After the war, in 1919, Wingate was appointed British Consul in Muscat, the capital of Oman. When Wingate arrived in Oman, the country was in a state of turmoil due to a long-standing power struggle between the Imamate of Oman and the Sultan of Oman. The tribesmen in the interior of Oman, who supported the Imam, sought the overthrow of the Sultan, who was kept in power in the coastal regions through British intervention. Upon assuming his position, Wingate was charged with negotiating a peace between the two groups that would ensure the power of the Sultan and prevent the outbreak of open warfare.

Wingate initially found the Sultan, Taimur bin Feisal, uncooperative in efforts to reach a settlement. After years trapped in Muscat with no power over the majority of his country, Feisal saw no reason to continue the struggle and told Wingate that "he wished to abdicate and be guaranteed some small pension which would enable him at least to live in peace somewhere outside Muscat and Arabia." Knowing that the Sultan's support would be key to any plan, Wingate arranged for the Sultan to make a long state visit to the Viceroy of India, staying in a villa in the Himalayas. Before Feisal departed, Wingate established a Council of Ministers, nominally to advise the Sultan, but actually designed to hold the effective power during his absence. The sultan also gave Wingate the power to negotiate with the Imam on his behalf.

Having acquired the power to negotiate with the Imam and the tribesmen, Wingate needed to reassert the power of the Sultanate and find some leverage to force the Imam into negotiations. He began by collecting unpaid customs duties in order to raise more revenue for the Sultan, and sent emissaries to Isa Bin Salih, the Imam's chief deputy. Wingate's initial overtures proved unsuccessful, so he threatened to impose a "punitive tax" on dates, the chief export crop of Oman. Because the Sultan controlled the ports and coastal areas, he had the power to collect such a tax, which would have ruined the Omani farmers. After the imposition of the tax, riots erupted in the interior, and the Imam was murdered by angry farmers. A new Imam, who was more willing to negotiate, was selected and requested a meeting with Wingate.

Wingate agreed to the negotiations, and scheduled a meeting at the coastal town of As Sib in late September. The first two days of the meeting went well, and both sides reached a general agreement that the Imam and tribal leaders would not interfere with the Sultan's rule in the coastal areas if the Sultan would not interfere in the interior. Wingate also promised that upon the conclusion of an agreement, the tax on dates would be reduced to five percent. On the third day, however, trouble arose when the tribal leaders insisted that the Imam be formally acknowledged as a ruler equal to the Sultan and as a religious leader in the text of the agreement. Wingate, however, convinced the tribal leaders that the Imam should sign the agreement only in his capacity as a representative of the Omani tribes. Although the agreement became known as the Treaty of Sib, it was not in fact a treaty at all, but rather "an agreement between the Sultan and his subjects" as the sovereignty of the Sultan in all external affairs was recognized. Though the Treaty of Sib was a "bitter blow" to the Sultan, it led to an unprecedented thirty years of peace in the interior of Oman. The agreement was also well received in Britain and India, and Wingate received congratulatory telegrams from the Viceroy of India and the Secretary of State for India.

== Kashmir and second term in Oman ==
In July 1921, Wingate contracted malaria and was given six weeks of medical leave, which he decided to spend in Kashmir. While in Kashmir, Wingate visited Joe Windham, the British Resident, who offered to find him a job in India. Wingate went back to Oman, but returned to Kashmir in November as a special assistant to the Resident.

In Kashmir, Wingate first served in Poonch, but the post of Assistant Resident in Poonch was abolished in December. Wingate then was moved to an assignment in Srinagar. Srinagar was the site of a large club for British military officers and civil servants, and Wingate, finding that he had "a minimum of work", spent much of his time socializing and playing golf. In January 1923, Wingate was ordered back to Oman to serve as Consul a second time.

Wingate's second term as consul was relatively uneventful and lasted only until October when he again contracted malaria. The only major event came when the citizens of the town of Sur refused to pay their customs duties. In order to coerce the town into payment, Wingate sent a detachment of 50 soldiers with machine guns to the town. Under the cover of darkness, the soldiers landed on the narrow spit of land connecting Sur to the mainland, cutting the town off from its water supply. The people of the town made no attempt to resist militarily and after two days without water, they paid the customs dues.

== Rajputana and Baluchistan ==
Wingate left Oman after contracting malaria in October and returned to England for medical care. After several weeks in a nursing home, Wingate had recovered sufficiently to visit St. Moritz for New Years, but he spent nearly a year on leave much of it golfing at Muirfield. Then, in September 1924, he returned to India to serve as secretary to the agent of the Governor-General of Rajputana, the chief British official in Rajputana. In that capacity, Wingate accompanied the agent on all of his state visits, and encountered for the first time what he considered "real India," rather than the frontier regions in which he had previously served.

In 1927, Wingate moved to the same position in Baluchistan. Soon thereafter, in 1928, he was appointed the Deputy Commissioner and Political Agent in Quetta and Pishin. Wingate would later call his years in Quetta, "the happiest time that [he] spent in India," and greatly enjoyed the autonomy and respect he was granted there. While serving in Quetta, Wingate established a new water supply to the city, and frequently became involved in matters relating to security and criminal justice.

While in Quetta, Wingate ordered the arrest of several leaders of the Achakzai tribe. In retaliation, members of the tribe kidnapped two British military officers near the town of Chaman and held them for ransom, leading to "considerable criticism" of Wingate by the Army. In the end, Wingate paid a small portion of the ransom demanded, and threatened to send troops after the kidnappers, leading to the release of both the hostages. During his time in Quetta, Wingate also briefly hosted King Amānullāh who was en route to Europe. In 1930, Wingate received a year's leave from India, during which he traveled around Europe. Upon his return to Baluchistan, in 1931, he became the Political Agent in Sibi, but after only a few months he received a new assignment with the Indian government in Delhi.

== Indian government ==
In 1932, Wingate was appointed the Deputy Secretary of the Foreign and Political Department of the Indian government. As India was in the middle of reforms aimed at eventual independence, the result of the report of the Simon Commission, Wingate found the period a very interesting time to be in the high levels of the government. His first job was to help integrate the princely states into federation with the rest of India in preparation for independence. A particular challenge in the process involved determining how many representatives each of the states would have in the Constituent Assembly of India. Wingate proposed "a scheme based upon permutations and combinations of the number of guns which were fired to salute the categories of Indian princes". The idea was acclaimed "as a stroke of genius" and adopted by the government.

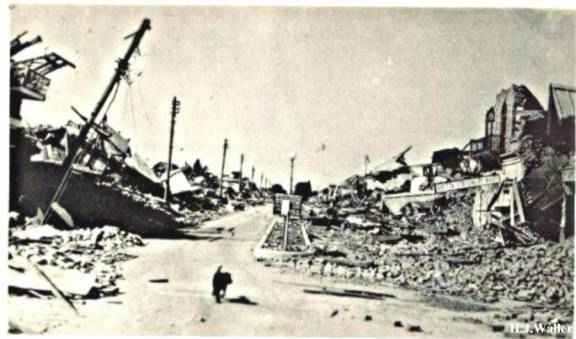
Quetta after the earthquake

In May 1935, Wingate was granted a year's leave and went to Vichy for a much needed vacation with his wife. While in Vichy, Wingate heard of the terrible 1935 Quetta earthquake and returned immediately to England to see if his services were required by the government. Because of his loyalty to Quetta, Wingate volunteered to return there immediately. He was not asked to return immediately, but in October (after less than half of his promised leave), Wingate was ordered to return to India and become the Revenue Commissioner of Baluchistan.

Upon returning to Quetta, Wingate was saddened to find that most of his friends and acquaintances in the city had been killed by earthquake, and he spent the first six weeks of his time in the city helping to remove "four hundred smashed and disintegrating corpses a day" from the ruins of the city. Shortly thereafter, the Chief Commissioner of Baluchistan, Norman Cater, left his position and Wingate became the Acting Chief Commissioner of Baluchistan. During this period, Wingate, like most officers of the Indian Civil Service, supported Indian self-rule, and began to see the end of British India as inevitable. As such, Wingate decided in 1936 that he would leave India once his term as revenue commissioner ended. In November 1937, he was offered the position of Minister to Nepal but declined. Instead, he took two years of leave that he had saved, planning to retire at its conclusion.

Wingate spent the next year traveling throughout Europe, and in early 1939, he rented a flat on the Chelsea Embankment, where he planned to live with his wife. He spent his time exploring London and soon began planning to run for a seat in House of Commons as the member from his constituency was planning to retire. After the outbreak of the Second World War, however, the member of parliament decided not to retire, and Wingate abandoned his hopes at politics, deciding that he would "have been quite useless as a Member of Parliament."

== Second World War ==
Photograph of the London Controlling Section. Wingate is third from the right.

With the outbreak of the Second World War, Wingate was assigned to the Ministry of Economic Warfare, working in Southeast Asia and Africa and granted the rank of second lieutenant in the Army. Early on in the war Sir Ronald's had preceded him. he was called to No.10 with Cawthorne and Peter Fleming to escort the Prime Minister to Washington DC. In March 1942 he boarded the RMS Queen Mary for the Trident Conference, the outcome of which was disappointing for the British, losing the arguments to the Americans. Wingate pressed for a combined strategy for the China-Burma theatre of deception; but the British did not give up throughout the war to resume parity with the United States Joint Staff Planners. In September 1942, he was assigned to the London Controlling Section (LCS), an organization devoted to military deception, and part of the joint planning staff of the War Cabinet. Wingate initially served as the Army representative of the operations subsection, and from March 1943 onward he served as Deputy Controller of the LCS under Colonel John Bevan, Wingate was well-qualified for the position due to his extensive social connections, including friendships with several European monarchs, as well as a reputation for cunning. While at LCS, Wingate was cleared for Ultra access to the highest levels of secrecy; he worked closely with Hastings Ismay about whom he later wrote a biography. The two were already friendly with each other, having spent time together in India. While serving with the LCS, Wingate held the rank of lieutenant colonel.

Early in 1943, Wingate and Bevan devised Plan Jael, an effort to disguise the true nature and location of the D-Day landings. Wingate first presented Plan Jael to a meeting of American and British officers in the summer of 1943, who found the plan "so ambitious as to be the subject of some question as to its general plausibility." In the end, the plan evolved into Operation Bodyguard, which Wingate helped to co-ordinate.

Wingate participated in the planning for many deceptions, including Operation Mincemeat's sister, codenamed Brass for which he approved the letters planted on a fake corpse. Three karens agents were dropped and turned by the Japanese, who thought they had new transmitters, but in fact were doubled by the Allied controller. Wingate was also involved in the cover plans for Operation Neptune, the cross channel phase of Operation Overlord. Sir Frederick Morgan, the original planner of Operation Overlord, initially believed that no deception plan could successfully disguise Neptune, but Wingate convinced him to at least allow LCS to make an effort. After second thoughts the proposals were encapsulated in Operation Neptune.

The Germans couldn't fail to notice Allied plans for an invasion of France. So Wingate devised a deception to mirror Overlord codenamed Royal Flush, which recommended that they approach three neutral countries: Spain, Sweden and Turkey to ask for their assistance with landings in Southern France. The Allies hoped that the Spanish in particular would pass this information along to the Germans, who would then expect landings in southern France, rather than in Normandy. The plan proved greatly successful; the Spanish passed the information to the Germans and even agreed to provide humanitarian aid for soldiers wounded in the landings. After the Normandy landings, the British used the Spanish for further deception by replying that they no longer needed Spanish assistance as the Normandy landings had been so successful that the plans for the south of France had been canceled. The Spanish reported this information to the Germans, helping to deceive them about the actual landings in the South of France in August 1944. On his at back from D Division (Note: info on this Fictitious unit cane be found in D Division Weekly Paper, Nos 8 & 9 JSC folder Deception, SE Asia, WW II Historical D Div Supreme Allied Commander, SACSEA – 14 Mar 1945 to 4 Jun 1945.)

From India he flew into Cairo Rear HQ with Peter Thorne to arrange the last operation of the Middle eastern campaign. He had arrived on 24 October with orders from Mountbatten (SACSEA) and Fleming. As if to continue a deception, he had visited the theatre in New Delhi on 20 December, and JSC on 29th. Wingate radically reformed the 'mutual admiration society' in a restructuring of D Division. To find out what notional information could be passed onto the Japanese by Peter Fleming in India about German intelligence to assist A Force and SEAC operations. Wingate departed Cairo for the last time on 23 April 1945. At the end of the war he teamed up with Jonny Bevan in the Far East, where he was warmly welcomed when he arrived at Manila to work with Goldbranson, the American agent. The Americans were eager to hasten the end of the war, but Wingate steadied the ship, when the extent of US spycraft was an appearance by Douglas Fairbanks jr.

At the end of the war, Wingate was chosen by the Combined Chiefs of Staff to write an official history of Allied deception during the war. The report, which has been described as "urbane, literate and readable" dealt more with the British than the Americans, but provided an excellent reference and was approved by a conference in London in June 1947. Like other reports of the Allied deception strategies, the report was kept secret for many years as Wingate explained: "We wanted no articles in the Reader's Digest about how the Allies had outwitted the German General Staff. It was felt we might have to take on the Russian General Staff."

== Later life and publications ==
After the war, Wingate served on the British delegation to the Tripartite Commission for the Restitution of Monetary Gold and in 1947, he became the British delegate on the commission. Wingate retired from the Commission in 1958, after it had completed most of its work. Shortly after leaving the Tripartite Commission, Wingate was named a Companion in The Most Honourable Order of the Bath in the New Year's list of 1959. Wingate also entered the world of business, serving on the board of the Imperial Continental Gas Association from 1953 until 1966.

In his later life, Wingate also wrote several books, beginning with Wingate of the Sudan, a biography of his father published in 1955. Next, Wingate wrote his own memoirs, Not in the Limelight, published in 1959. Finally, in 1970, he wrote Lord Ismay, a biography of Hastings Ismay.

Wingate of the Sudan was a fairly short biography, primarily based on private correspondence and diaries, to which Wingate naturally had access. Writing in the Middle East Journal, Muhammad Sabry called the book "a real contribution to African history," applauding Wingate's style and accuracy.

Wingate named his memoirs, Not in the Limelight, as a reference to his own career, perpetually around significant events but rarely playing a central role in them. Olaf Caroe wrote that the book was "engaging" with "flashes of shrewdness" and "a sense of wit". Caroe and others also praised the various intriguing details which Wingate revealed about both colonial India and the Second World War, for example Wingate's revelations about the Treaty of Seeb.

Wingate's final book, Lord Ismay: A Biography was released in 1970. The book was "an adulatory biography" which made Wingate's personal respect for Ismay quite clear. As such, the book stood in contrast to Ismay's own memoirs which were "modest and discreet." The book was well received, and Brian Porter wrote in International Affairs that it was a "welcome contribution to recent history."

Wingate died on August 31, 1978, at the age of 88.

== Notes ==
Political offices
Preceded by Lionel Berkeley Holt Haworth	Consul to Oman; 17 October 1919 – 3 March 1920	Succeeded by M.J. Gazdar
Preceded by M.J. Gazdar	Consul to Oman; 11 April 1920 – October 1921	Succeeded by Maitland Easten Rae
Preceded by Maitland Easten Rae	Consul to Oman; February – September 1923	Succeeded by Reginald Graham Hinde
Preceded by Alexander Norman Ley Cater	Chief Commissioner of Balochistan; 1936–1937	Succeeded by Arthur Edward Broadbent Parsons
Preceded by Arthur Edward Broadbent Parsons	Chief Commissioner of Balochistan; 1937	Succeeded by Olaf Kirkpatrick Caroe
Baronetage of the United Kingdom
Preceded by Reginald Wingate	Baronet (of Dunbar and Port Sudan); 1953–1978	Extinct
