= Reginald Wingate =

British general, administrator and diplomat (1861–1953)

General Sir Reginald Wingate Bt GCB GCVO GBE KCMG DSO KStJ TD DL
- Wingate in 1903

Governor-General of Sudan
- In office 22 December 1899 – 31 December 1916
- Monarchs: Queen Victoria; Edward VII; George V
- Preceded by: The Lord Kitchener
- Succeeded by: Sir Lee Stack

High Commissioner in Egypt
- In office January 1917 – October 1919
- Monarch: George V
- Preceded by: Sir Henry McMahon
- Succeeded by: The Viscount Allenby

Personal details
- Born: Francis Reginald Wingate; 25 June 1861 Port Glasgow, Scotland
- Died: 29 January 1953 (aged 91) Dunbar, Scotland
- Spouse: Catherine Rundle (m. 1888)
- Relations: Ronald Wingate (son), Orde Wingate (cousin)
- Awards: Knight Grand Cross of the Order of the Bath; Knight Grand Cross of the Royal Victorian Order; Knight Grand Cross of the Order of the British Empire; Knight Commander of the Order of St Michael and St George; Distinguished Service Order; Knight of the Order of St John; Territorial Decoration
- Nickname: Wingate of the Sudan

Military service
- Allegiance: United Kingdom
- Branch/service: British Army; Egyptian Army
- Years of service: 1880–1922
- Rank: General, Sirdar
- Commands: Egypt; Hejaz
- Battles/wars: Mahdist War; First World War; Invasion of Darfur

General Sir Francis Reginald Wingate, 1st Baronet (25 June 1861 – 29 January 1953) was a British Army officer and imperial administrator, principal founder and Governor-General of the Anglo-Egyptian Sudan. His central role in the administration of the Sudan earned him the nickname "Wingate of the Sudan".

== Early life ==
Wingate was born at Port Glasgow, Renfrewshire (now Inverclyde), the seventh son of Andrew Wingate, a textile merchant of Glasgow, and Elizabeth, daughter of Richard Turner who was a wealthy Irish iron founder and manufacturer of glasshouses. Wingate's father died when he was a year old, and the family, in straitened circumstances, moved to Jersey, where he was educated at St James's Collegiate School.

== Military career ==
He entered the Royal Military Academy, Woolwich, and was commissioned a lieutenant in the Royal Artillery on 27 July 1880. He served in India and Aden from March 1881 to 1883, when he joined the 4th Battalion of the Egyptian Army on its reorganisation by Sir Evelyn Wood with the brevet rank of major. In the Gordon Relief Expedition of 1884–1885, he was ADC and military secretary to Wood.

After holding an appointment in England for a brief period as ADC to Wood, who was now General Officer Commanding Eastern District, he rejoined the Egyptian Army in 1886 as assistant military secretary to Sir Francis Grenfell.

He took part in the operations on the Sudan frontier in 1889, including the engagement at Toski and in the further operations in 1891, being present at the capture of Tokar. His principal work was in the intelligence branch, of which he became assistant adjutant-general in 1888 and director in 1892. A master of Arabic, his knowledge of the country, the examination of prisoners, refugees and others from the Sudan, and the study of documents captured from the Dervishes enabled him to publish in 1891 Mahdiism and the Egyptian Sudan, an authoritative account of the rise of Muhammad Ahmad and of subsequent events in the Sudan up to that date. In 1894 he was governor of Suakin. He was promoted to brevet lieutenant-colonel on 18 November 1896.

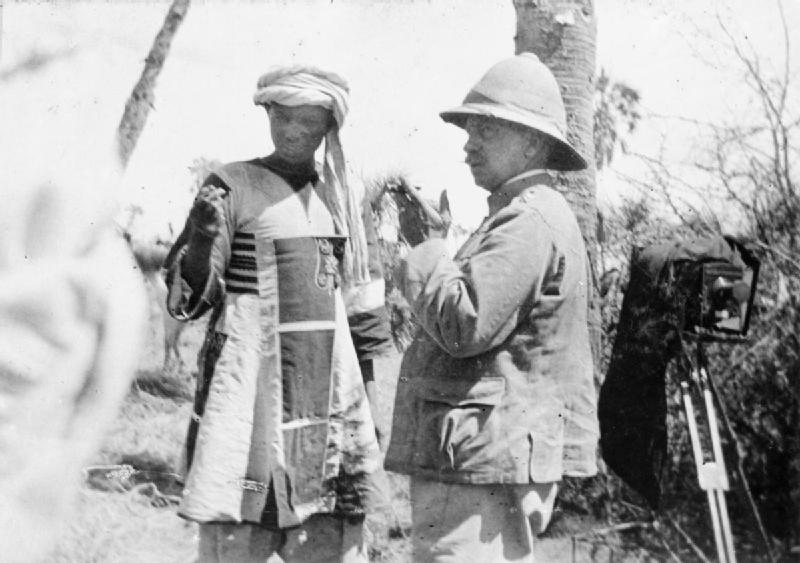
Wingate interrogating the defeated dervish commander Emir Mahmoud after the 1898 Battle of Atbara.

Largely through his assistance, Fathers Ohrwalder and Rossignoli, and two nuns escaped from Omdurman in 1891. Wingate also made the arrangements which led to the escape of Slatin Pasha in 1895. He translated into English Father Ohrwalder's narrative (Ten Years in the Mahdi's Camp, 1892) and Slatin's book (Fire and Sword in the Sudan; 1896).

As director of military intelligence he served in the campaigns of 1896–1898 which resulted in the reconquest of the Sudan, including the engagement at Firket, the battles of the Atbara and Omdurman and the expedition to Fashoda. He was again Mentioned in despatches for this work. He briefly (March–June 1897) went to Abyssinia as second in command of the Rennell Rodd mission. For his services he was promoted brevet colonel and made an extra ADC to Queen Victoria on 17 December 1897. On 8 September 1898, he was promoted to the regimental rank of major.

Wingate was in command of an expeditionary force which in November 1899 defeated the remnant of the Dervish host at the Umm Diwaykarat, Kordofan, the khalifa being among the slain. His daughter who was named Victoria Alexandrina Catherine Wingate was born the day after the victory against the Khalifa. Her baptism took place in January 1900 at All Saints' Church, Cairo. As a measure of the esteem in which Wingate was held, Queen Victoria was the child's principal Godmother.

== Administrative career ==
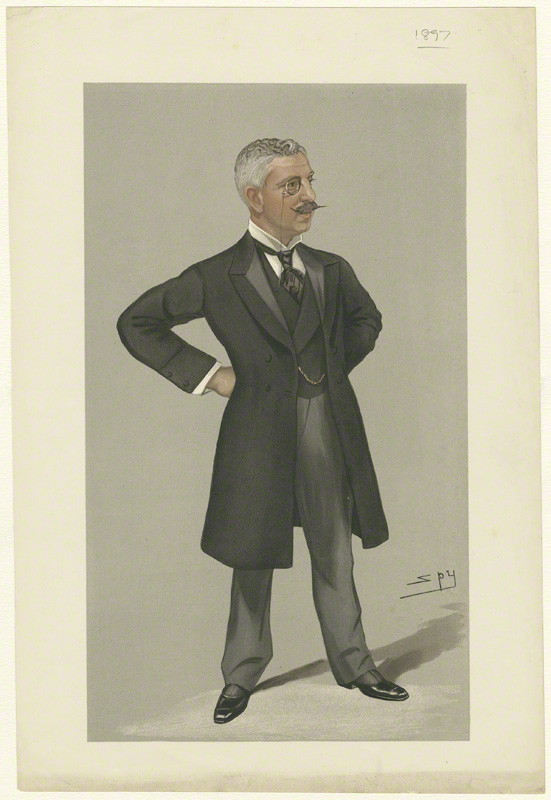
Wingate caracitured by Spy for Vanity Fair, 1897

In December 1899, following Lord Kitchener being summoned to South Africa, Sir Reginald Wingate succeeded him as Governor-General of the Sudan and Sirdar of the Egyptian Army, being promoted to local major general on 22 December 1899. His administration of Anglo-Egyptian Sudan between 1899 and 1916, achieved the colonial goals of the British Empire, with the colony regaining a degree of prosperity and its infrastructure being rebuilt and expanded. In 1909, at the request of the British government, Wingate undertook a special mission to Somaliland to report on the military situation in connection with the proposed evacuation of the interior of the protectorate. He was promoted to the rank of general in November 1913.

From 1916 to 1919 he was also commander of military operations in the Hejaz.

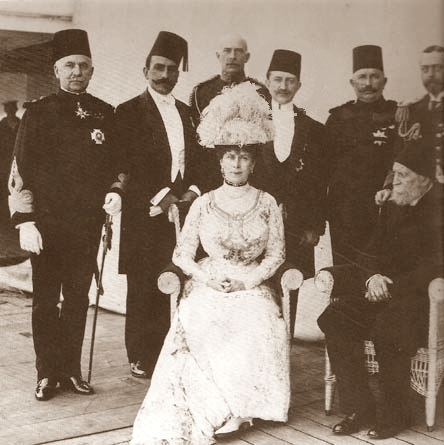
Wingate (far left) with British, Egyptian and Turkish royalty in 1911

In 1917, Wingate succeeded Sir Henry McMahon as High Commissioner in Egypt, a post he held until 1919. He was not a successful administrator in the very different political climate in that country, and was made a scapegoat for the riots incited by Saad Zaghlul and his party that spread across Egypt. Angry at his treatment, Wingate refused to actually resign, even after he was officially replaced by Lord Allenby, and threatened to embarrass the British Government. He was refused a peerage or another appointment, although he was created a baronet in the 1920 Birthday Honours, gazetted as a Baronet, of Dunbar, in the County of Haddington, and of Port Sudan. He never held another public or military office, retiring from the Army on 1 February 1922, but became a director of a number of companies. He continued to hold honorary positions in the army: as Colonel Commandant, Royal Artillery and Honorary Colonel of the 7th Battalion Manchester Regiment (appointed 1914), of the 57th (Lowland) Medium Brigade, Royal Artillery (appointed in 1922), and of the 65th Anti-Aircraft Regiment Royal Artillery (6th/7th Battalion Manchester Regiment) (appointed in 1941, which he retained until 27 September 1949.)

== Family ==
Wingate married Catherine Rundle (later Dame Catherine Wingate) on 18 June 1888. Wingate was the first cousin once removed to Orde Wingate, who led British commando units in Palestine, Sudan and Burma before and during the Second World War.

The couple had five children:

- Sir Ronald Evelyn Leslie Wingate, 2nd Baronet (30 September 1889 – 31 August 1978)
- Graham Andrew Leslie Wingate (27 August 1892 – 11 September 1892)
- Malcolm Roy Wingate (28 August 1893 – 21 March 1918)
- Lucy Elizabeth Leslie Wingate (1896-1978)
- Victoria Alexandrina Catherine Wingate (1899 – 1989)

Wingate was succeeded in his baronetcy by his son Ronald Wingate.

== Legacy ==
Wingate is commemorated in the scientific name of a species of lizard, Trachylepis wingati, which is endemic to Ethiopia and Sudan.

== Works ==
- Mahdiism and the Egyptian Sudan: Being an Account of the Rise and Progress of Mahdiism and of Subsequent events in the Sudan Up to the Present Time by Francis Reginald Wingate
- Ten Years' Captivity in the Mahdi's Camp, 1882–1892 by Fr. Ohrwalder, translated by Wingate
- Ten Years' Captivity in the Mahdi's Camp, 1882–1892 by Fr. Ohrwalder, translated by Wingate (1892) (Project Gutenberg HTML and other full-text versions)
- Fire and Sword in the Sudan by Slatin, translated by Wingate

== Honours and decorations ==
In 1887 he received the Order of the Medjidieh 4th Class. In 1883 he received the Order of Osmanieh 4th Class from the Khedive. In June 1885, he was Mentioned in Despatches for service in operations in the Suakin and Upper Nile regions. In 1891 he was promoted to the 3rd Class of the Order of the Medjidieh. He was appointed Companion of the Order of the Bath (CB) in the 1895 Birthday Honours. He was awarded the Distinguished Service Order (DSO) He was awarded the Star of Ethiopia 2nd Class. He was promoted to Knight Commander of the Order of the Bath (KCB) on 13 March 1900, He was awarded the Order of Osmanieh 2nd Class. He was appointed a Knight Commander of the Order of St Michael and St George (KCMG) on 11 November 1898. In 1901 he was promoted to the Order of the Medjidie 1st Class, and in 1905 to the Order of the Osmanieh 1st Class. In 1905 received the honorary degree of Doctor of Civil Law from the University of Oxford. He was appointed Knight Grand Cross of the Royal Victorian Order (GCVO) on 17 January 1912, Knight Grand Cross of the Order of the Bath (GCB) in the 1914 Birthday Honours, and Knight Grand Cross of the Order of the British Empire (GBE) in the 1918 New Year Honours. He was made Honorary Colonel of the 7th Battalion, Manchester Regiment on 16 December 1914, and a Colonel Commandant of the Royal Artillery on 17 May 1917. In 1915 he was awarded the Grand Cordon of the Order of the Nile, and in 1917 the Grand Cordon of the Order of Mohammad Ali. He was made a Knight of the Venerable Order of St John (KStJ) in 1919. He was awarded the Efficiency Decoration (TD) in 1935. He was also appointed a Deputy Lieutenant for the County of East Lothian.

== Bibliography ==
- Bierman, J; Smith, C (1999). Fire in the Night: Wingate of Burma, Ethiopia, and Zion. London.
- Daly, Martin W. (1997). The Sirdar: Sir Reginald Wingate and the British Empire in the Middle East (Biography, online in full). Philadelphia: American Philosophical Society. ISBN 0-87169-222-8.
- Dorril, Stephen (2000). MI6: Fifty Years of Special Operations. London.
- Fieldhouse, D.K. (2006). Western Imperialism in the Middle East, 1914–1958. Oxford.
- Long, C.W.R (2005). British Pro-Consuls in Egypt, 1914–1929: The challenge of nationalism. London: Routledge. ISBN 0415595010.
- Pugh, Roy J.M (2011). Wingate Pasha: The Life of General Sir Francis Reginald Wingate, 1861-1953. Pen and Sword Military. ISBN 978-1848845312.
- Royle, Trevor (1993). Orde Wingate: Irregular Soldier. London.
- Westrate, Bruce (1992). The Arab Bureau: British Policy in the Middle East, 1916–1920. University Park, Penn.
- Wingate, Ronald (1955). Wingate of Sudan: The Life and Times General Sir Reginald Wingate, Maker of Anglo-Egyptian Sudan. London: John Murray.
- Daly, M W. "Wingate, Sir Francis Reginald, first baronet (1861–1953)". Oxford Dictionary of National Biography (online ed.). Oxford University Press. doi:10.1093/ref:odnb/36977. (Subscription, Wikipedia Library access or UK public library membership required.)

Military offices
| Preceded by The Lord Kitchener | Sirdar of the Egyptian Army; 1899–1916 | Succeeded by Sir Lee Stack |
Political offices
| Preceded by The Lord Kitchener | Governor-General of the Sudan; 1899–1916 | Succeeded by Sir Lee Stack |
| Preceded by Sir Henry McMahon | British High Commissioner in Egypt; 1917–1919 | Succeeded by The Viscount Allenby |
Baronetage of the United Kingdom
| New creation | Baronet (of Dunbar and Port Sudan); 1920–1953 | Succeeded by Ronald Wingate |
