= David Wingate (poet) =

- Born: 1828
- Died: 1892 (aged 63–64)
- Occupation: Poet
- Writing career
- Genre: Poetry

David Wingate (1828–1892) was a Scottish poet and miner, sometimes known as 'the collier poet'.

His father died when he was five years old. Wingate started work in the coal-fields near his home in Cowglen, Renfrewshire when he was nine, and at 17 he was the main breadwinner for his mother and family. He married Janet Craig in 1850 and had 11 children, including Walter who became a poet and teacher. In the 1850s he worked in Pollokshaws and later Bellshill. After his first wife died he married his first wife's cousin Margaret Thompson, a granddaughter of Burns.

By 1862 he was living in Motherwell. In this year his Poems and Songs (1862) was published by William Blackwood, favourably reviewed, then followed by Annie Weir (1866). After this he studied at the Glasgow School of Mines, became a colliery manager, and devoted his increased leisure to study and further literary work. Lily Neil appeared in 1879, and was followed by another volume of Poems and Songs (1883). In 1882 he was granted a civil list pension of £50 per year. A collection of his work came out in 1890 as Selected Poems.

He is buried in Motherwell.

== Work online ==
- Poems and Songs (1862)
- Poems including Annie Weir
