= Wingate baronets =

Extinct baronetcy in the Baronetage of the United Kingdom

Sir Reginald Wingate, 1st Baronet

The Wingate Baronetcy, of Dunbar in the County of Haddington and of Port Sudan, was a title in the Baronetage of the United Kingdom, created on 6 July 1920 for General Sir Reginald Wingate in recognition of his long service as a military leader and colonial administrator in Egypt and the Sudan. Sir Reginald was succeeded by his son, Sir Ronald Wingate, 2nd Baronet. The title became extinct upon Sir Ronald's death in 1978.

== Wingate baronets, of Dunbar and Port Sudan (1920) ==
- Sir (Francis) Reginald Wingate, 1st Baronet (1861–1953)
- Sir Ronald Evelyn Leslie Wingate, 2nd Baronet (1889–1978)
