= David Robert Wingate =

- Born: 20 February 1819; Darlington County, South Carolina, U.S.
- Died: 15 February 1899 (aged 79)
- Burial place: Evergreen Cemetery Orange, Texas, U.S.
- Spouse: Caroline Morgan
- Military career
- Allegiance: Confederate States of America
- Branch: Confederate States Army
- Conflicts: American Civil War

David Robert Wingate (February 20, 1819 – 1899) was an American lumber businessman and plantation farmer who served in the Confederate Army as the commissioner of defense for Jefferson County, Texas, during the American Civil War. Overcoming numerous financial setbacks throughout his lifetime, he remained a successful industrialist. He owned hundreds of slaves.

== Biography ==
On February 20, 1819, he was born in Darlington County, South Carolina, to Robert Potter and Pherobee (Kelly) Wingate. At an early age, his family moved to the delta region of the Mississippi River where logging and sawmills were prevalent. His education was unsophisticated, and he began to work in the lumber industry as a basic hand. At the age of 20, he married Caroline Morgan, a native of Mississippi with whom he had seven children. In 1849, at the age of 30, he owned his first sawmill in Mississippi. After three years of business there (including the rebuilding of the mill from a fire), Wingate moved to Newton County, Texas, in 1852, where he established a large cotton plantation. Within seven years, he became the largest antebellum cotton planter in Southeast Texas, with seventy to eighty slaves working the site.

== Venture back into the lumber business ==
Wingate saw the lacking timber market of the area as an opportunity, and this led to his discovery of the abandoned Spartan Mill at Sabine Pass. By 1859, he owned this sawmill, which he improved to be the largest steam sawmill facility in the state. He moved his family and thirteen of his slaves to this coastal town. In addition, he established a small fleet of lumber schooners for trade across the Gulf of Mexico. In summer 1860, the Wingate Mill Industries steam boiler exploded, killing several of his employees and disfiguring others. Wingate quickly rebuilt the equipment to continue to operate his mill and to resume providing employment for his people.

== Participation in the American Civil War ==
In April 1861, Wingate and one of his sons enlisted in the Sabine Pass Guard. David was appointed as chairman of safety for Sabine Pass, as well as Confederate States marshal of the east Texas region. During this time, he began blockade running, but lost a steamer he owned in 1862 when it ran aground. He and his crew torched the craft and the cargo of 500 bales of cotton to avoid capture. At this time, Wingate is credited with supplying the logs needed to build Fort Sabine. In August 1862, the yellow fever epidemic reached Sabine Pass, triggering Wingate to evacuate his family back to Newton County where they remained until the end of the war. Several months later on October 21, a Union Navy patrol invaded Sabine Pass, destroying his sawmill and residence there with fire. In 1864, Wingate was elected chief justice of Newton County, with the provisional civilian governor Andrew J. Hamilton giving him the same appointment the following year.

== Financial losses and Wingate's move to Orange ==
In 1873, Wingate suffered another substantial financial loss. His transporting craft along with the cargo of cotton being shipped to market, worth about $50,000 on that day, sank in the Sabine River. That same year, Wingate and his wife moved to Orange as he was seeking opportunities once again in the lumber trade. In 1878, his new sawmill called the D. R. Wingate and Company began to operate, but just two years later, it was consumed by fire at a cost equal to that of his last loss. The city of Orange benefited from the presence of David R. Wingate, despite his unfortunate luck with fires. During the 1880s, he built larger facilities, with the demand for lumber always strong. Wingate also served as judge of Orange County from 1878 until 1884. After his wife's death in 1890, he ventured into rice farming which succeeded well and added new commerce to the region. On February 15, 1899, Wingate died due to pneumonia and was buried in Evergreen Cemetery in Orange.
