= Blade Running =

Single by Donkeyboy

from the album Caught in a Life
- Released: 2009
- Genre: Alternative rock Indie pop
- Length: 3:35
- Label: Warner Music Norway
- Songwriter(s): Simen Eriksrud, Espen Berg, Cato Sundberg, Kent Sundberg

Donkeyboy singles chronology
| "Awake" (2009) | "Blade Running" (2009) | "Stereolife" (2010) |

Blade Running is an English language hit in Norway for the Norwegian band Donkeyboy, their fifth single taken from their album Caught in a Life after singles "Ambitions" and "Sometimes" (both #1s for 13 and 8 weeks consecutively in the Norwegian Singles Chart), "Broke My Eyes" (that reached #6) and Awake (that reached #8)

"Blade Running" released in 2009 reached #8 in the Norwegian Singles Chart.

== Charts ==
| Chart (2009) | Peak position |
|---|---|
| Norwegian Singles Chart | 8 |
