= Pål Angelskår =

Norwegian musician

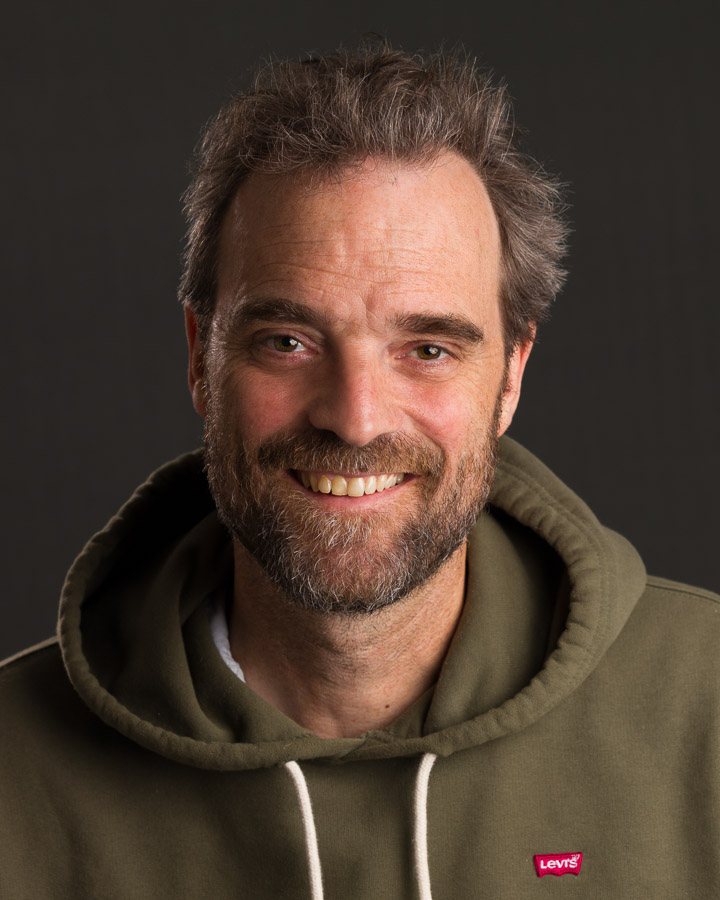
Pål Angelskår

Pål Angelskår (born in Oslo, Norway in 1973) is a Norwegian musician from Oslo.

He started as a member of Reverend Lovejoy starting 1998. He is best known as the singer-songwriter in the Norwegian group Minor Majority starting 2000. Pål Angelskår was lead vocalist for the band and played guitar. He was joined by Jon Arild Stieng (vocals and guitars), Harald Sommerstad (keyboards), Henrik Harr Widerøe (bass, banjo, vocals) and Halvor Høgh Winsnes (drums).

In 2011, he published his poetry book in Norwegian titled "I sommer skal jeg gifte meg med Cecilie". In 2012, he released his first solo album Follow Me and in 2014, he released a collection of short stories titled "Er vi venner igjen?".

== Discography ==
=== Albums ===
Solo

Year	Album	Peak position	Certifications	Notes
Year	Album	NOR	Certifications	Notes
2012	Follow Me	16		

with Reverend Lovejoy

- 1998: Another Time, Another Place
- 2000: Polo is not the issue darling, Champagne is!
- 2003: Way Past Sorry

with Minor Majority

(for chart positions, refer to Minor Majority discography)

- 2001: Walking Home from Nicole's
- 2002: If I Told You, You Were Beautiful
- 2004: Up for You & I
- 2006: Reasons to Hang Around
- 2007: Candy Store
- 2009: Either Way I Think You Know

=== Singles ===
featured in

- 2007: "Living In Between" (MiNa feat. Pål Angelskår)

with Minor Majority

(for chart positions, refer to Minor Majority discography)

- 2006: "Come Back to Me"
- 2006: "Supergirl"

== Bibliography ==
- 2011: "I sommer skal jeg gifte meg med Cecilie" (poems)
- 2014: "Er vi venner igjen?" (short stories)
