= Linnea Dale =

Norwegian singer

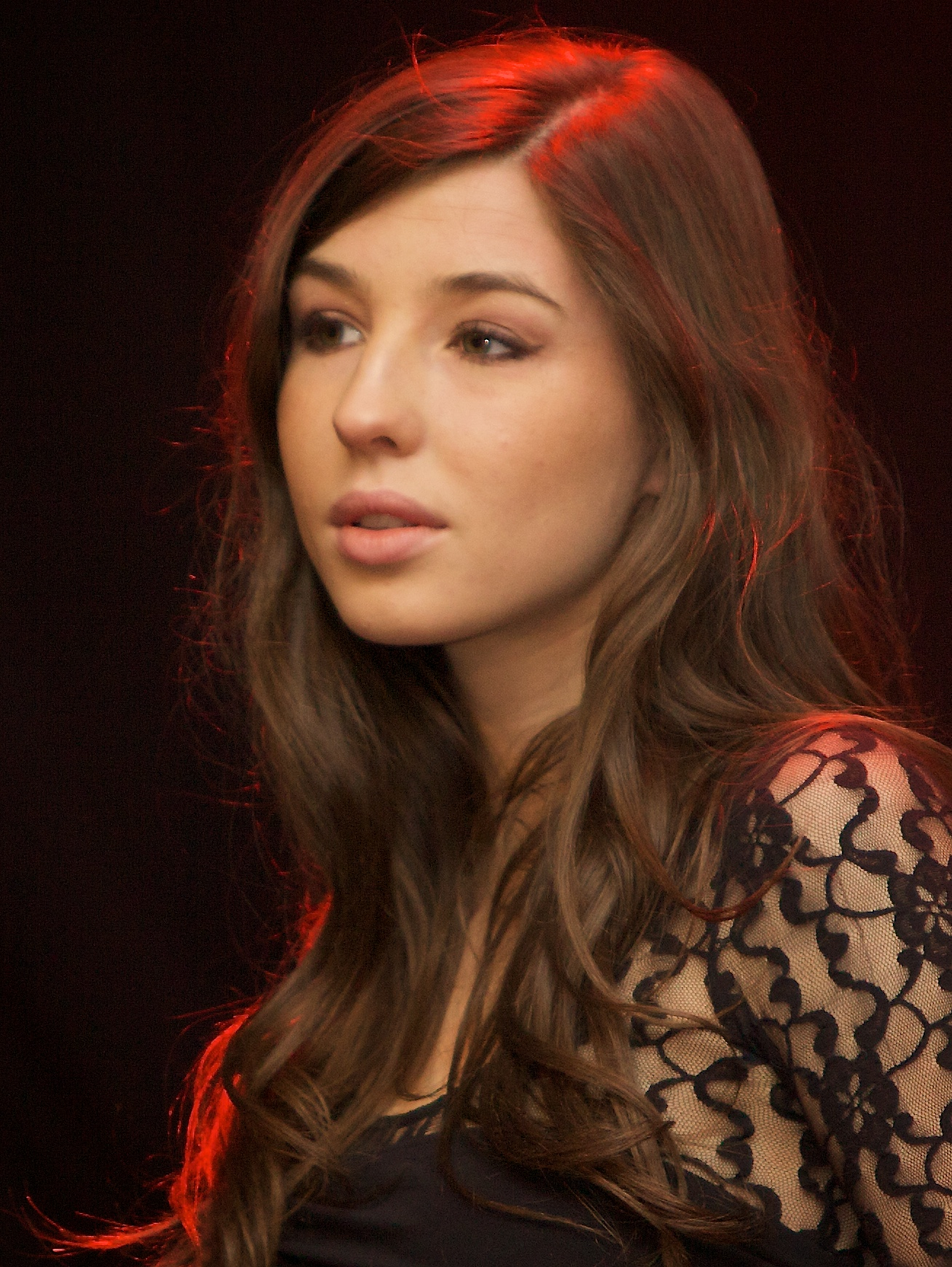

Background information
- Born: 22 April 1991 (age 35); Tinn, Telemark, Norway
- Genres: Pop; electropop; alternative pop
- Occupations: Singer, songwriter
- Instruments: Vocals, piano
- Years active: 2007–present

Linnea Dale (born 22 April 1991) is a Norwegian singer and songwriter.

== Early life ==
Linnea Dale was born in Tinn Municipality in Telemark, Norway. She attended the high school Skien videregående skole.

== Idol ==
She was a contestant on the fifth season of the Norwegian Idol series in 2007, finishing in seventh place. She performed "What Do I Know About Love", a song written by herself, in the semi-finals on 10 October. She has qualified for the Norwegian final.

== Musical career ==
In 2009, Dale collaborated with the Drammen band Donkeyboy on their debut album Caught in a Life, providing guest vocals on the songs "Ambitions", "Sometimes", and "Awake". "Ambitions" debuted on the Norwegian singles chart at number seven on 6 April 2009, and reached the number one spot on 29 June, after 13 weeks on the charts. She also recorded the song "Anything Goes (and Everything's Alright)" with Magnus Sinnes.

Her first EP, Children Of The Sun, was released 27 January 2012 on Warner Music. Her first solo album, Lemoyne Street, was released in April 2012, with help from producer Øystein Greni and Nikolai Eilertsen from Bigbang.

Dale competed in Melodi Grand Prix 2014, the Norwegian competition to find their representative in the Eurovision Song Contest 2014. She competed with her song "High Hopes" and came second in the gold final.

Her album Good Goodbyes was released on 9 May 2014. Paul Waaktaar, from a-ha, co-wrote and produced three songs.

In 2019 she collaborated with the Norwegian pop band Minor Majority on their album Napkin Poetry, providing guest vocals on the song "Another Year".

== Discography ==
=== Studio albums ===
Title	Details	Peak chart positions
Title	Details	NOR
Lemoyne Street	Released: 2 April 2012; Label: Warner Music Norway; Formats: Physical, digital download, streaming	19
Good Goodbyes	Released: 7 April 2014; Label: Warner Music Norway AS; Formats: Physical, digital download, streaming	—
Wait for the Morning	Released: 9 November 2018; Label: Aftertouch; Formats: Physical, digital download, streaming	—
15 Love	Released: 21 October 2022; Label: Aftertouch; Formats: Physical, digital download, streaming	—
"—" denotes an album that did not chart or was not released in that territory.

=== Extended plays ===
Title	Details
Children of the Sun	Released: 20 January 2012; Label: Warner Music Norway; Formats: Physical, digital download, streaming
Pets (with Of Norway)	Released: 24 May 2019; Label: Beatservice; Formats: Physical, digital download, streaming
Petit Pets (with Of Norway)	Released: 8 January 2021; Label: Beatservice; Formats: Physical, digital download, streaming

=== Singles ===
==== As lead artist ====
Title	Year	Album or EP
"And Then the Sun Comes Up"	2012	Lemoyne Street
"High Hopes"	2014	Good Goodbyes
"Out of Heaven"	2020	15 Love
"Deep in a Dream"	2022	15 Love
"Too Close Too Fast"	2022	15 Love

==== As featured artist ====
Title	Year	Album or EP
"Spirit Lights" (Of Norway featuring Linnea Dale)	2014	Accretion
"Favourite Mistake" (Of Norway featuring Linnea Dale)	2017	The Loneliest Man in Space
"Another Year" (Minor Majority featuring Linnea Dale)	2018	Napkin Poetry
"Hole in the Sky" (Shining featuring Linnea Dale)	2018	Animal
"Think You Should" (Donkeyboy featuring Linnea Dale)	2019	Non-album single
"Baby, Let's Break Our Hearts" (Auden Prey featuring Linnea Dale)	2020	The Game
"Bare noen dager til" (Atle Pettersen featuring Linnea Dale)	2020	Tusen julelys

=== Other appearances ===
==== Hver gang vi møtes (Season 9) ====
Title	Year	Album or EP
"Dagane"	2020	Odd Nordstogas dag
"Som ein båt på land"	2020	Aslag Haugens dag
"Time Machine"	2020	Chris Holstens dag
"All for Love"	2020	Morgan Suleles dag
"Flyge fra"	2020	Frida Ånneviks dag
"Det er ingen hverdag mer"	2020	Tuva Syvertsens dag
"Om du reisten din veg" (with Odd Nordstoga)	2020	Siste dagen
"13 humler"	2020	Siste dagen
