= Triggerfinger (song) =

Single by Donkeyboy
- Released: 23 August 2013
- Recorded: 2013
- Genre: Pop
- Length: 3:10
- Label: Warner Music Norway
- Songwriter(s): Kiesa Rae Ellestad; Kent Sundberg; Cato Sundberg; Espen Berg; Simen Eriksrud
- Producer(s): Donkeyboy

Donkeyboy singles chronology
"Pull of the Eye" (2012)	"Triggerfinger" (2013)	"Crazy Something Normal" (2014)

Kiesza singles chronology
"Triggerfinger" (2013)	"Hideaway" (2014)

Triggerfinger is a 2013 song by Norwegian pop band Donkeyboy featuring uncredited vocals from Canadian musician Kiesza. It was released in Norway on 23 August 2013. The song peaked at number 9 on the Finnish Singles Chart.

== Track listing ==
Digital download
No.	Title	Length
1.	"Triggerfinger"	3:10

== Chart performance ==
=== Weekly charts ===
Chart (2014)	Peak position
Finland (Suomen virallinen lista)	9

== Release history ==
Region	Date	Format	Label
Norway	23 August 2013	Digital download	Warner Music Norway
