= Awake (Donkeyboy song) =

Single by Donkeyboy

from the album Caught in a Life
- Released: 2009
- Genre: Alternative rock Indie pop
- Length: 2:58
- Label: Warner Music Norway
- Songwriter(s): Cato Sundberg/Kent Sundberg/Simen M Eriksrud

Donkeyboy singles chronology
"Broke My Eyes" (2009)	"Awake" (2009)	"Blade Running" (2009)

Awake is an English language hit in Norway for the Norwegian band Donkeyboy, their fourth single taken from their album Caught in a Life after singles "Ambitions" and "Sometimes" (both #1s for 13 and 8 weeks consecutively in the Norwegian Singles Chart) and "Broke My Eyes" (that reached #6).

"Awake" released in 2009 reached #8 in the Norwegian Singles Chart.

== Charts ==
Chart (2009)	Peak position
Norwegian Singles Chart	8
