= Crazy Something Normal =

Single by Donkeyboy
- Released: 24 March 2014
- Genre: Synthpop
- Length: 3:40
- Label: Warner Music
- Songwriter(s): Tiago Miguel Amaral Carvalho, Kiesa Ellestad, Lasse Michelsen, Peter Michelsen, Carlos St John Phillips, Cato Sundberg, Kent Sundberg

Donkeyboy singles chronology
"Triggerfinger" (2013)	"Crazy Something Normal" (2014)	"Hero" (2015)

"Crazy Something Normal" is a single by Donkeyboy, a pop band from Drammen, Norway. The single was released on 24 March 2014. The song features a radio speech vocals and choir vocals. The song reached no. 13 on the Norwegian Single Charts.

== Track listings ==
Digital download
No.	Title	Length
1.	"Crazy Something Normal"	3:25

== Chart performance ==
=== Weekly charts ===
Chart (2014)	Peak position
Finland (Suomen virallinen radiolista)	3
Norway (VG-lista)	13

== Release history ==
Country	Date	Format	Label
Norway	24 March 2014	Digital download	Warner Music Norway
