= Broke My Eyes =

Single by Donkeyboy

from the album Caught in a Life
- Released: 2009
- Genre: Alternative rock, indie pop
- Length: 5:03
- Label: Warner Music Norway
- Songwriter(s): Simen Eriksrud, Espen Berg, Cato Sundberg, Kent Sundberg

Donkeyboy singles chronology
"Sometimes" (2009)	"Broke My Eyes" (2009)	"Awake" (2009)

"Broke My Eyes" is an English language hit in Norway for the Norwegian band Donkeyboy, their third most successful single after "Ambitions" (13 weeks at the top of the Norwegian Singles Chart) and "Sometimes", their second single (8 weeks on top of the charts). All three singles are taken from Donkeyboys' debut album Caught in a Life.

"Broke My Eyes" reached #6 in the Norwegian Singles Chart. The video representing ordinary Norwegians humming and dancing to the tune was directed by Egil Pedersen and Geir Jardar Olsen.

== Nominations ==
- "Broke My Eyes" was nominated for the Best Song and later Best Video by the show Urørt on Norwegian Broadcasting Corporation's NRK P3.

== Charts ==
Chart (2009)	Peak position
Norwegian Singles Chart	6
