= There's a Place for Us (disambiguation) =

There's a Place for Us is a 1965 album by The Supremes.

There's a Place for Us may also refer to:

- "Somewhere" (song), a song from West Side Story with the opening refrain "There's a Place for Us"
- "There's a Place for Us" (song), 2010 song by Carrie Underwood
- "There's a Place for Us", 1993 song by Phil Collins from Both Sides (not to be confused with his 1996 cover of "Somewhere")
