= Minor Majority =

Norwegian pop band

- Origin: Norway
- Genres: Rock; alternative pop; country
- Years active: 2001–2011, 2017–present
- Labels: Big Dipper
- Members: Pål Angelskår; Jon Arild Stieng; Harald Sommerstad; Henrik Harr Widerøe; Halvor Høgh Winsnes
- Past members: Andreas Berczelly
- Website: minormajority.no

The Norwegian pop group Minor Majority was formed by Pål Angelskår and Andreas Berczelly as a studio project in 2000. Their first record, Walking Home from Nicole's, was released one year later with significant help from singer/songwriter Karen Jo Fields.

== History ==
In November 2001, the band saw the addition of guitarist Jon Arild Stieng and the trio went on tour for the first time in the spring of 2002. Berczelly left the band and concentrated full-time on producing, which he has done for the band ever since.

The band's next album, If I Told You, You Were Beautiful, was recorded in Stieng's house in Oslo that same summer, and was released in October. Keyboardist Harald Sommerstad joined Minor Majority for their subsequent tour of spring 2003.

Prior to the Norwegian Quart-festivalen the same year, the band was extended further by drummer Halvor Høgh Winsnes (Fast Winston Doom of Thulsa Doom) and bassist Henrik Widerøe. The group was complete, and in the late summer, Up for You & I was recorded at Sommerstad's cabin near Halden in the south of Norway. The album was released in January 2004, and was an immediate success, boasting 24 weeks on the official Norwegian albums chart, a gold record, and numerous award nominations for best Norwegian pop album of the year.

After the following tour of more than 100 gigs both nationally and abroad (France, Switzerland, and Germany), the band spent the greater part of 2005 in Berczelly's studio, and released their fourth album, Reasons to Hang Around, in January 2006. For it, they were awarded the Norwegian Grammy equivalent, Spellemannsprisen.

2007 saw the release of the compilation album Candy Store. After this release, Minor Majority embarked on a Norwegian tour in September, followed by tours of Germany, France, and Switzerland during the first four months of 2008. The band stated in 2007 that they intended to have a pause from making music, but that they eventually would make at least one more album.

In 2009 they released their next record, Either Way I Think You Know, which reached number eleven on the Norwegian charts.

In September 2018, Minor Majority announced that they would release their sixth studio album in January 2019. The album was titled Napkin Poetry. The first single, "Another Year", was a duet with Linnea Dale.

== Solo work ==
In September 2012, frontman Pål Angelskår released his first solo album, Follow Me.

== Band members ==
Current

- Pål Angelskår – vocals, guitar
- Jon Arild Stieng – guitars, vocals
- Harald Sommerstad – keyboards
- Henrik Harr Widerøe – bass, banjo, vocals
- Halvor Høgh Winsnes – drums

Past

- Andreas Berczelly

== Discography ==
Studio albums

Year	Album	Peak position	Certifications	Notes
Year	Album	NOR	Certifications	Notes
2001	Walking Home from Nicole's	–		
2003	If I Told You, You Were Beautiful	28		
2004	Up for You & I	4		
2006	Reasons to Hang Around	2		
2009	Either Way I Think You Know	12		
2019	Napkin Poetry	–		
2021	The Universe Would Have to Adjust	–		
2022	Kiss Off	–		

Compilations

Year	Album	Peak position	Certifications	Notes
Year	Album	NOR	Certifications	Notes
2007	Candy Store	3		

Live albums

Year	Album	Peak position	Certifications	Notes
Year	Album	NOR	Certifications	Notes
2020	The Other Foot – Live at Sentralen	–		

Singles

Year	Single	Peak position	Certifications	Album
Year	Single	NOR	Certifications	Album
2006	"Come Back to Me"	19		Reasons to Hang Around
2006	"Supergirl"	20		Reasons to Hang Around
2010	"I Drink Alone/Electrolove"	–		non-album single
2016	"I've Been Here Before You"	–		Napkin Poetry
2017	"It's Easier to Sing"	–		non-album single
2017	"Napkin Poetry"	–		Napkin Poetry
2018	"Another Year" feat. Linnea Dale	–		Napkin Poetry
2018	"Patricia"	–		Napkin Poetry
2018	"Lucy"	–		Napkin Poetry

Awards
Preceded by Röyksopp	Recipient of the best Pop band Spellemannprisen; 2006	Succeeded by Superfamily
