= Endling (album) =

Studio album by Kvelertak
- Released: 8 September 2023
- Studio: Duper, Bergen, Norway
- Length: 51:04
- Language: Norwegian
- Label: Rise
- Producer: Jørgen Træen; Yngve Sætre; Iver Sandøy

Kvelertak chronology
Splid (2020)	Endling (2023)

Endling (Norwegian for "ending") is the fifth studio album by Norwegian heavy metal band Kvelertak, released on 8 September 2023 through Rise Records. It was announced alongside the release of the lead single "Krøterveg Te Helvete", and additionally supported by the single "Skonggangr".

== Background and recording ==
Writing for the album began in mid-2020 following the abrupt end to the band's tour supporting Splid due to COVID-19 lockdowns. It was recorded in Bergen with three producers who share the same building, Jørgen Træen, Yngve Sætre, and Iver Sandøy, which guitarist Vidar Landa says "was great, because it made us able to work 24 hours a day". Instead of parts being done separately, the songs were put together "from the beginning" and recorded live.

Landa stated that the album follows "the stories of the extinct and dying men and women of Norway. Old and new myths, culture, and rituals come to life—the folklore that doesn't fit a TV series concept. Vikings and trolls are for television. This is the real deal." The song "Skonggangr" was written about the recluse Helmut Von Botnlaus, whose life also inspired "many of the lyrics".

== Critical reception ==
Professional ratings
Review scores
Source	Rating
AllMusic	4/5 stars
Blabbermouth.net	8/10
Kerrang!	4/5
Metal Hammer	4/5 stars
Metal Injection	9/10
MusicOMH	4.5/5 stars

Jeff Podoshen of Metal Injection wrote that Endling "fits snugly in with their existing catalog", calling it "heavy, groovy and just downright fun" and an album that "will get your attention from the opening note and hold it all the way through". Timothy Monger of AllMusic found that the album "has less to prove yet feels more confident for it" and "touch[es] on a variety of sonic hallmarks from cocky thrash punk ('Motsols') and chunky NWOBHM ('Likvoke') to abrasive folk metal ("Døgeniktens Kvad"), all played with crackling anxious abandon". Dom Lawson of Blabbermouth.net felt that the "second half of Endling has more surprises per square inch than the first" but overall "the results rock stupidly hard, as we should have expected".

Kerrang!'s Nick Ruskell described it as "an album that grabs you and takes you through a land entirely of [Kvelertak's] own" and "not a jigsaw of sounds, it's one complete thing". Reviewing the album for MusicOMH, Ross Horton stated Endling "feels like a fresh start" and remarked that "Kvelertak must be the best entry-level metal band on the planet (save for Ghost)" if "casual newcomers" can "get over [...] Nikolaisen's vocal delivery", as they are able to "unite seemingly opposite ends of the metal spectrum into one cohesive whole". Alex Deller of Metal Hammer opined that Endling "delights in taking one wild swing after another" and observed that this "doesn't descend into chaos or parody is mystifying, but also part of Kvelertak's thrilling appeal", concluding that it is "a wild, bulge-eyed ride into the maelstrom".

== Track listing ==
Endling track listing
No.	Title	Length
1.	"Krøterveg Te Helvete"	7:54
2.	"Fedrekult"	3:51
3.	"Likvoke"	5:19
4.	"Motsols"	3:05
5.	"Døgeniktens Kvad"	6:03
6.	"Endling"	4:11
7.	"Skoggangr"	6:03
8.	"Paranoia 297"	3:17
9.	"Svart September"	3:39
10.	"Morild"	7:42
Total length:		51:04

== Personnel ==
Kvelertak

- Vidar Landa – guitar, percussion
- Ivar Nikolaisen – vocals, percussion
- Marvin Nygaard – bass guitar, percussion
- Maciek Ofstad – guitar, percussion
- Håvard Takle Ohr – drums, percussion
- Bjarte Lund Rolland – guitar, percussion

Additional contributors

- Jørgen Træen – production, mastering, mixing, engineering
- Iver Sandøy – production, engineering, percussion
- Yngve Leidulv Sætre – production
- Remi Juliebø – layout
- Isak Wingsternes – studio assistance

== Charts ==
Chart performance for Endling
Chart (2023)	Peak position
Austrian Albums (Ö3 Austria)	48
Finnish Albums (Suomen virallinen lista)	24
German Albums (Offizielle Top 100)	12
Norwegian Albums (VG-lista)	2
Scottish Albums (OCC)	40
Swedish Albums (Sverigetopplistan)	29
Swiss Albums (Schweizer Hitparade)	25
UK Album Downloads (OCC)	71
UK Independent Albums (OCC)	21
UK Rock & Metal Albums (OCC)	6
US Top Current Album Sales (Billboard)	65
