= Reasons to Hang Around =

Studio album by Minor Majority
- Released: 2006
- Genre: Rock
- Length: 48:24
- Label: Big Dipper

Minor Majority chronology
Up for You & I (2004)	Reasons to Hang Around (2006)	Candy Store (2007)

Professional ratings
Review scores
Source	Rating
Panorama.no	5/6
Verdens Gang	(positive)

Reasons to Hang Around is the fourth album by Norwegian band Minor Majority, released in 2006. All of the songs on the album were written by Pål Angelskår, except "Don't Say You Love Me" and "Keep Coming Around", which were written by Pål Angelskår, Hein Goemans, and Jon Arild Stieng, and "There Will Come Another", written by Kevin Clarke and Gregory Wicky.

Reasons To Hang Around earned Minor Majority a Spellemannsprisen award for best pop group in 2006.

== Track listing ==
1. "Wish You'd Hold That Smile"
2. "Don't Say You Love Me"
3. "Come Back to Me"
4. "As Good as It Gets"
5. "There Will Come Another"
6. "Alison"
7. "You Were Saying"
8. "Let the Night Begin"
9. "Supergirl"
10. "Keep Coming Around"
11. "No Particular Girl"
12. "The Long Way Home"
13. "What You Do to Me"

== Charts ==
Chart performance
Chart (2006)	Peak position
French Albums (SNEP)	175
Norwegian Albums (VG-lista)	2
