= Bruane brenn =

Single by Kvelertak

from the album Meir
- Released: 8 January 2013
- Recorded: 2012
- Genre: Black 'n' roll
- Length: 4:07
- Songwriter(s): Kvelertak
- Producer(s): Kurt Ballou

"Bruane brenn" ("the bridges are burning") is a song by Norwegian heavy metal band Kvelertak. It is a track of the band's second album Meir. The single was premiered on 8 January 2013 on BBC Radio 1's "Rock Show" with Daniel P. Carter and was released on iTunes and Spotify in Scandinavia on 21 January and elsewhere on 28 January. The artwork was created by Seldon Hunt. A music video for the song was released in February 2013.

== Personnel ==
Kvelertak

- Erlend Hjelvik – vocals
- Vidar Landa – guitar
- Bjarte Lund Rolland – guitar, vocals
- Maciek Ofstad – guitar, vocals
- Marvin Nygaard – bass
- Kjetil Gjermundrød – drums

Production

- Kurt Ballou – mixing, production
- Seldon Hunt – artwork
