= Someone Wake Me Up =

Single by Joe McElderry

from the album Wide Awake and The Chronicles of Narnia: The Voyage of the Dawn Treader
- B-side: "There's a Place for Us"
- Released: 5 December 2010
- Recorded: 2009
- Genre: Pop
- Length: 3:26
- Label: Syco Music
- Songwriters: Liam Keenan, Ben Collier, Ray Hedges, Nigel Butler
- Producers: Ray Hedges, Nigel Butler

Joe McElderry singles chronology
"Ambitions" (2010)	"Someone Wake Me Up" (2010)	"There's a Place for Us" (2010)

Music video
- "Someone Wake Me Up" on YouTube

"Someone Wake Me Up" is a 2010 pop song by singer Joe McElderry. The single was released on 5 December 2010 as the third and final single from his debut album, Wide Awake. The single's B-side, "There's a Place for Us", was recorded for the soundtrack of the film The Chronicles of Narnia: The Voyage of the Dawn Treader. The single peaked at No. 68 on the UK Singles Chart.

== Composition and reception ==
Jon O'Brien writing for AllMusic compared "Someone Wake Me Up" to having a combination of the refrain of "Love Story" by Taylor Swift and the backing track of "Teenage Dream" by Katy Perry. Darren Scott of Gay Times described it as a pop ballad unconventional to McElderry's norm, and noted similarities to Wham! Scott appreciated the song's catchy nature, as did David Griffiths of 4Music. OK! also praised the song, calling it "an epic lighters-aloft stunner".

== Live performances ==
McElderry performed "Someone Wake Me Up" for the first time at the annual Christmas Lights turn-on in Sheffield. He appeared on The Late Late Show, This Morning and The Alan Titchmarsh Show and Paul O'Grady Live to promote the single.

== Music video ==
Screenshot from the video

The video for the song intersperses clips from the film The Chronicles of Narnia: The Voyage of the Dawn Treader, with recordings of McElderry performing inside The Dawn Treader, during which the boat is being flooded. The video premiered on McElderry's YouTube channel on 27 November 2010, which was eventually taken down in 2011, along with his previous music videos, to be re-uploaded to Vevo.

== Track listing ==
CD single / digital download

1. "Someone Wake Me Up" – 3:24
2. "There's a Place for Us" – 3:51

== Chart performance ==
The track peaked at No. 68 on the UK Singles Chart, on its entry date of 12 December 2010.

Chart (2010)	Peak position
UK Singles Chart	68
