= Splid =

Studio album by Kvelertak
- Released: 14 February 2020
- Studio: GodCity Studios in Salem, Massachusetts, US
- Genre: Heavy metal, black 'n' roll
- Length: 58:13
- Language: Norwegian; English (tracks 2 and 4)
- Label: Rise
- Producer: Kurt Ballou

Kvelertak chronology
Nattesferd (2016)	Splid (2020)	Endling (2023)

Singles from Splid
- 1. "Bråtebrann" Released: 27 November 2019; 2. "Crack of Doom" Released: 5 January 2020

Splid (Norwegian for "discord") is the fourth studio album by Norwegian heavy metal band Kvelertak, released on 14 February 2020. The album was recorded in GodCity Studios in Salem, Massachusetts, United States. It is the band's first album with vocalist Ivar Nikolaisen and drummer Håvard Takle Ohr.

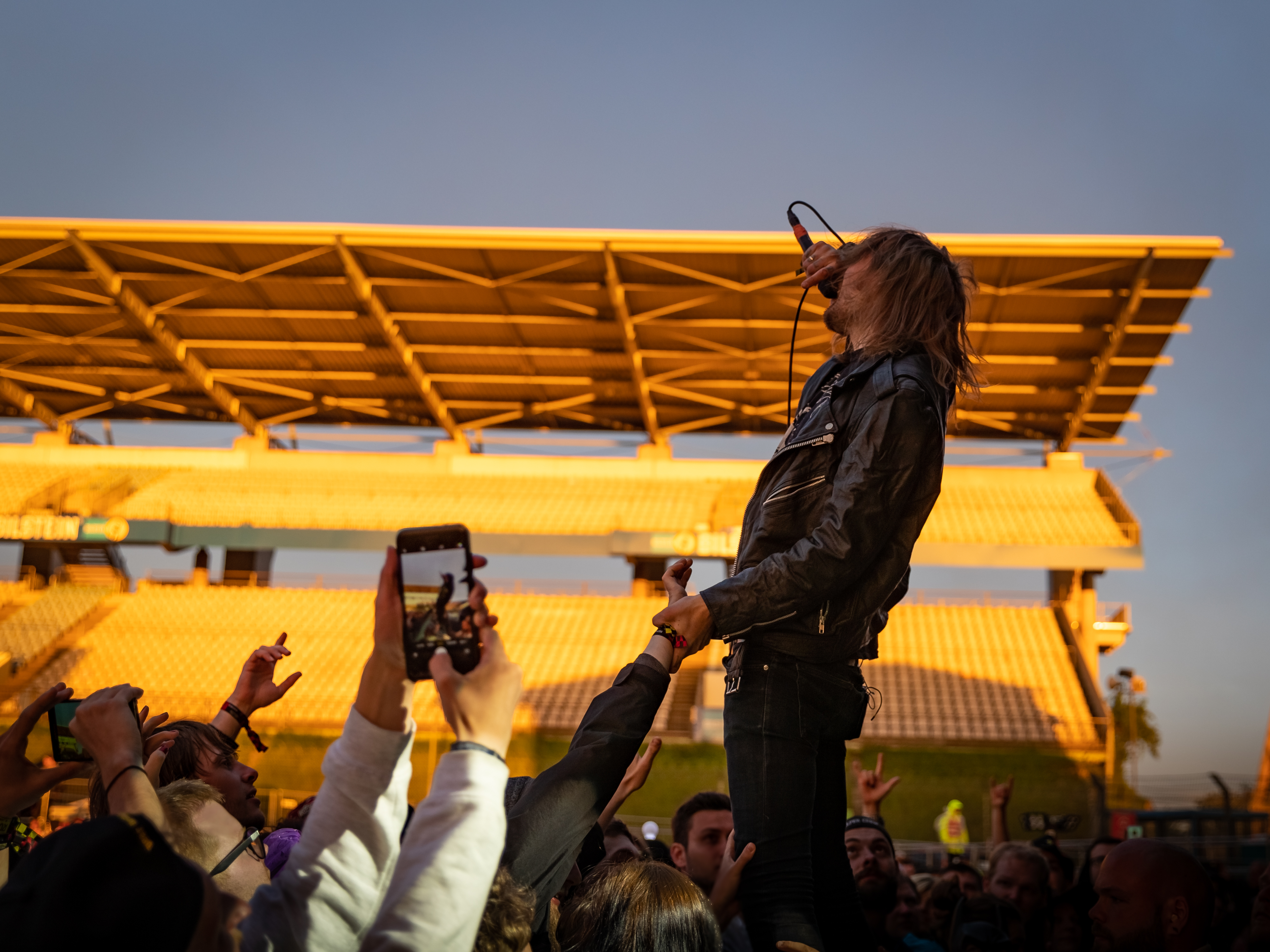
Splid is Kvelertak's first album with vocalist Ivar Nikolaisen.

== Release ==
On 27 November 2019, the first single "Bråtebrann" was released, along with the announcement of the album.

== Critical reception ==
Professional ratings
Aggregate scores
Source	Rating
AnyDecentMusic?	7.7/10
Metacritic	84/100
Review scores
Source	Rating
AllMusic	4/5 stars
Consequence of Sound	B+
Exclaim!	8/10
Kerrang!	4/5 stars
Metal Storm	8.2/10

Splid was met with "universal acclaim" from critics. At Metacritic, which assigns a weighted average rating out of 100 to reviews from mainstream publications, it received an average score of 84 based on six reviews. At AnyDecentMusic?, the release was given a 7.7 out of 10.

James Christopher Monger of AllMusic spoke on the change of the lead vocals: "The installation of a new lead singer can be fraught with danger, but Kvelertak's chassis has always been the sublime triple-guitar attack of Vidar Landa, Bjarte Lund Rolland, and Maciek Ofsad, which is set to full-on slay for album number four. Ivar Nikolaisen's first stint behind the wheel feels less like a sea change and more like a subtle changing of the guard." Michael Pementel from Consequence of Sound wrote "Over its 11 tracks, Splid consistently churns out raging banger after banger, allowing for the record to roar with metal bliss. The creativity expressed in Splid is matched by its intensity, as Kvelertak embrace the metal spirit throughout the album."

=== Year-end lists ===
Publications' year-end list appearances for Splid
Critic/Publication	List	Rank	Ref
Consequence of Sound	Top 30 Metal/Hard Rock Albums of 2020	30	
Loudwire	Top 70 Rock/Metal Albums of 2020	N/A	
Metal Hammer	The 50 Best Metal Albums of 2020	26	

== Track listing ==
Splid track listing
No.	Title	Length
1.	"Rogaland"	5:23
2.	"Crack of Doom" (featuring Troy Sanders)	3:54
3.	"Necrosoft"	3:00
4.	"Discord" (featuring Nate Newton)	4:14
5.	"Bråtebrann"	6:59
6.	"Uglas Hegemoni"	3:33
7.	"Fanden ta Dette Hull!"	7:51
8.	"Tevling"	4:08
9.	"Stevnemøte Med Satan"	4:29
10.	"Delirium Tremens"	8:11
11.	"Ved Bredden av Nihil"	6:31
Total length:		58:13

== Personnel ==
Kvelertak

- Vidar Landa – guitar, vocals
- Bjarte Lund Rolland – guitar, piano, saxophone, vocals
- Marvin Nygaard – bass, percussion, vocals
- Maciek Ofstad – lead guitar, vocals
- Ivar Nikolaisen – lead vocals
- Håvard Takle Ohr – drums

Guest musicians

- Troy Sanders – vocals on "Crack of Doom"
- Nate Newton – vocals on "Discord"

Production

- Kurt Ballou – producer, recorded by, mixed by
- Alan Douches – mastering
- Zach Weeks – recorded by

== Charts ==
Chart performance for Splid
Chart (2020)	Peak position
Finnish Albums (Suomen virallinen lista)	21
German Albums (Offizielle Top 100)	12
Norwegian Albums (VG-lista)	1
Scottish Albums (OCC)	47
Spanish Albums (PROMUSICAE)	45
Swedish Albums (Sverigetopplistan)	19
Swiss Albums (Schweizer Hitparade)	32
