= Nattesferd =

Studio album by Kvelertak
- Released: 13 May 2016
- Studio: Amper Tone Studio, Oslo, Norway
- Genre: Heavy metal, black 'n' roll
- Length: 47:06
- Language: Norwegian
- Label: Roadrunner
- Producer: Nick Terry

Kvelertak chronology
Meir (2013)	Nattesferd (2016)	Splid (2020)

Singles from Nattesferd
- 1. "1985" Released: 8 March 2016

Professional ratings
Aggregate scores
Source	Rating
Metacritic	(83/100)
Review scores
Source	Rating
AllMusic	4.5/5 stars
The A.V. Club	B+
Consequence of Sound	B
Metal Hammer	4/5 stars
MetalSucks	4.5/5 stars
Pitchfork	(8/10)
PopMatters	(8/10)
Spin	(8/10)

Nattesferd is the third studio album by Norwegian heavy metal band Kvelertak, released on 13 May 2016. The album was recorded in Oslo. It is the band's last album with vocalist Erlend Hjelvik and drummer Kjetil Gjermundrød.

== Background ==
Kvelertak released the first song "1985" on 8 March 2016. Nattesferd is the band's first album recorded in Norway. The band released music videos for the songs "1985", "Nattesferd" and "Svartmesse".

== Accolades ==
Publication	Accolade	Year	Rank	Ref.
Stereogum	The 50 Best Albums of 2016	2016	49	

== Track listing ==
No.	Title	Length
1.	"Dendrofil for Yggdrasil"	5:40
2.	"1985"	5:33
3.	"Nattesferd"	5:03
4.	"Svartmesse"	3:34
5.	"Bronsegud"	2:57
6.	"Ondskapens Galakse"	5:33
7.	"Berserkr"	4:54
8.	"Heksebrann"	9:05
9.	"Nekrodamus"	4:47

== Personnel ==
Kvelertak

- Erlend Hjelvik – vocals
- Vidar Landa – guitar
- Bjarte Lund Rolland – guitar, piano
- Maciek Ofstad – guitar, vocals
- Marvin Nygaard – bass
- Kjetil Gjermundrød – drums

Production

- Nick Terry – mixing, engineering

== Charts ==
Chart (2016)	Peak position
Australian Albums (ARIA)	99
Austrian Albums (Ö3 Austria)	44
Belgian Albums (Ultratop Flanders)	91
Belgian Albums (Ultratop Wallonia)	110
Finnish Albums (Suomen virallinen lista)	9
German Albums (Offizielle Top 100)	24
Norwegian Albums (VG-lista)	2
Swedish Albums Sverigetopplistan)	31
Swiss Albums (Schweizer Hitparade)	44
