= Donkeyboy =

Norwegian synthpop band

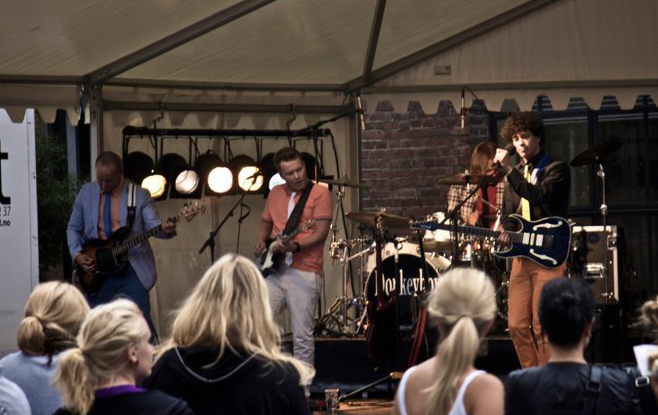
- Donkeyboy performing live in Oslo in August 2009

Background information
- Origin: Drammen, Norway
- Genres: Synthpop; electronic rock
- Years active: 2005–present
- Label: Warner Music Norway
- Members: Cato Sundberg; Kent Sundberg; Peter Michelsen; Thomas Drabløs
- Past members: Alexander Garborg Ågedal
- Website: www.donkeyboy.no

Donkeyboy (occasionally stylised as donkeyboy) is a synthpop band from Drammen, Norway, formed in 2005. The band consists of Cato Sundberg (vocals, rhythm guitar), Kent Sundberg (synth, vocals), Peter Michelsen (guitar, backing vocals) and Thomas Drabløs (drums)

== History ==
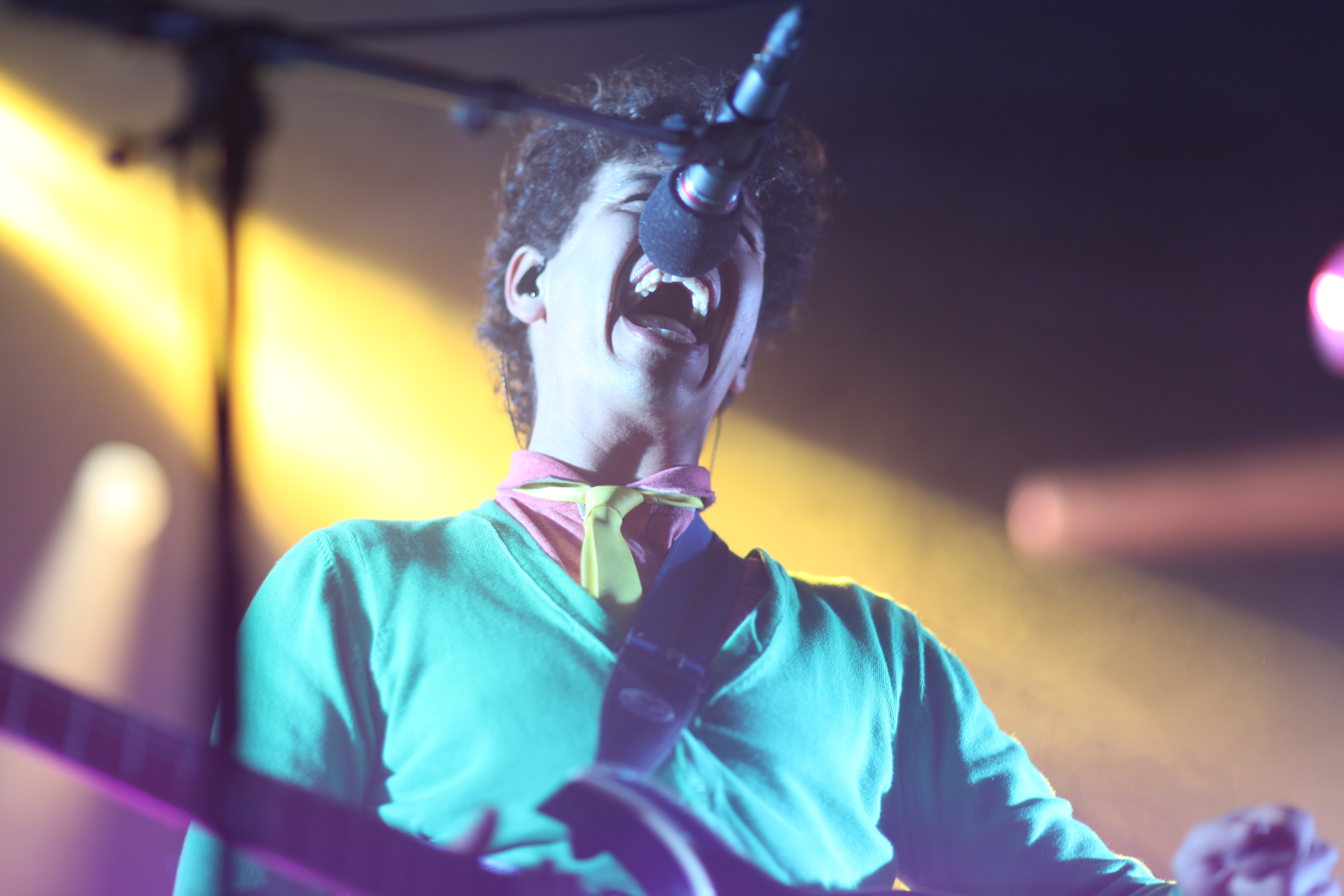
Donkeyboy release concert, 2009

Donkeyboy were signed to Warner Music after an employee came across their music on MySpace. Their debut single, "Ambitions" was released on 26 March 2009 and was put into heavy rotation by NRK P3. The song's chorus is built around a bassline similar to those used on Michael Jackson's "Billie Jean" and some of Madonna's 1980s songs. The song features guest vocals by Linnea Dale. "Ambitions" debuted on the Norwegian singles chart at number seven on 6 April 2009, and reached the number one spot on 29 June, after 13 weeks on the charts. "Ambitions" remained at the number one spot for 12 consecutive weeks, before being replaced by the band's second single "Sometimes" on September 22. This was the first time ever for a Norwegian artist to occupy the top two spots on the singles chart. Guitarist Peter Michelsen described the situation as "completely absurd".

Donkeyboy's debut album Caught in a Life was released on 19 October 2009. It was produced by Simen & Espen at Livingroom Studios in Oslo. Sven Ove Bakke of Dagbladet gave the album four out of six, and described it as "revolving around its already established hits with a combination of self-assured conviction and uneasy duteousness." He concluded that the album was overshadowed by its hit single. The band supported fellow Norwegians a-ha in the UK and Oslo legs of their Foot of the Mountain tour in November 2009, and in 2011 Donkeyboy won a European Border Breakers Award for their international success.

Donkeyboy's second album Silver Moon was released on March 2, 2012, and in 2013 they released the single "Triggerfinger" featuring vocals by Kiesza.

== Honours ==
- 2009: Three times Spellemannprisen in the categories this year's Hit song, Newcomer and Musical video, for the album Caught in a Life and the tune/video "Ambitions"

== Discography ==
=== Albums ===
Title	Album details	Peak chart positions				Certifications
Title	Album details	NOR	DEN	FIN	SWE	Certifications
Caught in a Life	Released: October 19, 2009; Label: Warner; Formats: CD, digital download	1	—	—	6	NOR: 3× Platinum
Silver Moon	Released: March 2, 2012; Label: Warner; Formats: CD, digital download	2	35	—	—	
Lost	Released: February 12, 2016; Label: Warner; Formats: CD, digital download	17	—	—	—	
"—" denotes albums which were not released in that country or failed to chart.

=== Singles ===
Year	Song	Peak chart positions				Certifications	Album
Year	Song	NOR	DEN	FIN	SWE	Certifications	Album
2009	"Ambitions"	1	—	—	1	NOR: 7× Platinum	Caught in a Life
2009	"Sometimes"	1	—	—	—	NOR: 3× Platinum	Caught in a Life
2009	"Broke My Eyes"	6	—	—	—		Caught in a Life
2009	"Awake"	8	—	—	—		Caught in a Life
2009	"Blade Running"	8	—	—	—		Caught in a Life
2010	"Stereolife"	—	—	—	—		Caught in a Life
2011	"City Boy"	1	1	7	—	DEN: Platinum	Silver Moon
2012	"Pull of the Eye"	11	—	—	—		Silver Moon
2012	"Silver Moon"	—	—	—	—		Silver Moon
2013	"Triggerfinger"	—	—	9	—		Lost
2014	"Crazy Something Normal"	13	—	—	—		Lost
2014	"Hero"	—	—	—	—		Lost
2015	"Downtown"	18	—	9	—		Lost
2015	"Lost"	36	—	—	—		Lost
2016	"Dollar"	—	—	—	—		Lost
2017	"Kaleidoscope"	—	—	—	—		Non-album single
2018	"It'll Be Alright"	—	—	—	—		Non-album single
2019	"Think You Should" (feat. Linnea Dale)	—	—	—	—		Non-album single
2021	"Kentucky"	—	—	—	—		Non-album single
2025	"Galileo"	—	—	—	—		Non-album single
2025	"Galactical Love"	—	—	—	—		Non-album single
2025	"Norwegian Girl"	—	—	—	—		Non-album single
2026	"Flash of Light"	—	—	—	—		Non-album single
"—" denotes singles which were not released in that country or failed to chart.

Awards
Preceded by Ida Maria	Recipient of the Newcomer Spellemannprisen; 2009	Succeeded by Kvelertak
