= Meir (album) =

Studio album by Kvelertak
- Released: 25 March 2013
- Recorded: Mid-2012 at GodCity Studios in Salem, Massachusetts, US
- Genre: Black 'n' roll; hardcore punk; heavy metal
- Length: 49:05
- Language: Norwegian
- Label: Sony Music (Scandinavia); Roadrunner (International); Indie (vinyl)
- Producer: Kurt Ballou

Kvelertak chronology
Kvelertak (2010)	Meir (2013)	Nattesferd (2016)

Singles from Meir
- 1. "Bruane Brenn" Released: 8 January 2013

Meir is the second studio album by Norwegian heavy metal band Kvelertak. It was released on 25 March 2013 (26 March in the US) via Sony Music Scandinavia in Scandinavia, Roadrunner Records in the rest of the world, and by Indie Recordings on vinyl. The album was produced by Kurt Ballou.

== Background ==
Meir (Norwegian for "more") was recorded at GodCity Studios in Salem, Massachusetts, United States and produced by Kurt Ballou of Converge. The cover artwork was created by John Dyer Baizley of the band Baroness. The band released music videos for "Bruane Brenn", "Månelyst" and the self-titled track "Kvelertak".

In 2017, Rolling Stone ranked Meir as 96th on their list of 'The 100 Greatest Metal Albums of All Time.'

Professional ratings
Aggregate scores
Source	Rating
Metacritic	84/100
Review scores
Source	Rating
AllMusic	5/5 stars
Classic Rock	4/5 stars
Decibel	8/10
Loudwire	3.5/5 stars
musicOMH	4.5/5 stars
Outburn	10/10
Pitchfork	7.2/10
The Skinny	4/5 stars
Spin	8/10
Sputnikmusic	4.2/5

== Track listing ==
No.	Title	Length
1.	"Åpenbaring"	3:06
2.	"Spring fra livet"	3:34
3.	"Trepan"	3:39
4.	"Bruane brenn"	4:07
5.	"Evig vandrar"	2:48
6.	"Snilepisk"	2:52
7.	"Månelyst"	3:10
8.	"Nekrokosmos"	6:40
9.	"Undertro"	6:25
10.	"Tordenbrak"	8:53
11.	"Kvelertak"	3:49

== Personnel ==
Kvelertak

- Erlend Hjelvik – vocals
- Vidar Landa – guitar
- Bjarte Lund Rolland – guitar, piano, vocals
- Maciek Ofstad – guitar, vocals
- Marvin Nygaard – bass
- Kjetil Gjermundrød – drums, percussion

Guest musicians

- Ashley Rose Redshaw – backing vocals ("Spring Fra Livet" and "Nekrokosmos")

Production and recording

- Kurt Ballou – mixing, production

=== Weekly charts ===
Chart (2013)	Peak position
Belgian Albums Chart (Flanders)	176
Finnish Albums Chart	18
German Albums Chart	64
VG-lista Norwegian Albums Chart	1
Sverigetopplistan Swedish Albums Chart	20
Swiss Albums Chart	100
