= Kvelertak =

Norwegian metal band

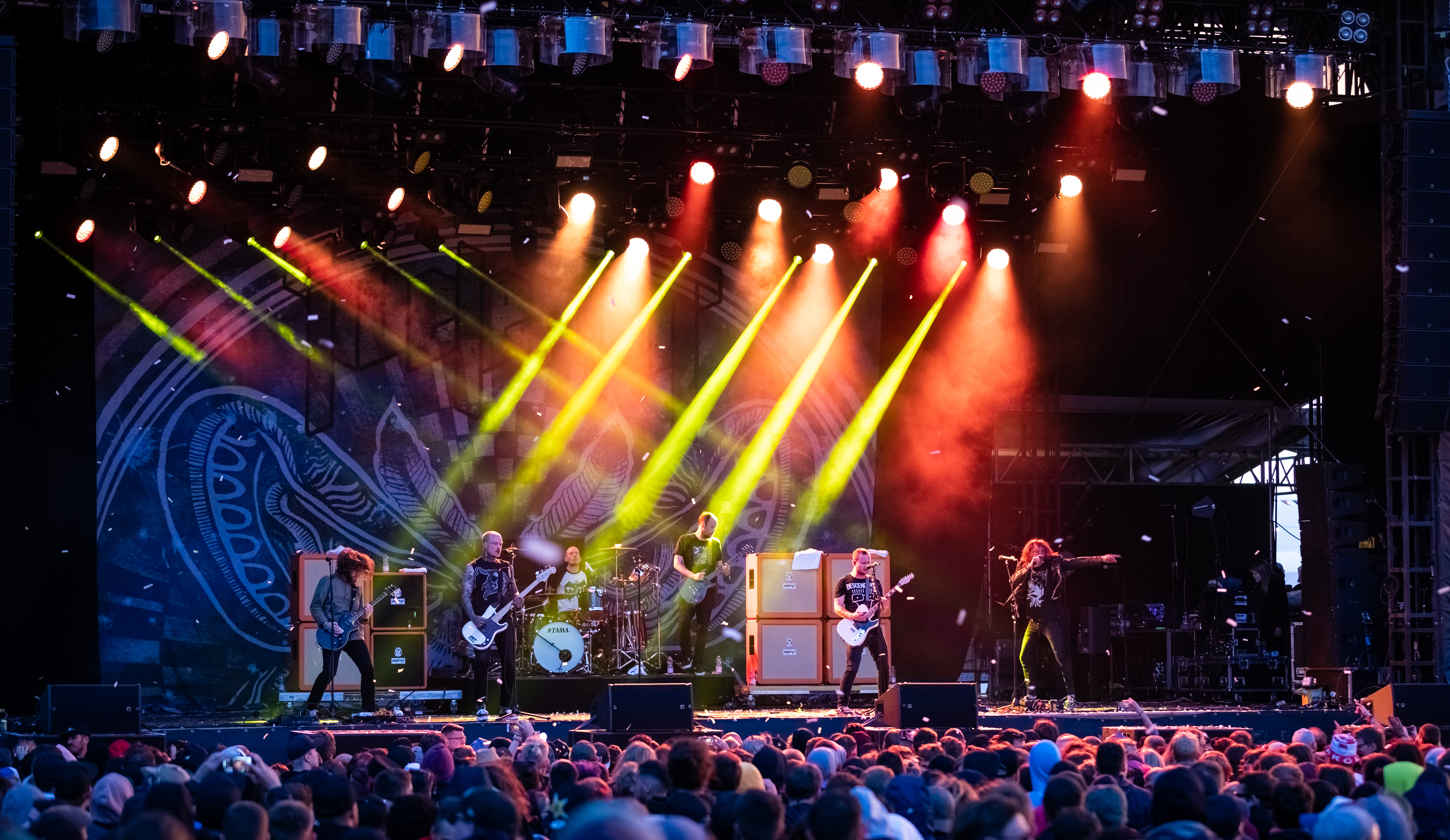
- Kvelertak performing in 2019

Background information
- Origin: Stavanger, Norway
- Genres: Black 'n' roll; hardcore punk; hard rock
- Years active: 2007–present
- Labels: The End; Roadrunner; Sony Music Scandinavia; Rise; Petroleum
- Members: Ivar Nikolaisen; Vidar Landa; Maciek Ofstad; Marvin Nygaard; Håvard Takle Ohr
- Past members: Erlend Hjelvik; Anders Mosness; Kjetil Gjermundrød; Bjarte Lund Rolland
- Website: kvelertak.com
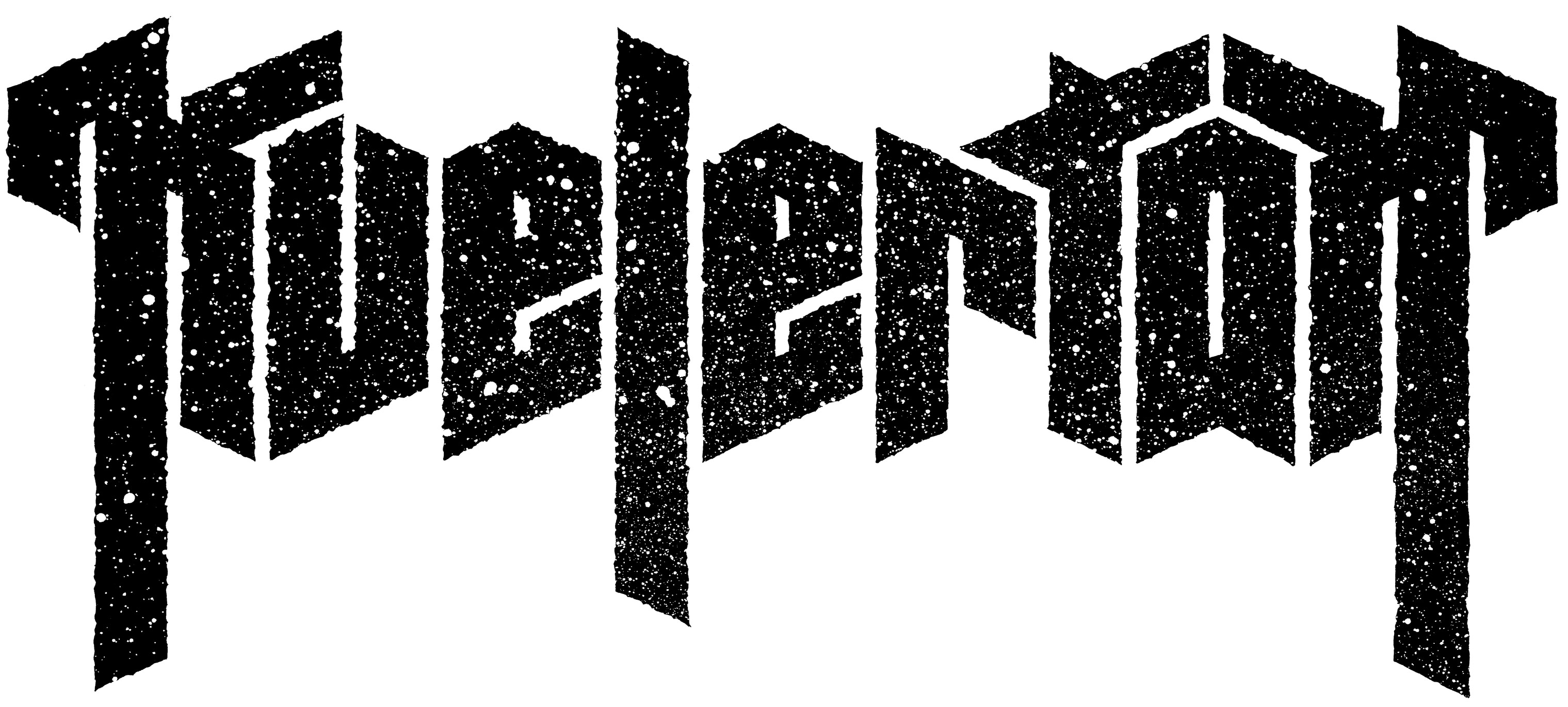

Kvelertak (Norwegian for 'stranglehold') is a Norwegian band that plays rock and roll, black metal and punk. Formed in Stavanger in 2007, the group comprises vocalist Ivar Nikolaisen, guitarists Vidar Landa and Maciek Ofstad, bassist Marvin Nygaard, and drummer Håvard Takle Ohr. Founding member and lead singer Erlend Hjelvik left the group in 2018, replaced with Ivar Nikolaisen. Most of Kvelertak's songs have Norwegian lyrics.

The band's self-titled debut album was released in 2010 and sold more than 15,000 copies in Norway. The second album, Meir, was released in 2013, followed by Nattesferd in 2016, Splid in 2020 and Endling in 2023. Splid was the band's first album with Ivar Nikolaisen on lead vocals.

== History ==
=== Formation and debut album (2007–2011) ===
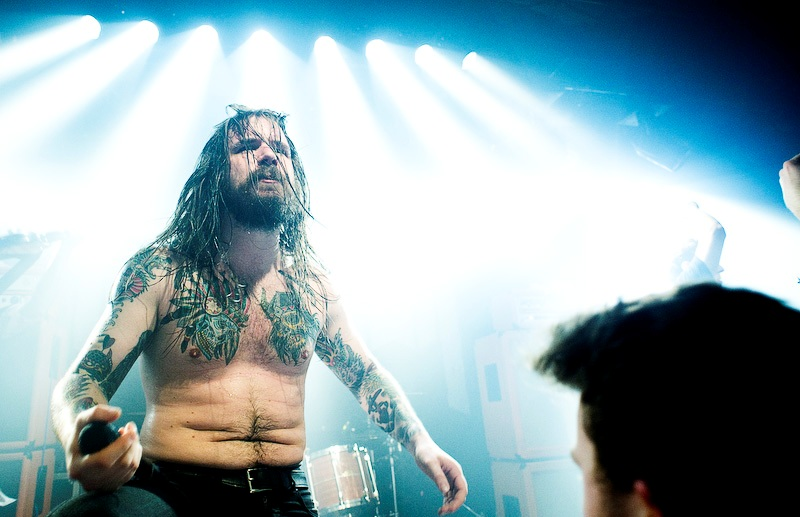
Former vocalist Erlend Hjelvik

Kvelertak were formed in Stavanger in 2007. The demo Westcoast Holocaust was self-released that year. The band released their debut album, Kvelertak, on 21 June 2010, via Indie Recordings, and on 15 March via The End Records in North America. The album was certified gold by IFPI in Norway for selling over 15,000 copies.

In March 2011, Kvelertak won two Spellemannprisen Awards, a Norwegian music award similar to the American Grammy Award—for Best Newcomer and Best Rock Band. The Kvelertak song "Mjød" was used as the end music for the film The Troll Hunter.

=== Meir and Nattesferd (2012–2017) ===
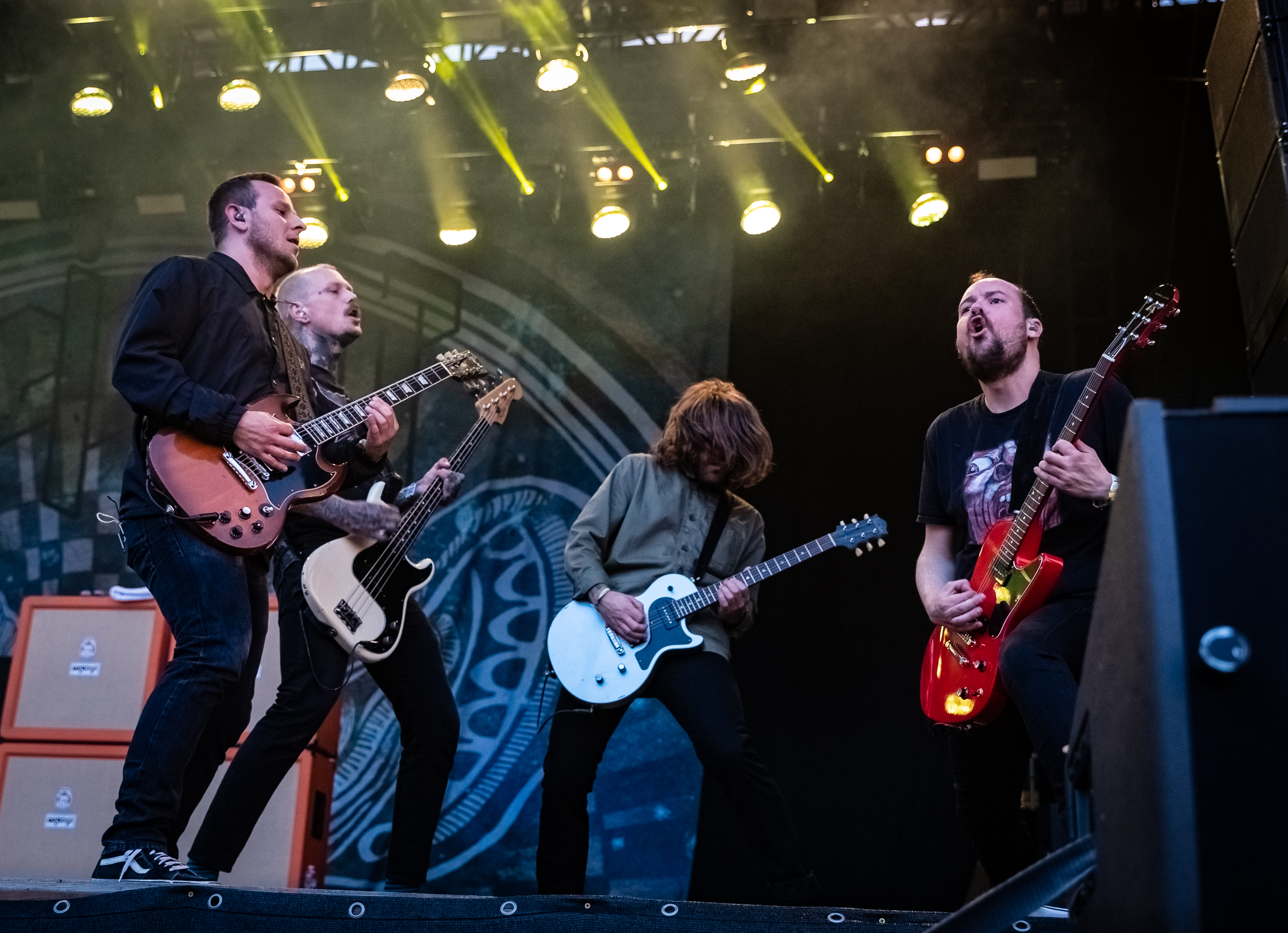
Kvelertak in 2019

The second album, Meir, was released on 25 March 2013 (26 March in the US) via Sony Music Scandinavia in Scandinavia, Roadrunner Records in the rest of the world, and by Indie Recordings on vinyl. Kvelertak has attracted a following from artists such as Metallica frontman James Hetfield who, along with Norwegian Crown Prince Haakon, watched the band perform in San Francisco. Hetfield posted a video on his Instagram account of him watching the band and describing Hjelvik as a "savage" frontman. Marvin Nygaard was voted sexiest man in Norway in 2013

The band's third studio album, Nattesferd, was released on 13 May 2016. They opened for Metallica on their WorldWired Tour between September 2017 and May 2018 in Europe, and opened for Ghost on their Popestar Tour in 2017.

=== Lineup change and Splid (2018–present) ===
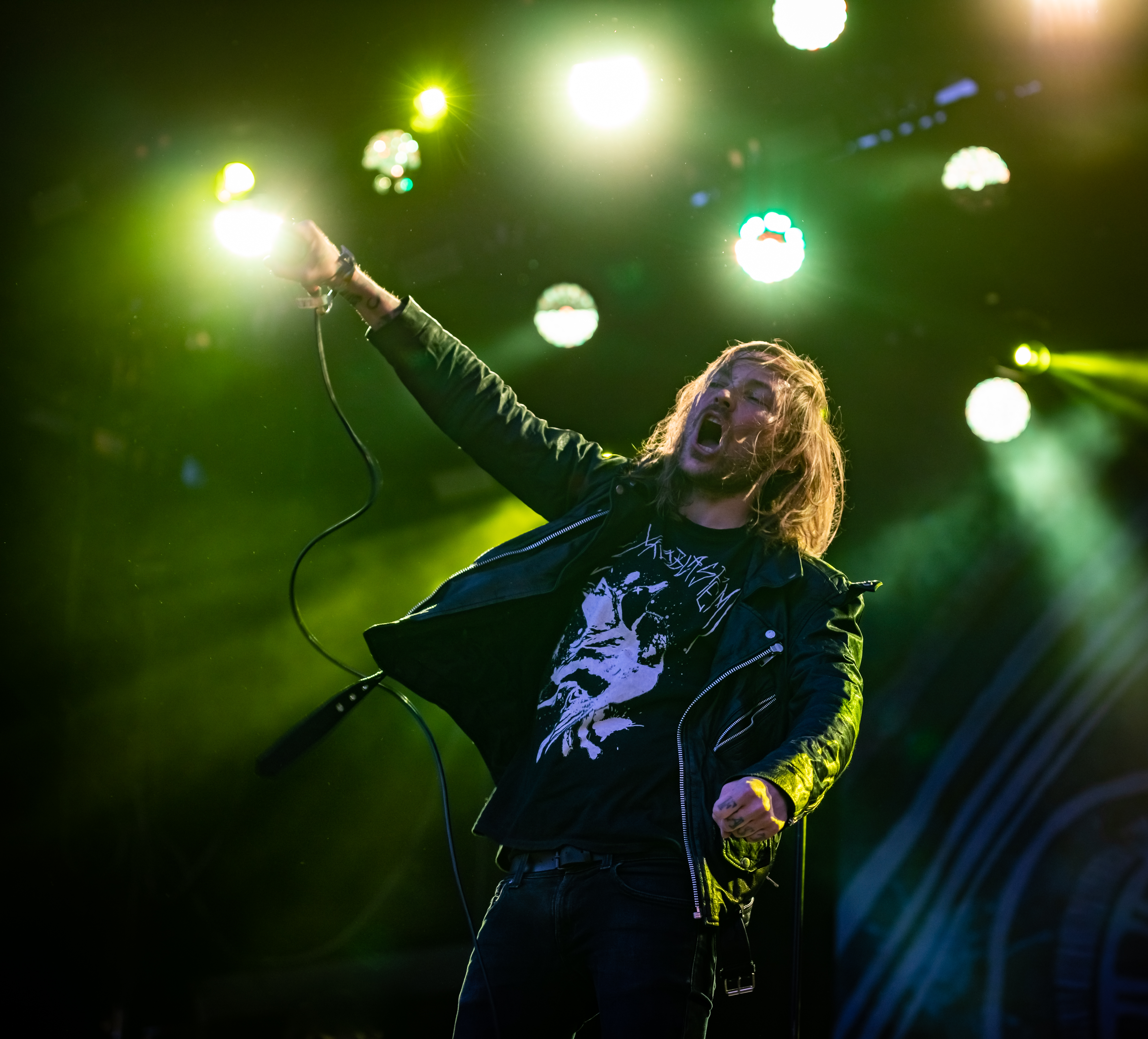
Ivar Nikolaisen in 2019

In July 2018, Hjelvik left the band. His replacement, Ivar Nikolaisen (of Silver and The Good, The Bad and The Zugly), was announced on 20 July at their show in Fjellparkfestivalen, Flekkefjord – he had previously guested vocals on "Blodtørst".

Kvelertak released Splid on 14 February 2020. Hjelvik released a solo album, Welcome to Hel, on 20 November 2020.

Kvelertak released Endling on 8 September 2023.

Guitarist Bjarte Lund Rolland left the band in October 2024, after his right index finger was worn out from years of playing guitar without a pick.

== Awards ==
- 2010: Two times Spellemannprisen in the categories best Rock band and this years Newcomer, for the self-titled album Kvelertak

== Band members ==
Current members

- Vidar Landa – guitar (2007–present)
- Marvin Nygaard – bass, backing vocals (2007–present)
- Maciek Ofstad – guitar, backing vocals (2009–present)
- Ivar Nikolaisen – lead vocals (2018–present)
- Håvard Takle Ohr – drums (2019–present)

Past members

- Bjarte Lund Rolland – guitar, backing vocals, keyboards (2007–2024)
- Erlend Hjelvik – lead vocals (2007–2018)
- Anders Mosness – guitar (2007–2009), drums (2007–2008)
- Kjetil Gjermundrød – drums (2008–2019)

Others

- Jay Weinberg – drums (live) (2013)
- Eirik Melstrøm – guitar (live) (2023)

== Discography ==
=== Studio albums ===
- Kvelertak (2010)
- Meir (2013)
- Nattesferd (2016)
- Splid (2020)
- Endling (2023)

=== EPs ===
- Gojira/Kvelertak Live (2013, split with Gojira)

=== Singles ===
- "Mjød" (2010)
- "Blodtørst" (2010)
- "Bruane brenn" (2013)
- "Kvelertak" (2013)
- "1985" (2016)
- "Berserkr" (2016)
- "Bråtebrann" (2019)
- "Crack of Doom" (feat. Troy Sanders) (2020)
- "Fanden ta dette hull!" (2020)
- "Krøterveg Te Helvete" (2023)

=== Demos ===
- Westcoast Holocaust (2007)

Awards
Preceded by John Olav Nilsen & Gjengen	Recipient of the rock Spellemannprisen; 2010	Succeeded by Honningbarna
Preceded by Donkeyboy	Recipient of the newcomer Spellemannprisen; 2010	Succeeded by Jonas Alaska
Preceded by Nekromantheon	Recipient of the metal Spellemannprisen; 2013	Succeeded by Execration
Preceded by Beglomeg	Recipient of the rock Spellemannprisen; 2016	Succeeded by Sløtface
