= The Chronicles of Narnia: The Voyage of the Dawn Treader (soundtrack) =

The Chronicles of Narnia: The Voyage of the Dawn Treader (Original Motion Picture Soundtrack)

Film score by David Arnold
- Released: December 7, 2010
- Recorded: September–October 2010
- Genre: Film score
- Length: 71:52 (excluding songs)
- Label: Sony Classical
- Producers: David Arnold; Geoff Foster

Alternate cover

The Chronicles of Narnia: The Voyage of the Dawn Treader (Original Motion Picture Soundtrack) is the soundtrack to the film The Chronicles of Narnia: The Voyage of the Dawn Treader. David Arnold composed the soundtrack, which was released on December 7, 2010 in the United States by Sony Classical.

The song "There's a Place for Us" by Carrie Underwood was nominated for Best Original Song at the 68th Golden Globe Awards.

== Background ==
It was announced on October 9, 2007 that award-winning composer David Arnold would score the film with the themes composed by Harry Gregson-Williams (who scored The Lion, The Witch and The Wardrobe and Prince Caspian). It was Arnold's fourth collaboration with Apted after The World Is Not Enough, Enough and Amazing Grace. The second trailer for The Voyage of the Dawn Treader uses identical music to the trailer for The Lion, the Witch and the Wardrobe.

As the previous films were distributed by Disney, the soundtracks for those films were released by Walt Disney Records. However, this film was distributed by 20th Century Fox (which is now owned by Disney), and the soundtrack was released by Sony Music.

== Recording ==
=== Score ===
Arnold worked with an 87-piece Orchestra and a 40-piece choir to record the score for the film. He also worked with Paul Apted (Michael Apted's son) in editing the score, remarking that it was "going to be epic.". Arnold chose not to collaborate with Lisbeth Scott, whose vocals are used to the first two films. He created specific themes for The Dawn Treader and Reepicheep. In order for the film to be consistent with the franchise, he chose to use the previous themes by Gregson-Williams for the opening and closing scenes, as well as for scenes featuring some recurring characters, such as Aslan.

The scoring sessions took place during September 2010 and were completed on October 8, 2010.

=== Songs ===
Carrie Underwood recorded a song entitled "There's a Place for Us", which she co-wrote with David Hodges and Hillary Lindsey, that was released on November 16, 2010 as a lead single and can only be purchased exclusive on iTunes. It has sold 77,000 copies as of January 20, 2010. This song was also covered by various artists for international releases of the film, including E.M.D., Xander de Buisonjé, Sergey Lazarev, Victoria S., Sonohra, and Joe McElderry, who released it as the b-track to his single "Someone Wake Me Up".

Sreeram Chandra recorded a song entitled "Rehnuma" in Hindi, Tamil, and Telugu which was featured for the Indian release of the film. Australian singer Stan Walker also recorded an original song "Stand Up" for the film's Australian release.

== Track listing ==
All music is composed by David Arnold.

No.	Title	Length
1.	"Opening Titles"	1:07
2.	"The Painting"	2:27
3.	"High King and Queen of Narnia"	1:33
4.	"Reepicheep"	0:58
5.	"Land Ahoy"	1:43
6.	"The Lone Island"	1:51
7.	"Lord Bern"	1:01
8.	"The Green Mist"	1:15
9.	"Market Forces"	1:53
10.	"1st Sword"	1:17
11.	"Eustace on Deck"	1:10
12.	"Duel"	1:44
13.	"The Magician's Island"	4:03
14.	"Lucy and the Invisible Mansion"	5:24
15.	"Coriakin and the Map"	2:57
16.	"Temptation of Lucy"	1:16
17.	"Aslan Appears"	0:49
18.	"The Golden Cavern"	2:03
19.	"Temptation of Edmund"	1:57
20.	"Dragon's Treasure"	2:53
21.	"Dragon Attack"	2:29
22.	"Under the Stars"	2:55
23.	"Blue Star"	1:03
24.	"Aslan's Table"	2:32
25.	"Liliandil and the Dark Island"	1:30
26.	"The Calm Before the Storm"	1:49
27.	"Into Battle"	11:02
28.	"Sweet Water"	2:05
29.	"Ship to Shore"	3:52
30.	"Time to Go Home"	2:47

iTunes Exclusive Edition
No.	Title	Writer(s)	Length
31.	"There's a Place for Us" (performed by Carrie Underwood)	Underwood, David Hodges, Hillary Lindsey	3:53

=== International versions ===
United Kingdom Edition
No.	Title	Writer(s)	Length
31.	"There's a Place for Us" (performed by Joe McElderry)	Hodges, Lindsey, Underwood	3:53
32.	"Someone Wake Me Up" (performed by Joe McElderry)	Liam Keenan, Ben Collier, Ray Hedges, Nigel Butler	3:32

Swedish Edition
No.	Title	Writer(s)	Length
31.	"There's a Place for Us" (performed by E.M.D.)	Hodges, Lindsey, Underwood	3:53

Russian Edition
No.	Title	Writer(s)	Length
31.	"There's a Place for Us" (performed by Sergey Lazarev)	Hodges, Lindsey, Underwood
32.	"Instantly (performed by Sergey Lazarev)"	Okiem Warmann

Australian Edition
No.	Title	Writer(s)	Length
31.	"Stand Up" (performed by Stan Walker)	James Reid	3:34

Italian Edition
No.	Title	Writer(s)	Length
31.	"There's a Place for Us (performed by Sonohra)" (performed by Sonohra)	Hodges, Lindsey, Underwood	3:45

German Edition
No.	Title	Writer(s)	Length
31.	"There's a Place for Us" (performed by Victoria S)	Hodges, Lindsey, Underwood	3:46

Indian Edition
No.	Title	Writer(s)	Length
31.	"Rehnuma" (performed by Sreeram Chandra)	Sreeram Chandra	2:37

Dutch Edition
No.	Title	Writer(s)	Length
31.	"There's a Place for Us" (performed by Xander de Buisonjé)	Hodges, Lindsey, Underwood	N/A

French Edition
No.	Title	Writer(s)	Length
31.	"There's a Place for Us" (performed by Sonohra)	Hodges, Lindsey, Underwood	N/A

Spanish Edition
No.	Title	Writer(s)	Length
31.	"There's a Place for Us" (performed by Sonohra)	Hodges, Lindsey, Underwood	N/A

== Reception ==
Professional ratings
Review scores
Source	Rating
Allmusic	3.5/5 stars

The soundtrack had met with generally favourable reviews from critics. Allmusic.com gave the soundtrack 3½ stars out of 5, saying

"Voyage of the Dawn Treader, the third installment in Walden Media's popular Chronicles of Narnia series, features the work of Grammy Award-winning composer David Arnold (Casino Royale, Independence Day). Arnold, who has taken the reins from previous author Harry Gregson-Williams, incorporates many of the latter composer’s main themes, which, when paired with Arnold’s more frenetic, modern action cues, echo the third act’s penchant for pure unadulterated fantasy. Arnold truly makes the score his own on the 11-minute “Into Battle” sequence, which boasts some truly impressive Wagnerian choral sections."

== Personnel ==
- David Arnold - Primary Artist, Track Performer, Composer, Score Producer, Choir Contractor
- Nicholas Dodd - Conductor
- Frank Ricotti - Ethnic Percussion
- Dermot Crehan - Irish Fiddle
- Mauricio Venegas - Woodwind
- Paul Clarvis - Ethnic Percussion
- Jan Hendrickse - Penny Whistle, Duduk
- Synergy Vocals - Choir, Chorus
- King Alfred School Girls' Choir - Girl's Choir
- Green Mist Choir - Choir, Chorus
- Byron Wallon - Ram's Horn
- Nicholas Dodd - Orchestration
- John Bradbury - Orchestra Leader
- Michael Price - Additional Music
- Geoff Foster - Score Producer, Engineering
- Rob Playford - MIDI Tech, Computer Engineering
- Ray Staff - Mastering
- Tom Cavanaugh - Music Business Affairs
- Harry Gregson-Williams - Composer
- Chris Barrett - Recording Assistant
- Micaela Haslam - Choir Contractor
- Chris Cozens - Auricle Programming
- Mark Cavell - Licensing
- Matt Robertson - MIDI Programming
- Adam Miller - Recording Assistant
- Isabelle Tulliez - Product Development
- Jo Buckley - Assistant Contractor
- Jenny O'Grady - Choir Contractor
- Stu Kennedy - MIDI Programming
- David Hearn - MIDI Programming
