= Kvelertak (album) =

Studio album by Kvelertak
- Released: 21 June 2010
- Recorded: February–March 2010 at GodCity Studios in Salem, Massachusetts, US
- Genre: Black 'n' roll; extreme metal
- Length: 48:36
- Language: Norwegian, English (track 5)
- Label: Indie Recordings
- Producer: Kurt Ballou

Kvelertak chronology
Westcoast Holocaust (2007)	Kvelertak (2010)	Meir (2013)

Singles from Kvelertak
- 1. "Mjød" Released: 31 May 2010; 2. "Blodtørst" Released: 27 September 2010

Professional ratings
Review scores
Source	Rating
AllMusic	4/5 stars
About.com	4.5/5 stars
Blabbermouth.net	9/10 stars

Kvelertak is the debut album by the Norwegian band Kvelertak, released on 21 June 2010 through Indie Recordings. The album was released in North America on 15 March 2011 through The End Records with six bonus tracks—four live recordings from the group's BBC sessions and two demo tracks.

After performing in Oslo, Norway on 24 June 2011, Kvelertak were presented with a gold record certification by Indie Recordings and Dave Grohl of Foo Fighters (the headlining band of the concert). Kvelertak was certified gold by the International Federation of the Phonographic Industry for selling more than 15,000 copies.

The cover artwork was created by John Dyer Baizley of the band Baroness.

== Track listing ==
All songs written and composed by Kvelertak.

No.	Title	Length
1.	"Ulvetid" (featuring Hoest of Taake)	3:29
2.	"Mjød"	2:30
3.	"Fossegrim"	3:32
4.	"Blodtørst" (featuring Ivar Nikolaisen of Absurd², Happy Dagger, Silver)	3:37
5.	"Offernatt" (featuring Ryan McKenney of Trap Them)	4:29
6.	"Sjøhyenar (Havets Herrer)"	4:50
7.	"Sultans of Satan"	4:35
8.	"Nekroskop" (featuring Andreas Tylden of Altaar and One Tail, One Head)	5:10
9.	"Liktorn"	5:35
10.	"Ordsmedar av Rang"	4:27
11.	"Utrydd Dei Svake"	6:22

== Personnel ==
Kvelertak

- Erlend Hjelvik – vocals
- Vidar Landa – guitar, gang vocals
- Bjarte Lund Rolland – guitar, piano, vocals (on "Sultans of Satan"), gang vocals
- Maciek Ofstad – guitar, vocals (on "Sjøhyenar (Havets Herrer)"), gang vocals
- Marvin Nygaard – bass, gang vocals
- Kjetil Gjermundrød – drums, percussion, gang vocals

Guest musicians

- Ryan McKenney – vocals (on "Offernatt")
- Ivar Nikolaisen – vocals (on "Blodtørst")
- Andreas Tylden – vocals (on "Nekroskop")
- Hoest – vocals (on "Ulvetid")

Production and recording

- Kurt Ballou – mixing, production
- Alan Douches – mastering

Artwork and design

- John Dyer Baizley – artwork
- Marcelo HVC – layout
