= There's a Place for Us (song) =

2010 single by Carrie Underwood

Single by Carrie Underwood

from the album The Chronicles of Narnia: The Voyage of the Dawn Treader
- Released: November 16, 2010
- Length: 3:53
- Label: Sony Classical
- Songwriters: Carrie Underwood; David Hodges; Hillary Lindsey
- Producer: Mark Bright

Carrie Underwood singles chronology
| "Mama's Song" (2010) | "There's a Place for Us" (2010) | "Remind Me" (2011) |

"There's a Place for Us" is a song written by David Hodges, Hillary Lindsey, and co-written and recorded by American country artist Carrie Underwood for the soundtrack of the 2010 film The Chronicles of Narnia: The Voyage of the Dawn Treader. The song was performed by other artists for country-specific releases outside the United States. The song was nominated for Best Original Song at the 68th Golden Globe Awards.

== Release and reception ==
It was released on November 16, 2010 as the soundtrack's lead single, and can be purchased exclusively through iTunes. It has sold 77,000 copies as of January 18, 2011. The song did not enter the Billboard Hot 100 but peaked at number 7 on the Bubbling Under Hot 100 Singles extension chart. It also entered two digital charts tracked by Billboard — at number 64 on the Hot Canadian Digital Songs (component of Canadian Hot 100) and at number 11 on Country Digital Songs (component of Hot Country Songs).

== Chart positions ==
| Chart (2010) | Peak Position |
|---|---|
| Hot Canadian Digital Songs (Billboard) | 64 |
| US Bubbling Under Hot 100 (Billboard) | 7 |
| US Country Digital Songs (Billboard) | 11 |

== Joe McElderry version ==
"There's a Place for Us"

Single by Joe McElderry

from the album The Chronicles of Narnia: The Voyage of the Dawn Treader
- A-side: "Someone Wake Me Up"
- Released: December 6, 2010
- Genre: Pop, country pop
- Length: 3:53
- Label: Syco
- Songwriters: Carrie Underwood, David Hodges, Hillary Lindsey

Joe McElderry singles chronology
| "Someone Wake Me Up" (2010) | "There's a Place for Us" (2010) | "Last Christmas" (2011) |

Joe McElderry recorded the song for a United Kingdom release. It was released on December 6, 2010 as the b-side to McElderry's "Someone Wake Me Up" where it sold over 7,000 copies. Due to Sony Music's tight recording schedule, McElderry accidentally sang "king and queen" in the chorus instead of the printed lyric, "kings and queens" (referring to the kings and queens of Narnia), although attempts were made to electronically correct this in post-production.

== Versions ==
Various versions of the song "There's a Place for Us" are featured in international versions of the soundtrack, used to promote artists signed to Sony Music in different marketing regions. Many of these artists became famous as a result of various reality TV talent shows, such as American Idol in the case of Carrie Underwood, X Factor in the UK for Joe McElderry, and Swedish Idol in the case of E.M.D.

| Singer(s) | Country |
|---|---|
| Carrie Underwood | United States, Canada, Philippines, Australia, New Zealand |
| Joe McElderry | United Kingdom |
| E.M.D. | Sweden |
| Sergey Lazarev | Russia and Ukraine |
| Sonohra | Italy, France and Spain |
| Victoria S | Germany, Austria, Switzerland |
| Xander de Buisonjé | Dutch language countries and Netflix English release in Korea |
