= Caught in a Life =

Studio album by Donkeyboy
- Released: 19 October 2009
- Genre: Alternative rock Indie pop
- Language: English
- Label: Warner Music Group
- Producer: Simen M Eriksrud; Espen Berg

Donkeyboy chronology
Caught in a Life (2009)	Silver Moon (2012)

Singles from Donkeyboy
- 1. "Ambitions" Released: 26 March 2009; 2. "Sometimes" Released: 11 September 2009; 3. "Broke My Eyes" Released: 5 October 2009; 4. "Awake" Released: 12 October 2009; 5. "Blade Running" Released: 19 October 2009; 6. "Stereolife" Released: 22 March 2010

Caught in a Life is Norwegian band Donkeyboy's debut album from October 2009. It was produced by Simen M Eriksrud and Espen Berg at Livingroom Studios, Oslo. It topped the Norwegian Albums Chart in the winter of 2009.

It was released on 19 October 2009. The album has produced for the band two #1 hit singles on the Norwegian Singles Chart, "Ambitions" that stayed on top of the Norwegian charts for 13 weeks, followed by "Sometimes" that stayed on the top of the same charts for another 8 weeks, both in 2009. "Ambitions" also topped the Swedish Singles Chart in February 2010.

There were three more singles from the album that reached the Top 10, namely "Broke My Eyes" that reached #6, "Awake" that reached #8 and "Blade Running" that also reached #8.

In early 2010, "Stereolife" has been released as a single.

== Track listing ==
No.	Title	Writer(s)	Length
1.	"Stereolife"	Cato Sundberg/Kent Sundberg/Simen M Eriksrud	3:07
2.	"Ambitions"	Cato Sundberg/Kent Sundberg/Simen M Eriksrud/Simone Larsen	3:09
3.	"Awake"	Cato Sundberg/Kent Sundberg/Simen M Eriksrud	2:58
4.	"Broke My Eyes"	Cato Sundberg/Kent Sundberg	5:03
5.	"Sleep in Silence"	Cato Sundberg/Kent Sundberg/Simen M Eriksrud	4:18
6.	"Blade Running"	Cato Sundberg/Kent Sundberg	3:35
7.	"Sometimes"	Cato Sundberg/Kent Sundberg/Simen M Eriksrud	3:11
8.	"Promise Kept"	Cato Sundberg/Kent Sundberg/Simen M Eriksrud	3:20
9.	"We Can't Hide"	Cato Sundberg/Kent Sundberg	3:58
10.	"Caught in a Life"	Cato Sundberg/Kent Sundberg	4:04
