= Silver Moon (album) =

Studio album by Donkeyboy
- Released: 2 March 2012 (Livingroom Studio, Soundbay Studio, Norsk Lydstudio and Eccentric Studio)
- Recorded: April–December 2011
- Genre: Electropop
- Label: Warner
- Producer: Simen Eriksrud, Espen Berg, Soundbay, Thomas Eriksen, George Tanderø, Thomas Eriksen, Lasse Michelsen

Donkeyboy chronology
Caught in a Life (2009)	Silver Moon (2012)

Singles from Silver Moon
- 1. "City Boy" Released: 29 November 2011; 2. "Pull of the Eye" Released: 27 February 2012

Silver Moon is the second studio album by Norwegian pop group Donkeyboy, released on 2 March 2012 by Warner Music. The album peaked at number 2 on the Norwegian Albums Chart and number 35 on the Danish Albums Chart.

== Singles ==
- "City Boy" was released as the lead single on 29 November 2011, which became a number-one hit in Denmark and Norway.
- "Pull of the Eye" was released as the second single from the album on 27 February 2012.
- "Silver Moon" was released as the 3rd single from the album on 10 August 2012.

== Track listing ==
No.	Title	Writer(s)	Producer(s)	Length
1.	"Silver Moon"	Cato Sundberg, Kent Sundberg, Espen Berg	Simen Eriksrud, Espen Berg	3:42
2.	"City Boy"	C. Sundberg, K. Sundberg, Berg, Simen Eriksrud	Simen Eriksrud, Espen Berg, Soundbay*	3:25
3.	"Drive"	C. Sundberg, K. Sundberg	Soundbay	4:05
4.	"Get Up"	C. Sundberg, K. Sundberg, Berg, Eriksrud	Simen Eriksrud, Espen Berg	3:56
5.	"Out of Control"	C. Sundberg, K. Sundberg, Alexander Garborg Ågedal, Berg, Eriksrud, Simone Larsen	Simen Eriksrud, Espen Berg, Soundbay*	3:26
6.	"No More Movies"	C. Sundberg, K. Sundberg	Soundbay	3:09
7.	"Pull of the Eye"	C. Sundberg, K. Sundberg, Eriksrud, Larsen	Simen Eriksrud, Espen Berg	3:03
8.	"On Fire"	C. Sundberg, K. Sundberg, Thomas Eriksen	Thomas Eriksen, Soundbay*	3:33
9.	"All Up to You"	C. Sundberg, K. Sundberg, George Tanderø	George Tanderø, Soundbay*	3:26
10.	"Darkest Night"	C. Sundberg, K. Sundberg, Berg, Eriksrud	Simen Eriksrud, Espen Berg	3:59
11.	"We Can Be Friends"	C. Sundberg, K. Sundberg, Berg, Eriksrud, Larsen	Simen Eriksrud, Espen Berg	3:17
12.	"Stay"	K. Sundberg, Lasse Michelsen, Peter Michelsen	Lasse Michelsen, co-prod Thomas Eriksen	3:50

(*) denotes co-producer

- Credits adapted from album liner notes.

== Charts ==
Chart (2012)	Peak position
Danish Albums Chart	35
Norwegian Albums Chart	2

=== Weekly charts ===
"City Boy"
Chart (2011)	Peak position
Denmark (Tracklisten)	1
Finland (Suomen virallinen lista)	7
Norway (VG-lista)	1

=== Certifications ===
Region	Certification	Certified units/sales
Denmark (IFPI Danmark)	Platinum	30,000^{^}
Norway (IFPI Norway)	20× Platinum	200,000^{*}
^{*} Sales figures based on certification alone.^{^} Shipments figures based on certification alone.

=== Pull of the Eye ===
Chart (2012)	Peak position
Norway (VG-lista)	11
