= If I Told You, You Were Beautiful =

Studio album by Minor Majority
- Released: 2002
- Genre: Rock
- Length: 33:58
- Label: Big Dipper

Minor Majority chronology
Walking Home from Nicole's (2001)	If I Told You, You Were Beautiful (2002)	Up for You & I (2004)

If I Told You, You Were Beautiful is the second album by Norwegian band Minor Majority, released in 2002.

== Track listing ==
1. "If I told you, you were beautiful"
2. "By this time tomorrow"
3. "Dancing in the backyard"
4. "She came back for her smile"
5. "Smile at everyone"
6. "Motor away"
7. "The smell of coffee"
8. "Sunburnt noon"
9. "Oh yeah"
10. "Angeline"
11. "Then you said something"
12. "Learning the game"
