= Up for You & I =

Studio album by Minor Majority
- Released: 2004
- Genre: Rock
- Length: 39:45
- Label: Big Dipper

Minor Majority chronology
If I Told You, You Were Beautiful (2002)	Up for You & I (2004)	Reasons to Hang Around (2006)

Up for You & I is the third album by Norwegian band Minor Majority, released in 2004.

It was rated an 8 out of 12 by Visions.de.

== Track listing ==
1. "Think I'm Up for You and I"
2. "Wish You Knew"
3. "She Gave Me Away"
4. "Premature Way"
5. "I Thought I Knew"
6. "Take It In"
7. "A Song for Nicole"
8. "The Dark Half"
9. "This Time"
10. "Start a Fire"
11. "Wonder If She Knows"
