= Walking Home from Nicole's =

Studio album by Minor Majority
- Released: 2001
- Genre: Rock
- Length: 28:08
- Label: Big Dipper

Minor Majority chronology
Walking Home from Nicole's (2001)	If I Told You, You Were Beautiful (2002)

Walking Home from Nicole's is Norwegian band Minor Majority's debut album released in 2001.

== Track listing ==
1. "Easy and Safe"
2. "What I Deserve"
3. "Electrolove"
4. "Singalongsong"
5. "She's a New Yorker"
6. "A Kid That Used to Look Like Me"
7. "Passion for Property"
8. "Judy's Got a Hunch"
9. "Walking Home from Nicole's"
10. "Goodbye Again"
