= Sometimes (Donkeyboy song) =

2009 single by Donkeyboy

Single by Donkeyboy

from the album Caught in a Life
- Released: 11 September 2009
- Length: 3:12
- Label: Warner Music Norway
- Songwriters: Simen Eriksrud; Cato Sundberg; Kent Sundberg

Donkeyboy singles chronology
"Ambitions" (2009)	"Sometimes" (2009)	"Broke My Eyes" (2009)

"Sometimes" is a song by Norwegian band Donkeyboy, released as the second single from their debut album, Caught in a Life. It is their second-most-successful single, after "Ambitions". "Sometimes" stayed at top of the Norwegian Singles Chart for a total of eight weeks in 2009.

== Chart performance ==
"Sometimes" debuted at number seven on Norway's VG-lista chart on the 38th chart week of 2009, which corresponds to mid-September. The following week, it rose up to number one, knocking Donkeyboy's previous single, "Ambitions", from the top spot. It kept the position for three weeks before dropping to number six on chart week 42. However, it rose back to number one after two more weeks, once again dethroning "Ambitions". It remained at number one for three more weeks before losing the top position to Rihanna's song "Russian Roulette" for a single week. Returning to number one for the third time on chart week 48, "Sometimes" stayed atop the listing for two final weeks before slipping to number four. Afterwards, it descended the Norwegian chart, dropping out of the top 20 on the ninth week of 2010 before immediately re-entering the top 20 for two additional weeks. It received a triple platinum certification from IFPI Norway in 2010 for selling over 30,000 copies.

== Charts ==
Chart (2009)	Peak position
Norway (VG-lista)	1

== Certifications ==
Region	Certification	Certified units/sales
Norway (IFPI Norway)	3× Platinum	30,000^{*}
^{*} Sales figures based on certification alone.
