= Cato Sundberg =

Norwegian musician and songwriter (born 1981)

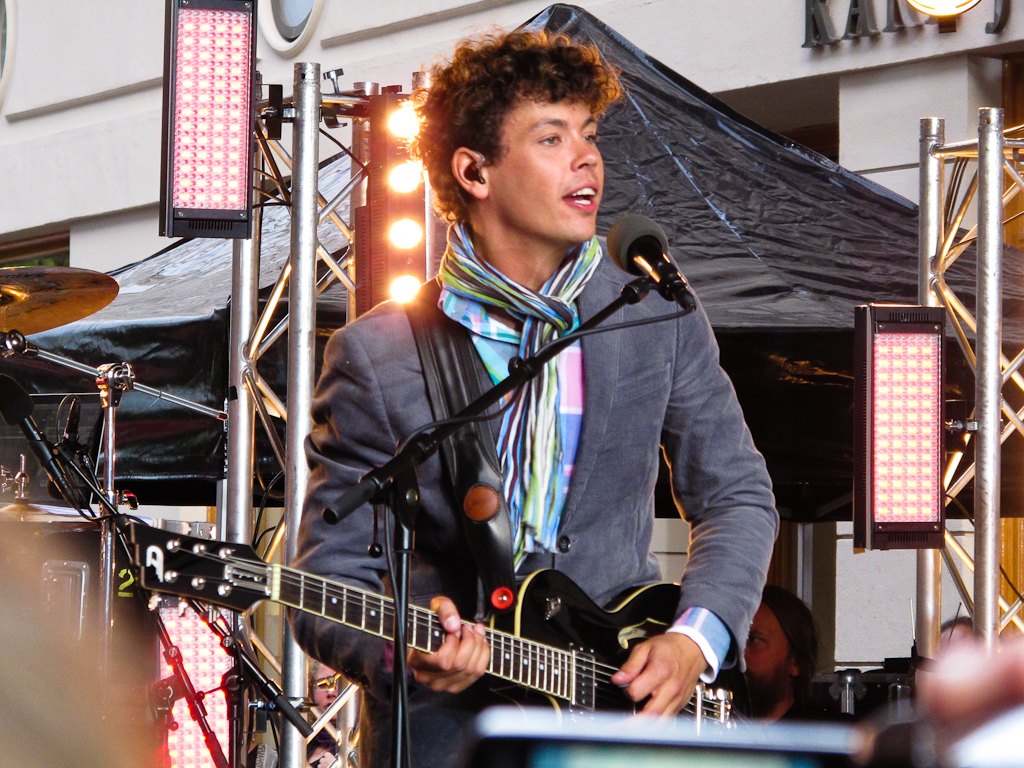
- Born: 25 March 1981 (age 45); Drammen, Norway
- Occupations: Musician, composer
- Family: Kent Sundberg

Cato Sundberg (born 25 March 1981) is a Norwegian musician (vocals and guitar) and songwriter, best known as the front man of pop group Donkeyboy. Sundberg founded the group in 2005 with, amongst others, his brother Kent. In 2009, the pair were nominated for a Spellemannprisen for their band's debut album, Caught in a Life, in the category of popular music composition. Along with Kent, they also founded and are operating a production/songwriting team and audiovisual project Rat City. That music group is very popular in Norway and in Poland.
