= Ambitions (song) =

2009 single by Donkeyboy

Single by Donkeyboy

from the album Caught in a Life
- Released: 26 March 2009
- Genre: Alternative rock, indie pop
- Length: 3:08
- Label: Warner Music Norway
- Songwriter: Cato Sundberg/Kent Sundberg/Simen M Eriksrud/Simone Larsen

Donkeyboy singles chronology
"Ambitions" (2009)	"Sometimes" (2009)

Music video
- "Ambitions" on YouTube

"Ambitions" is a song by Norwegian band Donkeyboy, taken from their debut album Caught in a Life. It was released as their debut single in 2009 and was a number-one hit in the Norwegian Singles Chart.

The chorus of the song is built around a bassline similar to those of Michael Jackson's "Billie Jean" and some of Madonna's 1980s songs, and features guest vocals by Linnea Dale. It stayed at top of the Norwegian Singles Chart for a total of 13 weeks in 2009 (weeks 27 to 38 and week 43). In February 2010, the single also topped the Swedish Singles Chart. By March 2010, it was announced that Ambitions had been on the Norwegian Singles Chart for 52 continuous weeks. Donkeyboy were due to release it in the UK on 19 April 2010, but postponed the release.

In 2010, it was recorded by sixth season The X Factor winner Joe McElderry and released in the UK on 10 October 2010 as the lead single to his debut album, Wide Awake.

== Music video ==
The music video directed by Kristoffer Borgli talks about a fictional disease "Abicere Leprous" which is caused by people giving up on their ambitions in life. Symptoms start with a vesicular skin rash, and it then spreads and destroys the entire body. The disease is almost always fatal within three years of catching it. The video interviews people infected with the disease and asks them how they were infected and what they are doing with their lives.

An alternative music video released by Donkeyboy shows various candidates in a talent competition in dancing and their tribulations and ambitions and hopes and how they are dashed. At the end of the video, Donkeyboy members invite in one of the main characters, Tobias Mead, sixth runner-up on Britain's Got Talent 2010, who just lost into their car, making his "ambitions" come true that way.

== Reception ==
"Ambitions" was released on 26 March 2009 and was put into heavy rotation by NRK P3. "Ambitions" debuted on the Norwegian singles chart at #7 on 6 April 2009, and reached the #1 spot on 29 June, after 13 weeks on the charts. "Ambitions" remained at the #1 spot for twelve consecutive weeks, before being replaced by the band's second single "Sometimes" on 22 September. This was the first time ever for a Norwegian artist to occupy the top two spots on the singles chart. Guitarist Peter Michelsen described the situation as "completely absurd".

== Charts ==
=== Weekly charts ===
Chart (2009–2010)	Peak position
Norway (VG-lista)	1
Sweden (Sverigetopplistan)	1

=== Year-end charts ===
Chart (2010)	Position
Sweden (Sverigetopplistan)	66

== Certifications ==
Region	Certification	Certified units/sales
Norway (IFPI Norway)	7× Platinum	70,000^{*}
Sweden (GLF)	Platinum	20,000^{‡}
^{*} Sales figures based on certification alone.^{‡} Sales+streaming figures based on certification alone.

== Joe McElderry version ==
"Ambitions"

Single by Joe McElderry

from the album Wide Awake
- B-side: "If You Love Me"
- Released: 8 October 2010 (Ireland); 10 October 2010 (digital download); 11 October 2010 (CD single)
- Recorded: July 2009–August 2010
- Genre: Dance-pop
- Length: 2:57
- Label: Syco Music
- Songwriter: Cato Sundberg/Kent Sundberg/Simen M Eriksrud/Simone Larsen
- Producers: Ray Hedges, Nigel Butler

Joe McElderry singles chronology
"The Climb" (2009)	"Ambitions" (2010)	"Someone Wake Me Up" (2010)

Music video
- "Ambitions" on YouTube

The song was covered by Joe McElderry, the 2009 winner in the sixth series of the UK version of The X Factor, it was his second single, the lead single and opening track from his debut album, Wide Awake (2010). It was released on digital download on 10 October 2010, with the CD single release the following day. The B-Side, "If You Love Me" is an original track which doesn't appear on the album.

=== Background ===
The record label considered changing the title of McElderry's version to "Somebody". It received its first play on BBC Radio 1 on 19 September 2010 and was uploaded on McElderry's official YouTube channel moments later. This video was made private once the official video was posted on the channel.

=== Promotion ===
The song had three television appearances. He performed the single on the Sunday 10 October show of The X Factor 2010 and on Paul O'Grady Live on 15 October 2010 as well as on The Alan Titchmarsh Show.

=== Music video ===
McElderry with backup dancers in his music video for "Ambitions"

The video was directed by Nigel Dick in Bulgaria. The filming started on 9 September 2010 and wrapped the next day. The music video leaked on 18 September 2010 but officially premiered on MSN on 23 September 2010. The video is described as an all-singing, all-dancing affair, McElderry told Daily Mirror "They wanted me to just do a few hand gestures, but I wanted a full-on dance routine. I made them get me a choreographer and everything."

The video opens with Joe getting out of a taxi and he wanders through the streets, which soon is revealed to be a video set he walks past various people including extras, dancers and a director. They soon all start dancing at the first chorus. At the second verse, he's at a fictional Rome set with an orchestra behind him. A boy walks by and drops his papers on the floor, Joe walks up to him and helps him pick them up, the boy throws the papers in the air and backup dancers appear and everyone starts dancing. After this, Joe walks into a room singing the lines "I can't tolerate". He looks in a mirror. Dancers appear behind him again as he sings the final chorus, though this time, the video cuts to the three different scenes throughout the final chorus. The dancers in the room walk away as Joe looks at the camera for the final time and turns around and walks away as the screen fades out. Joe confirmed that there will be an online music video. Fans will take part in a competition doing the dance routine from the official music video and posting it on YouTube, the best videos will be put in the music video.

=== Track listing ===
UK single

No.	Title	Writer(s)	Length
1.	"Ambitions"	Kent Sundberg, Cato Sundberg, Simen Eriksrud, Simone Larsen	2:57
2.	"If You Love Me"	Tony Nilsson, Alexander Kronlund, Fernando Fuentes	3:24

=== Reception ===
Digital Spy gave the song 4 stars, stating "Provocative, ostentatious, restless, fearless, shameless... are just a handful of adjectives we'd happily slap on the back of Lady GaGa's meat dress. Current X Factor champ Joe McElderry, on t'other hand, is just a lovely young man with a lovely face and a lovely voice. However, as his first non-Winner's Song single shows, sometimes that's enough. 'Ambitions' is actually a cover of a Scando chart-topper from little-known Norwegian band Donkeyboy, but Awur Joe, you'll be glad to know, Really Makes It... In fact, he impresses with a falsetto that has all of Mika's finesse but none of the flounce, the chorus hits the spot on first listen and the whole thing's got more bounce than a puppy with rubber booties on. A few more tunes like this, and the Geordie lad's going to make a lot of pop fans go a little bit... GaGa."

4music also praised the song saying "this is all very surprising! I fully expected Joe McElderry's new single to sound like something from the Glee soundtrack. Not that that would have been a bad thing (after all, who doesn't love a bit of Rachel Berry and co.), but the real thing is much more satisfying than that would have been. While the falsetto vocals on Ambitions immediately bring to mind Mika, there's a lot more to Ambitions than initially meets the eye. With its rich, layered vocals and uplifting chorus, Joe could potentially have a massive hit record on his hands. Well, we wouldn't want another 'Leon Jackson' situation, would we now?".

=== Charts ===
Chart (2010)	Peak position
European Hot 100 Singles	4
Ireland (IRMA)	4
Scottish Singles Sales (Official Charts)	4
Slovakia Airplay (ČNS IFPI)	79
UK Singles (Official Charts)	6

=== Year-end charts ===
Chart (2010)	Position
UK Singles (OCC)	194
