= List of governors of Khyber Pakhtunkhwa =

Below is a list of governors of Khyber Pakhtunkhwa (formerly known as the North-West Frontier Province, or NWFP). The office of the governor was first established in 1932 during the British colonial period, and has continued through the independence of Pakistan in 1947 to the present day.

== British India (1932–1947) ==
- 1932–1937: Sir Ralph Edwin Hotchkin Griffith
- 1937–1939: Sir George Cunningham
- 1939: Sir Arthur Edward Broadbent Parsons
- 1939–1946: Sir George Cunningham
- 1946–1947: Sir Olaf Kirkpatrick Caroe
- 1947: Sir Rob Lockhart (acting)

== Pakistan (1947–Present) ==
Following Pakistan's independence in 1947, the NWFP became a province of Pakistan. It was dissolved to form a unified province of West Pakistan in 1955 upon promulgation of One Unit Scheme and was reestablished in 1970. In 2010, the NWFP was renamed to Khyber Pakhtunkhwa.

No.	Name	Took office	Left office	Affiliation	Term length
1	Sir George Cunningham	15 August 1947	9 April 1948	Indian Civil Service	7 months, 25 days
2	Sir Ambrose Dundas Flux Dundas	19 April 1948	16 July 1949	Indian Civil Service	1 year, 2 months, 27 days
3	Sahibzada Mohammad Khurshid	16 July 1949	14 January 1950	Independent	5 months, 29 days
4	Mohammad Ibrahim Khan Jhagra	14 January 1950	17 February 1950	Judiciary	1 month, 3 days
5	Ismail Ibrahim Chundrigar	17 February 1950	23 November 1951	Muslim League	1 year, 9 months, 6 days
6	Khwaja Shahabuddin	24 November 1951	17 November 1954	Muslim League	2 years, 11 months, 24 days
7	Qurban Ali Shah	17 November 1954	14 October 1955	Independent	10 months, 27 days
Provinces merged to form West Pakistan (14 October 1955 – 1 July 1970)
8	Lt Gen K. M. Azhar	1 July 1970	25 December 1971	Martial Law	1 year, 5 months, 24 days
9	Hayat Sherpao	25 December 1971	30 April 1972	Pakistan Peoples Party	4 months, 5 days
10	Arbab Sikandar Khan	29 April 1972	15 February 1973	National Awami Party	9 months, 17 days
11	Aslam Khattak	15 February 1973	24 May 1974	National Awami Party	1 year, 3 months, 9 days
12	Syed Ghawas	24 May 1974	1 March 1976	Pakistan Peoples Party	1 year, 9 months, 5 days
13	Naseerullah Babar	1 March 1976	6 July 1977	Pakistan Peoples Party	1 year, 4 months, 5 days
14	Abdul Hakeem Khan	6 July 1977	17 September 1978	Civil Administration	1 year, 2 months, 11 days
15	Lt Gen Fazle Haq	11 October 1978	12 December 1985	Martial Law	7 years, 2 months, 1 day
16	Nawabzada Abdul Ghafoor Khan Hoti	30 December 1985	18 April 1986	Jamiat Ulema-e-Islam	3 months, 19 days
17	Syed Usman Ali Shah	18 April 1986	27 August 1986	Civil Administration	4 months, 9 days
18	Fida Mohammad Khan	27 August 1986	16 June 1988	Independent	1 year, 9 months, 20 days
19	Amir Gulistan Janjua	16 June 1988	19 July 1993	Independent	5 years, 1 month, 3 days
20	Khurshid Ali Khan	19 July 1993	5 November 1996	Pakistan Peoples Party	3 years, 3 months, 17 days
21	Arif Bangash	11 November 1996	17 August 1999	Independent	2 years, 9 months, 6 days
22	Miangul Aurangzeb	18 August 1999	21 October 1999	Pakistan Muslim League (N)	2 months, 3 days
23	Lt Gen Mohammad Shafiq	21 October 1999	14 August 2000	Martial Law	9 months, 24 days
24	Lt Gen Iftikhar Hussain Shah	14 August 2000	15 March 2005	Martial Law	4 years, 7 months, 1 day
25	Khalilur Rehman	15 March 2005	23 May 2006	Pakistan Muslim League (Q)	1 year, 2 months, 8 days
26	Lt Gen Ali Jan Orakzai	24 May 2006	7 January 2008	Martial Law	1 year, 7 months, 14 days
27	Owais Ahmed Ghani	7 January 2008	9 February 2011	Independent	3 years, 1 month, 2 days
28	Syed Masood Kausar	10 February 2011	10 February 2013	Pakistan Peoples Party	2 years
29	Shaukatullah Khan	10 February 2013	14 April 2014	Pakistan Peoples Party	1 year, 2 months, 4 days
30	Mehtab Ahmed Khan Abbasi	15 April 2014	8 February 2016	Pakistan Muslim League (N)	1 year, 9 months, 24 days
31	Iqbal Zafar Jhagra	25 February 2016	20 August 2018	Pakistan Muslim League (N)	2 years, 5 months, 25 days
32	Shah Farman	5 September 2018	11 April 2022	Pakistan Tehreek-e-Insaf	3 years, 7 months, 6 days
33	Haji Ghulam Ali	23 November 2022	4 May 2024	Jamiat Ulema-e-Islam (F)	1 year, 5 months, 11 days
34	Faisal Karim Kundi	4 May 2024	Incumbent	Pakistan Peoples Party	1 year, 334 days
