= Baluchistan (Chief Commissioner's Province) =

Colony of British Empire

Coordinates: 28°00′N 66°00′E

Baluchistan بلوچستان (Urdu) بلوچستان (Balochi)
- Former Province of British India and Pakistan
- 1876–1955
- Flag during British India Badge

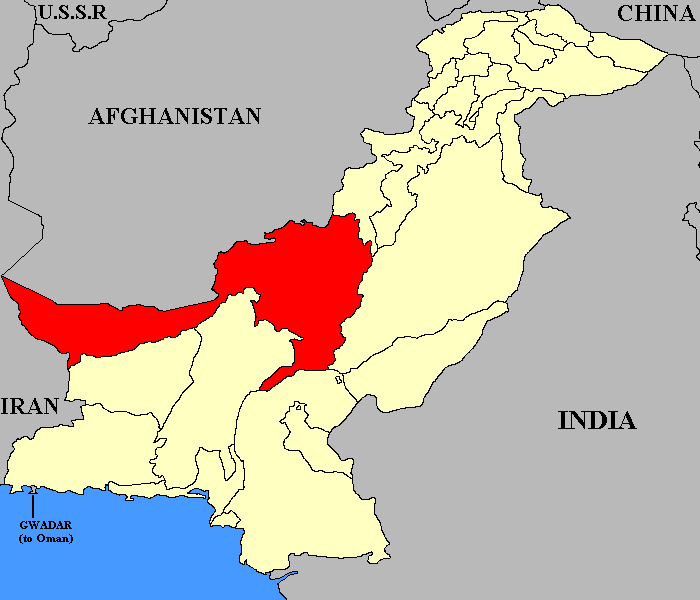
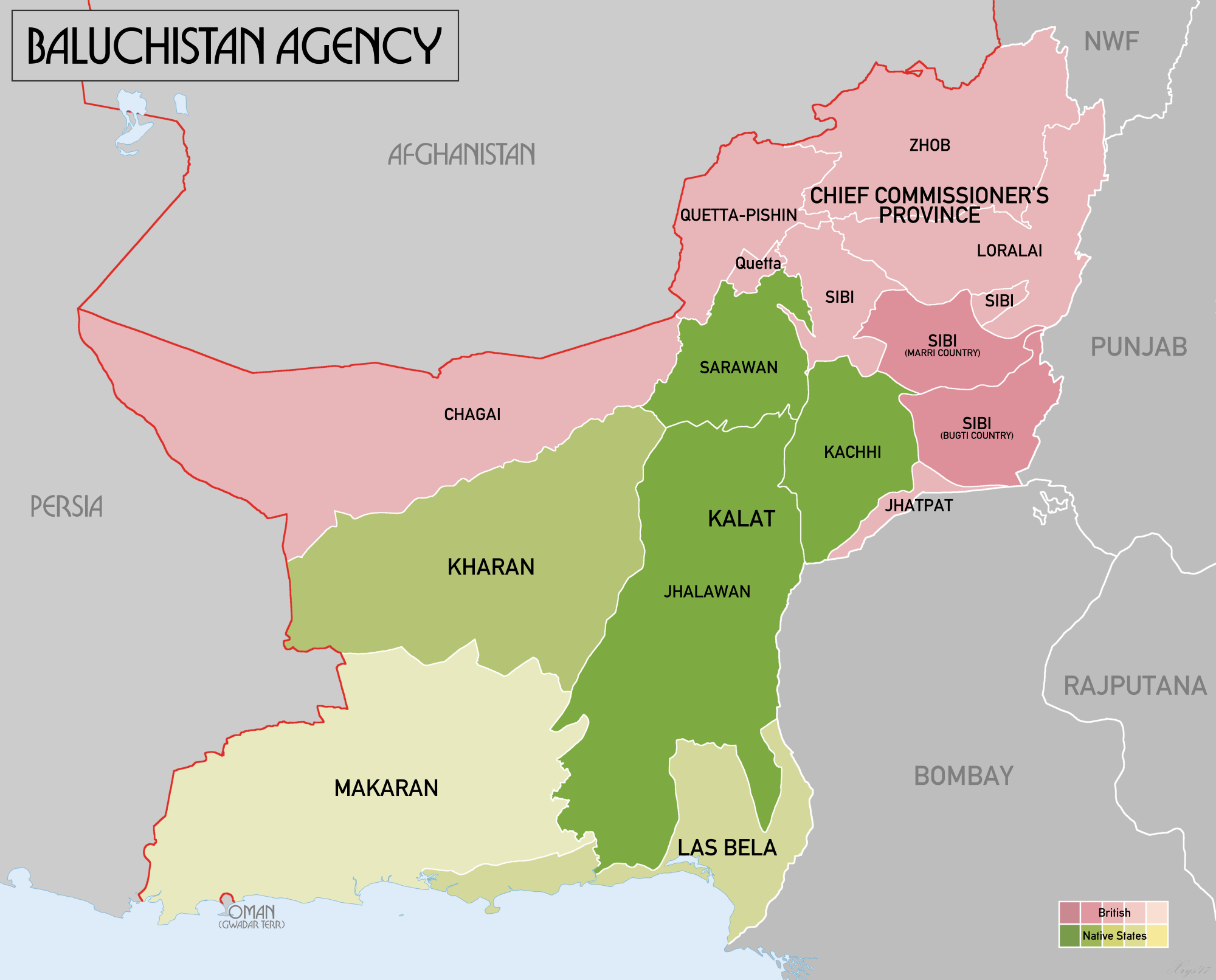
- Capital: Quetta
- Area
  - 1901: 139,396 km^{2} (53,821 sq mi)
  - 1903: 140,010 km^{2} (54,060 sq mi)
- History
  - Established: 1876
  - Quetta and surrounding districts placed under British administration: 1879
  - Administration of Pishin and Sibi tract assumed from Afghanistan: 1879
  - Bolan Pass tracts leased to British by Kalat: 1883
  - Zhob and country of Khetran tribes brought under British rule from Afghanistan: 1890
  - Chagai and West Sinjrani brought under British administration: 1896
  - Leased Nushki from Kalat: 1899
  - Leased Nasirabad from Kalat: 1903
  - Disestablished: 1955
Preceded by	Succeeded by
Baluchis; Baluchistan Agency	West Pakistan

Baluchistan was a chief commissioners province of British India established in 1876. Upon the creation of Pakistan it acceded to the newly formed state. It was part of the Baluchistan Agency. It was dissolved to form a united province of West Pakistan in 1955 upon the creation of One Unit Scheme.

== History ==
The province was originally formed over the period 1876–1891 by three treaties between Robert Sandeman and the Khan of Kalat, Khudadad of Kalat. Sandeman became the Political Agent for the British-administered areas which were strategically located between British India and Afghanistan. A military base was established at Quetta which played a major part in the Second and Third Afghan Wars.

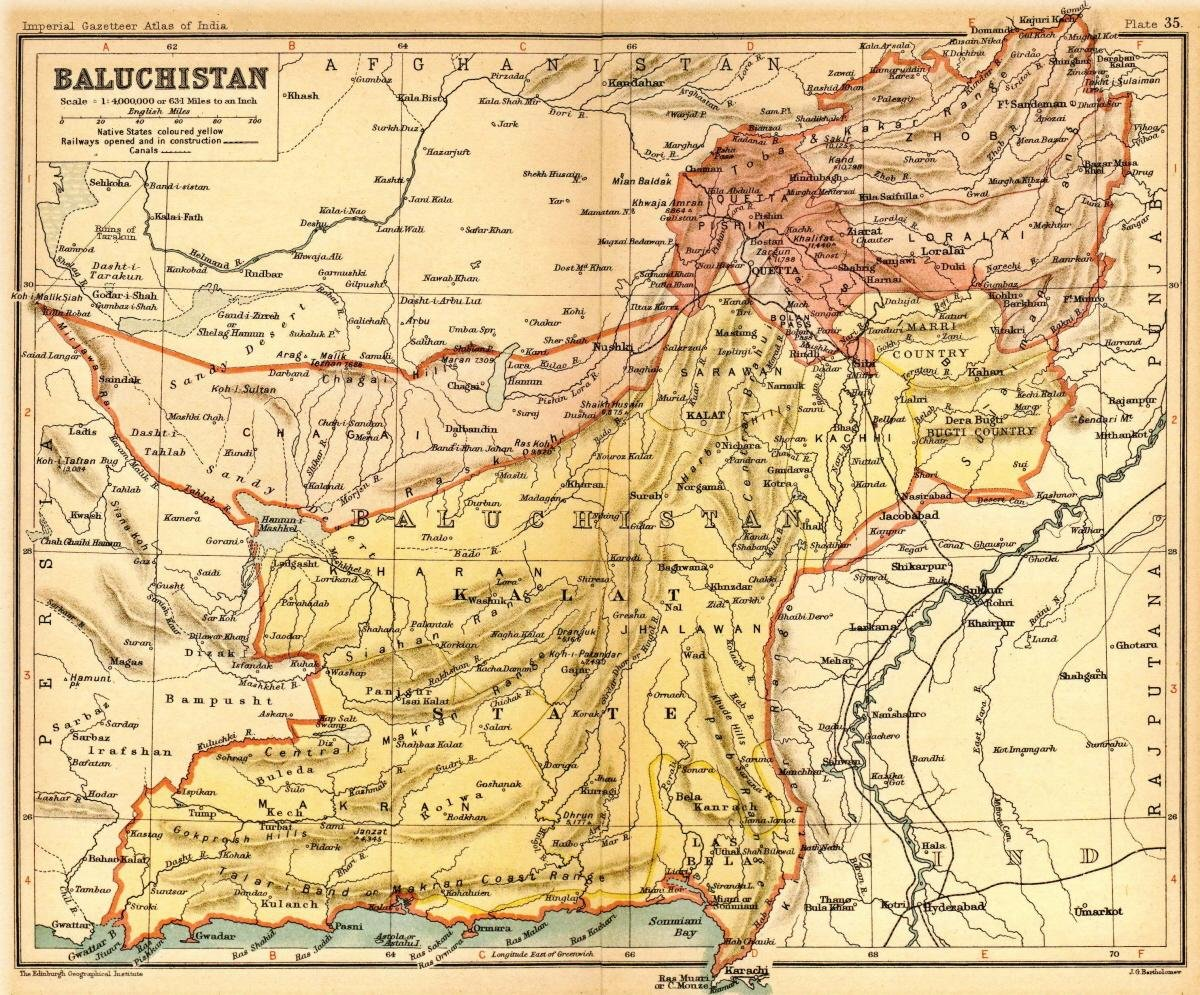
1908 map of Baluchistan, British India

Balochistan was legally ceded to Pakistan by its rulers in 1947 and continued to be administered by a Chief Commissioner. It was dissolved in 1955 when most parts of the western wing of Pakistan became the new province of West Pakistan. West Pakistan was dissolved in 1970. Khan Abdul Wali Khan intended to transfer political power to the Pashtuns. The former Chief Commissioner's province was combined with the former Balochistan States Union and the enclave of Gwadar to form a new, larger Balochistan Province, with a Governor, a Chief Minister and a Provincial Assembly.

== Demographics ==
The population of the province was equally split between Baloch tribes in the south and west and Pashtun tribes in the north.

== Government ==
The province was administered by a Chief Commissioner appointed by the Federal Government. Although there was no elected legislature the Chief Commissioner could consult the Shahi Jirga, an assembly of tribal leaders.

The province comprised three groups of areas – the settled districts, the political agencies and the tribal area. The settled areas were mainly the district around Quetta and Jaffarabad. The agencies were the Zhob agency to the north of Quetta and the Chagai agency to the west, which had a tenuous land link with the rest of the province. The tribal areas were the Bugti and Marri tribal agencies which would later become Provincially Administered Tribal Areas in the new Balochistan province.

Tenure	Chief Commissioner of Balochistan
15 August 1947 – 3 October 1947	Sir Geoffrey Prior
3 October 1947 – 8 April 1948	Sir Ambrose Dundas Flux Dundas
9 April 1948 – 18 January 1949	Cecil Arthur Grant Savidge
19 January 1949 – 16 July 1949	Sahibzada Mohammad Khurshid
16 July 1949 – 18 November 1952	Mian Aminuddin
18 November 1952 – 13 February 1953	Unknown
13 February 1953 – 8 November 1954	Qurban Ali Khan
8 November 1954 – 19 July 1955	Sardar Bahadur Khan
19 July 1955 – 25 July 1955	R.A.F. Hyride
26 July 1955 – 14 October 1955	R.A.M. Shaker
14 October 1955	Province abolished

see List of Chief Commissioners of Baluchistan

== See also ==
- Balochistan province
- Balochistan States Union
- Quetta Residency
- Makran
- Las Bela
- Kharan
- Khanate of Kalat
- Politics of Pakistan
- History of Pakistan
- Robert Groves Sandeman
