= Land Port Authority =

Land Port Authority may refers to;

- Bangladesh Land Port Authority
- Land Ports Authority of India
- Pakistan Land Port Authority
