= Hassan Azhar Hayat Khan =

Pakistani army officer and retired Lieutenant General

Sardar Hassan Azhar Hayat Khan

MD Land Port Authority
- Incumbent
- Assumed office 16 December 2025

Commander XI Corps Peshawar
- In office August 2022 – May 2024
- Preceded by: Faiz Hameed
- Succeeded by: Omer Ahmed Bokhari

Personal details
- Born: Wah, Pakistan
- Education: Pakistan Military Academy; Command and Staff College Quetta
- Awards: Hilal-i-Imtiaz (Military)

Military service
- Allegiance: Pakistan
- Branch/service: Pakistan Army
- Years of service: 1988 — 2024
- Rank: Lieutenant General
- Unit: Guides Infantry
- Commands: Military Secretary, GHQ; General Officer Commanding, 7th Infantry Division; Commander XI Corps

Sardar Hassan Azhar Hayat Khan is a retired general of the Pakistan Army who served as commander of the XI Corps, Peshawar.

After his retirement, Khan has been serving as Managing Director (MD) of Pakistan's Land Port Authority since 16 December 2025.

== Military career ==
Khan was commissioned in the Guides Infantry through 78 PMA Long Course in 1988.

As a major general, he served as Military Secretary at GHQ. He also held the office General Officer Commanding of the 7th Infantry Division, assigned at Miranshah.

He was promoted to the rank of Lieutenant General and appointed as Commander of the XI Corps, located at Peshawar in August 2022, replacing Faiz Hameed. He held the post until his retirement in May 2024. He is considered as a dedicated soldier, who emphasized his work the people of Khyber Pakhtunkhwa.

== Post-retirement ==
After retiring from the military, he reportedly became associated with private initiatives, including promoting tourism in Pakistan.

Since 16 December 2025, Lt.General (Retd) Khan has been serving as the Managing Director (MD) of the Pakistan's Land Port Authority after approval by the Prime Minister Shehbaz Sharif.

== Family ==
Hassan Azhar Hayat Khan belong to a family belonging to the Khattar Tribe in Wah, Pakistan. Hassan's elder brother Ahsan Azhar Hayat Khan also retired from Pakistan Army as a three-star Lieutenant General.

== Awards and recognition ==
- Hilal-i-Imtiaz (Military) – Awarded in recognition of his service in the Pakistan Army.
