= Mulla Effendi =

Islamic scholar

Personal details
- Born: 1863 Erbil, Baghdad Eyalet, Ottoman Iraq
- Died: December 31, 1942 (aged 79) Erbil, Kingdom of Iraq

Mulla Abu Bakr Effendi, also Mulla Effendi (also spelled Mala Fandi, (Kurdish: Mele Fendî), (Arabic: ملا أفندي), Abu Bakr IV, or Küçük Mulla (Turkish: Küçük Mulla Efendi; 1863 - December 31, 1942), was a senior Islamic philosopher, scholar, astronomer, politician, and a prominent personality from Erbil, Ottoman Iraq (now in Kurdistan Region of Iraq).

Mulla Effendi was born into a respected and intellectual family of Islamic scholars who settled in Erbil in the 16th century. He spent most of their life learning and teaching Islamic studies at the Great Mosque at the Citadel of Erbil. His family was well known for their piety and learning and influential throughout Kurdistan for a hundred years before him.

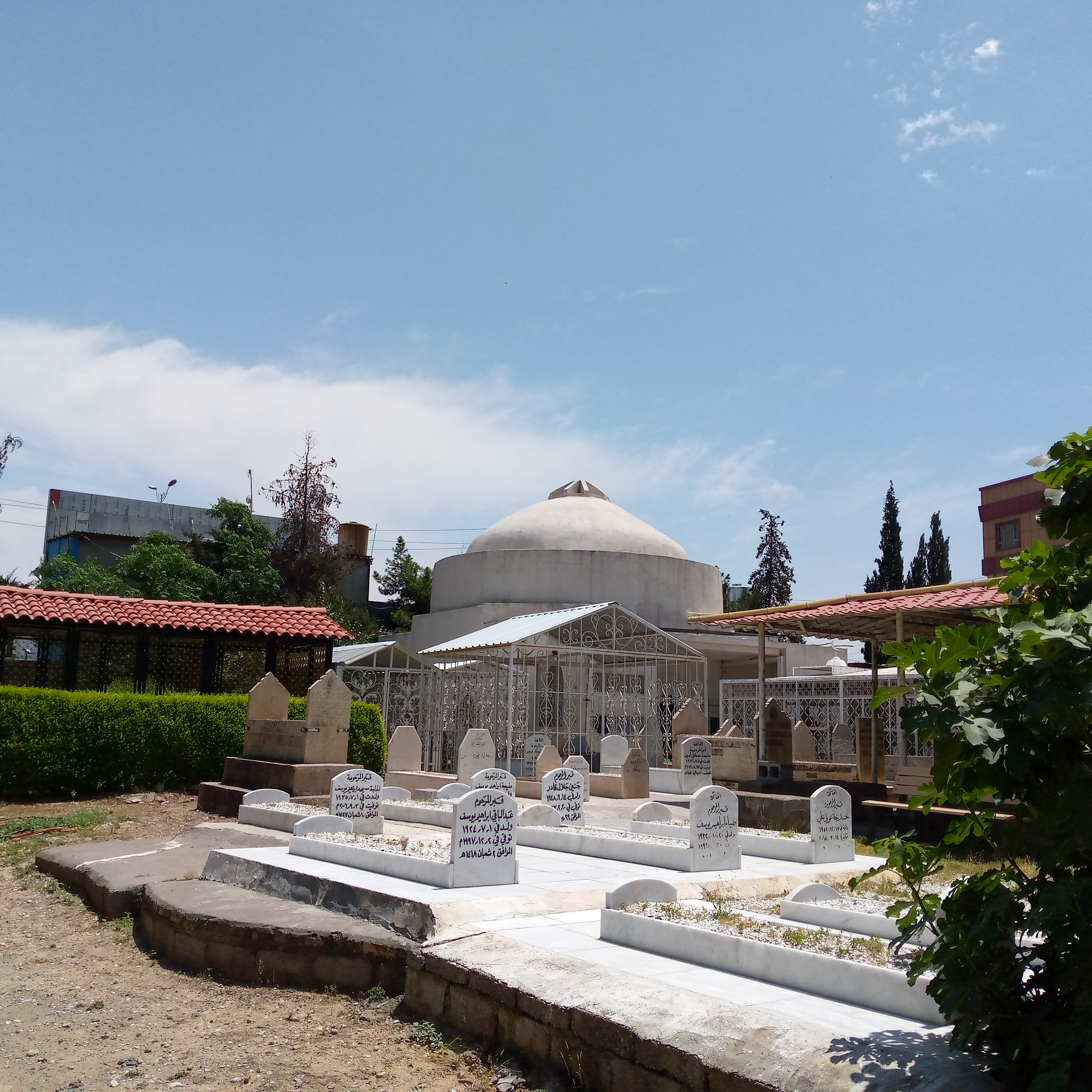
Mulla Effendi Shrine in Badawa

After being educated at the Great Mosque, Mulla Effendi like his ancestors spent most of his time teaching and learning there. Throughout his life, he granted more than hundred scientific licenses for scholars from different parts of Iraq, Iran, and the Middle East in general, and sponsored the daily living and study costs of his students. He also contributed to establishing many schools and mosques in Arbil and in many different villages.

He became one of the most influential figures in Kurdistan in the late 19th century and until his death. He had an important role in disengaging tribal conflicts during the Ottoman rule where he received the highest recognition by the Ottoman Sultan Abdul Hamid II. Throughout the British Mandate and after the creation of Iraq, he played a prominent role in inspiring and directing public opinion, as well as being deeply involved in the political process of the region. In 1924, he strongly urged appending Mosul Wilayah to Iraq in his meeting with the members of the League of Nations commission. He also advocated for the rights of the Christian inhabitants of Ankawa. In the events of 1941, the Iraqi royal family chose his house as the most suitable and safe for their stay, and when King Faisal II returned, he awarded him "Wisam al-Rafidain" of the first order as a reward for his services for his country. He also received many honors and tributes both during and after his life.

== Early life and family ==
Mulla Abu Bakr Effendi's family is traced back to a known family that emigrated from Iran along with other families during the 16th century at the time of Shah Ismail I Safawi of Iran and settled in Arbil. The reason for the emigration was due to differences between the chief leader of the family and the ruling Shah.

For several generations before him, his ancestors were famous scholars teaching Islamic studies at the Great Mosque at the Citadel of Arbil. They were widely known and respected throughout Kurdistan for their piety and knowledge. He was named "Küçük Mulla" or "Malla i Gichka" (that means "Little Mulla") after his grandfather Abu Bakr III Effendi (1778–1855) who was known by that name because he completed his study of Islamic sciences in a record period as no one had done before in that age.

Mulla Effendi received his education from his father, Hajji Omer Effendi, who was the speaker of the Great Mosque. Mulla Effendi's passion for study and learning led him to start teaching and writing when he was young. He was only twenty eight years when he took his father's place after his father's death in 1891.

In 1908, Mulla Effendi renovated the Great Mosque. He taught Islamic philosophy, Islamic history, science, mathematics, astronomy and ethics. Only he could issue Fatwas in Arbil and for nearby tribes and villages where he granted more than hundred scientific licenses for scholars from different parts of Iraq, Iran, and the Middle East in general.

Mulla Effendi's whole family were consumptive, and he lost two wives and three daughters through this complaint. He was married four times during his life, and left two sons and three daughters. In 1913, he moved from his house at the citadel to his new house in Badawa (3 km southeast of the citadel, at (36°10′14.04″N 44°02′12.13″E), after its completion.

== Works ==
=== Ottoman Empire ===
During the Ottoman Empire, Mulla Effendi's family had a significant role in disengaging public conflicts and settling disputes between Kurdish tribes. At one time, Sultan Abdul Hamid II requested Mulla Effendi's help to settle a conflict between two large Kurdish tribes. Mulla Effendi used his influence to reconcile the two tribes.

For his achievement, Sultan Abdul Hamid II granted him the "Servant of the Two Shrines" medal. It was considered the second highest rank Order of the Ottoman Empire.

=== British mandate ===
During the beginning of the British mandate, following the arrival of the British troops into Iraq, the country was in a state of anarchy. Mulla Effendi gathered the tribal leaders and urged them to refrain from taking any action that would compromise the stability of the country. Lieut.-Colonel Sir Rupert Hay, the British Political Officer of Arbil, and author of "Two Years in Kurdistan, Experiences of a Political Officer 1918-1920", described Mulla Effendi's role in inspiring and directing the public opinion, and in talking to the tribal chiefs over to a reasonable attitude. He described Mulla Effendi in his book as the following:

... Of these Mulla Effendi is far and away the most important; I often used to visit him at his house at Badawa, the scene of the negotiations with the Dizai chiefs. It is a lovely place shut in by orchards and vineyards with, on the east side, a small water-tank surrounded by flower-beds thick with whatever blooms happen to be in season. Close by roses and jasmine perfume the air. The building is of two storeys, in each of which there is a large open room facing north; that below contains a fountain while the upper one is separated from the open air by a finely carved screen of walnut wood. There are various inner rooms, beautifully carpeted, some of them containing fine inlaid furniture. The whole style of the building is highly ornate, the ceiling being painted in a mosaic. Mulla Effendi spends his days in the Great Mosque of Arbil, and betakes himself to this retreat in the evening. His real name is Abubekr, but he is always known as Mulla Effendi or Mulla i Gichka, the Little Mulla. Short stature he possessed refined and aquiline features, and the tranquil look of a really pious man; I have never seen such a pair of delicate hands as his. He wears normally a long grey gown stretching to his feet, and a fez wound round with pale blue muslin. He is respected throughout Kurdistan for his piety and learning; his ancestors for several generations before him have earned a similar reputation, and it is said that none of the family, which owns large properties, have ever yet laid a complaint against any man. Mulla Effendi is trustee for the endowments of the Great Mosque; he normally leads the services there and preaches the Friday sermon. Unlike most of his class he is decidedly progressive, reading modern periodicals from Egypt and Turkey, and talking with intelligence on political and scientific subjects. I asked him one day his attitude with regard to the situation in Mesopotamia, and he replied, "Everyone wishes to see his mother country independent. At present, however, we are split by mutual jealousies, and there is nobody fit to govern. We want you to look after us until security is restored, and we are capable of governing ourselves." He remained true to this policy throughout, and though, as became one of his cloth, he refused any official position, he always supported the Government with his influence to this utmost of his power, and it was he more than anybody else who led public opinion in Arbil. Ahmad Effendi, his cousin and my faithful adherent, acted very largely on his advice.

Also, in his book, he wrote:

... Yet I have rarely met a more modest man; he would not listen to my expressions of gratitude, and merely stated that he strove and always had striven for the good of his country and his people.

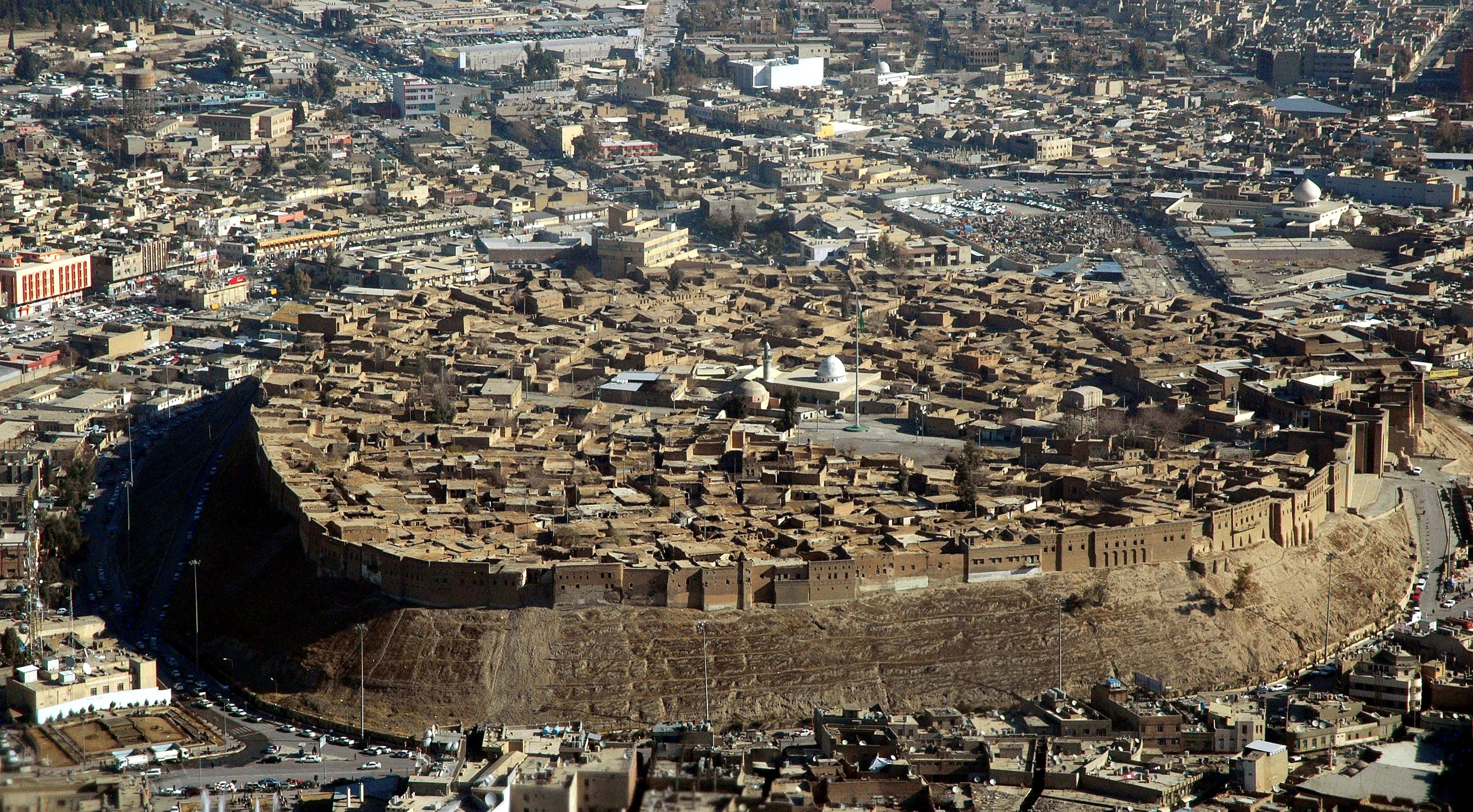
An aerial view of Citadel of Arbil in January 2008 shows the Great Mosque at the center. The Great Mosque is considered to be the oldest mosque in Arbil. It is also known as the White Mosque, Citadel Mosque, or Mulla Effendi Mosque.

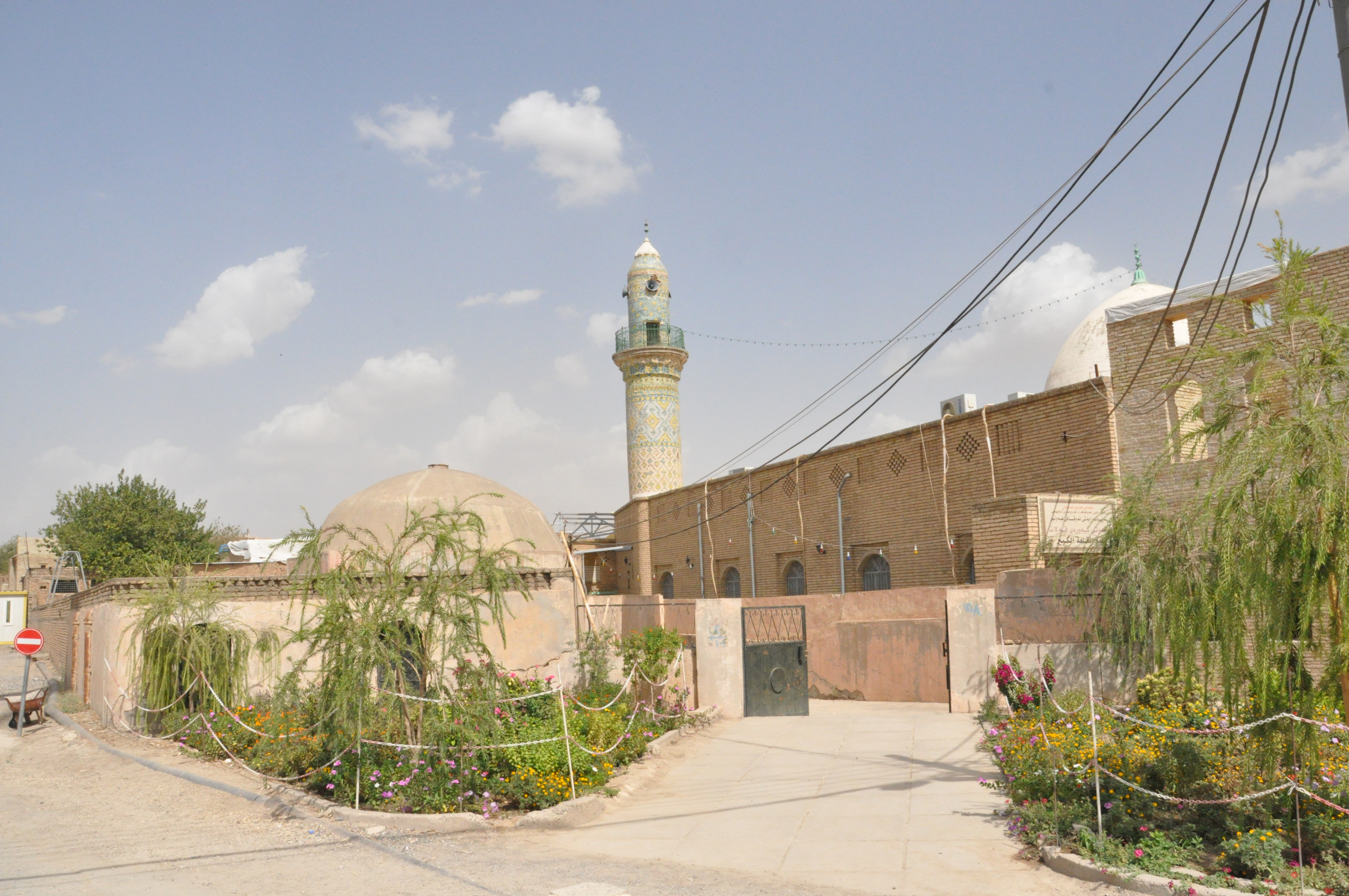
The Great Mosque (or Mulla Effendi Mosque) at the heart of Erbil Citadel

Gertrude Bell had often visited Mulla Effendi at his house in Badawa, and mentioned him in her letters to her father published in 1927, a year after her death by her stepmother in two volumes.

A.M. Hamilton, who was notable for building the Hamilton Road through Kurdistan, described him in his book published in 1937 "Road through Kurdistan". Also, Lieut.-Colonel Sir Wallace A. Lyon, the predecessor of Lieut.-Colonel Sir William Rupert Hay, described Mulla Effendi's status in his autobiography (1918–44):

The most influential notable in Arbil province was Abubeker, a rich and holy Moslem cleric who was always referred to as Mulla Effendi. He followed both world and local politics with great interest, and his wide knowledge of most subjects from astronomy to botany was extraordinary as he had never travelled outside the province. After his first few wives had died of tuberculosis he had sense enough to leave the Qala and build himself a villa on a stream about a mile south of the town. He set up his own chapel, his library of Persian, Turkish and Arabic books, his garden and guest house, and seldom left it except for the Friday Prayer in the big mosque in the Qala. Whenever I returned from leave, a long absence in the mountains from a frontier affray, or escaped an ambush, he would call on me in the office and invite me to a banquet at his villa. He was a most charming conversationalist and a lavish host. The lunch was usually a fourteen-course affair, composed of nearly all the principal Turkish, Persian and Arab dishes, to which we did full justice. There were times when he would call on me to warn me that in the near future he would have to lead a deputation pleading for mercy for some notorious criminal. Would I receive the deputation politely and agree to consider the case, but on no account was I to allow this to influence my ultimate decision, because in fact the criminal in question was a notorious blackguard who well merited whatever was coming to him. I was to understand that as a leader of the notables he had to do his duty etc., etc. He had great influence with the tribal chiefs who were always going to him for advice, and a line from him would be sure of a favourable reception from an otherwise bigoted and unco-operative public. He could reassure them about drinking water from a clean source pumped by infidel engines to the top of the Qala, and when the first troop of Boy Scouts was looked up with suspicious as the beginning of conscription, it was Mulla Effendi who told his sons to Join. The rest followed like sheep.

In 1924 at the time when the dispute between Iraq and Turkey over the control of the former Ottoman province of Mosul was under discussion by the League of Nations, the members of the League of Nations Commission visited Mulla Effendi at his house in Badawa to discuss the issue with him. At the meeting, he strongly supported annexing Mosul to Iraq and stressed the rights of the Kurdish population.

In December 1924 and June 1931, King Faisal I visited Mulla Effendi in his house in Badawa in Arbil and thanked him for his efforts and his calls for reconciliation and peace to the different groups in the region. King Faisal I was quoted as describing Mulla Effendi to his brother by saying:

I think you have never seen Mulla Effendi, I wish you had seen him. There is no one like him in the North, not even in Iraq, not even in horizons.

=== Ankawa Christians ===
In the early 1920s, a few groups threatened to take over the lands of the indigenous Christian inhabitants of Ankawa. The Archbishop and town chiefs went to meet Mulla Effendi at the Great Mosque to explain the situation to him and make him aware of rising tensions in Ankawa. Mulla Effendi immediately gathered the tribal leaders in Arbil and informed tribesmen that he would consider any attack against Christians as an attack against him. With those words, he prevented any further attempts of taking over Christian lands in Ankawa.

=== 1941 Coup d'etat ===
During the last days of the Anglo-Iraqi War, before British troops entered Baghdad, and before the collapse of Rashid Ali Al-Gaylani government, Rashid Ali phoned Mulla Effendi and informed him that he had chosen his house as a safe haven for the royal family to stay until the conflict ended. King Faisal II, Queen Alia, members of the royal family, and court escorts and servants left Baghdad on May 28, 1941, to stay at Mulla Effendi's house at Badawa. He opened his house to them and moved his family to another house at the citadel. He invited tribal leaders to Badawa to express solidarity with the royal family. On June 3, 1941, two days after the return of Regent Abd al-Ilah from Habbaniyah to Baghdad, the royal family left Badawa and returned to Baghdad.

On his return to Baghdad, King Faisal II decorated Mulla Effendi with Wisam al-Rafidain "the Medal of the Two Rivers" in recognition of his work for the country.

== Death and legacy ==
Abu Bakr Mulla Effendi died on Thursday December 31, 1942. He was buried in the family's private cemetery in Badawa. His death was a sad loss to many. Highest-ranking members of the government and others such as Deputy Chief of Royal Protocol on behalf of Regent Abd al-Ilah, the Iraqi Premier then Nuri as-Said, the British Ambassador to Iraq in Baghdad Sir Kinahan Cornwallis, the President of the Senate Sayyid Muhammad al-Sadr, Mutasarrif of Mosul Abdul-Majeed al-Yaqubi, Jamil al-Midfai (served five times as Prime Minister of Iraq), Dawud al-Haidary (well-known Iraqi statesman), paid tribute to his family.

Well-known scholars who studied from Mulla Effendi included: Sheikh Mustafa al-Naqishbandi, Mulla Taaeb Ahmed Mohammad Jaff, Mulla Sharif Ahmed Mohammad Jaff, Wahbatallah Effendi, Mulla Abdullah Mariwani, Sayyid Abdullah Effendi Mukiryani, Abdulfattah Effendi Shwani, Sheikh Muhammad al-Khal, al-Haj Mulla Muhammad al-Sudani, Sheikh Arif Ashnawi, Muhammad Tajaddin al-Talshi, Mulla Muhammad al-Sawij Bolaqi, Mulla Muhammad al-Saqzi, Mulla Abdullah al-Burhani, al-Mulla Abdullfattah al-Khati, al-Haj Mulla Salih Koza Banka, and other well-known scholars.

His scientific and religious works are well-known and available in the schools of Arbil. He contributed to establishing many schools and mosques in Arbil and in many villages. He also sponsored the costs of living and studying of his students at the Great Mosque. Each year, he had the right to send two students to al-Azhar in Cairo to pursue their studies. He maintained strong relationships with senior scholars from Egypt, Turkey, Afghanistan, and other places.

=== Library ===
He had two large libraries. One of them was at the Great Mosque, and the other was at Badawa. The libraries were full of references, valuable and rare manuscripts and printed materials. The libraries contained books on language, science, grammar, morphology, rhetoric, Tafsir (Commentary on the Quran), Hadith (Traditions of the Prophet), linguistics, doctrine, logic, literature.

In the mid-1960s, a fire destroyed the library at Badawa and a lot of the books in that library were lost. The books that were at the citadel library of and some at the Badawa library are preserved to this day, while the majority of manuscripts are at Dar al-Makhtutat al-Iraqiyya / the Iraqi House of Manuscripts (formerly Dar Saddam lil-Makhtutat / Saddam House of Manuscripts).

== Books ==
- Tafsir "Quran Explanation" (manuscript).
- The Astrolabe (manuscript).
- Algebra "Old Verbal Method" (manuscript).
- Commentaries on "the Attitudes of Public Situations" in explanation of al-Jarjani book.
- Commentaries on (Orbits Law).
- Commentaries on (Astrolabe) book.
- Translated from Turkish "al-Badeea" book, on using the Astrolabe.
- Translations from Turkish and Persian into Kurdish and Arabic.
- Poems in Kurdish, Arabic, Turkish, and Persian.

Piramerd's "On the death of Mulla Effendi"

== Honors and tributes ==
Mulla Effendi received many honors and tributes during his life and posthumously. Many places have been named after him.

- "Servant of the Two Holy Shrines" medal of the first order of the Ottoman Empire was granted to Mulla Effendi by Sultan Abdul Hamid II.
- Wisam al-Rafidain (the Medal of the Two Rivers) of the first order was granted by King Faisal II of Iraq.
- In 1943, the famous Kurdish poet Piramerd wrote a poem following his death titled "On the death of Mulla Effendi".
- Many famous poets praised Mulla Effendi in their poems, including Sheikh Raza Talabani, Nemat-Allah al-Nema, and Abdul-Rahman al-Bana.
- The Kurdistan Regional Government named a street, a school, and a public health center in Arbil city after him.

== See also ==
- List of Kurdish philosophers
