= Ahmed Uthman =

Kurdish politician

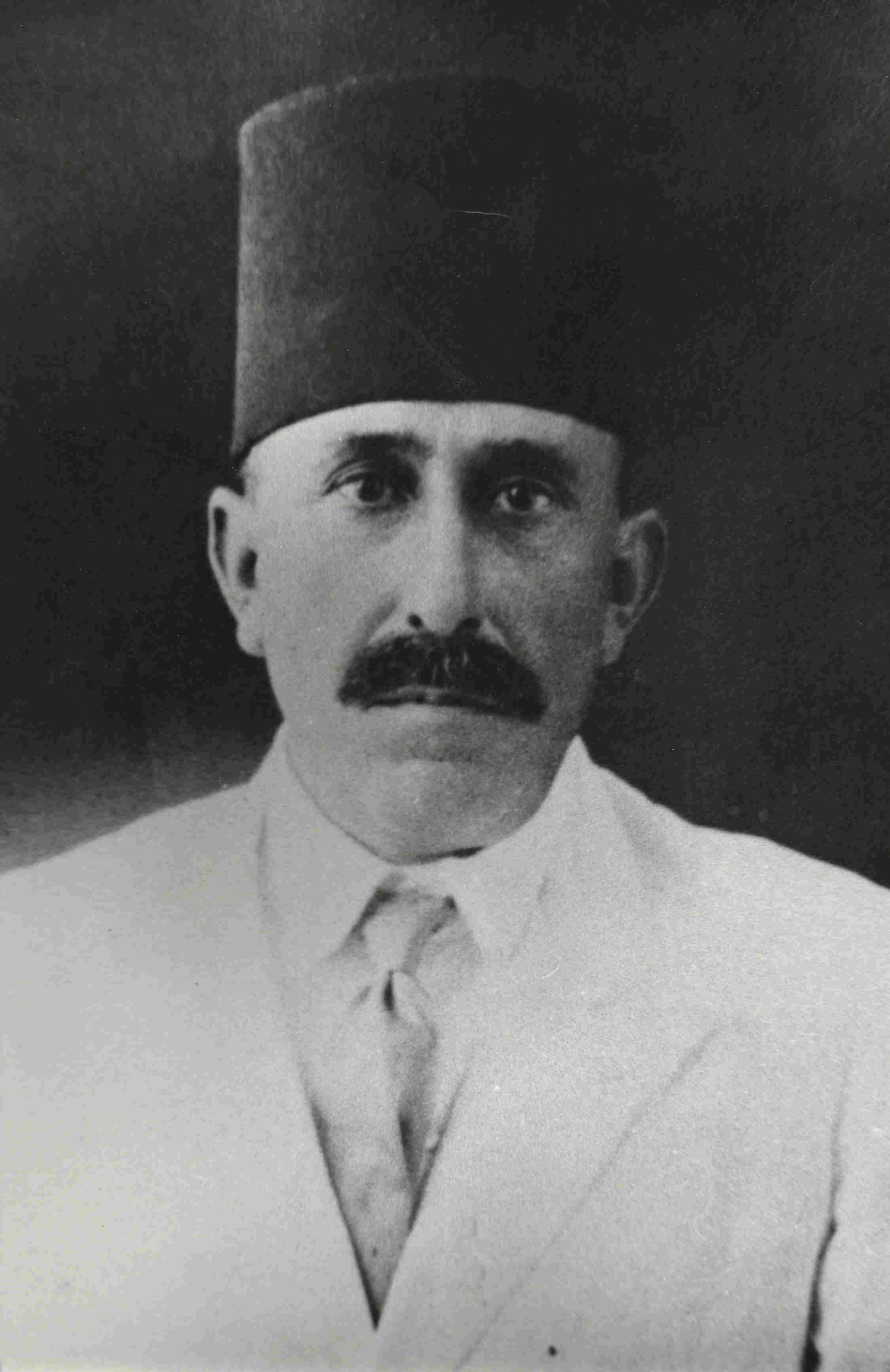

Personal details
- Born: 1879 Mosul, Mosul Vilayet, Ottoman Empire (present day Iraq)
- Died: December 10, 1946 (aged 66–67) Erbil, Iraq

Ahmed Uthman Effendi (also spelled Ahmed Othman) (1879 – December 10, 1946) also known as Ahmed Effendi, (Kurdish: ئه‌حمه‌د عوسمان ئه‌فه‌ندى) (Arabic: أحمد عثمان أفندي) was a Kurdish politician from Erbil who played an important role in shaping events and the direction of public administration in Iraqi Kurdistan in the first half of the twentieth century.

He was the first Mutasarrif (governor) of Erbil in the first Iraqi government (1921–1927), the Mutasarrif of Sulaymaniyah (1927–1929), member of the Iraqi House of Notables or Senate "Majlis al-Ayan" (1929–1937), and Member of the House of Deputies "Majlis al-Nuwaab" representing Erbil (1937–1946).

== Family ==
Ahmed Uthman's family is traced back to an intellectual and respected family of Islamic scholars who emigrated Iran along with other families during the 16th century to settle in Erbil at the time of Shah Ismail I Safawi of Iran. The reason of the emigration was of differences between the chief leader of the family and the Shah then.

His family was widely known and influential throughout Kurdistan for their piety and leaning. They were teaching Islamic studies at the Great Mosque at the Citadel of Erbil for several generations before him. His grandfather, Abu Bakr III Effendi, was an influential religious leader who was always referred to as Küçük Mulla, or Malla i Gichka (Little Mulla), because he completed his study of Islamic sciences in a record period as no one had done before in that age. Ahmed Uthman was a cousin of Mulla Effendi, a famous Kurdish personality.

== Life ==
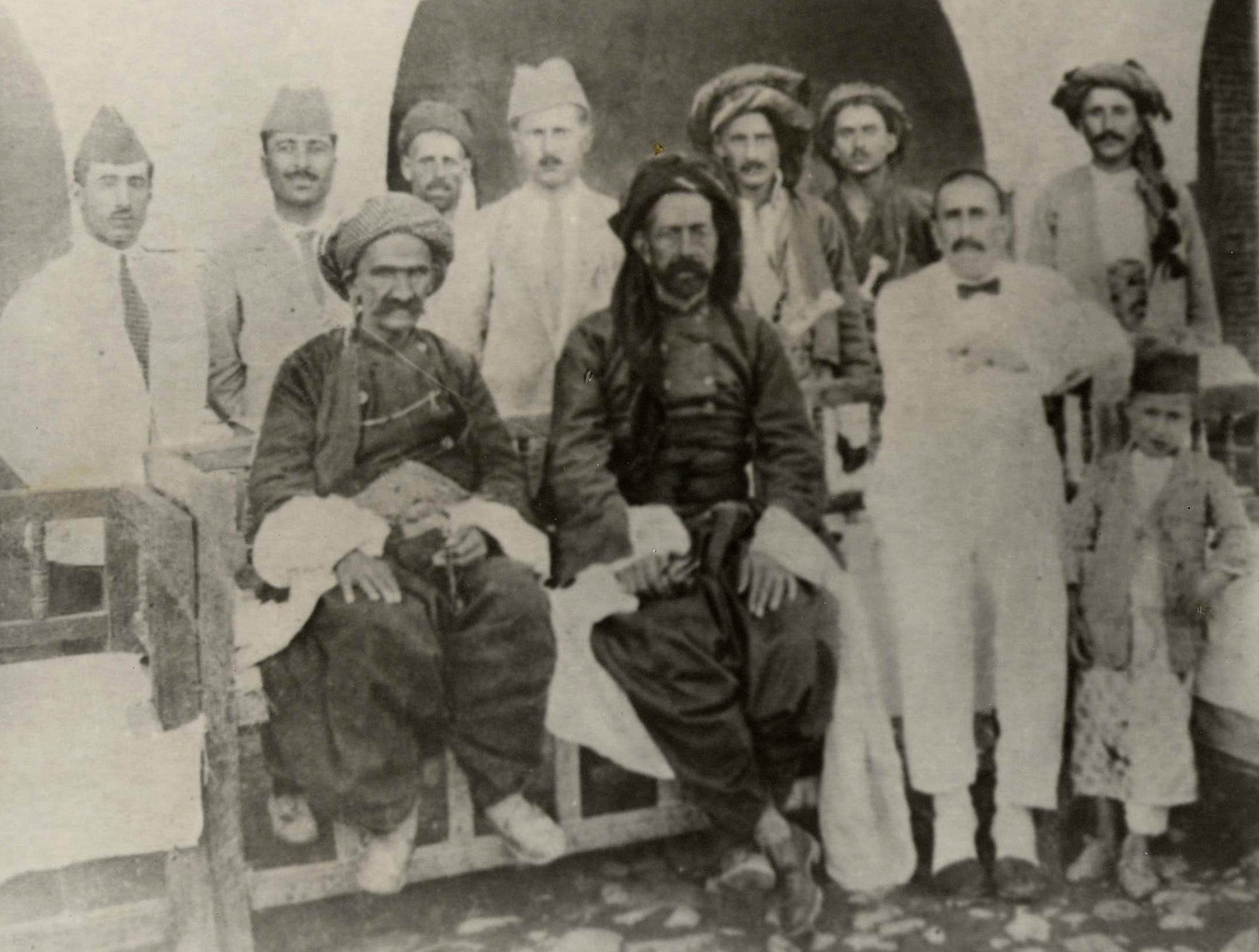
Ahmed Uthman with Sheik Mahmud Barzanji in Sulaymaniyah in 1927 as he was serving as Mutasarrif of Sulaymaniyah. Sitting from right: Ahmed Uthman and his son Zaid Othman, Sheik Mahmud Barzanji, Sheik Hama Gharib. Ahmed Uthman maintained strong relationship with Sheik Mahmud as can be seen in the letters that they exchanged.

Ahmed Uthman was born in Mosul in 1879 where his father was serving as a Judge. In 1906, he was appointed a judge in Erbil, and later in 1911 was appointed judge in Mosul. During the last years of the Ottoman Empire in 1917 he became the Mayor of Erbil.

In 1923, after the formation of the first Iraqi government, Ahmed Uthman was appointed Mutasarrif of Erbil until 1927 where he became the Mutasarrif of Sulaymaniyah. In 1929 he moved to Baghdad where he was appointed a member of the Iraqi House of Notables in Baghdad, and remained a Senator until 1937, when he was elected member of the House of Deputies representing Erbil. He remained Member of the Parliament for three consecutive parliamentary periods until his death on December 10, 1946.

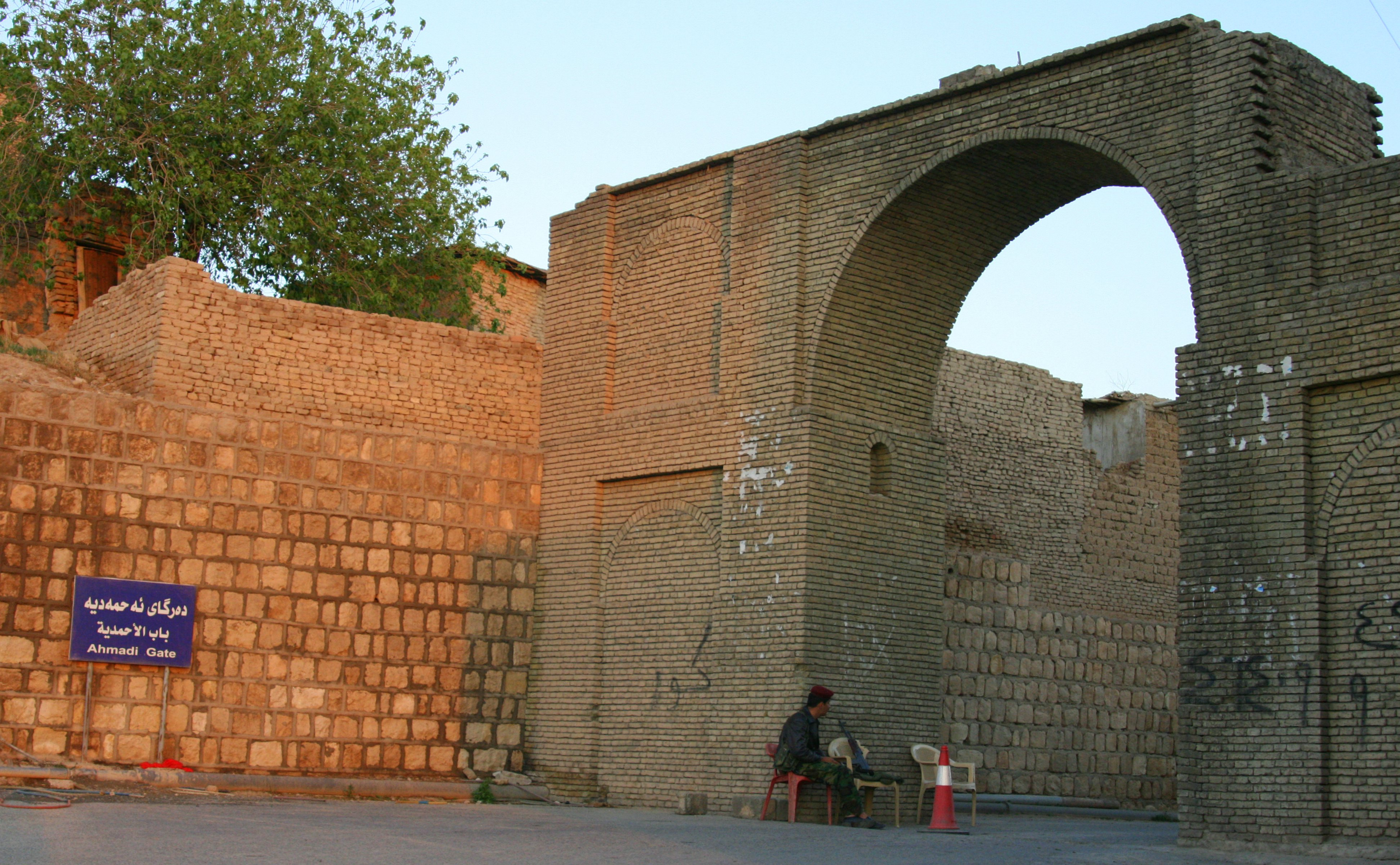
Ahmadi Gate was named after Ahmed Uthman, is one of the two main gates of the Citadel of Erbil. The gate was built when Ahmed Uthman was the Mutasarrif of Erbil.

The famous Iraqi historian and sociologist Dr. Ali al-Wardi in his six volumes "the Social Glimpses of the History of Modern Iraq" describes Ahmed Uthman's wisdom and ability in saving the city of Erbil when it was surrounded and threatened by rebellious tribesmen, in meeting with the tribesmen outside the gates of the city all on his own, negotiating with their leaders, meeting some of their demands, and persuading them to leave, at the time that there was no military protection in the city.

Ahmed Uthman in a group photo with his fellow Iraqi Senators in 1933. Sitting from right: al-Haj Muhammad al-Istirbadi, Alwan al-Yasiri, al-Haj Hassan al-Shaboot, Muhammad al-Sadr, Muhammad Ali Bahr al-Ulloom, Noor al-Yassiri, Aday al-Jaryan. Standing from right: Azra Menachem Daniel, Abdullah al-Safi, Fakhri Al Jamil Qasim Agha, Yassin al-Khidhri, Ahmed Uthman Effendi, Maulood Mukhlis, Taha al-Rawi.

=== Relations with United Kingdom ===
Ahmed Uthman maintained good relations with the British administration in Iraq throughout the British Mandate.

Gertrude Bell's letter to her father on 19 November 1922 describing Ahmed Uthman:

I spent next morning talking to the Mutasarrif, Ahmad Effendi, who had some of the notables in to see me. Ahmad Effendi is one of the outstanding people of the country...he has worked loyally with us from the first and if the Turks came back he would have to leave the country. He is a well educated and exceptionally intelligent man with whom you talk as to one of ourselves. He has the division in the hollow of his hand, and if once the Turkish question is cleared up, he will guide it safely and easily into quiet waters…Ahmad Effendi is a cousin of Mulla Effendi - you remember the charming old man who lives outside the town? We all went to tea with him that afternoon. He too is a staunch as steel.

Other British administrators and advisers such as Lieut.-Colonel Sir Rupert Hay, the British Political Officer of Erbil, author of "Two Years in Kurdistan. Experiences of a Political Officer 1918-1920", and Cecil John Edmonds, praised his insight and role.
