= Brass Tacks (Pakistani TV program) =

- Genre: News
- Starring: Zaid Zaman Hamid
- Country of origin: Pakistan

Original release
- Network: TV One Pakistan

BrassTacks was a Pakistani weekly defense and strategic political program, hosted by security analyst Zaid Hamid and telecast by News One (Pakistani TV channel). It used to air on Sundays at 8 p.m.

== Background ==
BrassTacks was an analysis of the geopolitical and security situation in Pakistan by Zaid Hamid. The program was hosted by Hamid, and directed and produced by Hassan Durrani.

=== DVD release ===
DVDs of the first eight programs were released in the bookshops of Islamabad and Rawalpindi. These DVDs cover the US' grand strategic plans in world, the concept of greater Israel and their threat to Pakistan, the US war on terror, Pakistan's debacles in Afghan policy, and religious and sectarian terrorism in Pakistan.

The next in line would be the two special editions of spiritual forces programs. This will be followed by the topic of economic terrorism, which is ongoing and would take a few more programs.

== Criticism ==
Some in Pakistan's liberal and left-wing press have severely criticized Zaid Hamid for distorting facts relating to Islam, Pakistan and the West and forming a "cult of denial" around himself. Journalists like Fasi Zaka of The News International, Nadeem F. Paracha of Dawn and Najam Sethi of Daily Times have been Hamid's leading critics.

In the aftermath of the 2008 Mumbai attacks, the program was criticized by the Times of India for stating that the attack was planned by ""Hindu Zionists" and "Western Zionists", including the Mossad.
