= Omer Ahmed Bokhari =

Pakistani Army lieutenant general

Lieutenant General Syed Omer Ahmed Bokhari HI(M)
- عمر احمد بخاری
- Alma mater: Military College Jhelum; Pakistan Military Academy
- Military career
- Allegiance: Pakistan
- Branch: Pakistan Army
- Service years: 1991–present
- Rank: Lieutenant General
- Unit: 22 Baloch Regiment
- Commands: Chief of the General Staff; XI Corps, Peshawar; Pakistan Military Academy; Pakistan Rangers (Sindh)
- Awards: Hilal-e-Imtiaz (Military); Sword of Honour

Syed Omer Ahmed Bokhari HI(M) is a three-star general in the Pakistan Army serving as the Chief of the General Staff (CGS) at the General Headquarters (GHQ), Rawalpindi, following his appointment in October 2026.

He previously served as commander of XI Corps, Peshawar, Vice Chief of General Staff (Alpha), Commandant of the Pakistan Military Academy (PMA), and Director General of Pakistan Rangers (Sindh).

== Early life and education ==
Bokhari was educated at Military College Jhelum before joining the Pakistan Army. He subsequently attended the Pakistan Military Academy at Kakul, Abbottabad, as part of the 84th PMA Long Course. He was commissioned into the 22 Baloch Regiment in 1991 and was awarded the Sword of Honour.

== Military career ==
During his early military career, Bokhari served in several command and staff appointments. As a colonel, he was posted to the Pakistan High Commission in London, where he served as Army and Air Adviser in 2011.

He was promoted to the rank of major general in April 2019. Later that month, he assumed command as Director General of Pakistan Rangers (Sindh), succeeding Major General Muhammad Saeed. He held the appointment until December 2020, when he was succeeded by Major General Iftikhar Hussain Chaudhry.

Following his tenure with the Rangers, Bokhari served as Commandant of the Pakistan Military Academy at Kakul from 2020 to 2022. He subsequently served as Vice Chief of General Staff (Alpha) at GHQ in Rawalpindi.

In May 2024, he was promoted to lieutenant general and appointed commander of the Peshawar-based XI Corps, succeeding Lieutenant General Hassan Azhar Hayat Khan.

In October 2026, Bokhari was appointed Chief of the General Staff at GHQ, Rawalpindi, as part of a reshuffle of senior Pakistan Army appointments. Lieutenant General Muhammad Naeem Akhtar was named as his successor at XI Corps.

== Television appearances ==
Bokhari appeared as a military cadet in the 1991 Pakistani television drama Sunehray Din, directed by Shoaib Mansoor and broadcast on Pakistan Television.

He later appeared in the military drama series Sinf-e-Aahan (2021–2022), portraying the Commandant of the Pakistan Military Academy, a position he held during the series' production.
