= XI Corps (Pakistan) =

Pakistan Army's field maneuver strike corps

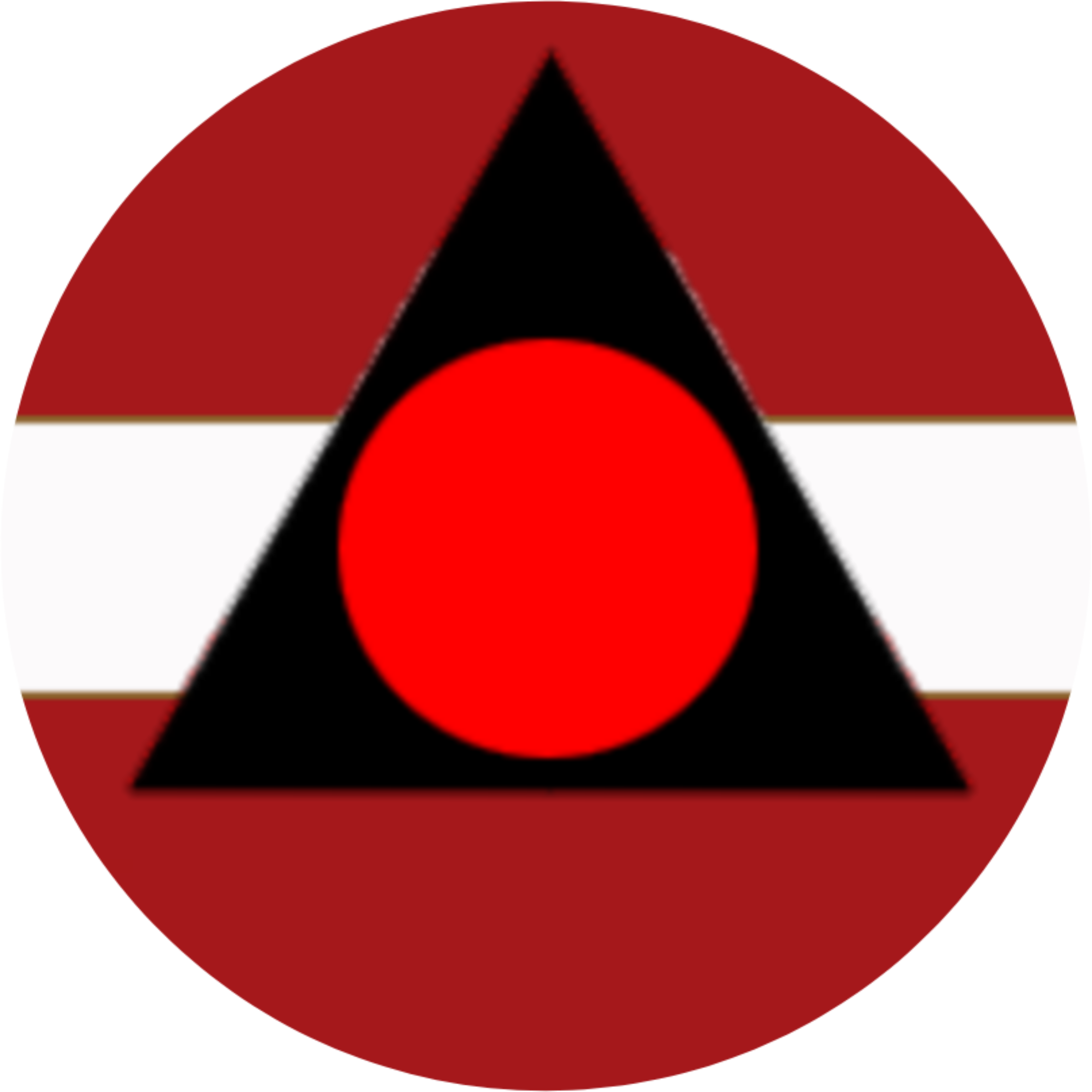
- Corps Insignia
- Active: 1975; 51 years ago
- Country: Pakistan
- Branch: Pakistan Army
- Type: XXX Corps
- Role: Maneuver/Deployment oversight.
- Size: ~75,000 approximately including FC KPK Divisions (Though this may vary as units are rotated)
- HQ/Garrison: Peshawar Cantonment, Khyber-Pakhtunkhwa, Pakistan
- Nickname: Peshawar Corps
- Colors Identification: Red, white and black
- Anniversaries: 1975
- Engagements: Afghanistan conflict: Spillover of Soviet - Afghan war in Pakistan; War on terror; War in Afghanistan; Taliban insurgency in Khyber-Pakhtunkhwa; Civil war in Afghanistan: Afghan Civil War in 1989–92; Afghan Civil War in 1992–96; Afghan Civil War in 1996–01; Terrorism in Central Asia; Afghanistan–Pakistan border conflicts: Pakistan–United States skirmishes; Skirmishes in 2017; Skirmishes in 2020-23; 2026 Afghanistan–Pakistan war
- Decorations: Military Decorations of Pakistan Military

Commanders
- Commander: Lt-Gen. Naeem Akhter
- Notable commanders: Gen. M. A. Beg; Lt-Gen. Masood Aslam; Lt-Gen. Fazle Haq; Lt-Gen. A. J. Aurakzai; Lt-Gen.Faiz Hameed

Insignia
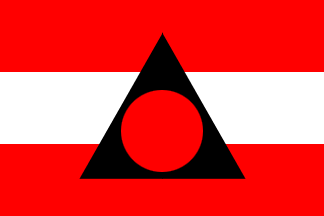
- War Flag

The XI Corps is a field corps of the Pakistan Army, headquartered in Peshawar, Khyber-Pakhtunkhwa in Pakistan.

It has the area of responsibility and to protect the Khyber-Pakhtunkhwa region, which has seen active military actions in the continuous Afghan conflict since its establishment in 1975.

== Overview ==
=== Formation and war service ===
As part of the major reorganization of the Pakistani military in 1974, the XI Corps was one of three corps that were formed to strengthened the national defenses to protect the north–south links from the incursions and secret raids coming from the Afghan National Army. It was followed by V Corps stationed in South, having headquartered in Peshawar Cantonment with Lt-Gen. Majeed Malik becoming its first commander in 1975.

The XI Corps structure is based on 7th Inf. Div. and the 9th Inf. Div. with the armored, engineering, and signal brigades and elements of the Frontier Corps being its part.

Similar to the X Corps, the XI Corps has an area of expertise in mountain warfare, and sometimes, it is included in the Northern Command— though it is the X Corps that leads the Northern Command overall.

Due to its deployment in sensitive border areas and mission parameters to prevent Afghan Army or insurgents' adventures in western fronts, the XI Corps has seen more military actions against the former Soviet Army, the former Afghan National Army and then the insurgents than any of Pakistan's field corps deployed in other fronts since the 1980.

== Structure ==
Based on the known information to the public release, the order of battle (ORBAT) is subject to troops rotation based on a strategic calculations by the Pakistani war strategists.

Although, the XI Corps has permanent infantry divisions with engineering and signal brigades in its support, the XI Corps has received reinforcements from local law enforcement agencies, army's special forces, and the elements of the Frontier Corps during the heights of the military operations in the war on terror theater.

In Khyber Pakhtunkhwa (KP), the Pakistan Army fields two regular divisions—the 11th Infantry Division at Peshawar and the 7th Infantry Division at Miranshah—along with supporting brigades and regiments. These are conventional formations, formally part of the Army’s order of battle.Pak Army 7th Infantry Division — also known as the “Golden Arrow Division”. It is one of the Army’s oldest and most battle‑tested divisions.The officers and soldiers of the Golden Arrow Division have participated in every war fought by Pakistan, earning a distinguished record of combat service unmatched by any other formation.After 9/11, and the United States led invasion of Afghanistan, the Golden Arrows would be called into a period of almost continuous action in difficult and mountainous terrain, carrying out operations in Waziristan and the North West Frontier Province (now called: Khyber-Pakhtunkhwa), against Al-Qaeda and Taliban escaping from Afghanistan. Most of the Al-Qaeda operatives have been captured by elements of this formation.

By contrast, the Frontier Corps (FC) is a paramilitary force under the Ministry of Interior, though commanded by Army officers. Its FC KPK North and FC KPK South formations operate in the same geographic areas as the Army divisions, but they are not classified as Army divisions. Instead, they function as division‑like paramilitary corps, each led by a Major General, with their own regiments and battalion‑sized wings but they assist Pak Army war against terror under the command of XI Corps. The XI corps is based in the following areas:

Structure of XI Corps
Corps	Corps HQ	Corps Commander	Assigned Units	Commander	Unit HQ
XI Corps	Peshawar	Lt. Gen Naeem Akhter	7th Infantry Division	Major General; Adil Iftikhar Warriach	Miranshah
XI Corps	Peshawar	Lt. Gen Naeem Akhter	9th Infantry Division	Major General; Shahid Amir Afsar	Kohat
XI Corps	Peshawar	Lt. Gen Naeem Akhter	FC KPK (North)	Major General; Rao Imran Sartaj	Peshawar
XI Corps	Peshawar	Lt. Gen Naeem Akhter	FC KPK (South)	Major General; Mehr Omer Khan	Lower South Waziristan District
XI Corps	Peshawar	Lt. Gen Naeem Akhter	Independent Armoured Brigade		Nowshera
XI Corps	Peshawar	Lt. Gen Naeem Akhter	Independent Engineering Brigade		U/I Location
XI Corps	Peshawar	Lt. Gen Naeem Akhter	Independent Signal Brigade		U/I Location

== List of Commanders XI Corps ==
Lieutenant-General	Name	Start of Term	End of Term
Lieutenant-General	Majeed Malik	April 1975	March 1976
Lieutenant-General	Sawar Khan	March 1976	January 1978
Lieutenant-General	Fazle Haq	January 1978	March 1980
Lieutenant-General	Chaudhri Abdul Majid	March 1980	April 1984
Lieutenant-General	Muhammad Iqbal	April 1984	October 1985
Lieutenant-General	Mirza Aslam Beg	October 1985	January 1987
Lieutenant-General	Ahmad Kamal Khan	January 1987	February 1989
Lieutenant-General	Rehm Dil Bhatti	February 1989	September 1990
Lieutenant-General	Farrakh Khan	September 1990	August 1991
Lieutenant-General	Ayaz Ahmad	August 1991	May 1994
Lieutenant-General	Mumtaz Gul	May 1994	October 1996
Lieutenant-General	Saeed uz Zafar	October 1996	March 2000
Lieutenant-General	Imtiaz Shaheen	March 2000	April 2001
Lieutenant-General	Ehsan ul Haq	April 2001	October 2001
Lieutenant-General	Ali Jan Aurakzai	October 2001	March 2004
Lieutenant-General	Safdar Hussain	March 2004	September 2005
Lieutenant-General	Mohammad Hamid Khan	September 2005	April 2007
Lieutenant-General	Masood Aslam,	April 2007	April 2010
Lieutenant-General	Asif Yasin Malik	April 2010	December 2011
Lieutenant-General	Khalid Rabbani	December 2011	December 2014
Lieutenant-General	Hidayat Ur Rehman	December 2014	December 2016
Lieutenant-General	Nazir Ahmed Butt	December 2016	October 2018
Lieutenant-General	Shaheen Mazhar Mehmood	October 2018	November 2019
Lieutenant-General	Nauman Mehmood	November 2019	November 2021
Lieutenant-General	Faiz Hameed	November 2021	8 August 2022
	Sardar Hassan Azhar Hayat Khan	8 August 2022	16 May 2024
	Syed Omer Ahmed Bokhari	17 May 2024	October 2026
	Naeem Akhter	October 2026	Incumbent
