= Henry Mortimer Poulton =

- Born: 23 April 1898
- Died: 1 September 1973

Lieutenant-Colonel Henry Mortimer Poulton CIE (23 April 1898 – 1 September 1973) was a British Indian Army and Indian Political Service officer.

Commissioned into the Indian Army in 1917, he joined the Indian Political Department in 1922. He was created a Companion of the Order of the Indian Empire in the 1942 New Year Honours and was Chief Commissioner of Balochistan in 1946, shortly before Indian independence. He retired in 1947.

Political offices
Preceded by Sir Rupert Hay	Chief Commissioner of Balochistan; 14 May 1946–1946	Succeeded by Sir Geoffrey Prior
