= Cecil Savidge =

Chief Commissioner of Balochistan (1905–1975)

- Born: Cecil Arthur Grant Savidge; 20 May 1905; Assam, British India
- Died: 9 December 1975 (aged 70); Little Kingshill, Buckinghamshire

Cecil Arthur Grant Savidge MBE (20 May 1905 – 9 December 1975) was a British colonial administrator who was the second Chief Commissioner of Balochistan after the independence of Pakistan.

He was appointed a Member of the Order of the British Empire (MBE) in the 1941 New Year Honours.

Political offices
Preceded by Ambrose Flux Dundas	Chief Commissioner of Balochistan; 9 April 1948 – 18 January 1949	Succeeded by Sahibzada Mohammad Kursheed
