= Fazle Haq =

Pakistani Army general (1928–1991)

Lieutenant General Fazle Haq HI(M) SBt
- فضل حق
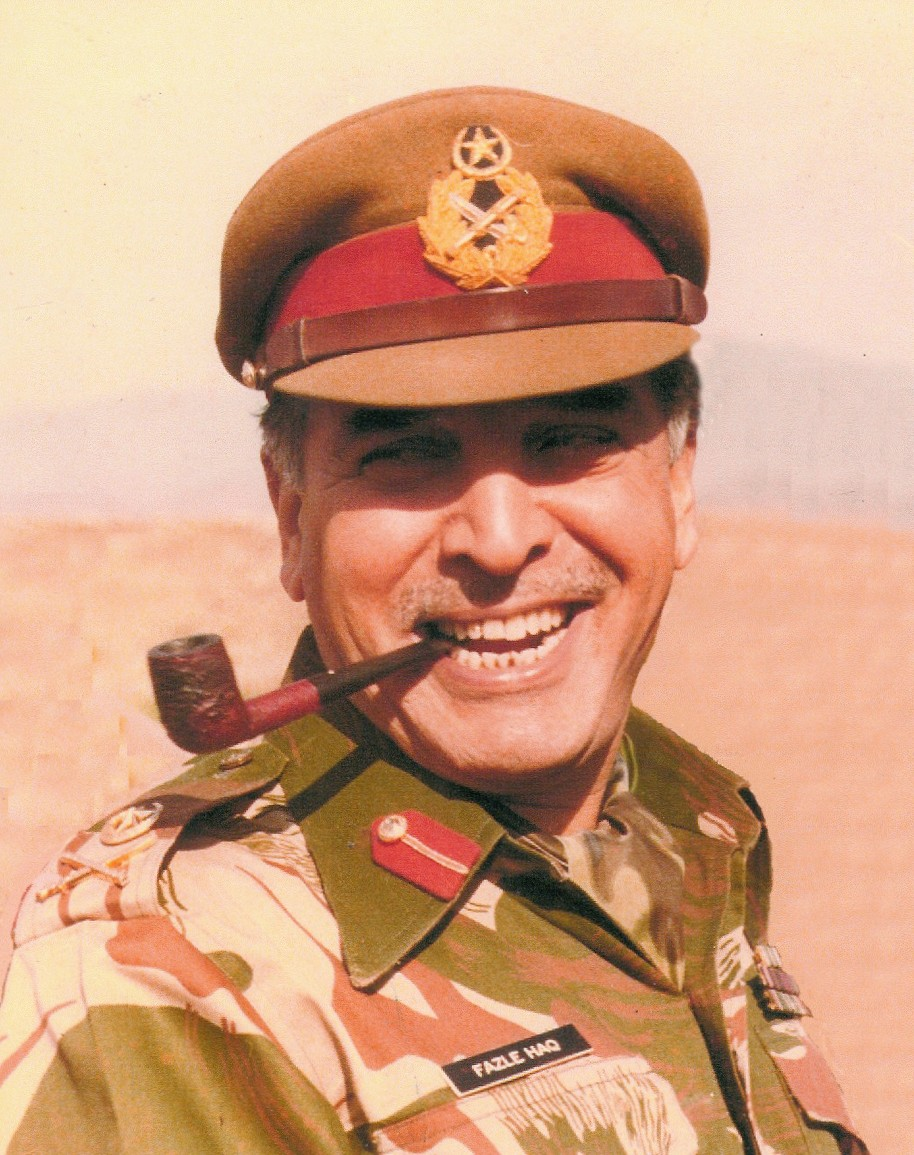

14th Governor of Khyber Pakhtunkhwa
- In office 11 October 1978 – 12 December 1985
- President: Muhammad Zia-ul-Haq
- Preceded by: Abdul Hakeem Khan
- Succeeded by: Abdul Ghafoor Khan Hoti

Caretaker Chief Minister of Khyber Pakhtunkhwa
- In office 31 May 1988 – 2 December 1988
- Governor: Fida Mohammad Khan; Amir Gulistan Janjua
- Preceded by: Arbab Jehangir Khan
- Succeeded by: Aftab Ahmad Khan Sherpao

Personal details
- Born: 10 September 1928 Mardan, Khyber Pakhtunkhwa, Pakistan
- Died: 3 October 1991 (aged 63) Mardan, Khyber Pakhtunkhwa, Pakistan
- Awards: Hilal-e-Imtiaz (Military); Sitara-e-Basalat
- Nickname: General Fazle Haq

Military service
- Allegiance: Pakistan
- Branch/service: Pakistan Army
- Years of service: 1951–1985
- Rank: Lieutenant General
- Unit: 10th Guides Cavalry-Armoured Corps
- Commands: 6th Armoured Division; 7th Infantry Division; XI Corps
- Battles/wars: Indo-Pakistan War of 1965; Indo-Pakistani War of 1971; Soviet–Afghan War

Fazle Haq HI(M) SBt (Pashto/ Urdu: فضل حق; 10 September 1928 – 3 October 1991), was a three-star rank general in the Pakistan Army who became the Governor of Khyber Pakhtunkhwa during the Presidency of Zia-ul-Haq. He was the "Corps-Commander" of the XI Corps, and commanded all the Pakistan Army assets assigned in the Khyber-Pakhtunkhwa Province. He commanded the combatant brigades, and supervised the clandestine covert network during the Soviet–Afghan War. He was one of the leading generals who led the Pakistan Combatant Forces during the Soviet–Afghan War. As Governor, he had set up a network of training of the Afghan mujahideen. Under his command, the elements of Pakistan's administrative XI Corps participated in numerous operations against the Soviet Union.

He served as Governor throughout the Presidency of General Muhammad Zia-ul-Haq from 1978 to 1985 and also served as the caretaker Chief Minister of the province in the latter half of 1988.

== Army career ==
As an army officer, Fazle Haq was commissioned in the Guides Cavalry (Frontier Force) regiment of the Armoured Corps. He was instructor at Pakistan Military Academy in 1953–54 at the rank of captain. During the Indo-Pakistani War of 1965, then Major Fazle Haq was part of the Guides Cavalry in the 6th Armoured Division, when the regiment launched a two-squadron attack at Phillaurah on 11 September. The attack was targeted against the Indian 1st Armoured Division, and as a result both sides faced heavy casualties. This was presumed a Pakistani victory, as the fighting did not resume until 13 September, as the enemy was more cautious. However, it was a Pyrrhic victory.

As a lieutenant-colonel, Fazle Haq commanded his own regiment, the Guides Cavalry, during 1968 and 1969. Then by 1975, as a major general, he took over the 6th Armoured Division stationed at Kharian. Now promoted to lieutenant general, Haq was the commander of XI Corps at Peshawar from January 1978 to March 1980. By this time, General Zia-ul-Haq had imposed a martial law in the country, and Fazle Haq was concurrently appointed the Governor of Khyber-Pakhtunkhwa. After retirement from the army in 1980, he stayed on as the governor, finally relinquishing the charge in December 1985 when the martial law was lifted in the country. During his time as governor and corps commander, he was considered one of President Zia-ul Haq's closest confidantes and a key architect of the Afghan mujahidin groups. He was actively involved with Afghan mujahidin groups, including Gulbuddin Hekmatyar until the end of the Soviet-Afghan war and often met with high-ranking CIA and government officials, including Attorney General of the United States William F. Smith and other political key figures for funding and support for the Afghan Jihad. He remains well respected and well known among the people of Khyber-Pakhtunkhwa for services rendered during his tenure as governor.

== Family and personal life ==
Fazle Haq was born on 10 September 1928, in Mardan (NWFP, British India), now Khyber Pakhtunkhwa, Pakistan, to an ethnic Pashtun family. Fazle Haq had two sisters and three brothers. His father, Pir Fazle Khaliq, served as a civil servant. His eldest brother was Major General Fazl-i- Raziq who was chairman of WAPDA and Pakistan ambassador to several countries. His other brothers were Pir Fazle Hussain and Pir Fazle Rehman.

Fazle Haq studied in Mardan up to Grade 3 and pursued his education up to class 8 in Kohat from 1935 to 1939. He then joined Prince of Wales Royal Indian Military College, Dehradun, for further education.

== Political career ==
He was governor of the province from October 1978 to December 1985. He remained senator from March 1988 to December 1988, member of the National Assembly from November 1988 to August 1990. He also served as caretaker chief minister of the province from 31 May 1988 to 2 December 1988. He was also the provincial president of Pakistan Muslim League.

He contested and lost the 1988 general elections from his home town of Mardan; however, he won from Kohistan. In the next elections, he won from Malakand with an overwhelming majority and remained a member of the NWFP provincial assembly until his assassination in 1991. He also remained as caretaker chief minister of NWFP.

== Pakistan Football Federation ==
Haq served as president of the Pakistan Football Federation between 1981 and 1988.

== Death ==
On 3 October 1991, Fazle Haq was shot dead on his way home from the provincial assembly session by an unknown assailant. He was buried in Peshawar at the Cantonment Board graveyard on Warsak road.

== Awards and decorations ==

Hilal-e-Imtiaz (Military) (Crescent of Excellence)		Sitara-e-Basalat (Star of Good Conduct)	
Sitara-e-Harb 1965 War (War Star 1965)	Sitara-e-Harb 1971 War (War Star 1971)	Tamgha-e-Jang 1965 War (War Medal 1965)	Tamgha-e-Jang 1971 War (War Medal 1971)
Pakistan Tamgha (Pakistan Medal) 1947	Tamgha-e-Sad Saala Jashan-e- Wiladat-e-Quaid-e-Azam (100th Birth Anniversary of Muhammad Ali Jinnah) 1976	Tamgha-e-Jamhuria (Republic Commemoration Medal) 1956	Hijri Tamgha (Hijri Medal) 1979

Political offices
Preceded by Abdul Hakeem Khan	Governor of Khyber-Pakhtunkhwa; 1977–1985	Succeeded by Nawabzada Abdul Ghafoor Khan Hoti
Preceded by Arbab Jehangir Khan	Caretaker Chief Minister of Khyber Pakhtunkhwa; 1988	Succeeded by Aftab Ahmad Sherpao
