= Governor of Khyber Pakhtunkhwa =

Appointed head of the province of Khyber Pakhtunkhwa, Pakistan

- د خیبر پښتونخوا والي
- Government Seal

- Government Flag

- Incumbent; Faisal Karim Kundi since 4 May 2024
- Government of Khyber Pakhtunkhwa
- Style: The Honorable (formal)
- Residence: KP Governor House
- Seat: Peshawar
- Nominator: Prime Minister of Pakistan
- Appointer: President of Pakistan
- Term length: 5 years
- Constituting instrument: Constitution of Pakistan
- Formation: 15 August 1947; 79 years ago
- First holder: George Cunningham (as Governor of North-West Frontier Province)
- Website: https://governor.kp.gov.pk/

The Governor of Khyber Pakhtunkhwa (formerly known as Governor of North-West Frontier Province) is the appointed head of state of the provincial government in Khyber Pakhtunkhwa (formerly North-West Frontier Province, or NWFP), Pakistan. Although the governor is the head of the province on paper, it is largely a ceremonial position; the main powers lie with the elected Chief Minister of Khyber Pakhtunkhwa and Chief Secretary Khyber Pakhtunkhwa, the senior-most bureaucrat in the province.

However, throughout the history of Pakistan, the powers of the provincial governors were vastly increased, when the provincial assemblies were dissolved and the administrative role came under direct control of the governors, as in the cases of martial laws of 1958–1972 and 1977–1985, and governor rules of 1999–2002. In the case of Khyber Pakhtunkhwa, there were two direct governor rules, in 1975 and 1994, when the provincial chief ministers of those times were removed and assemblies dissolved.

== List of governors ==
No.	Name	Took office	Left office	Affiliation	Term length
1	Sir George Cunningham	15 August 1947	9 April 1948	Indian Civil Service	238 days
2	Sir Ambrose Dundas Flux Dundas	19 April 1948	16 July 1949	Indian Civil Service	1 year, 88 days
3	Sahibzada Mohammad Khurshid	16 July 1949	14 January 1950	Independent	182 days
4	Mohammad Ibrahim Khan Jhagra	14 January 1950	17 February 1950	Judiciary	34 days
5	Ismail Ibrahim Chundrigar	17 February 1950	23 November 1951	Muslim League	1 year, 279 days
6	Khwaja Shahabuddin	24 November 1951	17 November 1954	Muslim League	2 years, 358 days
7	Qurban Ali Shah	17 November 1954	14 October 1955	Independent	331 days
Provinces merged to form West Pakistan (14 October 1955 – 1 July 1970)
8	Lt Gen K. M. Azhar	1 July 1970	25 December 1971	Presidency of Yahya Khan	1 year, 177 days
9	Hayat Sherpao	25 December 1971	30 April 1972	Pakistan Peoples Party	127 days
10	Arbab Sikandar Khan	29 April 1972	15 February 1973	National Awami Party	292 days
11	Aslam Khattak	15 February 1973	24 May 1974	National Awami Party	1 year, 98 days
12	Syed Ghawas	24 May 1974	1 March 1976	Pakistan Peoples Party	1 year, 282 days
13	Naseerullah Babar	1 March 1976	6 July 1977	Pakistan Peoples Party	1 year, 127 days
14	Abdul Hakeem Khan	6 July 1977	17 September 1978	Civil Administration	1 year, 73 days
15	Lt Gen Fazle Haq	11 October 1978	12 December 1985	Presidency of Zia-ul-Haq	7 years, 62 days
16	Nawabzada Abdul Ghafoor Khan Hoti	30 December 1985	18 April 1986	Jamiat Ulema-e-Islam	109 days
17	Syed Usman Ali Shah	18 April 1986	27 August 1986	Civil Administration	131 days
18	Fida Mohammad Khan	27 August 1986	16 June 1988	Pakistan Muslim League (F)	1 year, 294 days
19	Amir Gulistan Janjua	16 June 1988	19 July 1993	Independent	5 years, 33 days
20	Khurshid Ali Khan	19 July 1993	5 November 1996	Pakistan Peoples Party	3 years, 109 days
21	Arif Bangash	11 November 1996	17 August 1999	Independent	2 years, 279 days
22	Miangul Aurangzeb	18 August 1999	21 October 1999	Pakistan Muslim League (N)	64 days
23	Lt Gen Mohammad Shafiq	21 October 1999	14 August 2000	Presidency of Pervez Musharraf	298 days
24	Lt Gen Iftikhar Hussain Shah	14 August 2000	15 March 2005	Presidency of Pervez Musharraf	4 years, 213 days
25	Khalilur Rehman	15 March 2005	23 May 2006	Pakistan Muslim League (Q)	1 year, 69 days
26	Lt Gen Ali Jan Orakzai	24 May 2006	7 January 2008	Presidency of Pervez Musharraf	1 year, 228 days
27	Owais Ahmed Ghani	7 January 2008	9 February 2011	Independent	3 years, 33 days
28	Syed Masood Kausar	10 February 2011	10 February 2013	Pakistan Peoples Party	2 years, 0 days
29	Shaukatullah Khan	10 February 2013	14 April 2014	Pakistan Peoples Party	1 year, 63 days
30	Mehtab Ahmed Khan Abbasi	15 April 2014	8 February 2016	Pakistan Muslim League (N)	1 year, 299 days
31	Iqbal Zafar Jhagra	25 February 2016	20 August 2018	Pakistan Muslim League (N)	2 years, 176 days
32	Shah Farman	5 September 2018	16 April 2022	Pakistan Tehreek-e-Insaf	3 years, 223 days
33	Haji Ghulam Ali	23 November 2022	4 May 2024	Jamiat Ulema-e-Islam (F)	1 year, 163 days
34	Faisal Karim Kundi	5 May 2024	Incumbent	Pakistan People’s Party Governor Rule (October 11 - Present)	2 years, 185 days

== See also ==
- Chief Minister of Khyber Pakhtunkhwa
- Government of Khyber Pakhtunkhwa
- Provincial Assembly of Khyber Pakhtunkhwa
- List of current Pakistani governors
- List of current Pakistani chief ministers
