= Akbar Khan Hoti =

Pakistani police officer

Nawabzada M. Akbar Khan Hoti

22nd IG of KP Police
- In office 25 October 2011 – 16 April 2013
- Preceded by: Fiaz Ahmad Khan Toru
- Succeeded by: Lt. Cdr (R) Ihsan Ghani

34th Director General of FIA
- In office 25 November 2014 – February 2016
- Preceded by: M. Ghalib Ali Bandesha
- Succeeded by: Capt(R) Syed Muhammad Abid Qadri

Personal details
- Born: 8 February 1956 (age 70) Mardan
- Parent: Nawabzada Abdul Ghafoor Khan Hoti (father)
- Relatives: Nawab Akbar Khan Hoti (grandfather)

Nawabzada Muhammad Akbar Khan Hoti (born 8 February 1956) is a retired Pakistani police officer. He served as Inspector General of Khyber Pakhtunkhwa Police (25 October 2011 to 16 April 2013) and Director General of FIA (25 November 2014 to February 2016).
