= Owais Ahmed Ghani =

Pakistani politician

27th Governor of Khyber Pakhtunkhwa
- In office 7 January 2008 – 9 February 2011
- Chief Ministers: Shamsul Mulk; Haider Khan Hoti
- Preceded by: Ali Jan Aurakzai
- Succeeded by: Syed Masood Kausar

18th Governor of Balochistan
- In office 11 August 2003 – 5 February 2008
- Chief Ministers: Jam Mohammad Yousaf; Mohammad Saleh Bhootani
- Preceded by: Abdul Qadir Baloch
- Succeeded by: Zulfiqar Ali Magsi

Personal details
- Born: 5 February 1951 (age 75) Nowshera, Khyber Pakhtunkhwa, Pakistan
- Relations: Sardar Abdur Rab Nishtar (uncle); Abdul Waheed Kakar (cousin); Safwat Ghayur (cousin)
- Occupation: Politician; Mechanical engineer

Owais Ahmed Ghani (Urdu: اویس غنی احمد) is a Pakistani politician who served as the governor of the Khyber Pakhtunkhwa province of Pakistan in 2008-2011, having previously been governor of the southwestern province of Balochistan for four and a half years (2003-2008).

He is a mechanical engineer by profession.

== Early life and education ==
Ghani belongs to the Pashtun-Kakar tribe and was born on 5 February 1951 in Nowshera, Khyber Pakhtunkhwa. He is the nephew of Sardar Abdur Rab Nishtar, one of the founding fathers of Pakistan, son of his brother Sardar Abdul Ghani who was a career police officer. He is the cousin of General Abdul Waheed Kakar, former Chief of Army Staff of Pakistan as well of the martyred Commandant of the Frontier Constabulary, Safwat Ghayur.

He studied mechanical engineering at the University of Peshawar, graduating in 1971.

== Political career ==
He became active in politics in 1996 being one of the founding members of Pakistan Tehreek-e-Insaf led by cricketer Imran Khan. Following the party's routing in the 1997 general elections, he subsequently quit in protest against several controversial figures joining the party. In 1999, he joined the Khyber-Pakhtunkhwa provincial cabinet, serving as provincial minister for Industry from 1999 to 2002.

He was in 2002 appointed as Federal Minister for Environment following the resignation of Omer Asghar Khan. Following the 2002 general elections, he was appointed Governor of Balochistan. His period as Balochistan governor was controversial, especially following the murder of Nawab Akbar Bugti and Baloch protests against Federal rule. Ghani admitted there were problems with the law and order situation and drugs in Quetta, the capital of Balochistan, due to instability in neighboring Afghanistan.

He became governor of Khyber-Pakhtunkhwa in January 2008 after the former governor, Ali Jan Aurakzai, stepped down. Ghani gained a reputation for being tough with militants during his tenure as governor of Balochistan,

He is the third man (the first being Rahimuddin Khan and the second being Miangul Aurangzeb) in the history of Pakistan to have held the governorship of two provinces.

== Books ==
- Pakistan 2013: Views on Statecraft, Politics and Governance, Lahore : Sang-e-Meel Publications, 2013, 239 p.
- Where the Hunting Eagles Soar, Rawalpindi : Brass Tacks Publishing, 2015, 90 p. English translation of selected poems from Allama Iqbal.
- Constitutional Framework For An Islamic Welfare State In Pakistan, Rawalpindi : Brass Tacks Publishing, 2015, 173 p.

Political offices
Preceded by Abdul Qadir Baloch	Governor of Balochistan; 2003 – 2008	Succeeded by Amanullah Khan Yasinzai; Acting
Preceded by Ali Jan Aurakzai	Governor of Khyber-Pakhtunkhwa; 2008 – 2011	Succeeded by Syed Masood Kausar
