= Ali Jan Orakzai =

Pakistani general (born 1947)

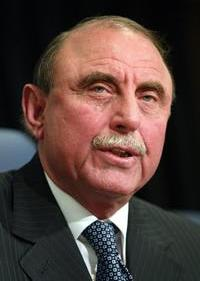

26th Governor of Khyber Pakhtunkhwa
- In office 23 May 2006 – 8 January 2008
- President: General Pervez Musharraf
- Prime Minister: Shaukat Aziz
- Preceded by: Cdr Khalilur Rehman, PN
- Succeeded by: Owais Ahmed Ghani

Personal details
- Born: Ali Muhammad Jan Orakzai; 1947 (age 78–79) Hangu, Hangu District, Orakzai Agency, Khyber-Pakhtunkhwa
- Education: Pakistan Military Academy; Command & Staff College Quetta
- Awards: Tamgha-i-Khidmat
- Nickname: General Jan Orakzai

Military service
- Allegiance: Pakistan
- Branch/service: Pakistan Army
- Years of service: 1965–2004
- Rank: Lieutenant General
- Unit: Frontier Force Regiment
- Commands: XI Corps; Northern Military Command; Adjutant General; Western Military Command
- Battles/wars: Indo-Pakistani War of 1971; Soviet–Afghan War; Indo-Pakistani War of 1999; War in North-West Pakistan

Ali Muhammad Jan Orakzai (Urdu language: على محمدجان اوركزى Pashto language: علي محمد جان یاکزی ), is a retired three-star rank general officer in the Pakistan Army who served as the Corps Commander of XI Corps and the principle commander of the Western Command. As Commander, he commanded all military combat assets and oversaw the peaceful deployment of XI Corps in the Northern Areas and the Federally Administered Tribal Areas (FATA).

Orakzai was the leading army general who led the Pakistan combatant forces in response to the American invasion of Afghanistan as an aftermath of the terrorist attacks in the United States. After retiring from the military he was elevated as the governor of the Khyber-Pakhtunkhwa of Pakistan, from May 2006 until his resignation in January 2008.

As Major General, Orakzai later served as the Commander FCNA in Gilgit. In 1998, still as Major-General, he was the Vice Chief of General Staff at the GHQ. Court-martial Lieutenant-General Ziauddin Butt held Orakzai, responsible for the coup d'état against Former Prime minister Nawaz Sharif.

In April 1999, he was promoted to Lieutenant General and shifted as Adjutant General (AG) to the GHQ. In October 2001, he was made Corps commander of the XI Corps and served as the Commander of the Western Military Command. During his military career, he was the leading and most experienced general who served under the Musharraf Administration. Following the collapse of the Taliban regime in Afghanistan, Orakzai was made the commander of Western Military Command. As commander, he oversaw the extensive military operations led by the United States special operations forces. He responded by deploying hundreds of Mountaineering and Infantry battalions to guard the Pakistan-Afghanistan border, many of whom were redeployed as a result of the 2001 Indian Parliament attack.

A tribal Pashtun and as someone who himself belongs to the Federally Administered Tribal Areas, the appointment of Lt. General retired Ali Jan Orakzai as the new Governor of Khyber Pakhtunkhwa was welcomed by tribesmen in FATA. The tribal leaders expressed positive reviews as they had personally known Orakzai. Orakzai sought to end the violence in Khyber and FATA regions. He was one of the pioneers and strongly advocated the Waziristan Accord.

== Book ==
- Beyond Tora Bora: The Aurakzai Memoirs, Olympia Publishers, 2017, 370 p.

Political offices
Preceded by Khalilur Rehman	Governor of Khyber-Pakhtunkhwa; 2006–2008	Succeeded by Owais Ahmed Ghani
