= Abdul Hakeem Khan =

Pakistani politician

Chief Justice Abdul Hakeem Khan Retired

Chief Justice of the Peshawar High Court
- In office 1 November 1976 – 3 October 1979

13th Governor of Khyber Pakhtunkhwa
- In office 5 July 1977 – 17 September 1978
- President: Fazal Ilahi Chaudhry; Muhammad Zia-ul-Haq
- Preceded by: Naseerullah Khan Babar
- Succeeded by: Fazle Haq

Personal details
- Born: Abdul Hakeem Khan; Actual 11 September 1918 Official 4 Oct 1917
- Died: 4 January 2007 (aged 90) Islamabad, Pakistan
- Spouse: Ghulam Fatima
- Children: 10
- Relatives: [Dr Nayyar Ramzan and Hazrat Sultan Brothers, Mufti Muhammad Idris and Maj Fazal ur Rahman brother in laws. Sons Lt Col Abdul Quddus Retd, Late Justice Abdul Rauf Lughmani and Brig Asad Hakeem Retd ]

Abdul Hakeem Khan Swati was a former governor of the Khyber Pakhtunkhwa province of Pakistan and former Chief Justice of Peshawar High Court. He belonged to Swati tribe of Baffa, the largest Union Council of Mansehra District. He was appointed the Governor of North-West Frontier Province (now Khyber Pakhtunkhwa) when General Zia-ul-Haq imposed martial law on 5 July 1977 and appointed all provincial chief justices as governors of respective provinces. Khan died on 4 January 2007, aged 90. He belonged to Lughmani family of the Sarkheli subsection of Swati tribe.

Political offices
Preceded by Naseerullah Babar	Governor of Khyber-Pakhtunkhwa; 1977–1978	Succeeded by Fazle Haq
