= Ambrose Flux Dundas =

Pakistani politician

Sir Ambrose Flux Dundas KCIE CSI

19th Lieutenant Governor of the Isle of Man
- In office 9 September 1952 – 7 September 1959
- Monarch: Elizabeth II
- Preceded by: Sir Geoffrey Bromet
- Succeeded by: Sir Ronald Garvey

2nd Governor of North-West Frontier Province
- In office 8 April 1948 – 16 July 1949
- Monarch: King George VI
- Governors-General: Muhammad Ali Jinnah; Khawaja Nazimuddin
- Preceded by: George Cunningham
- Succeeded by: Sahibzada Mohammad Kursheed

Chief Commissioner of Balochistan
- In office 4 October 1947 – 8 April 1948
- Monarch: King George VI
- Preceded by: Sir Geoffrey Prior
- Succeeded by: Cecil Savidge

Personal details
- Born: Ambrose Dundas Flux Dundas; 14 April 1899
- Died: 29 April 1973 (aged 74) Binfield, Berkshire, England
- Spouse: Mary Forest Bracewell
- Children: One daughter
- Education: Christ Church, Oxford
- Occupation: Civil servant

Sir Ambrose Dundas Flux Dundas KCIE CSI (14 April 1899 – 29 April 1973) was a British civil servant and colonial administrator in British India in what later became Pakistan. He was also Lieutenant Governor of the Isle of Man from 1952 to 1959.

== Career ==
Flux Dundas was born in 1899, the son of Reverend Alfred William Flux Dundas. He was educated at the Harrow School, the Royal Military Academy, Woolwich, and Christ Church, Oxford.

He joined the Indian Civil Service in 1922 at the age of 23, and remained in the ICS until 1947, when the independence of Pakistan took place. He served as the last British governor of Khyber-Pakhtunkhwa (then called the North-West Frontier Province) of Pakistan from 1948 to 1949.

From 1952 to 1959 he was Lieutenant Governor of the Isle of Man. Prior to his appointment as Lieutenant Governor, Flux Dundas had been general manager of the Bracknell Development Corporation, an eight-member committee administering the construction and development of Bracknell New Town. He returned to the BDC in 1959, serving as its chairman until 1967.

He married Mary Forest Bracewell in 1931. They had one daughter, Anstice Ann Flux Dundas, born 12 December 1933 in Peshawar.

Flux Dundas died on 29 April 1973 at "Roxwell", his house in Binfield, Berkshire.

== Honours ==
Flux Dundas was made a Companion of the Order of the Star of India (CSI) in 1946, and was knighted KCIE (Knight Commander of the Order of the Indian Empire) in 1948.

Government offices
Preceded by Geoffrey Prior	Chief Commissioner of Balochistan; 1947–1948	Succeeded by Cecil Arthur Grant Savidge
Preceded by Sir George Cunningham	Governor of North-West Frontier Province; 1948–1949	Succeeded by Sahibzada Mohammad Khurshid
Preceded by Sir Geoffrey Bromet	Lieutenant Governor of the Isle of Man; 1952–1959	Succeeded by Sir Ronald Garvey
