= Iftikhar Hussain Shah =

Pakistani politician (1949–2020)

Syed Iftikhar Hussain Shah

Governor of Khyber Pakhtunkhwa
- In office 14 August 2000 – 15 March 2005
- President: Pervez Musharraf
- Preceded by: Mohammad Shafiq
- Succeeded by: Khalilur Rehman

Personal details
- Born: 14 March 1949
- Died: 15 March 2020 (aged 71) Kohat, Pakistan
- Children: 3
- Occupation: Lieutenant General, Politician

Military service
- Allegiance: Pakistan
- Branch/service: Pakistan Army
- Years of service: 1964 - 2000
- Commands: Army Air Defense Command Deputy Director General ISI
- Battles/wars: Indo-Pakistan War of 1965; Indo-Pakistani War of 1971; 1999 Kargil War

Syed Iftikhar Hussain Shah (14 March 1949 – 15 March 2020) was a governor of the Khyber Pakhtunkhwa province of Pakistan.

== Early life and education ==
Syed was born on 14 March 1949 into a family belonging to the Mian (tribe).

== Military Career & Later Life ==
Iftikhar Hussain Shah was commissioned in the Pakistan Army in October 1964 in 30th PMA Long Course and joined an anti-aircraft unit of the Regiment of Artillery. He later joined and graduated from Army Aviation School (at PAF Base Nur Khan) to become a pilot in the army. In 1993, Iftikhar Hussain Shah served in the ISI as the Deputy DG of the External Wing of the ISI under Lt Gen Javed Ashraf Qazi. and in 2000 he was promoted to Lieutenant General.

He was close to General Pervez Musharraf and after retiring he served as Governor of Khyber Pakhtunkhwa, Federal Minister for Communications, and served as Pakistani ambassador to Turkey.

He also worked as the Managing Director of the Zulifqarabad Development Authority (ZDA).

He served as an advisor of the UN to Pakistan.

He joined the political party, Pakistan Tehreek-e-Insaf (PTI) on 21 May 2016.

== Personal life ==
He was married and had three daughters.

== Death ==
He died a day after his 71st birthday on 15 March 2020 in Kohat, Pakistan.

Political offices
Preceded by Mohammad Shafiq	Governor of Khyber Pakhtunkhwa; 2000 – 2005	Succeeded by Khalilur Rehman
