= Syed Usman Ali Shah =

Pakistani politician (1926–2020)

Governor of North-West Frontier Province
- In office April 18, 1986 – August 27, 1986
- President: Muhammad Zia-ul-Haq
- Preceded by: Nawabzada Abdul Ghafoor Khan Hoti
- Succeeded by: Fida Mohammad Khan

Personal details
- Parent: Syed Muhammad Nawab Shah (father)

Syed Usman Ali Shah (1926–2020) was a former governor of the Khyber-Pakhtunkhwa (known as NWFP at the time) province of Pakistan. He acted as the Governor Khyber-Pakhtunkhwa from April to August 1986 after the resignation of Nawabzada Abdul Ghafoor Khan Hoti. He remained the Chief Justice of Peshawar High Court from December 19, 1981 to December 7, 1987. He was elevated as a judge of the Supreme Court of Pakistan in 1987 from which position he retired in January 1991. On March 28, 1991 he took the oath of office as the second permanent Federal Ombudsman of Pakistan and remained in that position until 1995. He remained a Member of the Election Commission of Pakistan from 1980 to 1985, and a Member on the Panel of Permanent International Court of Arbitration at Hague for the 6-year tenure from 1983 to 1989. He died on June 25, 2020 at his residence in University Town, Peshawar.

Political offices
Preceded by Nawabzada Abdul Ghafoor Khan Hoti	Governor of Khyber-Pakhtunkhwa; 1986	Succeeded by Fida Mohammad Khan
