= Mohammad Shafiq =

Pakistani politician (1934–2025)

Lieutenant General Mohammad Shafiq
- محمد شفیق

Governor of Khyber Pakhtunkhwa
- In office 21 October 1999 – 14 August 2000
- President: Rafiq Tarar; General Pervez Musharraf
- Preceded by: Miangul Aurangzeb
- Succeeded by: Iftikhar Hussain Shah

Personal details
- Born: April 1934 Kohat, NWFP, British India
- Died: 13 December 2025 (aged 91)

Military service
- Allegiance: Pakistan
- Branch: Pakistan Army
- Service years: 1956–1991
- Rank: Lieutenant General
- Unit: Punjab Regiment
- Commands: Frontier Corps; XXXI Corps
- Conflict: India–Pakistan war of 1971

Mohammad Shafiq (Urdu: محمد شفیق; April 1934 – 13 December 2025) was a three-star rank army general of the Pakistan Army. He also served as the governor of Khyber-Pakhtunkhwa from 1999 to 2000. He was appointed to that position on 21 October 1999 by General Pervez Musharraf. He then served as Pakistani Ambassador to Bahrain from 2000 to 2002.

== Early life and army career ==
Mohammad Shafiq was born in Kohat in April. He was commissioned in the Punjab Regiment in March 1956 in the 13th PMA Long Course. Lt Gen(R) Mohammad Shafiq has been a high-profile career-oriented officer while serving in Pakistan Army. He successfully raised XXXI Corps in Bahawalpur and added a defensive potent to Pakistan Army in southern region. Lt Gen (R) Shafiq was instrumental in carrying out Gen.(R) Aslam Mirza's defensive-offensive doctrine. This doctrine was successfully displayed in the Pakistan Army's biggest exercise called Zarb-e-Momin, postured against the Indian Army's Exercise Brasstacks. During his 35-year-long military career, General Shafiq served in some important positions, such as the Inspector-General of the Frontier Corps, a posting which provided him with great exposure to the affairs of the country's western borders as well as tribal affairs.

== Post retirement activities ==
After retiring from the army, Shafiq served as chairman of the prime minister's inspection team until 1993. During the caretaker government of Moeen Qureshi, General Shafiq remained a federal minister, looking after the affairs of at least six federal ministries. He was appointed the first chief executive of the Northern Areas when Benazir Bhutto came to power in 1993, but he chose to retire before completing his term. Known to be a mild and soft-spoken person, General Shafiq underwent a heart bypass in 1998.

Shafiq died on 13 December 2025, at the age of 91.

Political offices
Preceded by Miangul Aurangzeb	Governor of Khyber-Pakhtunkhwa; 1999–2000	Succeeded by Iftikhar Hussain Shah
