= Sahibzada Mohammad Khurshid =

Pakistani politician

Sahibzada Mohammad Khurshid صاحبزادہ محمد خورشید

3rd Governor of North-West Frontier Province
- In office 16 July 1949 – 14 January 1950
- Monarch: George VI
- Governor-General: Khawaja Nazimuddin
- Preceded by: Ambrose Flux Dundas
- Succeeded by: Ismail Ibrahim Chundrigar

Sahibzada Mohammad Khurshid (Urdu: صاحبزادہ محمد خورشید, 21 July 1901– 14 January 1950) was the first Pakistani Muslim and Pashtun governor of the Khyber-Pakhtunkhwa previously known as the N.W.F.P (North West Frontier Province) of Pakistan and a former Agent to the Governor General (Chief Commissioner) of Balochistan whilst being an Agent to the Governor General. Prior to the independence of Pakistan, the governor had been appointed by the government of British India (based in Calcutta and later Delhi). For almost two years after independence, Pakistan continued to have British governors until the appointment of Sahibzada Khurshid.

Sahibzada Muhammad Khurshid was the son of Sahibzada Khalil-ur-Rahman educated at Islamia College University, located in Peshawar. He was also educated at the Royal Military College, Sandhurst, from where he was commissioned a Second Lieutenant onto the Unattached List for the Indian Army on the 31 August 1922. He was attached to the 2nd battalion, the Cameronians, as of 12 October 1922, as all new Indian Army officers did a year attached to a British Regiment in India. He was admitted to the Indian Army and posted to the 1st battalion 14th Punjab Regiment as of 23 October 1923. He was promoted Lieutenant 30 November 1924.

He transferred to the Foreign and Political Department of the Government of India 30 June 1927, and by January 1931 he was the Assistant Political Agent, Zhob (Baluchistan).

He was promoted Captain 31 August 1931.

By January 1939 he was the Assistant Political Officer, Chitral, and by October 1939 he was the Political Agent Dir, Swat & Chitral.

Due to his administrative career, he gained the professional support of Muhammad Ali Jinnah, subsequently receiving a high-level political nomination in KPK region.

In 1950, he died of a heart attack while in office.

Political offices
Preceded by Sir Ambrose Dundas Flux Dundas	Governor of Khyber-Pakhtunkhwa; 16 July 1949- 14 January 1950	Succeeded by Mohammad Ibrahim Khan
Preceded by Cecil Arthur Grant Savidge	Chief Commissioner of Balochistan; 19 January 1949 – 16 July 1949	Succeeded by Mian Aminuddin
