= Abdul Ghafoor Hoti =

Pakistani politician

Nawabzada Abdul Ghafoor Khan Hoti

15th Governor of North-West Frontier Province
- In office 30 December 1985 – 13 April 1986
- President: Muhammad Zia-ul-Haq
- Preceded by: Fazle Haq
- Succeeded by: Syed Usman Ali Shah

Personal details
- Children: Muhammad Akbar Khan Hoti
- Parent: Nawab Akbar Khan Hoti (father)

Nawabzada Abdul Ghafoor Khan Hoti (1923–1998) was a governor of North-West Frontier Province. Belonging to Mardan, he was the son of Nawab Akbar Khan Hoti and father of Inspector General of KPK Police Nawabzada Muhammad Akbar Khan Hoti.

He was one of the rare politicians who had said that he would resign from his office, if his son was proven guilty by a court in the United States. He later resigned as promised.

Political offices
Preceded by Fazle Haq	Governor of Khyber-Pakhtunkhwa; 1985–1986	Succeeded by Syed Usman Ali Shah
