= Qurban Ali Khan =

Qurban Ali Khan may refer to:

- Qurban Ali Khan (governor)
- Qurban Ali Khan (politician)
