= Qurban Ali Khan (governor) =

Pakistani politician

6th Governor of North-West Frontier Province
- In office 17 November 1954 – 14 October 1955
- Monarch: Elizabeth II
- Governors-General: Malik Ghulam Muhammad; Iskander Mirza
- Preceded by: Khwaja Shahabuddin
- Succeeded by: Khwaja Mohammad Azhar Khan

Qurban Ali Khan (Urdu: قربان علی خان) was a former governor of the Khyber-Pakhtunkhwa of Pakistan. He remained chief commissioner of Balochistan from 13 February 1953 to 8 November 1954.

Political offices
Preceded by Khwaja Shahabuddin	Governor of Khyber-Pakhtunkhwa; 1954 – 1955	Succeeded by K.M. Azhar Khan
