= Shaukatullah Khan =

Pakistani politician

Shaukhatullah Khan
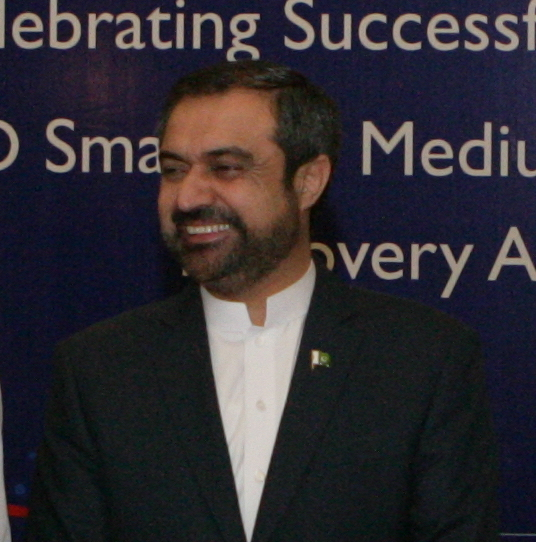

Governor of Khyber Pakhtunkhwa
- In office 11 February 2013 – 14 April 2014
- Preceded by: Syed Masood Kausar
- Succeeded by: Mehtab Abbasi

Personal details
- Born: 2 April 1969 (age 56)

Shaukatullah Khan is a Pakistani politician from Bajaur Agency who served as Governor of Khyber Pakhtunkhwa from February 2013 to April 2014. He was appointed by the President of Pakistan, Asif Ali Zardari, on the advice of the Prime Minister Raja Pervaz Ashraf on 11 February 2013. He replaced Barrister Masood Kausar. Before being appointed as governor, he was holding the portfolio of Federal Minister for States and Frontier Region.

Engineer Shaukatullah Khan was also a member of the National Assembly of Pakistan from NA-43 (Nawagai, Bajaur Agency). The 43-year-old tribesman emerged successful by securing 7,428 votes from NA-43 where his father Bismillah Khan had won twice in 1988 and 1993 elections. Bismillah Khan also served as parliamentary secretary for religious affairs in the National Assembly. His brother, Hidayatullah, is a senator.

Shaukatullah Khan is an alumnus of Cadet College Kohat (CCK), and completed his studies there in 1986. Later pursuing an engineering degree, Shaukatullah took part in student politics in the University of Engineering and Technology, Taxila, in 1988 and later stayed side-by-side with his father.

Also the member of Tribal Chamber of Commerce and Industry and All Pakistan Marbles Industry Association, he had contested his first election from the same constituency in 2002 and finished as runner-up by securing 6,900 votes. His opponent Maulana Sadiq was elected to the National Assembly by grabbing around 13,000 votes. He resigned as Governor of Khyber Pakhtunkhwa after Mehtab Ahmed Khan Abbasi was appointed as Governor of Khyber Pakhtunkhwa on 14 April 2014.

== See also ==
- Governor of Khyber Pakhtunkhwa
