= K. M. Azhar =

Pakistani politician

Khwaja Mohammad Azhar Khan

7th Governor of North-West Frontier Province
- In office 1 July 1970 – 23 December 1971
- President: Agha Yahya Khan; Zulfikar Ali Bhutto
- Preceded by: Qurban Ali Khan
- Succeeded by: Hayat Mohammad Khan Sherpao

Personal details
- Born: January 1918 Aligarh, British India
- Died: 29 October 2006 (aged 88) Lahore, Punjab, Pakistan

Military service
- Allegiance: British India; Pakistan
- Branch/service: British Indian Army; Pakistan Army
- Years of service: 1942 – 1971
- Rank: Lieutenant General
- Unit: Pakistan Army
- Commands: Pakistan Army General Infantry
- Battles/wars: Burma Campaign; World War II; Indo-Pakistani War of 1947; Indo-Pakistani War of 1965; Indo-Pakistani War of 1971

Khwaja Mohammad Azhar Khan (Urdu: خواجہ محمد اظہر خان) (usually shortened to K.M. Azhar) (1918 – 29 October 2006) was the chairman of the high-powered committee of the Jamiat Ulema-e-Pakistan and a former governor of Khyber-Pakhtunkhwa.

== Early life ==
Lt Gen Azhar was born in Saugar, India in 1918 into the (Mian Sheikh Darvesh) Waziris and received his basic education in Aligarh, India.

General K.M. Azhar decided to join Jamiat Ulma-e-Pakistan Party after Maulana Shah Ahmad Noorani convinced him to do so in 1978.

== Death and legacy ==
K.M. Azhar died at the Combined Military Hospital in Lahore on 29 October 2006, after receiving a head injury. He was 88 and was survived by five sons and two daughters; four of the sons being graduates of Cadet College Hasan Abdal.

Upon his death in his remembrance his Waziri tribe named a mountain peak after him in Kaniguram Village Kaniguram of South Waziristan.

Political offices
Preceded by Qurban Ali Khan	Governor of Khyber-Pakhtunkhwa; 1970 – 1971	Succeeded by Hayat Sherpao
