= Khalilur Rehman (governor) =

26th governor of Khyber Pakhtunkhwa

Khalil ur Rehman

Governor of Khyber Pakhtunkhwa
- In office 13 March 2005 – 23 May 2006
- President: Pervez Musharraf
- Preceded by: Lt-Gen. Iftikhar Hussain
- Succeeded by: Lt-Gen. Ali Jan Aurakzai

Deputy Chairman of the Senate of Pakistan
- In office 2003–2006
- Preceded by: Humayun Khan
- Succeeded by: J.M. Jamali

Personal details
- Born: Khalil-ur-Rahman; 5 May 1934 (age 92) Peshawar, North-West Frontier Province, British India (Present-day in Khyber-Pakhtunkhwa in Pakistan)
- Party: Independent

Military service
- Allegiance: Pakistan
- Branch/service: Pakistan Navy
- Years of service: 1954–88
- Rank: Captain (PN No. 543)
- Unit: Operations Branch
- Commands: Royal Bahrain Naval Force
- Battles/wars: Indo-Pakistan War of 1965; Indo-Pakistan War of 1971
- Awards: Hilal-e-Imtiaz (military)

Khalilur Rehman (Urdu: خلیل الرحمن born 5 May 1934) HI(m), best known as Commander Khalil, is a retired naval officer in the Pakistan Navy who served as the Governor of Khyber-Pakhtunkhwa, appointed in 2005 until being replaced in 2006.

In addition, he also commanded the Royal Bahrain Naval Force from 1976 until retiring from his military service in 1988 to pursue career in the politics.

== Biography ==
Khalilur Rehman was born on 5 May 1934 in Peshawar to a Pathan father from Surayzai (a village near Peshawar) and an Afghan mother whose family had been given asylum by the British government from 1931 to 1932. Khalil passed his Matric examination from Islamia High School, Peshawar and FSc from Edwardes College, Peshawar, in 1951. After that he joined Islamia College Peshawar for his BSc.

Pakistan Navy

Khalil joined the Pakistan Navy in 1952. After the initial naval training in Pakistan he went to the UK for training in the Britannia Royal Navy College Dartmouth. He did 20 months of sea-time in RN ships before he was commissioned in 1955. He then did time in the training ship Shamsher in Karachi after which he went back to the UK for further courses: Staff College Greenwich and professional courses in various establishments of the Royal Navy.

Back in Karachi he joined the sloop PNS Jhelum, and after that other ships of the Pakistan Navy. He also served in East Pakistan for more than a year in the anti-smuggling 'Operation Closed Door'. He also held charge of Khulna district as XDO Khulna (Extended Defence Officer Khulna).

Khalil went to UK again, for specializing in Navigation and Direction Course. On return he was made the Navigating Officer of the destroyer PNS Khyber, and later, the Navigating and Training Officer of the training cruiser Babur. After that he became a staff officer in the Training Directorate at NHQ (till 1961). In 1965 he spent two months as a naval observer in the PIA flights between Karachi and Dacca (via Colombo).

After the 1965 War Khalil joined the submarine service and went to Turkey for the basic submarine course (1966-1967). He stayed back in Turkey for extra sea-time in Turkish submarines, after which he was given command of the submarine PNS Ghazi, undergoing a refit in Turkey. He brought Ghazi back to Karachi (round the Cape of Good Hope, as the Suez Canal was closed).

On return he was sent to the UK again, to familiarize himself with the running of a submarine squadron, where he also did some sea-time in British submarines. After Ghazi he was made Director Submarines in NHQ, and he was there in that capacity in the 1971 War.

Later on he commanded the Underwater Forces (submarines and PNS Iqbal) as COMUF. He commanded the destroyer PNS Alamgir for 18 months, and then came back as COMUF. And in 1975 and 1976 he was Director of ASTT, the Tactical Teacher in the PN. He was a Captain now.

Bahrain Navy

In the mid-1970s Bahrain wanted to start a Navy, and also a Navy High Command, all from scratch. They asked the US Navy, the Royal Navy, the Egyptian Navy and the Pakistan Navy for studies on the subject. The PN nominated Captain Khalil, then Director ASTT, for this work. He went to Bahrain in 1975, carried out the study and came back. Khalil's work was accepted by the Bahrain government and they asked for his services for setting up their navy, and also to run it.

After some haggling, in which the Pakistan Ambassador in Bahrain and finally President Zia ul Haque himself had to intervene, Khalil was nominated for the job – for two years. When the two years were over the period was extended by another year; and when that time was also over the Bahrain Government asked for Khalil to be transferred to them permanently. This was difficult, but again with intervention of President Zia ul Haque and the Amir of Bahrain, Khalil's services were transferred to the Government of Bahrain.

Khalil was able to accomplish this very difficult task with the help of the Pakistan Navy, which sent a number of its officers to Bahrain on deputation to assist him. Khalil returned the favour by enrolling dozens of retired naval officers, and hundreds of retired sailors and technical civilian, for completing the mission. In recognition of his services the Bahrain government awarded Khalil their second highest award the WISAM-E-Bahrain, and various other rewards. After commanding the Bahrain Navy for about ten years (Khalil was known as 'Commander' now) he resigned in 1987on certain issues; the resignation was accepted with great sadness by the Bahrain government. On return to Pakistan he was awarded Hilal e Imtiaz on the recommendation of CNS Pakistan Navy, and the President of Pakistan made him the Guest of Honour at the Independence Day Parade in 1987.

Political Career

Khalil went back to his hometown Peshawar in 1987 and started his political career. To the surprise of many old veterans in the game he was elected Senator (1987 to 1991), with the highest number of votes.

As a junior Senator he legislated for Human Rights Committee of the Senate of Pakistan and thus changed the Rules of Business of the Senate, and he was the first Chairman of Human Rights Committee. He was elected Senator again in 2003 and was elected Deputy Chairman of Senate till 2005. In 2005 he was appointed Governor of NWFP (now KPK). He was Governor till 2006 after which he resigned on policy matters. When President General Musharraf asked him about his achievements as Governor, Khalil said that his biggest success was that there were no deaths in Kurram Agency for 2 years. In 2006 Khalil was appointed Special Assistant of Prime Minister with the status of Federal Minister. His work in this appointment is still remembered. He was also part of the caretaker government, till he retired from active politics in 2008.

He settled in Islamabad.

== See also ==
- Pakistan

Political offices
Preceded by Iftikhar Hussain Shah	Governor of Khyber-Pakhtunkhwa; 2005 – 2006	Succeeded by Ali Jan Aurakzai

Preceded by 1999 Pakistani coup d'état	Deputy Chairman of the Senate; 2003-2006	Succeeded by Jan Mohammad Jamali
