= Masood Kausar =

Pakistani politician

Barrister Masood Kausar

Governor of Khyber Pakhtunkhwa
- In office 10 February 2011 – 10 February 2013
- President: Asif Ali Zardari
- Prime Minister: Raja Parvez Ashraf
- Preceded by: Owais Ahmed Ghani
- Succeeded by: Shaukatullah Khan

Pakistan Senator from Khyber-Pakhtunkhwa Province
- In office 1994–2000
- President: Justice Rafiq Tarar
- Prime Minister: Nawaz Sharif

Deputy Leader of Opposition Provincial Assembly of Khyber-Pakhtunkhwa
- In office 1990–1993
- President: Ghulam Ishaq Khan; Wasim Sajjad
- Prime Minister: Nawaz Sharif

Speaker Provincial Assembly of Khyber-Pakhtunkhwa
- In office 1988–1990
- President: Ghulam Ishaq Khan
- Prime Minister: Benazir Bhutto
- Governor: BGen. Amir Gulistan Janjua, PA

Personal details
- Born: Kohat, NWFP, British India (now Pakistan)
- Party: Pakistan People's Party (PPP)
- Education: Peshawar University (LLB)
- Occupation: Politician; Barrister-at-law
- Profession: Barrister-at-law; Judge

Masood Kausar (Urdu: مسعود کوثر) is a Pakistani politician who was 28th Governor of Khyber Pakhtunkhwa. He held many senior government positions including; Speaker of the Assembly, Minister for Communications, Deputy Leader of Opposition in Khyber Pakhtunkhwa province and chairman of standing committee while he was Member of the Senate of Pakistan. He is one of the founding members of the Pakistan Peoples Party (PPP).

== Early life and education ==
Masood Kausar earned his Bachelor of Arts from Islamia College, Peshawar. After completing his degree, he opted for education in law and jurisprudence and got his LLB degree from the Peshawar University in 1960. He was called to the Bar in 1968 from the Honorable Society of Lincoln's Inn, England.

Kausar took keen interest in the extra-curricular activities at all the educational institutions he attended and was very popular among students and his colleagues. He has a rare distinction to his credit for having been elected as President of the Khyber Union of Islamia College Peshawar. He was the first elected General Secretary of the Peshawar University Students Union. During his stay in England, Masood Kausar was again elected as the General Secretary of the Pakistan Students' Federation Great Britain.

Masood Kausar was married with three sons. He belongs to a Pashtun family and is the brother of Urdu poet Ahmad Faraz. His nephew Shibli Faraz was house leader in the Senate of Pakistan.

== Professional career ==
Masood Kausar has appeared before the High Courts and the Supreme Court of Pakistan in various cases. He was elected President of the Peshawar High Court Bar Association in 1984 and has also been an honorary visiting professor of law at the University Law College Peshawar.

== Political career ==
Returning from United Kingdom in the 1970s, Barrister Masood Kausar joined (PPP). He held various positions in the party and eventually succeeded Aftab Ahmad Khan Sherpao to become the Provincial President of PPP in Khyber Pakhtunkhwa. Under Masood Kausar, the PPP grow from strength to strength and became very effective in the province. He initiated and oversaw party reorganisation in all towns and districts.

Barrister Masood Kausar served as Speaker of the provincial assembly of Khyber-Pakhtunkhwa from 1988 to 1990. After getting re-elected in 1990, he was elected Deputy Leader of Opposition from 1990 to 1993. In 1994 he was elected as a member of the Senate of Pakistan in 1994 for six years term.

A close associate of Benazir Bhutto, Asif Ali Zardari, Bilawal Bhutto and member of PPP "Think Tank" committee and Central Executive Committee.

== Sources ==
- http://thepost.com.pk/Ba_ShortNews.aspx?fbshortid=2843&bcatid=14&bstatus=Current&fcatid=14&fstatus=Current
- https://web.archive.org/web/20071209095132/http://www.senate.gov.pk/ShowMemberDetail.asp?MemberCode=470&CatCode=0&CatName=
- https://web.archive.org/web/20071219220238/http://www.pap.gov.pk/pro-ass/nwfp.htm
- https://web.archive.org/web/20060927155932/http://www.khyber.org/people/pol/AftabAhmadKhanSherpao.shtml
- http://www.lib.virginia.edu/area-studies/SouthAsia/SAserials/Dawn/1998/14Feb98.html
- http://www.khyberpakhtunkhwa.gov.pk/
