= Zaid Hamid =

Pakistani political commentator and conspiracy-theorist (born 1964)

- Born: Syed Zaid Zaman Hamid; 14 March 1964 (age 62); Karachi, Sindh, Pakistan
- Occupations: Political commentator, security consultant
- Organization: Brass Tacks

YouTube information
- Channel: Zaid Zaman Hamid Official
- Years active: 2011–present
- Subscribers: 61.9 thousand
- Views: 2.94 million
- Last updated: 23 March 2026
- Website: www.zaidhamid.pk

Syed Zaid Zaman Hamid (Urdu: سید زید زمان حامد, born 14 March 1964) is a Pakistani Islamist political commentator and conspiracy theorist.

Born to a Pakistan Army officer and a Kashmiri mother, Zaid is considered a supporter of jihad and Kashmir-centric anti-India organizations. He claims to have fought in the Soviet-Afghan War. He has been accused of being a supporter of Pakistan Army interventions in matters of state and actively campaigns against democracy in Pakistan. Zaid supports an Islamic system of government.

In 2019, The Muslim 500 included him in their yearly list of most influential Muslims in the world, as a political commentator and host of the Brass Tacks TV series on geo-politics, Islamic philosophy, Muslim history, and Dr. Muhammad Iqbal’s vision for Pakistan.

Historian Manan Ahmed Asif called him the leading voice of a new Pakistani revivalism, because according to Asif, Zaid radicalizes young, urban men and women under the age of 30 — the largest demographics of Pakistan — into a mixture of militant Pakistani nationalism and Islamism.

== Early life and education ==
Hamid was born on March 14, 1964, in Karachi, Sindh, Pakistan to a Bihari Muhajir father and a Kashmiri Muslim mother. His father was a Pakistan Army officer. He studied computer systems at the NED University of Engineering & Technology in Karachi. He is the second of four siblings. His father fought in the Indo-Pakistani Wars of 1965 and 1971.

== Political views and conspiracy theories ==
Hamid's views on politics and security have been widely criticized for promoting conspiracy theories, xenophobia and hate speech towards Hindus and Jews. He has also been linked to Yusuf Ali who was sentenced to death for blasphemy for claiming prophethood. Hamid has distanced himself from these claims.

In 2013, Imaad Khalid, a former staff member of Zaid Hamid, alleged at a press conference, that Zaid Hamid was plotting to assassinate pro-democracy army chief, Ashfaq Pervaiz Kayani. He showed to the media the emails that he claims were sent by Zaid Hamid to different army officers asking to revolt against their own chief. He said "Zaid Hamid is a quisling and enemy of Islam and Pakistan, who had plotted unsuccessfully to assassinate the pro-democracy army chief Gen Kayani." Khalid further claimed that Zaid's hit list also contained the names of Chief Justice Iftikhar Muhammad Chaudhry, Prime Minister Nawaz Sharif, and others from the media and the judiciary.

Hamid believes that Islamic-prophet Muhammad had declared war on India, a claim with no reference in Islam, and that India will be "trounced and enslaved according to Sharia if Hindus don’t repent and embrace Islam."

Hamid claims that the 2008 Mumbai attacks in India by the Lashkar-e-Taiba, were actually part of a plan hatched by "Hindu Zionists", and that it was an attempt by the Indians to stage a false flag attack, which he also accuses the 9/11 attacks of being.

On May 27, 2011, he claimed on the News One TV channel that Ajmal Kasab's, the only 26/11 perpetrator arrested alive, was actually Amar Singh and a Sikh and a Research and Analysis Wing agent. He also called him a Bharatiya Janata Party terrorist.

In May 2020, Zaid Hamid said that the COVID-19 vaccine will rid the Muslims of Islamic spirit and that COVID is less dangerous than flu. Adding that Bill Gates wanted to kill the people of the region.

=== Arrest in Saudi Arabia (2015) ===
In June 2015, Hamid was arrested in Saudi Arabia for opposing the Saudi-led intervention in the Yemeni civil war. He was visiting the Kingdom on a private tour with family when he was arrested. On July 1, 2015, media sources began citing unconfirmed reports that Hamid had been sentenced to 8 years in prison, and 1,000 or 1,200 lashes, for criticizing the Saudi government. Media reports later claimed these reports about the sentence could not be verified. The Pakistan embassy officially requested consular access and information about the charges against Hamid. He was released in early October 2015 due to lack of evidence and baseless allegation of spying for Iran. Hamid alleges that the allegation of spying was hatched by India's spy agency Research and Analysis Wing (R&AW).

During an interview in 2020, Hamid claimed that then Pakistan Army chief General Raheel Sharif and DG ISI Lt. General Rizwan Akhtar had played an instrumental role in securing his release.

== Books ==
His books include:

=== Urdu ===
- Pākistān : ek ʻishq, ek junūn. Booklet describing account of freedom struggle for Pakistan.
- Islām kā siyāsī taṣavvur : Pākistān men̲ maz̲habī o firqahvārānah tashaddud. Booklet on political thoughts in Islam, includes a brief history of sectarian violence in Pakistan from 1979 to 1996.
- Dahshat gardī ke k̲h̲ilāf Amrīkī jang. Critical study of war on terror.
- Hindū ṣaihūnīyat. Critical study of Pak-India relations from ancient times to 21st century.
- Yahūdī aur ʻĪsāʼī Ṣaihūnīyat. Booklet on alleged Jewish and Christian conspiracies against Muslims.
- Maujūdah Pāk Afghān taʻalluqāt, ek tārīk̲h̲ almīyah. Historical study of Pakistan and Afghanistan relations; critical review.
- Iqbal Purisrar. On the life and thought of Muhammad Iqbal.
- Halqa-E-Yaran. A novel concerning matters of spirituality, in the spirit of Ashfaq Ahmed.
- Khilafat-e-Rashida. On the Rashidun caliphs, their system of governance and justice.

=== English ===
- Mumbai : dance of the devil : Hindu Zionists, Mumbai attacks, and the Indian dossier against Pakistan
- From Indus to Oxus : memoirs. Memoirs of author highlighting his role in Soviet-Afghan war, 1979–1989; includes his visits and meeting with Afghan leaders in Afghanistan during 1986–1992. Later translated into Urdu by himself as Daryā e Sindh sai daryā e Āmū tak : yād'dāshtīn̲.
