= Rupert Hay =

British Indian Army officer and administrator

Sir Rupert Hay
- Born: 16 December 1893
- Died: 3 April 1962 (aged 68)

Sir William Rupert Hay KCMG KCIE CSI (16 December 1893 – 3 April 1962) was a British Indian Army officer and administrator in British India. He served as Chief Commissioner of Balochistan during the colonial era.

== Career ==
Hay was educated at Bradfield and University College, Oxford. He was commissioned in the Dorsetshire Regiment in 1914 and served during World War I in Mesopotamia. He transferred to the Indian Army and was attached to the 24th Punjabis, being appointed Quarter-Master 30 October 1916. He was promoted to Lieutenant in 1918. He was seconded to the Foreign and Political Department in May 1920 and was confirmed in his appointment in May 1924. He was Political Agent in South Waziristan 1924–28, Assistant Commissioner in Mardan 1928–31, and Political Agent in Malakand 1931–33. He was Resident in Waziristan 1940–41, Resident in the Persian Gulf 1941–42, Revenue and Judicial Commissioner in Balochistan 1942–43 and Agent to the Governor-General, Resident and Chief Commissioner in Balochistan 1943–46. He was again Political Resident in the Persian Gulf from 1946 to 1953 when he retired from the service and returned to England.

== Publications ==
- Two Years in Kurdistan : Experiences of a Political Officer, 1918-1920, Sidgwick & Jackson, London, 1921
- The Persian Gulf States, Middle East Institute, Washington D.C., 1959. ISBN 0404189660

Government offices
Preceded by Sir Aubrey Metcalfe	Chief Commissioner of Balochistan; 1943–1946	Succeeded by Henry Poulton
