= Fida Mohammad Khan =

Pakistani conservative economist and lawyer

16th Governor of North-West Frontier Province
- In office 27 August 1986 – 16 June 1988
- President: Muhammad Zia-ul-Haq
- Preceded by: Syed Usman Ali Shah
- Succeeded by: Amir Gulistan Janjua

Personal details
- Born: Mufti Fida Mohammad Khan; 24 November 1919 Peshawar, North-West Frontier Province, British India
- Died: 20 December 2007 (aged 88) Peshawar, Khyber Pakhtunkhwa, Pakistan
- Citizenship: British Subject (1919–1947); Pakistan (1947–2007)
- Party: PML(N) (1993–2007)
- Other political affiliations: AIML (1939–1947); PML (1947–1958); PML(C) (1962–1972); PML(F) (1973–1988)
- Education: Edwardes College (BA); Aligarh Muslim University (LLB)

Fida Mohammad Khan (Urdu: مفتی فدا محمد خان 24 November 1919 – 20 December 2007) was a Pakistani conservative economist and lawyer who served as the Governor of the Khyber-Pakhtunkhwa Province under the military government of General Muhammad Zia-ul-Haq from 1986 until 1988. He was one of the founding members of the All-India Muslim League's North-West Frontier Province chapter before 1947.

== Early life and career ==
Born in 1919, Fida Khan was educated at the Peshawar University, graduated and earned his BA degree in economics from the Edwardes College, and LLB degree in economic law from Aligarh Muslim University in 1945. During this time, Fida Khan joined All-India Muslim League and actively participated in Pakistan Movement, serving as the leading activist of Pakistan Movement in Khyber-Pakhtunkhwa. Fida Muhammad Khan was a veteran Muslim Leaguer and former Governor of NWFP. He had also served as an ex-senator, federal minister, provincial minister and a member of the National Assembly of Pakistan (MNA). He had represented Pakistan in the United Nations also at an early age of 27. As a young man, Fida Mohammad Khan took part in the independence movement. As All-India Muslim League - Peshawar chapter president, he played an active role in the 1947 referendum in the NWFP in which majority of voters opted for their province to become part of Pakistan. The referendum was rejected and boycotted by the Pashtun nationalists led by Khan Abdul Gaffar Khan.

He also remained active in the All-India Muslim League's National Guards and Muslim Students Federation. He subsequently served as central and provincial president of the Muslim League. Twice during his political career, Fida Mohammad Khan was elected member of the Senate. However, he never contested an assembly election. During General Ziaul Haq's martial law regime, he served as federal housing minister. He remained governor of the NWFP from 1986 to 1988.

Fida Mohammad was fond of narrating the story of Quaid-i-Azam Mohammad Ali Jinnah's visit to Khyber Agency. Due to opposition by the Congress party of India and its ally, Khudai Khidmatgar movement, Jinnah's trip to Khyber Agency was considered risky. But Fida Mohammad Khan volunteered to drive Jinnah to Landikotal, where his father Tehmas Khan was serving as political Tehsildar.

This is regarded as a historic trip, as tribesmen welcomed the Quaid-i-Azam, and announced their allegiance to the All-India Muslim League. Quaid-i-Azam was driven to Torkham on the border with Afghanistan, and brought back by Fida Mohammad Khan to Peshawar. For the young Fida, this was a memorable event and he never missed an opportunity to narrate the story.

The PML under Mohammad Khan Junejo formed the government in the so-called 'non-party' elections of March 1985, but the President, General Zia ul Haq dismissed it on 29 May 1988 on account of challenges to Zia's power. Following this, Fida Khan lead a break-away faction of the PML, the so-called PML-F, which remained loyal to Zia. After Gen. Zia's death in a mysterious Pakistan Air Force crash in August 1988 the Supreme Court of Pakistan mandated free and fair multi-party general elections to be held in November 1988. The PML-F, under pressure from Inter-Services Intelligence Director-General Hamid Gul merged with the Jamaati Islami and a few smaller parties to form the 'Islami Jamhoori Ittihad.' The IJI under Fida Khan failed to achieve a majority in the National Assembly, but found victory in the Punjab Provincial Assembly under Nawaz Sharif. As a result, Sharif soon eclipsed Khan as leader of the IJI, and its main successor, the PML-N.

== Pakistan Football Federation ==
Fida served as president of the Pakistan Football Federation between 1978 and 1981.

== Death, awards and recognition ==
- Nishan-e-Imtiaz Award by the Government of Pakistan for his services
- Fida Mohammad Khan died on 20 December 2007 in Peshawar after a protracted illness at age 88.

Political offices
Preceded by Syed Usman Ali Shah	Governor of Khyber Pakhtunkhwa; 1987–1988	Succeeded by Amir Gulistan Janjua
