= Pakistan Land Port Authority =

Government agency of Pakistan

Agency overview
- Jurisdiction: Pakistan
- Agency executive: Chairman of the authority, Head of PLPA Gen. (Retd) Hassan Azhar Hayat

The Pakistan Land Port Authority (PLPA) is a government-backed Authority that seeks to enhance trade operations at border regions, benefiting the business community, including exporters and importers. With assistance from the Asian Development Bank (ADB), the initiative aims to modernize Pakistan's external border, fostering legitimate trade and improving bilateral and transit trade with Afghanistan and Central Asian Republics (CARs). The ultimate goal is to deter illegal trade and facilitate smoother cross-border transactions.

== History ==
In December 2012, former Prime Minister Raja Pervez Ashraf granted preliminary approval for the establishment of the authority, aiming to streamline the movement of goods, vehicles, and passenger traffic across borders with neighboring countries. The project is aligning with the three-year strategic trade policy framework devised by the Ministry of Commerce. The primary functions of the PLPA were to develop policies and act as a coordinating entity for various government agencies involved in cross-border trade facilitation.

On 7 August 2025, the National Assembly of Pakistan passed the Pakistan Land Port Authority Bill 2025. On 19 August 2025, the Senate of Pakistan also passed the bill.

On 30 August 2025, President Asif Ali Zardari gave his assent to the Pakistan Land Port Authority Bill, 2025, making it into law and forming the way for the establishment of the authority.
