= Geoffrey Prior =

British politician (1896–1972)

Sir Geoffrey Prior
- Born: 9 December 1896; India
- Died: 11 October 1972; South Africa

Sir Charles Geoffrey Prior, KCIE, FRGS (9 December 1896 – 11 October 1972) was a British Indian Army and Indian Political Service officer.

The only son of Richard Delabere Prior, the young Prior was educated at Shrewsbury School and then trained at the Royal Military College, Sandhurst, from where he was commissioned into the Indian Army on 14 July 1915. In August 1923, he joined the political service department, in which he rose to be under-secretary. He was appointed a Commander of the Order of the Indian Empire in 1936 and in 1943 was made a knight commander of the same Order. Between 1939 and 1946 he was British Resident in the Persian Gulf. By the time of the British withdrawal from India in August 1947, Prior held the rank of Lieutenant Colonel.

Political offices
Preceded by Henry Mortimer Poulton	Chief Commissioner of Balochistan; 1946–1947	Succeeded by Abolished
