= Chiliss =

The Chiliss (sometimes spelled Chilis or Chiliṣ) were a small, historically significant ethnic group traditionally associated with the Indus Valley in the Hindu Kush region of what is now Khyber Pakhtunkhwa, Pakistan. According to their own oral tradition, the Chiliss originally migrated from Buner (historically “Boneyr”), a mountainous district to the west, before settling in the Indus Valley.

Colonial-era ethnographic research, particularly by John Biddulph in his seminal work Tribes of the Hindoo Koosh, suggested that the Chiliss may have been culturally and linguistically related to the Torwali people of Swat Kohistan (Behrain Tehsil). Over time, the Chiliss appear to have lost much of their distinct identity. According to Biddulph, by the late 19th century their numbers had dwindled, and they had largely assimilated into surrounding communities.

Linguistically the Chiliss speak a dialect closely related to Torwali, underscoring their common origin.

== History ==
The Chiliss are first documented in the late 19th century, notably by Colonel John Biddulph in his book Tribes of the Hindoo Koosh (1880). In his account, Biddulph describes a small community of about 200 families living in scattered villages in the upper Indus or Hindu Kush region. According to Biddulph, neighboring groups referred to them as “Chiliss,” but internally they may have used a different name. He reported that their own tradition held they originally migrated from Buner (Boneyr).

Biddulph also recounts a tale of conflict tied to their history: the Chiliss allegedly engaged in a battle with a neighboring community, staking their freedom in the fight; if defeated, they would convert to Islam. According to his narrative, after their defeat some Chiliss clung to their old faith and relocated to a valley along the Indus, though he notes that later many were nonetheless forced to convert. By Biddulph’s time, the Chiliss no longer formed a strongly separate political or tribal entity. He writes that, having been absorbed into other groups, they lost much of their earlier distinctiveness.

Calvin R. Rensch provides linguistic evidence relevant to their history. He connects the Chiliss to the language ecology of Kohistan and upper Swat, suggesting that their speech may have been related to the Torwali language. Rensch’s work implies that, whatever their earlier identity, the Chiliss may have culturally and linguistically merged with nearby Dardic-speaking communities, contributing to their disappearance as a distinct group.

== See also ==
- Torwali people
- Swat Kohistan
- Dardic peoples
- Buner District
- John Biddulph
