= 1913 Birthday Honours =

National awards given by King George V

The 1913 Birthday Honours were appointments in the British Empire of King George V to various orders and honours to reward and highlight good works by citizens. The appointments were made to celebrate the official birthday of The King, and were published on 3 June 1913 and 6 June 1913.

The recipients of honours are displayed here as they were styled before their new honour, and arranged by honour, with classes (Knight, Knight Grand Cross, etc.) and then divisions (Military, Civil, etc.) as appropriate.

== British Empire ==
=== The Most Honourable Order of the Bath ===
==== Knight Grand Cross of the Order of the Bath (GCB) ====
Military Division

- Admiral Sir Reginald Neville Custance, KCB, KCMG, CVO
- Admiral Sir John Durnford, KCB, DSO
- Admiral the Honourable Sir Hedworth Meux, KCB, KCVO
- General Sir Horace Lockwood Smith-Dorrien, KCB, DSO, AdC General, Colonel, The Sherwood Foresters (Nottinghamshire and Derbyshire Regiment), General Officer Commanding-in-Chief, Southern Command.
- General the Right Honourable Sir Arthur Henry Fitzroy Paget, KCB, KCVO, AdC General, General Officer Commanding-in-Chief the Forces in Ireland.
- General Sir Josceline Heneage Wodehouse, KCB, CMG, Colonel Commandant, Royal Artillery.

==== Knight Commander of the Order of the Bath (KCB) ====
Military Division

- Vice-Admiral Robert Lowry
- Vice-Admiral Charles Briggs
- Vice-Admiral Cecil Burney
- Rear-Admiral (Acting Vice-Admiral) Sir George Warrender, Bart., KCVO, CB
- Rear-Admiral Doveton Sturdee, CVO, CMG
- Colonel 2nd Commandant George Grey Aston, CB, AdC, RMA
- Lieutenant-General Douglas Cochrane, Earl of Dundonald, KCVO, CB, Colonel, 2nd Life Guards.
- General Sir Donald James Sim McLeod, KCIE, CB, DSO, Indian Army, Colonel, 28th Light Cavalry.
- Major-General Francis John William Eustace, CB (retired).
- Lieutenant-General Sir Douglas Haig, KCIE, KCVO, CB, Colonel, 17th (Duke of Cambridge's Own) Lancers, General Officer Commanding-in-Chief, Aldershot Command.
- Major-General William Dillon Otter, CVO, CB, Inspector-General and Chief Military Adviser to the Minister of Militia, Dominion of Canada.
- Lieutenant-General Henry Sclater, CB
- Lieutenant-General Sir Robert Scallon, KCIE, CB, DSO, AdC General, Indian Army, Commanding Burma Division.
- Surgeon-General Henry Hamilton, CB, MD, Indian Medical Service (retired).
- Colonel and Honorary Major-General Luke O'Connor, VC, CB (retired).
- Major-General John Cowans, CB, MVO, Quartermaster-General to the Forces, Third Military Member, Army Council.

Civil Division

- Lieutenant-Colonel and Honorary Charles Elton Longmore, CB, VD, late Commanding 1st Battalion, The Hertfordshire Regiment, Territorial Force.
- Lieutenant-Colonel the Right Honourable Sir William Carington, GCVO, CB, Keeper of His Majesty's Privy Purse and Extra Equerry.
- John Bradbury, Esq., CB, Member of the National Health Insurance Commission, England, and of the National Health Insurance Joint Committee.
- Alfred Eyles, Esq., CB, Accountant-General of the Navy.
- Charles Harris, Esq., CB, Assistant Financial Secretary, War Office.
- Sir Nathaniel Highmore, CB, late Solicitor to the Board of Customs and Excise.

==== Companion of the Order of the Bath (CB) ====
Military Division

- Captain Price Vaughan Lewes, DSO, RN
- Major Lewis Stratford Tollemache Halliday, VC, RMLI
- Surgeon-General Louis Edward Anderson, Deputy Director of Medical Services, Ireland.
- Colonel (temporary Brigadier-General) Stuart Peter Rolt, Brigade Commander, 14th Infantry Brigade, Irish Command.
- Colonel (temporary Brigadier-General) William Eliot Peyton, CVO, DSO, Military Secretary to the Commander-in-Chief, East Indies.
- Colonel Edmond Guy Tulloch Bainbridge, General Staff Officer, 1st Grade, Western Command.
- Colonel John Emerson Wharton Headlam, DSO, half-pay.
- Colonel George Francis Leverson, half-pay.
- Colonel (temporary Brigadier-General) William Hugh Eric Murray, Commanding Pretoria District, South Africa.
- Colonel Hubert John Du Cane, MVO, Assistant Quartermaster-General, Aldershot Command.
- Colonel Guy Percy Wyndham, MVO, half-pay.
- Colonel (temporary Brigadier-General) Edmund Gustavus Nicolls, Inspector of Royal Garrison Artillery.
- Colonel (temporary Brigadier-General) Spring Robert Rice, Chief Engineer, Aldershot Command.
- Colonel (local and temporary Major-General) Stanley Brenton von Donop, Master-General of the Ordnance, Fourth Military Member, Army Council.
- Lieutenant-Colonel and Brevet Colonel Charles Herbert Philip Carter, CMG, Commanding 2nd Battalion, The Cameronians (Scottish Rifles).
- Colonel (temporary Brigadier-General) Frederick Archibald Adam, Brigade Commander, Malta.
- Colonel Frederic Charles Shaw, General Staff Officer, 1st Grade, Scottish Command.
- Colonel James Bales Gaunter, Assistant Adjutant-General, War Office.
- Colonel Edward Stanislaus Bulfin, CVO, Brigade Commander, Essex Infantry Brigade, Eastern Command.
- Colonel John Gunning Hunter, Indian Army.
- Colonel Percy Holland, Indian Army.
- Colonel (temporary Brigadier-General) Gerard Robert Clark Paul, CMG, AdC, Inspector of the Army Service Corps, War Office.
- Colonel Arthur Robert Dick, Indian Army, Inspecting Officer, Frontier Corps, India.
- Colonel Robert Henry Twigg, Indian Army.

Civil Division

- Rear-Admiral Frederick Charles Tudor Tudor.
- Deputy Surgeon-General William Maxwell Craig, MB
- Captain George Alexander Ballard, AdC, RN
- Rear-Admiral Mark Edward Frederic Kerr, MVO
- Captain Henry Francis Oliver, MVO, AdC, RN
- Engineer Rear-Admiral George Goodwin Goodwin
- Colonel George Ranier Crawford, Indian Army.
- Colonel (temporary Brigadier-General) Arthur Blount Cuthbert Williams, Indian Army, Director of Supplies and Transport, India.
- Lieutenant-Colonel John Crimmin, VC, CIE, Indian Medical Service, Presidency Surgeon, Bombay.
- Colonel Sir Hilaro William Wellesley Barlow, Bart., Superintendent of the Royal Laboratory, Woolwich.
- Mervyn O'Gorman, Esq., Superintendent of the Royal Aircraft Factory.
- Colonel Thomas Joseph Kearns, Commanding 1st London Divisional Transport and Supply Column, Army Service Corps, Territorial Force.
- Beilby Francis Alston, Esq., Senior Clerk, Foreign Office.
- Henry Noel Bunbury, Esq., Accountant and Comptroller-General, National Health Insurance Commission, England.
- James Patrick Byrne, Esq., ISO, Secretary to the Board of Customs and Excise.
- Frank Harry Dale, Esq., Chief Inspector for Elementary Schools, Board of Education.
- Henry Davies, Esq., ISO, Comptroller, Savings Bank Department, General Port Office.
- Richard Humphrey Davies, Esq., Private Secretary to the Patronage Secretary, Treasury.
- Major Adrian Grant-Duff, Assistant Secretary, Committee of Imperial Defence.
- Francis Nugent Greer, Esq., Parliamentary Draughtsman, Irish Office.
- Thomas Hudson Middleton, Esq., Assistant Secretary, Board of Agriculture and Fisheries.
- John Pedder, Esq., Principal Clerk, Home Office.

=== Order of the Star of India ===
==== Knight Commander (KCSI) ====
- Michael Francis O'Dwyer, Esq., CSI, Indian Civil Service, Lieutenant-Governor of the Punjab.
- Lieutenant-Colonel Sir George Olaf Roos-Keppel, KCIE, Chief Commissioner and Agent to the Governor-General of India, North-West Frontier Province.

==== Companion (CSI) ====
- Lieutenant-Colonel Gerard Godfrey Giffard, MRCP, MRCS, Indian Medical Service, Superintendent, Government Maternity Hospital, Madras.
- Frederick William Johnston, Esq., CIE, Indian Civil Service, Deputy Secretary in the Finance Department of the Government of India.
- William Henry Lucas, Esq., Indian Civil Service, Commissioner in Sind. Bombay.
- Vakhatsinghji Kesrisinghji, Thakor Sateb of Sayla, 3rd Class Chief, Kathiawar.
- Arthur Leslie Saunders, Esq., Indian Civil Service, Commissioner of Meerut, United Provinces of Agra and Oudh, and an Additional Member of the Council of the Governor-General of India for making Laws and Regulations.

=== Order of Saint Michael and Saint George ===
==== Knight Grand Cross of the Order of St Michael and St George (GCMG) ====
- Sir Gerald Strickland, Count della Catena, KCMG, Governor of the State of New South Wales.
- His Excellency the Right Honourable Sir George William Buchanan, GCVO, KCMG, CB, His Majesty's Ambassador Extraordinary and Plenipotentiary to His Majesty the Emperor of Russia.

==== Knight Commander of the Order of St Michael and St George (KCMG) ====
- Major John Robert Chancellor, RE, CMG, DSO, Governor and Commander-in-Chief of the Colony of Mauritius.
- The Honourable Sir William Henry Solomon, Kt., Ordinary Judge of Appeal in the Appellate Division of the Supreme Court of South Africa; in recognition of services as a Member of the Delimitation Commissions under the South Africa Act, 1909.
- The Honourable Sir Lomer Gouin, Kt., Premier and Attorney-General of the Province of Quebec.
- Major Sir Thomas Bilbe Robinson, Kt., Agent-General in London for the State of Queensland.
- The Honourable Sir John Winthrop Hackett, Kt., LL.D., Member of the Legislative Council of the State of Western Australia.
- Charles Thomas Cox, Esq., CMG, Government Secretary of the Colony of British Guiana.
- John Francis Charles, Count de Salis, CVO, CMG, His Majesty's Envoy Extraordinary and Minister Plenipotentiary to His Majesty the King of Montenegro.
- Brevet Colonel Lord Edward Herbert Cecil, DSO, Financial Adviser to the Egyptian Government.
- Ismail Sirry Pasha, Minister of Public Works, Egypt. (Honorary)

==== Companion of the Order of St Michael and St George (CMG) ====
- Leonard William Booth, Esq., Acting Colonial Secretary of the Island of Ceylon.
- James George Aylwin Creighton, Esq., KC, Law Clerk of the Senate, Parliamentary Counsel, and Master in Chancery, Dominion of Canada.
- Captain Francis Fitzgerald Haworth-Booth, RN, Naval Adviser to the High Commissioner for the Commonwealth of Australia.
- Alexander Lang, Esq., formerly Manager in London of the Bank of Montreal; one of the Canadian Representatives on the Pacific Cable Board.
- Colonel David Miller, ISO, Secretary to the Department of Home Affairs, Commonwealth of Australia.
- John Rumney Nicholson Esq., Chairman and Chief Engineer, Tanjong Pagar Dock Board, Singapore, Straits Settlements.
- Henry Otterson, Esq., Clerk of the House of Representatives of the Dominion of New Zealand.
- Commander Samuel Augustus Pethebridge, RANR (retired), Secretary to the Department of Defence, Commonwealth of Australia.
- Herbert James Stanley, Esq., Private Secretary to His Excellency the Governor-General and Commander-in-Chief of the Union of South Africa.
- Colonel Edward Peter Strickland, DSO, Commandant in Northern Nigeria, West African Frontier Force.
- Colonel George Handcock Thesiger, lately Inspector-General of the King's African Rifles.
- Salvatore Cachia Zammit, Esq., formerly Unofficial Member of the Executive Council and Elected Member of the Council of Government of the Island of Malta.
- Sidney Barton, Esq., Chinese Secretary to His Majesty's Legation at Peking.
- Engineer Commander Edmund Edward Bond, RN (retired), DSO (Major-General in the Egyptian Army), Director of the Soudan Steamers Department.
- Hamilton Edward Browne, Esq., British Commissioner on the European Commission for the Navigation of the Danube.
- Lieutenant-Colonel James Archibald Douglas, Commandant, 39th King George's Own Central India Horse; for services in Persia.
- Captain Henry Charles Barwick Hopkinson (Major-General in the Egyptian Army), Head of the Police at Alexandria.
- Henry Pottinger Keatinge, Esq., MB, Director, Egyptian Kasr-el-Ainy Government Hospital and Medical School.
- William Pollock Ker, Esq., Commercial Attaché to His Majesty's Legation at Peking.
- Raymond de Burgh Money Layard, Esq., His Majesty's Consul-General at Kobe.
- Major Louis Lort Rhys Samson, His Majesty's Consul at Adrianople.
- Alfred Henry Spurrier, Esq., late Medical Officer of Health at Zanzibar.

=== Order of the Indian Empire ===
==== Companion (CIE) ====
- Major George Kemp Walker, Indian Civil Veterinary Department, Professor of Sanitary Science, Punjab Veterinary College, Punjab.
- Sardar Arur Singh, Sardar Bahadur, Honorary Magistrate and Manager, Darbar Sahib, Amritsar, Punjab.
- Lieutenant-Colonel Victor North Hickley, VD, Commandant, Bihar Light Horse.
- Rai Bahadur Sheo Shankar Sahay, Member of the Council of the Lieutenant-Governor of Bihar and Orissa for making Laws and Regulations.
- Joseph Henry Stone, Esq., MA, Special Deputy Director of Public Instruction, Madras.
- Major George Standish Gage Craufurd, DSO, Intelligence Officer, Persian Gulf.
- Major Henry Beauchamp St. John, Assistant Secretary in the Foreign Department of the Government of India.
- Sardar Appaji Rao Shitole Ankkar, Lieutenant-Colonel in the Gwalior State Troops, Chief Secretary to His Highness the Maharaja of Gwalior, and Member of the State Council of Gwalior.
- Alexander Phillips Muddiman, Esq., Indian Civil Service, Deputy Secretary in the Legislative Department of the Government of India.
- Henry Fraser Howard, Esq., Indian Civil Service, Collector of Customs, Calcutta.
- Lawrence Mercer, Esq., President of the Forest Research Institute and College, Dehra Dun, United Provinces of Agra and Oudh.
- Captain William Lachlan Campbell, Assistant Secretary to the Chief Commissioner, North-West Frontier Province.
- William Charles Michael Dundas, Esq., Superintendent of Police, Assam.
- Bhupendra Nath Mitra, Esq., MA, Assistant Secretary in the Finance Department of the Government of India.
- John Henry Lace, Esq., Chief Conservator of Forests, Burma.
- Patrick Robert Cadell, Esq., Indian Civil Service, Municipal Commissioner for the City of Bombay.
- Charles Cunningham Watson, Esq., Indian Civil Service, Secretary, Political Department, Bombay.
- Hugh Lansdown Stephenson, Esq., Indian Civil Service, Secretary to the Government of Bengal, Financial and Municipal Departments, and an Additional Member of the Council of the Governor of Bengal for making Laws and Regulations.
- Babu Abanindra Nath Tagore, Officiating Principal, Government School of Art, Calcutta.
- William Henry Heton Arden-Wood, Esq., Principal of the La Martiniere College, Calcutta.
- James Rae Pearson, Esq., Indian Civil Service, Collector of Meerut, United Provinces of Agra and Oudh.
- Major Robert James Blackham, Royal Army Medical Corps, Commanding the State Hospital, Jutogh.
- William Caldwell Ashmore, Esq., Deputy Secretary to the Government of India, Military Finance Department.

=== Royal Victorian Order ===
==== Knight Grand Cross of the Royal Victorian Order (GCVO) ====
- His Highness the Sultan of Perak, GCMG

==== Knight Commander of the Royal Victorian Order (KCVO) ====
- The Hon. Richard Charles Moreton, CVO
- Sir Edward John Poynter, Bart., PRA

==== Commander of the Royal Victorian Order (CVO) ====
- John Murray, Esq.

==== Member of the Royal Victorian Order, 4th class (MVO) ====
- Major the Hon. George Arthur Charles Crichton
- Lieutenant-Colonel the Hon. Francis Lionel Colborne.
- John Henry Frederick Bacon, Esq., ARA
- The Rev. John Henry Joshua Ellison.

==== Member of the Royal Victorian Order, 5th class (MVO) ====
- E. Chart, Esq.

=== Companions of the Imperial Service Order (ISO) ===
Home Civil Service

- William Henry Bray, Esq., Staff Clerk and Acting Head of Section, Board of Education.
- William Patrick Joseph Connolly, Esq., Principal Clerk, Chief Secretary's Office, Dublin Castle.
- William Henry Godfrey Deacon, Esq., Superintendent of Mercantile Marine, Board of Trade.
- Alfred James Hiscock, Esq., Superintendent the Registry, Treasury.
- Alfred James Mundy, Esq., Superintendent Accounts, Registrar-General's Department
- Samuel Renard, Esq., Principal Clerk, Supreme Court Pay Office.
- John Skinner, Esq., General Inspector of Sea Fisheries, Fishery Board for Scotland.
- Henry Turing, Esq., His Majesty's Consul, Rotterdam.
- Herbert Maxwell Warne, Esq., First Class Clerk, Department of the Solicitor to the Treasury and King's Proctor.

COLONIAL CIVIL SERVICE.

- James Frank Andrews, Esq., Clerk of the Executive Council and Secretary to the Cabinet, Dominion of New Zealand.
- William Bathfield, Esq., Chief Clerk in the Master's Office, Supreme Court, and Acting Accountant in Bankruptcy, Colony of Mauritius.
- William Bazett Goodwin Blenkins, Esq., lately Resident Magistrate, King William's Town, Union of South Africa.
- William Cochrane Bowles, Esq., Chief Clerk of English Votes and Proceedings, House of Commons of Canada.
- Maurice William Holtze, Esq., Director of the Botanic Garden, Adelaide, State of South Australia.
- Walter Colin Liddell, Esq., Surveyor-General of Jamaica.
- William Joseph Lynch, Esq., Chief of the Patent Office, Department of Agriculture, Dominion of Canada.
- Captain Archibald Roger, District Magistrate, Island of St. Christopher, Colony of the Leeward Islands.
- Charles Robert Scrivener, Esq., Director of Commonwealth Lands and Surveys, Commonwealth of Australia.

INDIAN CIVIL SERVICE.

- William Hawkins, Esq., Registrar, Education Department, Punjab.
- M. R. Ry. Rao Bahadur Annu Chidambara Pranathar-Thihara Aiyar Avergal, BA, Inspector of Schools, Madras.
- Thomas Fisher, Esq., Superintendent, Government Press, Madras.
- Khan Bahadur Kutub-ud-din, Superintendent of the Nandgaon State, Central Provinces.
- John Dufour Shapcott, Esq., Registrar, Revenue and Agricultural Department of the Government of India.
- Maung Pe (2), KSM, Judicial Extra Assistant Commissioner and Additional Judge of the Court of Small Causes, Rangoon, Burma.
- Charles Patrick O'Rielly, Esq., Indian Telegraph Department, Deputy Superintendent and Honorary Assistant Superintendent, Allahabad, United Provinces.
- Rao Bahadur Ramchandra Narayan Joglekar, Deputy Collector and Native Assistant to Commissioner, Central Division, Bombay.
- Bertram Lemoine Allard Laville, Esq., Superintendent in the Finance Department of the Government of India.
- Babu Khagendra Nath Mitter, Deputy Magistrate and Deputy Collector, Hooghly, Bengal.
- George Hamilton Maflin, Esq., Chief Inspector, Customs, Preventive Service, Calcutta, Bengal.
- Munchersaw Framji Oonvala, Esq., Registrar, Financial Department, Government of Bengal.

=== Imperial Service Medal (ISM) ===
- Doorga, Peon, Army Department.
- Chinnah, Peon, Army Department.
- Lakshmana Row, 1st grade Daffadar, Office of the Deputy Commissioner of Salt, Abkari, and Customs Department, Southern Division, Madras.
- Pathan Kasim Khan, Amin, District Court, North Malabar, Madras.
- Haji Hamid Ali, Government Serang, Kawarchar, Backergunge, Bengal.
- Behari Singh, Jemadar of Chaprassis at Sehore, Central India.
- Din Dayal, Head Peon to the Deputy Commissioner, Jubbulpore, Central Provinces.

=== Royal Red Cross (RRC) ===
- Miss Beatrice Isabel Jones, Matron, Queen Alexandra's Imperial Military Nursing Service.
