= List of chief commissioners of Baluchistan =

Below is a list of chief commissioners of Baluchistan:

== Chief commissioners of Baluchistan ==
- 1877–1887: Sir Oliver St John (acting)
- 1887–1889: Sir Robert Sandeman
- 1889: Sir Harry Prendergast (acting)
- 1889–1891: Sir Robert Sandeman
- 1891: Hugh Barnes
- 1891: Sir Oliver St John
- 1891: Hugh Barnes (acting)
- 1891: John Biddulph (acting)
- 1891–1892: Sir Robert Sandeman
- 1892: Hugh Barnes (acting)
- 1892–1896: Sir James Browne
- 1896: James Adair Crawford (acting)
- 1896–1899: Hugh Barnes
- 1899: Henry Wylie (acting)
- 1899–1900: Hugh Barnes
- 1900–1904: Charles Yate
- 1904–1905: John Ramsay (acting)
- 1905–1907: Alexander Tucker (acting)
- 1907–1909: Sir Henry McMahon
- 1909: Charles Archer (acting)
- 1909–1911: Sir Henry McMahon
- 1911–1912: John Ramsay
- 1912: Charles Archer (acting)
- 1912–1914: John Ramsay
- 1914: Charles Archer (acting)
- 1914–1915: John Ramsay
- 1915: Charles Archer (acting)
- 1915–1917: John Ramsay
- 1917–1919: Henry Dobbs
- 1919–1922: Armine Dew
- 1922–1923: Henry St John (acting)
- 1923–1926: Frederick Johnston
- 1926–1927: Edmond James (acting)
- 1927–1929: Henry St John
- 1929: Edmond James (acting)
- 1929–1931: Charles Bruce (acting)
- 1931–1932: Norman Cater (acting)
- 1932: John Brett (acting)
- 1932–1936: Norman Cater
- 1936: Ronald Wingate (acting)
- 1936–1937: Arthur Parsons (acting)
- 1937: Ronald Wingate (acting)
- 1937–1938: Olaf Caroe (acting)
- 1938–1939: Arthur Parsons
- 1939–1943: Sir Herbert Metcalfe
- 1943–1946: Rupert Hay
- 1946: Henry Poulton
- 1946–1947: Sir Geoffrey Prior

== See also ==
- Quetta Residency
