= Charles Wylie (British Army officer) =

British Army lieutenant colonel

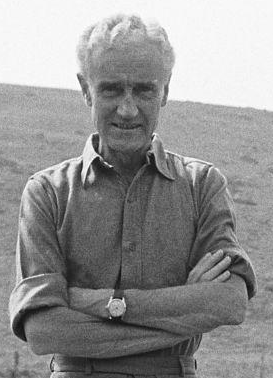
- Born: Charles Geoffrey Wylie; 24 December 1919; Bakloh, Himachal Pradesh
- Died: 18 July 2007 (aged 87); Guildford, Surrey
- Military career
- Allegiance: United Kingdom
- Branch: British Army
- Rank: Lieutenant colonel
- Commands: 10th Royal Gurkha Rifles
- Conflicts: Second World War
- Awards: OBE

Charles Geoffrey Wylie OBE (24 December 1919 – 18 July 2007) was a British Army lieutenant colonel. He was also the organising secretary to the 1953 British Mount Everest expedition and early member of the Army Mountaineering Association, membership number 142, joining in April 1958 shortly after the Association's inauguration in 1957.

== Biography ==
Wylie was the son of Lieutenant-Colonel Macleod Wylie, who was Recruiting Officer for Gurkhas, one of his grandfathers was Henry Wylie, who had been the British Resident at Nepal (1891–1899). He was born at Bakloh, Himachal Pradesh, regimental home of the 4th Gurkhas in the Punjab hills, and by the age of six he was fluent in the language of his garrison playmates. He was educated at Marlborough College where his housemaster was Edwin Kempson, who was a member of both the 1935 British Mount Everest reconnaissance expedition and the 1936 British Mount Everest expedition. Kempson played a key part in teaching Wiley to climb, wih summer seasons in the Alps and Scottish winter climbs.

After retirement Charles worked on behalf of charities as Secretary of the Gurkha Welfare Trust and the Britain-Nepal Medical Trust and was Chairman of the Britain-Nepal Society for five years. He was an Honorary member of the Himalayan Club.

He was awarded an OBE in the 1995 New Year Honours in recognition of his charitable work. He died in Guildford on 18 July 2007.

== Army service ==
During 1938 and the first half of 1939 Wiley was trained at the Royal Military Academy, Sandhurst. He was commissioned in 1939 and sailed to India to join the 2nd battalion of the 1st Gurkha Rifles, after a short posting in Punjab he was stationed wih his regiment in sight of the Nepali Himalaya in Dharmshala, where he had been spent his childhood years and where the Gurkha Rifles were based.

He served with 10th Gurkha Rifles during WW2 and after capture by the Japanese he spent 1942-1945 in POW camps in Malaya and on the Burma-Thailand Railway.

From 1961 to 1964, Wylie held the post of British Military Attaché in Kathmandu.

== Everest 1953 ==
In the build up to the British 1953 expedition Wylie worked full-time on the preparations with John Hunt. On Everest itself he reached Camp VI at 23,000 feet (7,000 m) on the Lhotse Face whilst leading a large group of Sherpas to establish the camp on the South Col.

== Machapuchare, 1957 ==
In 1957 Wylie joined an expedition to Machapuchare in Nepal (6,993 m (22,943 ft)) led by Lieutenant Colonel Jimmy Roberts. The party included Roger Chorley, David Cox and Wilfrid Noyce. Wylie climbed to Camp IV at 20,400 ft (6,200 m) with Cox and Noyce. Further progress involved crossing an ice ridge and descending by rope to a glacier below. In order to safeguard the return, Wylie remained at the camp with one of the sherpas whilst Cox and Noyce continued over the ice ridge and thence towards the summit.

Cox and Noyce successfully climbed to within 150 ft (46 m) of the summit via the north ridge (an approximate altitude of 22,793 ft (6,947 m)), in accordance with restrictions placed on the summit itself. Whilst they were doing this Wylie and the sherpa, Tashi, dug a tunnel right through the little ridge, 25 ft. below its crest and 15 ft. long to make the return journey shorter and safer for Cox and Noyce.
