= Henry McMahon =

British military officer, colonial official and diplomat (1862–1949)

Lieutenant Colonel Sir Henry McMahon GCMG GCVO KCIE CSI KStJ
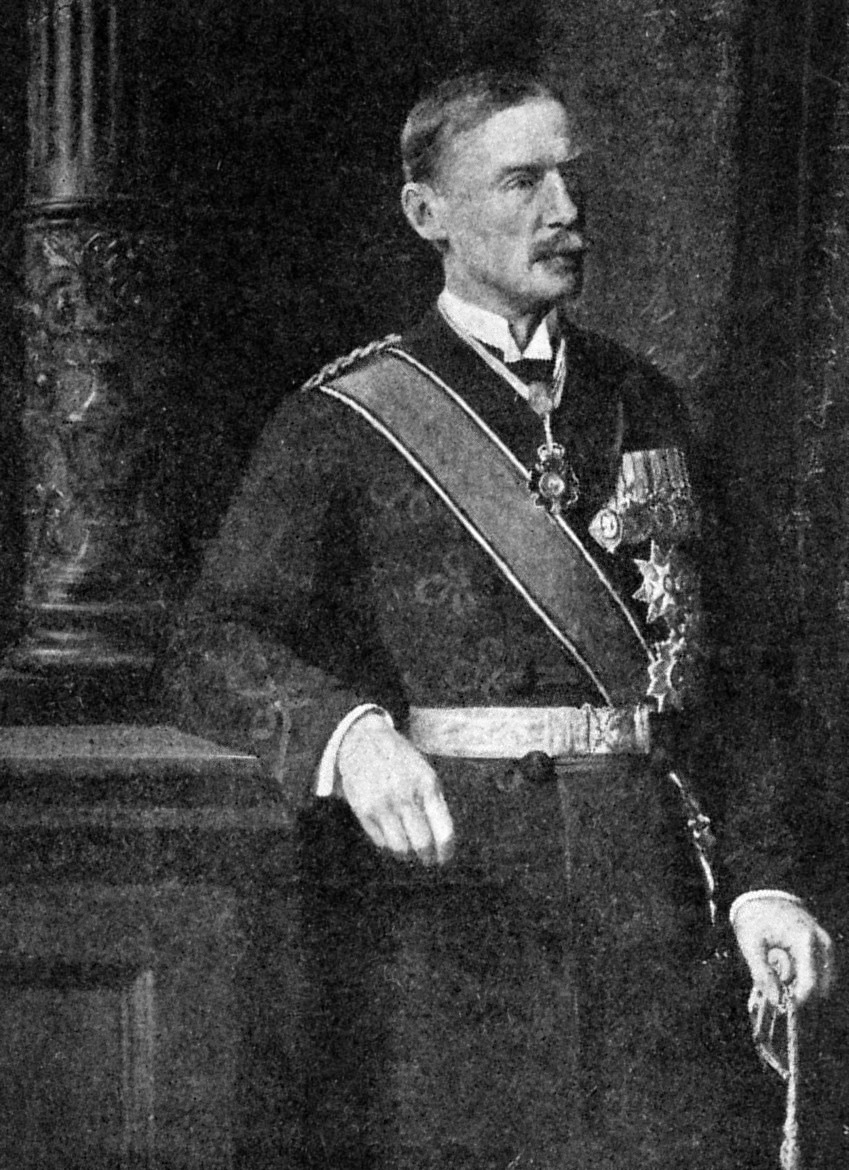
- Painting of Henry McMahon by John Collier, c. 1915

British High Commissioner to Egypt
- In office January 1915 – January 1917
- Monarch: George V
- Preceded by: Milne Cheetham
- Succeeded by: Reginald Wingate

Personal details
- Born: 28 November 1862 Simla, Punjab Province, British India
- Died: 29 December 1949 (aged 87) London, United Kingdom
- Occupation: Diplomat, commissioner
- Known for: McMahon-Hussein Correspondence, the McMahon Line, Declaration to the Seven

Lieutenant Colonel Sir Vincent Arthur Henry McMahon GCMG GCVO KCIE CSI KStJ (28 November 1862 – 29 December 1949) was a British Indian Army officer and diplomat who served as Foreign Secretary in the Government of India from 1911 to 1915 and as High Commissioner in Egypt from 1915 to 1917. As the Foreign Secretary McMahon conducted the tripartite negotiations between Tibet, China and Britain that led to the Simla Convention. Even though China did not in the end sign the Convention, the agreement governed the British relations with Tibet till 1947. In Egypt, McMahon was best known for the McMahon-Hussein Correspondence with Hussein bin Ali, Sharif of Mecca, and the Declaration to the Seven in response to a memorandum written by seven notable Syrians. After the Sykes-Picot Agreement was published by the Bolshevik Russian government in November 1917, McMahon resigned. He also features prominently in Seven Pillars of Wisdom, T.E. Lawrence's account of the Arab Revolt against the Ottoman Empire during World War I.

== Early life ==
McMahon was the son of Lieutenant-General Charles Alexander McMahon, FRS, FGS (1830–1904), a geologist and Commissioner of both Lahore and Hisar in Punjab, India, and who, like his father, Captain Alexander McMahon (born 1791, Kilrea, County Londonderry, Ireland), had been an officer with the East India Company.

He was educated in England at Haileybury College, the recently founded successor of the East India Company College. When he joined the school, his father had an address in Exeter. He then proceeded to the Royal Military College, Sandhurst.

== Family background ==
The Oriel McMahons are the Gaelic clan of Mac Mathghamhna who had come originally from the medieval Irish kingdom of Oriel in South Ulster, where they reigned from around 1250 until about 1600.

Henry McMahon's own family had settled in the Downpatrick area of County Down before his great-grandfather, Arthur McMahon, moved to Kilrea, where he was minister of the local Presbyterian congregation between 1789 and 1794: a prominent Irish Republican, Arthur McMahon was a member of the National Directory of the Society of United Irishmen and one of their colonels in Ulster during the Irish Rebellion of 1798. He apparently fought at the battles of Saintfield and Ballynahinch. Following the rebels' overall defeat, he was able to flee to France, where he served with Napoleon's Irish Legion. It has been reported that he was captured by the British during the Walcheren Campaign of 1809 and sent to England, but was later able to return to France where, in June 1815, he eventually died fighting at either Ligny or Waterloo.

== Career ==
=== British India ===
McMahon was commissioned as a lieutenant into the King's (Liverpool) Regiment on 10 March 1883. He transferred to the Indian Staff Corps in 1885, joining the 1st Sikh Infantry in the Punjab Frontier Force.

In 1887, McMahon joined the Punjab Commission (civil service). He transferred to the Indian Political Department in 1890, serving in it till 1915. His various positions included North-West Frontier, Zhob and Thal-Chotiali agencies in Balochistan, Gilgit, Dir–Swat–Chitral and finally as the Agent to the Governor-General for Balochistan (a position that combined the Chief Commissioner for British Baluchistan and Political Resident for the Baluchistan Agency). During these years he was promoted to captain on 10 March 1894, and major on 10 July 1901. He received the temporary rank of colonel while employed on special duty on the Sistan frontier in 1903.

McMahon spoke Persian, Pashto, and Hindustani, and his aptitude for languages led him also to learn Arabic.

In 1911, the Viceroy Lord Hardinge appointed McMahon as the Foreign Secretary to the Government of India. He held this position till 1915. During 1913–1914, McMahon was responsible for holding the tripartite conference to negotiate the Simla Convention between Tibet, China and Britain, and acting as Britain's plenipoteniary. Though the conference failed to produce a signed convention between all three parties, Tibet and Britain did agree the draft convention, which governed their mutual relations till the end of British rule in India. Tibet and Britain also agreed their mutual border in the northeast India, which bears the name McMahon Line.

=== Middle East ===
In 1915, McMahon was sent to replace Sir Milne Cheetham, briefly acting for Lord Kitchener, who had become War Secretary in London, in the post of High Commissioner in the Sultanate of Egypt. When he arrived by train, Ronald Storrs, a member of the Arab Bureau, described him as "quiet, friendly, agreeable, considerate and cautious", although later in his career Storrs and others were not so charitable. McMahon was made a Knight of Grace of the Most Venerable Order of the Hospital of Saint John of Jerusalem (KStJ).

Although a temporary appointment, it became a permanent post, for an experienced political administrator. With the approval of Kitchener and Foreign Secretary Sir Edward Grey, McMahon began a long correspondence with Husayn bin Ali, Sharif of Mecca, the Ottoman-appointed ruler of the Hijaz, to use the Bedouin tribes under his control to support the Egyptian Expeditionary Force in overthrowing the Ottomans. He promised Husayn an independent area under Arab governance that was to include what was then the Mutasarrifate of Jerusalem (later Mandatory Palestine), in exchange for Arab support in Britain's conflict against the Ottoman Turks in what came to be known as the Great Arab Revolt against the Ottomans. Their correspondence is known to historians from the McMahon–Hussein Correspondence.

Sir Gilbert Clayton, Aubrey Herbert, Storrs and others of the intelligence community approved of McMahon's pro-Arabist policy from 1916 onwards. McMahon sat on the plan to use the Sharif to support British for six months. But it was Sir Reginald Wingate who persuaded McMahon that the Arabs were ready, able and willing for Cairo to support Husayn in an effort to overthrow the Ottomans and establish a pan-Arab state made up of Ottoman Arab lands in the Middle East. Storrs thought the diplomacy was "in every way exaggerated." He was appointed a Knight Grand Cross of the Most Distinguished Order of Saint Michael and Saint George (GCMG) in 1916 upon his retirement from the British Indian Army.

By May 1916, Turkish troops had arrived in Mecca, and McMahon received a telegram from Abdullah ibn Husayn, Sharif Husayn's son, that the Movement was ready. McMahon despatched the oriental secretary, Storrs, to London with a team of intelligence experts. The British decision to land an invasion force in the Dardanelles, instead of Alexandretta, and to promise the French Syria under the Sykes-Picot Agreement, irritated McMahon.

On 23 November 1917, following the October Revolution, the Bolsheviks released copies of the Sykes–Picot Agreement and other secret treaties, publishing their full texts in Izvestia and Pravda. The Manchester Guardian then printed the texts on 26 November 1917. This caused great embarrassment to the Allies and growing distrust between them and the Arabs, and McMahon resigned his post in protest.

== Honours in retirement ==
In 1920, McMahon was awarded the Order of El Nahda, 1st Class, by Husayn, the new King of the Hejaz. In 1925, he was promoted to a Knight of Justice of the Most Venerable Order of the Hospital of Saint John of Jerusalem (KStJ).

McMahon was one of the founders of the Imperial College Masonic Lodge in 1923, at which time he was also a member of the governing body of Imperial College.

== Personal life ==
On 19 October 1886, in Bombay, McMahon married Mary E. Bland, a daughter of F. C. Bland of Derriquin Castle, County Kerry. Their daughter Jessica was born in 1887. In 1909, at the church of St George's, Hanover Square, London, she married Henry A. Hetherington, of Berechurch Hall, Colchester.

McMahon and his wife retired to England. McMahon died on 29 December 1949 at the Cadogan Hotel in Sloane Street, Chelsea, where he had been living. He was survived by his wife. He left an estate valued at £26,918, probate for which was granted to Jessica Merriell Hetherington and Lord Courtauld-Thomson. McMahon was buried in the Golders Green Cemetery.

== Arms ==
Coat of arms of Henry McMahon
Notes Granted 10 April 1924 by Sir Nevile Rodwell Wilkinson, Ulster King of Arms. Crest On a wreath of the colours a bear rampant Sable holding an antique crown Or. Escutcheon Per pale Or and Gules an ostrich counterchanged holding in the beak a horseshoe Proper on a canton of the second a bear rampant Sable. Motto Deum Timens Solum

== Taxa named in his honour ==
- A species of Asian viper, Eristicophis macmahoni, is named in honour of Henry McMahon.
- Eirenis mcmahoni, also named in his honour, is considered a synonym of Eirenis persicus.
- The Pakistani fish Labeo macmahoni is potentially named in his honour.

Political offices
Preceded by Sir Milne Cheetham	British High Commissioner in Egypt; 9 January 1915 – 1 January 1917	Succeeded by Sir Reginald Wingate
Preceded by Alexander Lauzun Pendock Tucker	Chief Commissioner of Balochistan; 2 April 1907 – 3 June 1909	Succeeded by Charles Archer
Preceded by Charles Archer	Chief Commissioner of Balochistan; 6 September 1909 – 25 April 1911	Succeeded by John Ramsay
