= Richard Bruce =

Richard Bruce may refer to:

- Richard Bruce Nugent (1906–1987), also Richard Bruce, writer and painter in the Harlem Renaissance
- Richard Isaac Bruce (1840–1926), English colonial officer and administrator
- Richard Bruce, pseudonym used by Robert Bache Smith (1875–1951), American librettist and lyricist
- Richard Bruce, or The Life That Now Is (1891) a work by the Christian preacher, Charles Sheldon

== See also ==
- Richard Francis-Bruce (born 1948), Australian film editor
