= Hugh Shakespear Barnes =

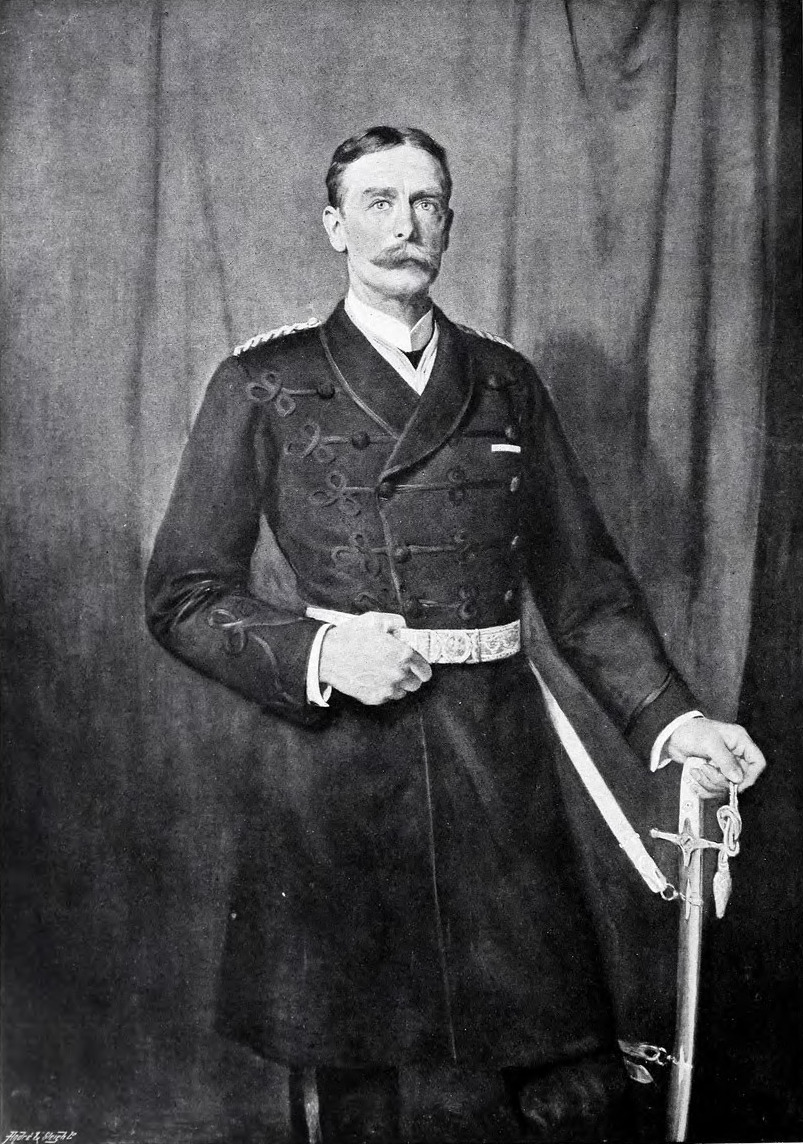
- portrait by John Collier
- Born: 14 July 1853; Shahjahanpur, Uttar Pradesh
- Died: 15 February 1940 (aged 86)
- Occupations: Administrator in British India, Chief Commissioner of Baluchistan

Sir Hugh Shakespear Barnes KCSI KCVO (14 July 1853 – 15 February 1940) was an English administrator in British India. He served as Chief Commissioner of Baluchistan several times during the 19th century, and was Lieutenant-Governor of Burma from 1903 to 1905.

== Early life and education ==
Barnes was born in Shahjahanpur, Uttar Pradesh, to James Ralph Barnes, a member of the British Indian Civil Service, and Mary Jane Thompson. His maternal great-grandfather, George Nesbitt Thompson, (1753–1831), was private secretary to Warren Hastings. His mother's brother was Sir Rivers Thompson, Lieutenant-Governor of Bengal, while his father's brother George Carnac Barnes, Commissioner of the Cis-Sutlej states. He was educated at Malvern College. His brother, Herbert Curie Barnes, served as Private Secretary to the Chief Commissioner of Burma.

== Career ==
Hugh Barnes joined the Indian Civil Service in 1874, after placing atop the entrance examination. He was appointed Chief Commissioner of Baluchistan in 1891 (twice), and served further terms in 1896–1899 and 1899–1900. In 1899, he was appointed Foreign Secretary to the Government of India. After the accession of King Edward VII, Barnes was appointed chair of a central executive committee set up to arrange a Durbar to commemorate the new reign. It was in this capacity he attended the January 1903 Delhi Durbar, and it fell to him to initiate the main ceremony by officially asking the Viceroy to declare the Durbar open.

It was announced in August 1902 that Barnes was to be appointed Lieutenant-Governor of Burma in succession to Sir Frederick Fryer, whose term ended in early 1903. Barnes was received in audience by King Edward VII March before he went out to Burma where he took up the appointment from April 1903, serving until May 1905, in which year he became a Member of the Council of India.

He was appointed a Knight Commander of the Order of the Star of India (KCSI) in the 1903 Durbar Honours.

== Personal life ==
Barnes married Winifred Strachey, daughter of John Strachey, another Indian civil servant and a member of the prominent Strachey family. So many members of the Strachey family served in India that they were known jokingly as the "Strachey government." Barnes' daughter, Mary Barnes Hutchinson, was to become a writer and member of the Bloomsbury Group.

Political offices
Preceded by Sir Robert Groves Sandeman	Chief Commissioner of Balochistan; 1891	Succeeded by Sir Oliver Beauchamp Coventry St John
Preceded by Sir Oliver Beauchamp Coventry St John	Chief Commissioner of Balochistan (acting); 1891	Succeeded by John Biddulph
Preceded by Sir Robert Groves Sandeman	Chief Commissioner of Balochistan (acting); 1892	Succeeded by Sir James Browne
Preceded by James Adair Crawford	Chief Commissioner of Balochistan; 1896–1899	Succeeded by Henry Wylie
Preceded by Henry Wylie	Chief Commissioner of Balochistan; 1899–1900	Succeeded by Charles Edward Yate
Preceded by Frederick William Richard Fryer	Lieutenant Governor of British Crown Colony of Burma; 1903–1905	Succeeded by Sir Herbert Thirkell White
