= Charles Edward Bruce =

British politician

- Born: 23 March 1876; British India
- Died: 26 January 1950 (aged 73); Finchampstead, Berkshire, England
- Spouse: Doris (née Wilding)

Lieutenant-Colonel Charles Edward Bruce CSI CIE CBE (23 March 1876 – 26 January 1950) was a British Indian Army officer and British colonial administrator. He served as the Chief Commissioner of Baluchistan in the 1920s.

== Biography ==
Bruce was born in India, the son of Richard Isaac Bruce CIE of the Indian Civil Service. He was educated in England at Wellington College and the Royal Military College, Sandhurst. From Sandhurst, he was commissioned into the Lancashire Fusiliers and within the year was transferred to the 24th Baluchistan Regiment. He took part in the Boxer Rebellion in China and also some frontier wars of the North-Western Frontier.

Bruce then joined the Political Department, where he became a devoted follower of the policies of Sir Robert Groves Sandeman. As noted by The Times: "[Bruce] became so deeply attracted by its success that he held it to be applicable to the tribes of quite different calibre in the Frontier regions invisibly divided by the Durand Line. He was proud to be called to act as Chief Commissioner of Baluchistan in 1930. He retired in 1931 and when opportunity offered he spoke in advocacy of Sandemanization."

== Honours ==
Bruce was appointed an Officer of the Order of the British Empire in the 1919 New Year Honours, when he was serving as a political officer with Marri Punitive Force, Baluchistan. He was appointed a Companion of the Order of the Indian Empire in the 1920 New Year Honours for services in India involving the Third Anglo-Afghan War. Third Anglo-Afghan War

He was promoted to Commander of the Order of the British Empire in the 1925 Birthday Honours. He was appointed a Companion of the Order of the Star of India in 1929.

Political offices
Preceded by Edmond Henry Salt James	Chief Commissioner of Balochistan; 1 October 1929 – 17 December 1931	Succeeded by Norman Cater
