= Harry Prendergast =

British General (1834–1913)

General Sir Harry Prendergast VC GCB
- Prendergast in 1886
- Born: 15 October 1834; Madras, India
- Died: 24 July 1913 (aged 78); Richmond-upon-Thames, Surrey
- Burial place: Richmond Cemetery
- Relatives: Thomas Prendergast (father); General Sir Harry Aubrey de Vere Maclean (son-in-law)
- Military career
- Allegiance: United Kingdom; East India Company
- Branch: Madras Army; British Army; British Indian Army
- Service years: 1854–1892
- Rank: General
- Units: Madras Engineers; Royal Engineers
- Conflicts: Anglo-Persian War; Indian Rebellion of 1857; Abyssinian War; Third Anglo-Burmese War
- Awards: Victoria Cross; Knight Grand Cross of the Order of the Bath

General Sir Harry North Dalrymple Prendergast, VC, GCB (15 October 1834 – 24 July 1913) was a British military officer who served with the Madras Army, Indian Army and British Army. He was a recipient of the Victoria Cross (VC), the highest and most prestigious award for gallantry in the face of the enemy that can be awarded to members of British and, in imperial times, Commonwealth forces.

== Early life ==
Prendergast was the son of Thomas Prendergast and Caroline Lucy (née Dalrymple). He was educated at Cheam School and then Brighton College and, in later years, was President of their old boys' association. He also attended Addiscombe Military Seminary and the Royal School of Military Engineering. He was commissioned in the Madras Engineers of the Madras Army in 1854, serving in the Persian War before returning to India in 1857.

== Victoria Cross action ==
Prendergast was 23 years old and a lieutenant in the Madras Sappers, Madras Army during the Indian Rebellion of 1857 when the following deeds took place for which he was awarded the VC:

For conspicuous bravery on the 21st of November, 1857, at Mundisore, in saving the life of Lieutenant G. Dew, 14th Light Dragoons, at the risk of his own, by attempting to cut down a valaitee, who covered him (Lieutenant Dew) with his piece, from only a few paces to the rear. Lieutenant Prendergast was wounded in this affair by the discharge of the piece, and would probably have been cut down, had not the rebel been killed by Major Orr.

He also distinguished himself by his gallantry in the actions at Ratgurh and Betwa, when he was severely wounded. Major-General Sir Hugh Rose, in forwarding his recommendation of this Officer, states:

"Lieutenant Prendergast, Madras Engineers, was specially mentioned by Brigadier, now Sir Charles Stuart, for the gallant act at Mundisore, when he was severely wounded; secondly, he was specially mentioned by me when acting voluntarily as my Aide-de-Camp in the Action before besieging Ratgurh on the Beena river, for gallant conduct. His horse was killed on that occasion. Thirdly, at the action of 'the Betwa', he again voluntarily acted as my Aide-de-Camp, and distinguished himself by his bravery in the charge, which I made with Captain Need's Troop, Her Majesty's 14th Light Dragoons, against the left of the so-called Peishwa's Army, under Tantia Topee. He was severely wounded on that occasion."

He received his VC from Queen Victoria at the Quadrangle of Windsor Castle on 4 January 1860 along with twenty-four other recipients of the decoration.

== Later service ==
Towards the end of the Indian Rebellion, Prendergast served in the Central Indian campaign, and was invalided home in April 1858 after a serious wound permanently disabled his left arm. He however continued to serve in the Indian Army, and in 1867 was appointed field engineer to the Abyssinian War (1867–68), after which he was promoted to brevet lieutenant-colonel. In 1878 he commanded the Indian engineers sent to Malta and Cyprus at the time of the Congress of Berlin, followed by a number of posts within India. He was promoted major-general in April 1883.

Although only a relatively junior general officer, in October 1885 Prendergast was selected to lead the Burma Field Force in the Third Anglo-Burmese War. He achieved initial success, with Mandalay occupied on 29 November 1885, and was created a Knight Commander of the Order of the Bath (KCB) in recognition. However, with limited resources at his disposal, the subsequent Burmese insurgency campaign went less well, damaging Prendergast's reputation. Although promoted lieutenant-general (1886) and general (1887), he was offered no further senior commands, and he retired in 1892.

In retirement, Prendergast was appointed a Knight Grand Cross of the Order of the Bath (GCB) in the 1902 Coronation Honours list, and was invested by King Edward VII at Buckingham Palace on 8 August 1902. In 1908 he was appointed Colonel-Commandant of the Royal Engineers.

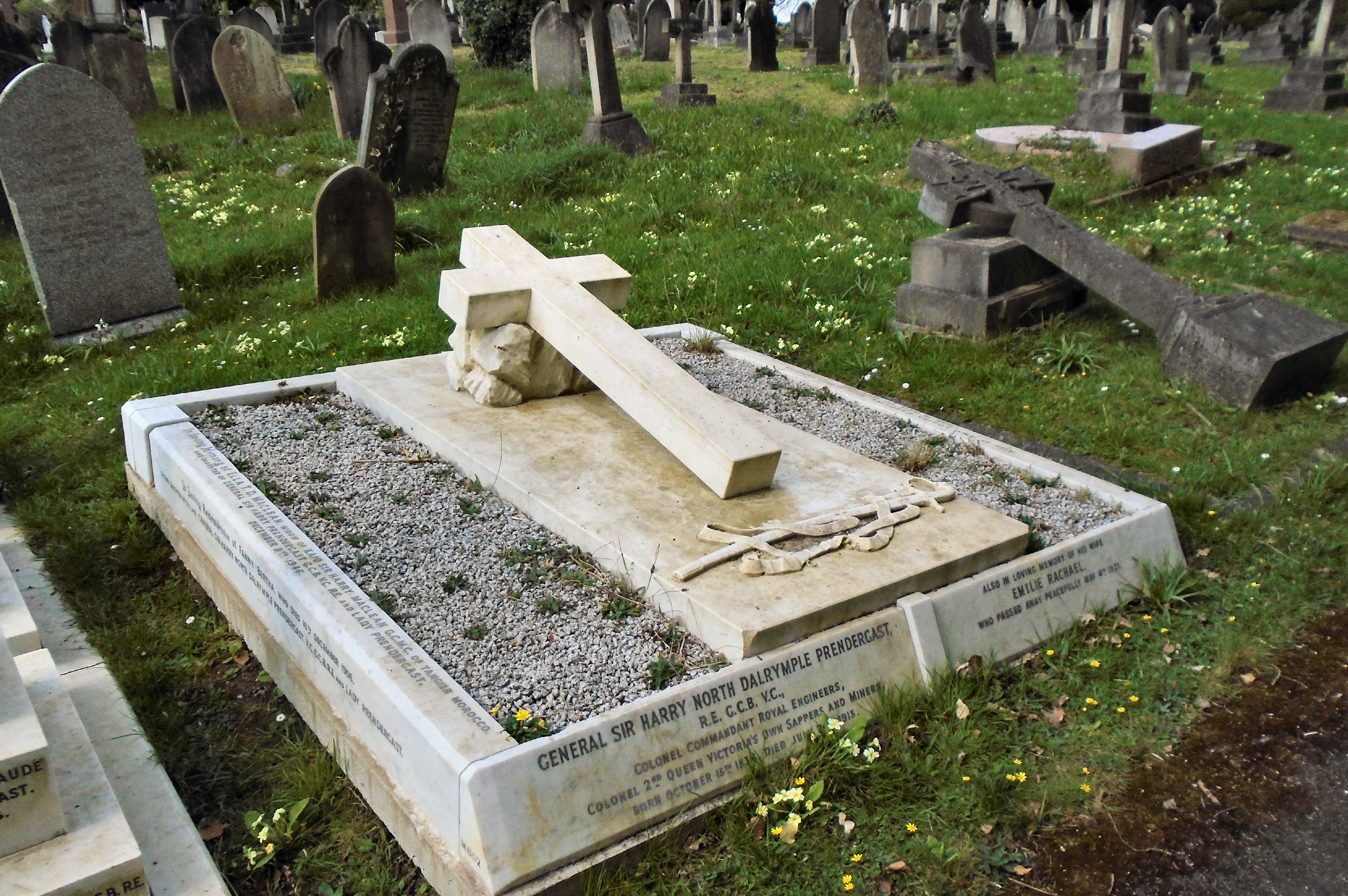
Richmond cemetery

He died aged 78 at Heron Court, Richmond, Surrey, now in London, on 24 July 1913 and is buried in Richmond Cemetery.

His recreations were listed as "boxing, fencing, sword-play, running, cricket, football, hunting and polo".

There is a bronze memorial tablet to him in Brighton College Chapel, but his sword that used to hang above it was stolen.

== Family ==
Prendergast was married to Emilie Rachael, and had several children:

- George William Yelverton Prendergast (ca. 1871–1903; second son), who served in the diplomatic service from 1896. He was British Vice-Consul at Scutari, Albania from May 1901, and for several months acted as Chargé d'affaires at Cetinje. He died at Menton, Alpes-Maritimes on 6 January 1903 aged 31.
- Ella Prendergast, who married in 1913 General Sir Harry Aubrey de Vere Maclean

== The medal ==
In the 1980s the medal, on loan from the Prendergast family to the National Army Museum was suggested to be a copy. However, a subsequent 2020 study of its metal composition demonstrated it was an unusually close match to other Victoria Crosses, and in particular those dated to the same year, suggesting it was in fact genuine. The medal is currently displayed at the Royal Engineers Museum in Chatham, England.

== Sources ==
- Colonel H M Vibart, The Life of General Sir Harry N D Prendergast, RE, VC, GCB (The Happy Warrior). (Eveleigh Nash, London, 1914)
- Martin D W Jones, 'The War of Lost Footsteps. A Re-assessment of the Third Burmese War 1885–1896.', The Bulletin of the Military Historical Society, xxxx no. 157 (August 1989), pp. 36–40
- The Register of the Victoria Cross (This England, 1997)
- The Sapper VCs (Gerald Napier, 1998)
- Monuments to Courage (David Harvey, 1999)

Government offices
Preceded by Sir Robert Sanderman	Chief Commissioner of Balochistan (acting); 1889	Succeeded by Sir Robert Sanderman
