= Frederick William Johnston =

British politician (1872–1947)

- Born: 1872
- Died: 1947 (aged 74–75)

Sir Frederick William Johnston, KCIE, CSI, ISO (1872–1947) was a colonial administrator in British India.

== Life ==
He was born in Cambuslang, Lanarkshire, the son of the Rev. Alexander Orrock Johnston, and was educated at Kelvinside Academy, the University of Glasgow, and Trinity Hall, Cambridge, graduating B.A. in 1894. He entered the Indian Civil Service in 1896.

He served as the Chief Commissioner of Balochistan in the 1920s during colonial rule, as well as the Chief Political Resident of the Persian Gulf.

Johnston was appointed a Companion of the Order of the Indian Empire (CIE) in the 1911 Delhi Durbar Honours, a Companion of the Order of the Star of India (CSI) in the 1913 Birthday Honours, and promoted to Knight Commander of the Order of the Indian Empire (KCIE) in the 1927 Birthday Honours.

Political offices
Preceded by Henry Beauchamp St. John	Chief Commissioner of Balochistan; 15 September 1923 – 7 July 1926	Succeeded by Edmond Henry Salt James
Preceded by Lionel Berkeley Holt Haworth	Chief Political Resident of the Persian Gulf; 1928–1929	Succeeded by Cyril Charles Johnson Barrett
