= John Aloysius Brett =

British politician (1879–1955)

- Born: 1879
- Died: 1955 (aged 75–76)

John Aloysius Brett (1879–1955) was an administrator in British India. He served as Chief Commissioner of Baluchistan during the 1930s.

Brett was commissioned as a Second lieutenant in the Royal Garrison Artillery on 26 May 1900, and was promoted to the rank of Lieutenant on 7 March 1902. He transferred to the Indian Staff Corps later the same year.

Political offices
Preceded by Norman Cater	Chief Commissioner of Balochistan; 10 May 1932 – 1 October 1932	Succeeded by Norman Cater
