= Armine Dew =

British soldier and administrator (1867–1941)

Armine Brereton Dew
- Born: 27 September 1867
- Died: 7 June 1941 (aged 73)
- Occupations: British soldier and administrator

Lieutenant-Colonel Sir Armine Brereton Dew KCIE CSI (1867–1941) was a British Indian Army officer and administrator in British India; he served as the chief commissioner of Balochistan during colonial rule.

He was the son of Major Frederick Napoleon Dew, J.P., D.L. Herefordshire.

He was educated at Wellington College then in February 1886 was commissioned into the 4th Battalion of the Shropshire Light Infantry, a unit of the Militia.

Then Dew obtained a commission into the regular army, being commissioned into the Royal Inniskilling Fusiliers in November 1888. He was appointed to the Indian Army and the Queen's Own Corps of Guides in December 1889. He was promoted to lieutenant in 1891 and took part in the Hazara 1891 operations (earning medal & clasp). Attached the Gilgit Agency, 1894, appointed to civil employment with the Political Department with the North West Frontier Province in December 1897 and promoted captain in 1899.

He married in 1900 to Esme Mary, daughter of Sir Adelbert Talbot, KCIE.

Promoted to major in 1906. He was political agent in Gilgit from 1908 to 1912 in 1911 was appointed a CIE. He was promoted to lieutenant-colonel in 1914. He was political agent for the princely state of Kalat from 1912 to 1917 and was appointed a CSI in 1915. He was mentioned in despatches in the London Gazette 31 October 1917.

He was appointed revenue and judicial commissioner, Baluchistan, 1917; Agent to the governor-general and chief commissioner, Baluchistan, 1919–22.

He was knighted with the KCIE in 1921.

He retired on 1 December 1922.

== Styles ==
- 1867-1886: Armine Brereton Dew
- 1886-1891: Second Lieutenant Armine Brereton Dew
- 1891-1899: Lieutenant Armine Brereton Dew
- 1899-1906: Captain Armine Brereton Dew
- 1906-1911: Major Armine Brereton Dew
- 1911-1914: Major Armine Brereton Dew, CIE
- 1914-1915: Lieutenant-Colonel Armine Brereton Dew, CIE
- 1915-1921: Lieutenant-Colonel Armine Brereton Dew, CSI, CIE
- 1921-1941: Lieutenant-Colonel Sir Armine Brereton Dew, KCIE, CSI

Political offices
Preceded by Henry Dobbs	Chief Commissioner of Balochistan; 2 September 1919 – 13 June 1922	Succeeded by Henry Beauchamp St. John
