= Henry Beauchamp St John =

British politician (1874–1954)

Henry Beauchamp St. John
- Born: 26 August 1874; Hampshire, England
- Died: 5 October 1954 (aged 80); Beaulieu, Hampshire

Lieutenant-Colonel Sir Henry Beauchamp St John, KCIE, CBE (26 August 1874 – 5 October 1954) was a British Indian Army and Indian Political Service officer.

== Biography ==
St John was born on 26 August 1874, the son of Colonel Sir Oliver Beauchamp Coventry St John, KCSI, RE, and educated at Bedford School.

He was originally commissioned into the Duke of Cornwall's Light Infantry in 1893, and transferred to the Indian Staff Corps in 1894. He served on the North West Frontier with the 45th (Rattray's) Sikhs at the defence of Malakand; relief of Chakdara, Malakand; action of Landakai; operations in Bajaur and in the Mamund Country; Tirah 1897, operations in the Barah Valley 7 to 14 December 1897. He was promoted to captain on 30 August 1902.

He was made a Companion of the Order of the Indian Empire (CIE) in 1913 and a Commander (military) of the Order of the British Empire (CBE), and mentioned in despatches for valuable services in the field during the Third Afghan War (London Gazette 3 August 1920). Was an administrator in British India, his many political appointments included Agent to the Governor General, Punjab States 1925–27; he twice served as the Chief Commissioner of Baluchistan. He was Prime Minister of Jaipur State from 1933 to 1939. He was knighted and appointed a KCIE in the New Years Honours list of 1 January 1930. In retirement, in his last years, he lived at Beaulieu, Hampshire.

In 1907 he married Olive Herbert, daughter of the late Colonel C. Herbert CSI, they had one son.

Political offices
Preceded by Armine Brereton Dew	Chief Commissioner of Baluchistan; June 1922-15 September 1923	Succeeded by Frederick William Johnston
Preceded by Edmond Henry Salt James	Chief Commissioner of Baluchistan; 4 November 1927-2 February 1929	Succeeded by Edmond Henry Salt James
