= Thomas Prendergast =

British civil servant and writer

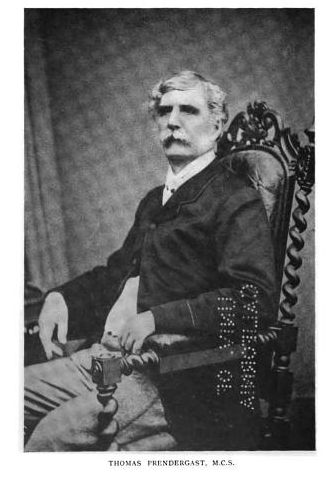
- Born: 1806
- Died: 14 November 1886 (aged 79–80); Cheltenham, England
- Employer: East India Company
- Known for: The "mastery system" of learning foreign languages
- Notable work: The Mastery of Languages (1864)
- Children: Harry Prendergast

Thomas Prendergast (1806 – 14 November 1886) was a British administrator in the service of the East India Company, and the inventor of the "mastery system" of learning foreign languages.

== Biography ==
Prendergast was the son of Sir Jeffery Prendergast, born at Clonmel in 1769, who was in the service of the East India Company, becoming colonel of the 39th native infantry in 1825. Sir Jeffery served in the Mysore War, was knighted in 1838, promoted to the rank of general in 1854, and died in 1856, having married in 1804 Elizabeth, daughter of Hew Dalrymple of Nunraw.

Thomas was nominated a writer in the East India Company's service on 23 June 1826, and became assistant to the collector of Tanjore, Madras Presidency, in 1828. He was acting head assistant to the collector of Nellore on 16 January 1829, and head assistant on 9 February 1830. In 1831 he became acting sub-collector and joint magistrate of Nellore, in 1833 acting assistant judge at Guntoor, and on 8 August 1834 assistant judge of Tinnevelly, where he remained until 1838. He was afterwards for many years collector and magistrate at Rajahmundry until his retirement on the annuity fund in 1859.

On his return to England he settled at Cheltenham, and soon became totally blind. Despite this misfortune, he devoted himself to literary work, and invented what he called the "mastery system" of learning languages, based on the process pursued by children in learning to speak. By frequently repeating conversational sentences Prendergast had himself acquired the Madras vernacular, Tamil, and Telugu. His system was to some extent a development of the Ollendorffian, but Prendergast elaborated its details on original lines. His success was considerable, and the various manuals in which he practically expounded his views went through numerous editions.

He died at Meldon Cottage, The Park, Cheltenham, and was buried in the new cemetery on 18 November. His son, Sir Harry Prendergast, G.C.B., V.C., was commander in Burma in 1883–6.

== Works ==
- The Mastery of Languages, or the Art of Speaking Foreign Tongues Idiomatically (1864)
- Handbook to the Mastery Series (1868)
- The Mastery Series: French (1868)
- The Mastery Series: German (1868)
- The Mastery Series: Spanish (1869)
- The Mastery Series: Hebrew (1871)
- The Mastery Series: Latin (1872)
