= Edmond James =

British politician (1874–1952)

Edmond Henry Salt James
- Born: 1874
- Died: 1952 (aged 77–78)

Edmond Henry Salt James, CIE, CBE was an administrator in British India. He twice acted as the Chief Commissioner of Baluchistan.

Political offices
Preceded by Frederick William Johnston	Chief Commissioner of Baluchistan; 7 July 1926 – 4 November 1927	Succeeded by Henry Beauchamp St. John
Preceded by Henry Beauchamp St. John	Chief Commissioner of Balochistan; 2 February 1929 – 1 October 1929	Succeeded by Charles Edward Bruce
