= Leonard William Booth =

British civil servant

- Born: 10 June 1856; St. Marylebone, England
- Died: 21 November 1923 (aged 67); Zürich, Switzerland
- Occupation: public servant
- Organization: Ceylon Civil Service
- Spouse: Mary Emily von Dadelszen (m. 1883)
- Children: Horace George Malcolm, Kathleen Frances, Leonard Horace Vertue

Leonard William Booth CMG (10 June 1856 – 21 November 1923) was a British civil servant, who served in Ceylon and was the acting Colonial Secretary of Ceylon from 1911 to 1913.

Leonard William Booth was born on 10 June 1856 in St. Marylebone, England, the second son of George Booth (1825–1910) and Margaret Emily née Browning (1828–1881). He attended Lancing College in West Sussex.

Booth entered the Ceylon Civil Service on 14 March 1878 at the age of 22.

On 6 November 1883 Booth married Mary Emily von Dadelszen (1863–1962), the daughter of Hermann Edward Randall von Dadelszen (1839–1873), a tea planter, and Mary née McClaine, and the granddaughter of Rev. Heinrich Hermann von Dadelszen (1816–1852), the Colonial Chapel of Kandy, in Colombo. They had three children: Horace George Malcolm (b.1887), Kathleen Frances (b. 1889) and Leonard Horace Vertice (b.1898).

Booth had a number of senior positions across the colony, including the Government Agent for the Sabaragamuwa Province (?–1900), North Central Province (1900–1904), Government Agent for the Western Province and Principal Collector of Customs (1912-?) and the Government Agent for the Central Province (1910–1914). He also acted in the position of Colonial Secretary of Ceylon on numerous occasions, from June 1911 through to October 1913, both during the absence of Sir Hugh Charles Clifford and following Clifford's appointment as Governor of the Gold Coast until Sir Reginald Edward Stubbs' arrival in the colony, serving on the Executive Council of Ceylon. In 1913 Booth was appointed a companion in the Order of St Michael and St George, as part of the King's Birthday Honours, for his services as acting Colonial Secretary of the Island of Ceylon.

He retired from the Ceylon Civil Service on 24 January 1914 and returned to Sussex, England. He died on 21 November 1923 in Zürich, Switzerland.
