= Charles Archer =

British politician

- Born: 1861
- Died: 1941 (aged 79–80)

Charles Archer CSI CIE (1861–1941) was an administrator in British India. He was acting Chief Commissioner of Baluchistan province four times. Following military service in the Indian Staff Corps, he began his political career in 1887 as the Assistant to the Agent to the Governor-General of Baluchistan. He collaborated with his brother William in translating three of Ibsen's plays: Rosmersholm, Lady Inger of Ostrat, and Peer Gynt. He was appointed CIE in the 1906 New Year Honours and CSI in the 1911 Delhi Durbar Honours.

Political offices
Preceded by Arthur Henry McMahon	Chief Commissioner of Balochistan; 3 June 1909 – 6 September 1909	Succeeded by Arthur Henry McMahon
Preceded by John Ramsay	Chief Commissioner of Balochistan; 21 October 1912 – 14 November 1912	Succeeded by John Ramsay
Preceded by John Ramsay	Chief Commissioner of Balochistan; 2 April 1914 – 23 May 1914	Succeeded by John Ramsay
Preceded by John Ramsay	Chief Commissioner of Balochistan; 15 June 1915 – 5 July 1915	Succeeded by John Ramsay
