= Norman Cater =

British imperial administrator

Alexander Norman Ley Cater
- Born: 1880
- Died: 1957

Sir Alexander Norman Ley Cater KCIE (15 June 1880 – 21 October 1957) was an administrator in British India.

Born in Lower Bebington, Cheshire, the son of Charles A. Cater, he was educated at Wellington College and Christ's College, Cambridge. He joined the ICS in 1903, arriving in India the following year. He later became a lieutenant in the Hyderabad Rifles. In 1921, he received the Order of the White Elephant, 3rd Class, from the King of Siam. He was appointed a CIE in 1929 and was knighted with the KCIE in 1933. He served as Chief Commissioner of Balochistan during the 1930s.

Political offices
Preceded by Charles Edward Bruce	Chief Commissioner of Balochistan; 17 December 1931 – 10 May 1932	Succeeded by John Aloysius Brett
Preceded by John Aloysius Brett	Chief Commissioner of Balochistan; 1 October 1932 – 1 April 1936	Succeeded by Ronald Evelyn Leslie Wingate
