= Richard Isaac Bruce =

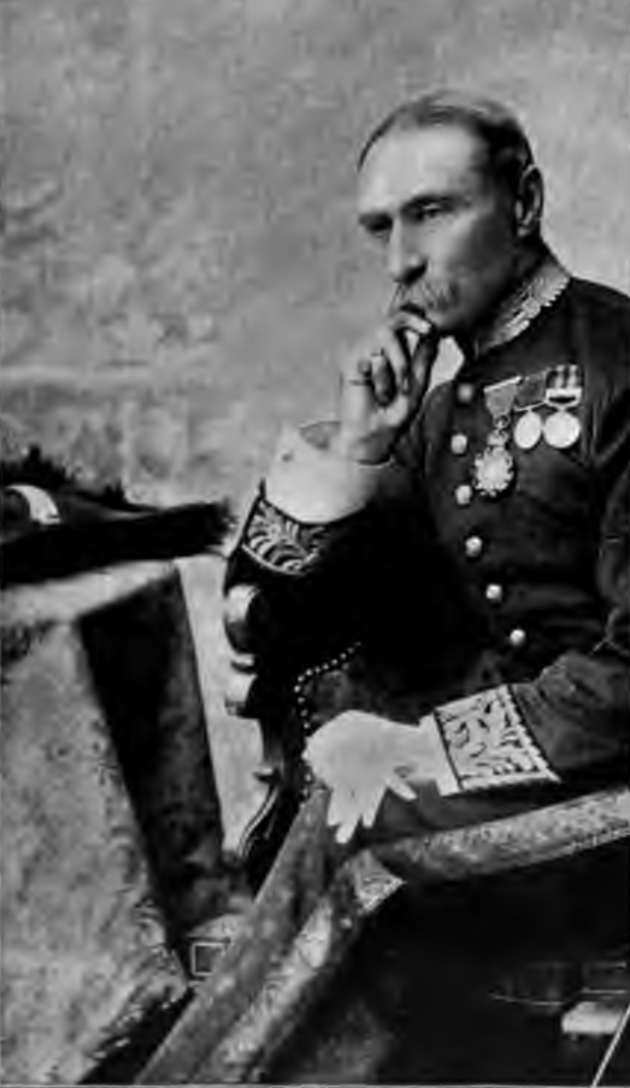
- Frontispiece photo from The Forward Policy and its Results, 1900
- Born: 1840
- Died: 1926 (aged 85–86)
- Occupation: Colonial administrator
- Known for: Author of The Forward Policy, and its Results

Richard Isaac Bruce CIE (1840–1926) was an English colonial officer and administrator serving on India's North West Frontier during the early period of the British Raj. He is notable as the author of The Forward Policy and its Results (1900), part mémoire and biography, part argument supporting a 'Forward Policy' espoused and practised locally by Bruce's superior, Robert Groves Sandeman.

== Biography ==
Richard Isaac Bruce, born in 1840, was the sixth son of Jonathan Bruce, a descendant of the Bruce family of Clackmannan and a landowner with properties in the Ballyhea area of County Cork and in County Limerick, Ireland. Like many landlords of the time, the interests of the Bruce's had been badly damaged by the Great Famine, denying the youngest son the opportunity of a profession and causing him to look instead to empire service. An older brother, the Rev. Robert Bruce, was a missionary for the Church Missionary Society on the North West Frontier, and secured openings for Richard inducing him to travel to Dera Ismail Khan.

He served on the staff of Robert Groves Sandeman; in the Second Anglo-Afghan War in 1878–9; on the North West Frontier of India at Daulatzai, 1884; and in the Zhob Valley Expedition of 1890 which led to the opening of the Gomal Pass in the same year.

He was appointed British Commissioner on the Afghan Waziristan Delimitation Commission, 1894; at Wano, 1894; and in Waziristan, 1894–5. He received thanks of Government on several occasions for distinguished services on the Frontier. He took on the work of Sandeman on his death in 1892, seeking to extend British influence across the Durand Line by supporting and influencing key tribal leaders - a system which had worked successfully with the Baluch tribes-people, who maintained a hierarchical authority system. This 'Sandeman system' worked less well with the Pathans of Waziristan, who organised themselves on a more consensual basis through the Jirga.

Bruce died in 1926; his papers are stored in The National Archive.

== Family ==
Bruce married Lilla, daughter of the Rev. J. Beavor Webb, rector of Dunderrow, and their issue was:

1. Jonathan Maxwell, captain in the Indian army
2. Rev. Robert Evans
3. Charles Edward Bruce, entered the Indian army and later followed in father's footsteps, eventually being appointed Chief Commissioner of Baluchistan in the 1920s.
4. Richard
5. Oliver
6. George Eyre, entered the Indian army
7. Kathleen

== Publications ==
- Gazetter of Dera Ghazi Khan
- A Manual of the Beluchi language
- A History of the Marri-Beluch Tribe
- The Forward Policy and its Results, 1900
