= Alexander Tucker (civil servant) =

British civil servant (1861–1941)

Alexander Lauzun Pendock Tucker CIE (1861 – 1941) was an administrator in British India. He served as the Chief Commissioner of Balochistan.

== Biography ==
Born 1861, Tucker was the eldest son of Henry Pendock St George Tucker, a judge in India who retired in 1876. He was educated at Winchester College. He matriculated at Balliol College, Oxford in October 1880, and joined the Indian Civil Service that year.

Tucker arrived in India on 28 December 1882, and served in Bombay as assistant collector. In 1891, he acted as under sec. to government of India, foreign dept. He was secretary for Berar in October 1893, and political agent for Haraoti and Tonk in December 1895. He was appointed a Companion of the Order of the Indian Empire (CIE) in November 1901.

In 1908, Tucker marries Eva Beatrice Tatton, younger daughter of Thomas Egerton Tatton of Wythenshawe Hall, Cheshire. He died in 1941, aged 79 or 80.

== Works ==
- Sir Robert. G. Sandeman, K.C.S.I., Peaceful Conqueror of Baluchistan.

Political offices
Preceded by John Ramsay	Chief Commissioner of Balochistan; 23 January 1905 – 2 April 1907	Succeeded by Sir Arthur Henry McMahon
