= John Ramsay (commissioner) =

Administrator in British India (1862–1942)

- Born: 1862
- Died: 1942 (aged 79–80)

Sir John Ramsay KCSI CIE (5 December 1862 – 2 March 1942) was an administrator in British India. He served as the Chief Commissioner of Balochistan five times.

Political offices
Preceded by Charles Edward Yate	Chief Commissioner of Balochistan; 4 November 1904 – 4 November 1904	Succeeded by Alexander Lauzun Pendock Tucker
Preceded by Sir Arthur Henry McMahon	Chief Commissioner of Balochistan; 25 April 1911 – 21 October 1912	Succeeded by Charles Archer
Preceded by Charles Archer	Chief Commissioner of Balochistan; 14 November 1912 – 2 April 1914	Succeeded by Charles Archer
Preceded by Charles Archer	Chief Commissioner of Balochistan; 23 May 1914 – 15 June 1915	Succeeded by Charles Archer
Preceded by Charles Archer	Chief Commissioner of Balochistan; 5 July 1915 – 5 December 1917	Succeeded by Henry Robert Conway Dobbs
