= Henry Dobbs =

British civil servant and colonial administrator

Sir Henry Dobbs GBE KCSI KCMG KCIE FRGS

High Commissioner and Consul-General for Iraq
- In office 1923–1929

Foreign Secretary to the Government of India
- In office 1919–1920

Chief Commissioner of Baluchistan
- In office 5 December 1917 – 1 September 1919

Personal details
- Born: Henry Robert Conway Dobbs; 26 August 1871
- Died: 30 May 1934 (aged 62)

Sir Henry Robert Conway Dobbs (26 August 1871 – 30 May 1934) was an administrator in British India and High Commissioner of Iraq.

== Career ==
Dobbs was educated at Winchester College and Brasenose College, Oxford. He joined the Indian Civil Service in 1892, and in 1903 he was sent to repair boundary pillars erected by the Afghan Boundary Commission along the Russo-Afghan border. After several other posts, he served as the Chief Commissioner of Balochistan 1917–1919. Dobbs was the British Representative on the Kabul Mission in January 1921, during which he met with Afghan Foreign Minister Mahmud Tarzi to discuss Anglo-Afghan relations.

The result was the Anglo-Afghan Treaty of 22 November 1921, which confirmed the Indo-Afghan border, established diplomatic ties between London and Kabul, and defined special trade agreements. He later served as High Commissioner to the Kingdom of Iraq from 1923 to 1929, the longest time this position was held by anyone during the course of the Iraq Mandate.

== Honours ==
He was appointed a Companion of the Order of the Indian Empire (CIE) on 31 May 1905 for his services in Afghanistan, and appointed a Companion of the Order of the Star of India (CSI) on 18 August 1916 for meritorious war services. In the 1921 New Year Honours, he was knighted as a Knight Commander of the Order of the Indian Empire (KCIE),

He was promoted to Knight Commander of the Order of the Star of India (KCSI) in 1923, appointed a Knight Commander of the Order of St. Michael and St. George (KCMG) in the 1925 Birthday Honours and a Knight Grand Cross of the Order of the British Empire (GBE) on 1 March 1929.

== Publications ==
- A monograph on the pottery and glass industries of the North-Western Provinces and Oudh, North-Western Provinces and Oudh Government Press, Allahabad, 1895.
- Korah (A drama, in verse), Grant Richards, London, 1903.

Political offices
Preceded by John Ramsay	Chief Commissioner of Balochistan; 5 December 1917 – 1 September 1919	Succeeded by Armine Brereton Dew
Diplomatic posts
Preceded by Sir Percy Cox	High Commissioner for Iraq and Commander-in-Chief therein 1923–1929	Succeeded by Sir Gilbert Clayton
