= Henry Wylie =

British administrator

Major-General Henry Wylie CSI (24 July 1844 – 5 October 1918) was a British Indian Army officer. He served as the acting Chief Commissioner of Balochistan in 1899 and as British Resident at Nepal, 1891–1900.

== Biography ==
Wylie was born in Calcutta, where his father, MacLeod Wylie, was a judge.

He was commissioned an ensign on 4 October 1861, and a lieutenant on 4 October 1862, and served in the Ambela campaign in 1863 (medal and clasp), then in Bhutan in 1865, Abyssinia in 1868, and against the Hassars in 1868. Following promotion to captain on 13 December 1870, he went on special duty to Balochistan, and was assistant to the Governor-General's Agent there from 1875 to 1878.

After serving in the Second Anglo-Afghan War 1878-1880 (where he received the medal), he was employed as Chief Political Officer in Peshin, and was with General Sir Robert Phayre's column, for which he was twice mentioned in despatches, received the medal and was appointed a Companion of the Order of the Star of India (CSI). He received the brevet rank of major on 1 July 1881, but shortly after received the substantive rank of major on 4 October 1881. Later be became assistant to the Resident in Mysore, then secretary to the Commissioner of Coorg, Political Agent in Jhallawar 1885–1887, and following promotion to lieutenant-colonel on 4 October 1887 he was in Bhopal. He was Resident in Nepal 1891–1900, during which he was promoted to colonel on 29 August 1893, and to major-general on 10 October 1899. He acted as Agent to the Governor-General of India for Baluchistan occasionally before his retirement in April 1900.

Wylie was twice married, and left a son and two daughters. One of his grandsons is Charles Wylie.

He died at his home in Farnham Common, Buckinghamshire.

Political offices
Preceded by Hugh Shakespear Barnes	Chief Commissioner of Balochistan; 12 April 1899 – 21 December 1899	Succeeded by Hugh Shakespear Barnes
