= Tribes of the Hindoo Koosh =

Book by John Biddulph

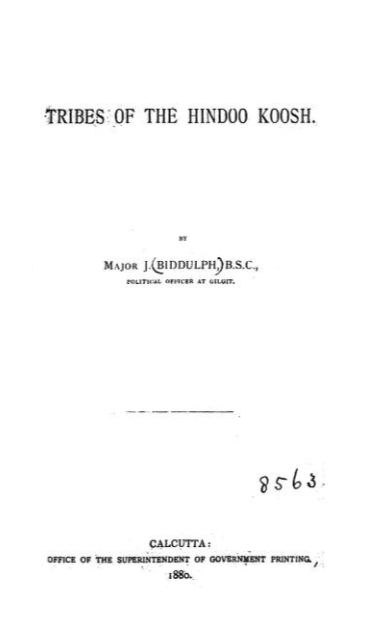
- Title page for Tribes of the Hindoo Koosh (1880)
- Author: Colonel John Biddulph
- Language: English
- Subject: Languages, Social Customs
- Published: 1880
- Publication place: Calcutta, India
- Media type: (Hardback)

Tribes of the Hindoo Koosh is a book written by Colonel John Biddulph and originally published in 1880. The book was one of the first written in English which provided an insight into the languages, social customs and general characteristics of the many tribes that inhabited the Hindu Kush.
