= William Blenkins =

William Bazett Goodwin Blenkins ISO (4 July 1852 - 21 May 1942) was a commissioner and senior figure in the Cape Colony Government.

Born in Bombay in 1852, he was the youngest of two sons of an army Major, similarly named William Bazett Gordon Blenkins (C.B.), who was originally from St Helena, and his second wife Annie Jarvis, daughter of the Cape Town Mayor Hercules Jarvis. Confusingly his older brother was also similarly named, Bazett Jarvis Blenkins.

He served as magistrate for several parts of southern Africa in his youth. He later came to hold a range of concurrent positions in the Colony's civil service - from Chief of Police in the capital to commissioner of several boards. In 1902 he was Civil Commissioner, Resident Magistrate and Registrar of Deeds in King Williams Town. On 14 November 1883 he married Mary Elizabeth Chapman and, after her death on 7 September 1912, he married Maria Johanna Emerentia Clack (d.1940). He was resident at Beaufort Villa, Kenilworth. He died in Cape Town on 21 May 1942.
