= Gilbert Clayton =

British Army intelligence officer and colonial administrator (1875–1929)

Brigadier-General Sir Gilbert Clayton KCMG KBE CB
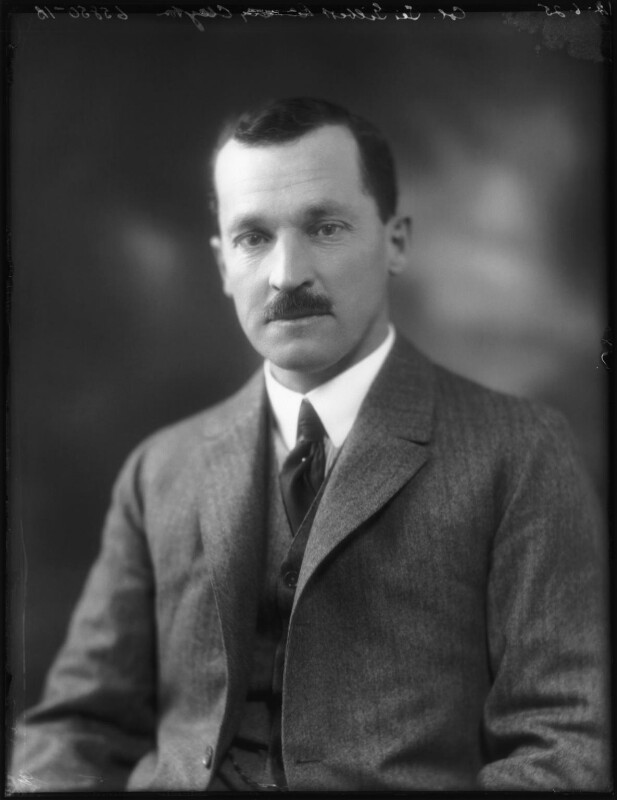
- Clayton in 1925

High Commissioner for Iraq and Commander-in-Chief therein
- In office 11 April 1929 – 11 September 1929
- Preceded by: Sir Henry Dobbs
- Succeeded by: Sir Francis Humphrys

Personal details
- Born: 6 April 1875 Ryde, Isle of Wight
- Died: 11 September 1929 (aged 54) Baghdad, Iraq
- Occupation: British Army intelligence officer and colonial administrator

Military service
- Allegiance: United Kingdom
- Branch/service: British Army
- Rank: Brigadier-General
- Unit: Royal Artillery
- Battles/wars: Mahdist War; First World War
- Awards: Knight Commander of the Order of St Michael and St George; Knight Commander of the Order of the British Empire; Companion of the Order of the Bath

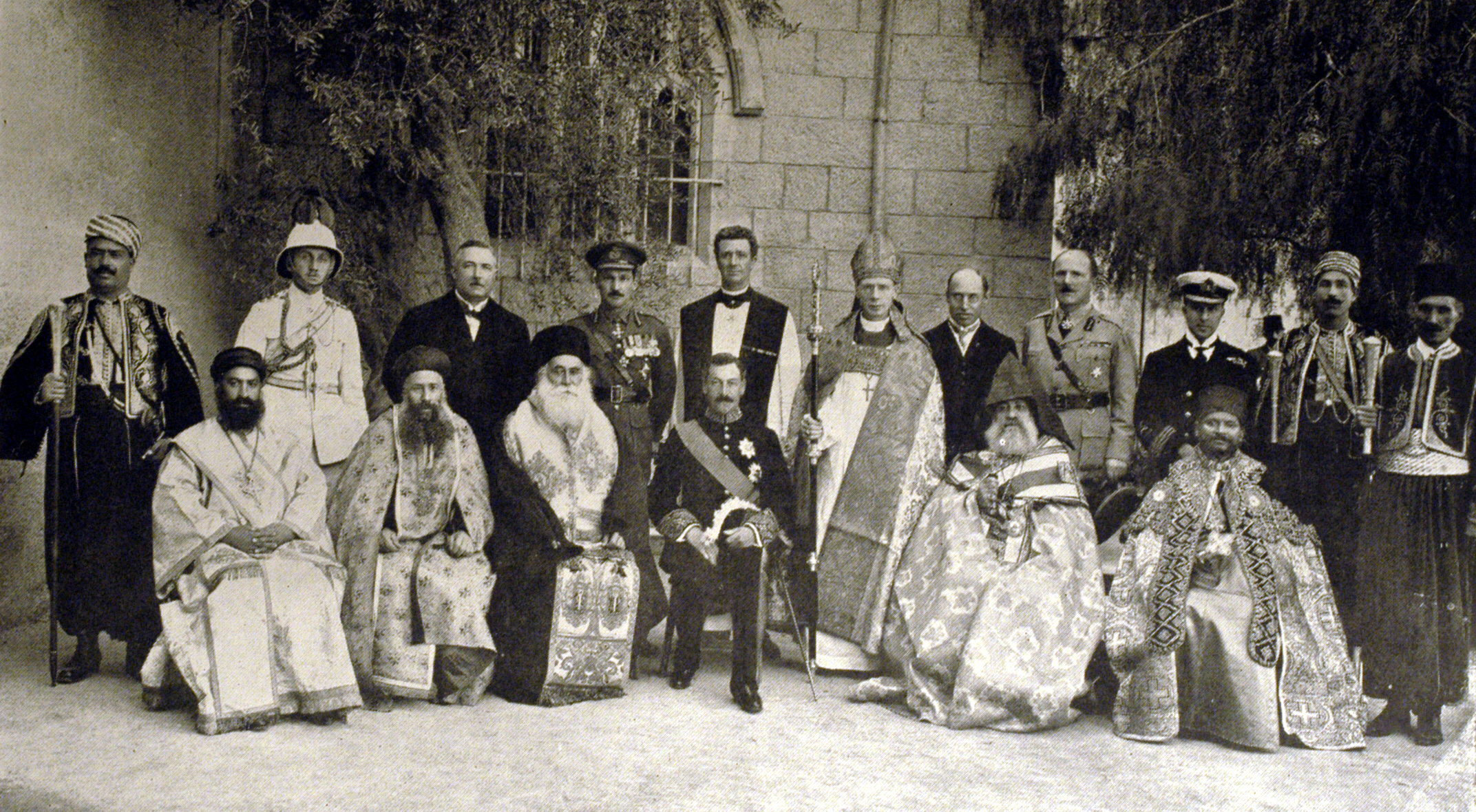
Clayton (standing, fourth to left), at meeting with church leaders in Jerusalem, 1922

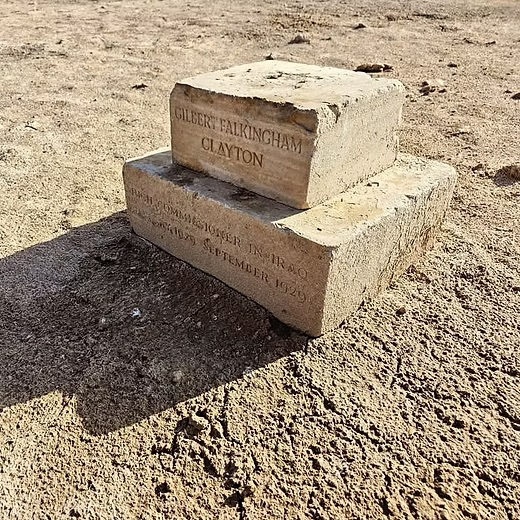
Grave of Sir Gilbert Clayton Ma'Asker Cemetery Baghdad Iraq 2025

Brigadier-General Sir Gilbert Falkingham Clayton, KCMG, KBE, CB (6 April 1875 – 11 September 1929) was a British Army intelligence officer and colonial administrator, who worked in several countries in the Middle East in the early 20th century. In Egypt, during World War I as an intelligence officer, he supervised those who worked to start the Arab Revolt. In Palestine, Arabia and Mesopotamia, in the 1920s as a colonial administrator, he helped negotiate the borders of the countries that later became Israel, Jordan, Syria, Saudi Arabia and Iraq.

== Early life ==
Born in Ryde, Isle of Wight, Clayton was the eldest son of Lieutenant Colonel William Lewis Nicholl Clayton, and his wife, Maria Martha Pilkington. He was educated at the Isle of Wight College and the Royal Military Academy, Woolwich. He became an officer in the Royal Artillery in October 1895. He was part of the forces sent to the Sudan during the closing stages of the Mahdist War, seeing action in the Battle of Atbara (1898). He then served in Egypt, but in 1910 he retired and left the army to work as private secretary to the Governor-General of Sudan, Sir Francis Reginald Wingate.

== First World War ==
During the First World War, Clayton worked in army intelligence in Cairo, Egypt, serving in the newly formed Arab Bureau. In 1914, he sent a secret memorandum to Lord Kitchener, suggesting that Britain work with the Arabs to overthrow their Ottoman rulers. He became Director of Intelligence, and was promoted to temporary brigadier general and later to lieutenant general, dated 7 October 1917. In this role, he worked with many of the people that helped to trigger the Arab Revolt against the Ottoman Turks.

In Seven Pillars of Wisdom (1935), T. E. Lawrence described Clayton's role as chief of British intelligence in Egypt between 1914 and 1917:

Clayton made the perfect leader for such a band of wild men as we were. He was calm, detached, clear-sighted, of unconscious courage in assuming responsibility. He gave an open run to his subordinates. His own views were general, like his knowledge: and he worked by influence rather than by loud direction. It was not easy to descry his influence. He was like water, or permeating oil, creeping silently and insistently through everything. It was not possible to say where Clayton was and was not, and how much really belonged to him.

— T. E. Lawrence, Seven Pillars of Wisdom (1935)

== Colonial administration ==
Following the war, Clayton worked as an advisor for the Egyptian government, and then in the colonial administration of the British Mandate of Palestine. He was Civil Secretary of Palestine from 1922 to 1925, at which point he was briefly acting High Commissioner. He was then involved in negotiations with Arab rulers for the Treaty of Jeddah (1927); he was an envoy to the Sultan Ibn Saud of Nejd, tasked to undertake a mission to Yemen to negotiate with its ruler Imam Yahya Muhammad Hamid ed-Din. From 1928, he was High Commissioner for the British Mandate of Mesopotamia (Iraq). Clayton was involved in negotiations for a new Anglo-Iraqi Treaty. His unexpected death, from a heart attack, delayed matters, but the new treaty was eventually signed in 1930.

== Personal life ==
Clayton's younger brother, Iltyd Nicholl Clayton, was also a British Army officer.

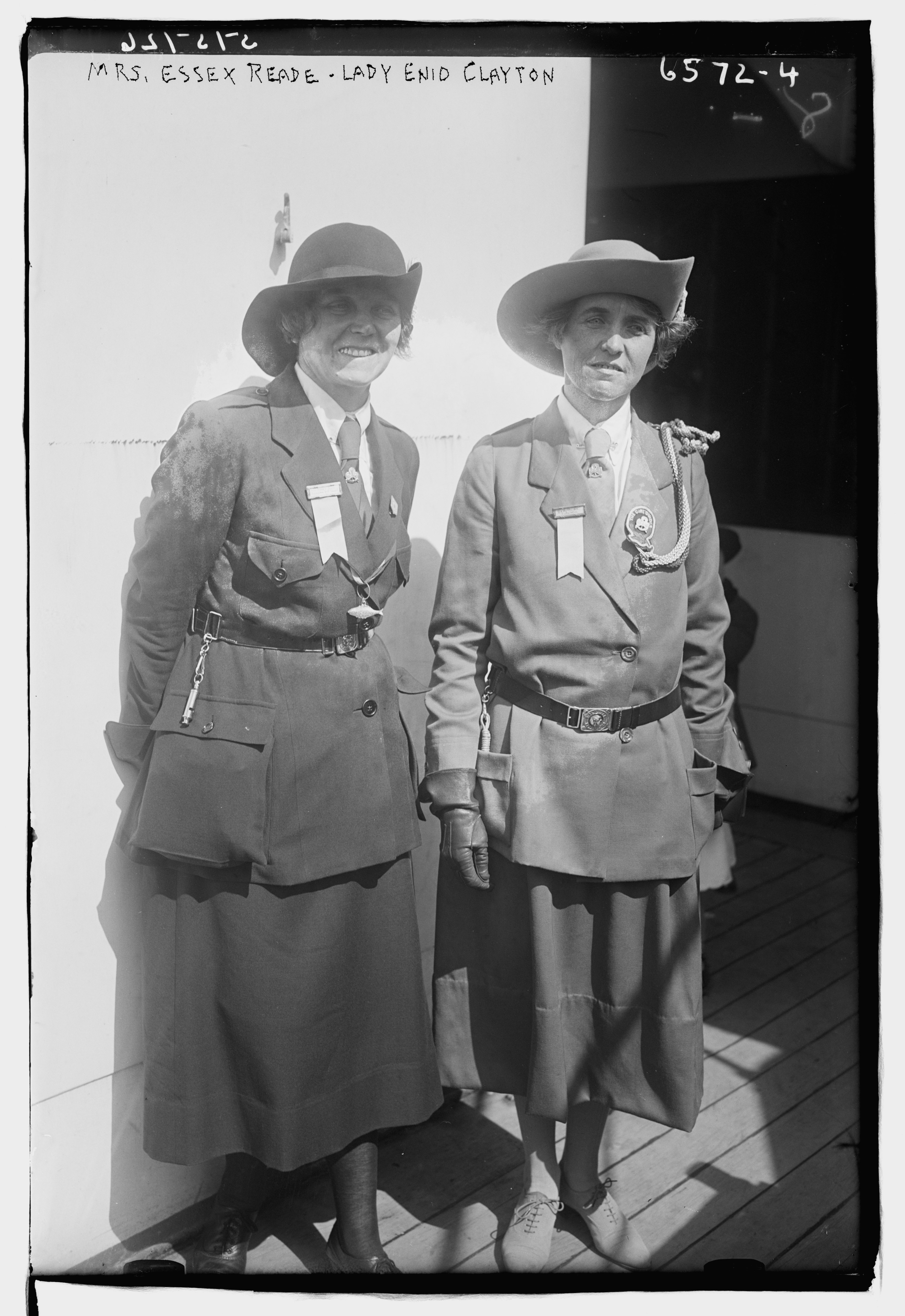
Lady Enid Clayton, on right

In 1912, Clayton married Enid Caroline Thorowgood in London, with the ceremony being conducted by Llewellyn Henry Gwynne, the Bishop of Khartoum. They had five children, but, as the family accompanied him to his appointments, two of them died, one from pneumonic plague. His daughter Patience (later Marshall), who suffered from bubonic plague as a child, studied at Cambridge and went on to gain an OBE for her work as a magistrate and with young offenders. His son John went into medicine, becoming the doctor for Eton College and "Surgeon Apothecary to the Royal Household at Windsor", in which capacity he treated the Queen Mother when she got a fishbone stuck in her throat. in 1982. His other son, Sam, married Lady Mary Leveson-Gower, daughter of the Queen Mother's sister Rose Leveson-Gower, Countess Granville; their son is Bertie Clayton and daughter is Rosie Stancer, polar explorer.

On 11 September 1929, Gilbert Clayton succumbed to the consequences of a heart attack in Baghdad at the age of 54. He was buried with full military honours at the Ma'Asker Al Raschid RAF Cemetery. His widow and their three remaining children moved back to England, first to Doddington, Lincolnshire, and then to a grace and favour flat at Hampton Court.

== Positions ==
Clayton held the following positions:

- 1914–1916 – Director of Military Intelligence, British Army Headquarters, Cairo
- 1916–1917 – Brigadier General, General Staff, Military Operations, Hejaz
- 1917–1919 – Chief Political Officer, Egyptian Expeditionary Force. Military Governor, Palestine (O.E.T.A. South)
- 1919–1922 – Adviser to the Egyptian Ministry of the Interior
- 1922–1925 – Civil Secretary to the Palestine Government
- 1925–1925 – Acting British High Commissioner for Palestine (British Mandate of Palestine)
- 1925–1928 – Envoy to the Sultan Ibn Saud of Nejd
- 1926 – Special Envoy to Yahya ibn Muhammad Hamid ad-Din, Imam of the Yemen
- 1927 – Special Envoy to Rome
- 1929 – British High Commissioner to the Kingdom of Iraq (British Mandate of Mesopotamia)

== Honours ==
- 1914 – Third Class of the Imperial Ottoman Order of the Medjidieh
- 1915 – Companion of the Order of St. Michael and St. George
- 1916 – Officer of the Legion of Honour
- 1917 – Companion of the Order of the Bath
- 1917 – 2nd Class, Order of St. Stanislaus
- 1917 - Officer of the Order of St Maurice and St Lazarus
- 1919 – Knight Commander of the Order of the British Empire
- 1921 - Grand Cordon of the Order of the Nile
- 1926 – Knight Commander of the Order of St. Michael and St. George "For services rendered in concluding agreements with the Sultan of Nejd and for the conduct of a mission to the Imam of the Yemen."
- 1929 - Officer of the Order of St John

== Bibliography ==
- Clayton, Gilbert (1929). "Arabia and the Arabs". Journal of the Royal Institute of International Affairs. 8 (1): 8–20. doi:10.2307/3014987. JSTOR 3014987.
- Collins, Robert O. (1969), An Arabian Diary, Berkeley University of California Press

Diplomatic posts
Preceded by Sir Henry Dobbs	High Commissioner for Iraq and Commander-in-Chief therein 1929	Succeeded by Sir Francis Humphrys
