= List of British resident ministers in Nepal =

A Resident of the British Empire was a government official required to take up permanent residence in another country. A representative of his government, he officially had diplomatic functions which are often seen as a form of indirect rule. From 1802 to 1923 there were twenty British residents in Nepal who directly or indirectly played a significant role in the Nepalese politics. The establishment of the British Residency in Nepal is seen as a direct effect of the eighth point of the Sugauli Treaty between the Kingdom of Nepal and the East India Company in 1816. The title of Resident was officially changed to Envoy after the Nepal–Britain Treaty of 1923.

For British representatives in Nepal since 1924, see: List of ambassadors of the United Kingdom to Nepal.

== List of Residents ==
Name	Portrait	Tenure
William Hunter Douglas Knox		1802–1803
Vacant		1803–1816
John Peter Boileau (acting)		1816
Edward Gardner		1816–1829
Brian Houghton Hodgson		1829–1831
Thomas Herbert Maddock		1831–1833
Brian Houghton Hodgson		1833–1843
Henry Montgomery Lawrence		1843–1845
John Russell Colvin		1845–1847
Charles Thoresby		1847–1850
James Claudius Erskine		1850–1852
George Ramsay		1852–1867
Richard Charles Lawrence		1867–1872
Charles Edward Ridgway Girdlestone		1872–1888
Edward Law Durand		1888–1891
Henry Wylie		1891–1899
Archibald Mungo Muir		1899
William Loch		1899–1900
Thomas Caldwell Pears		1900–1902
Charles Withers Ravenshaw		1902–1905
John Manners Smith		1905–1916
Steuart Farquharson Bayley		1916–1918
William Frederick Travers O'Connor		1918–1923

== See also ==
- Brian Houghton Hodgson
- Henry Montgomery Lawrence
- Sugauli Treaty
- British ambassadors to Nepal since 1923
