= John Biddulph =

British soldier, author and naturalist

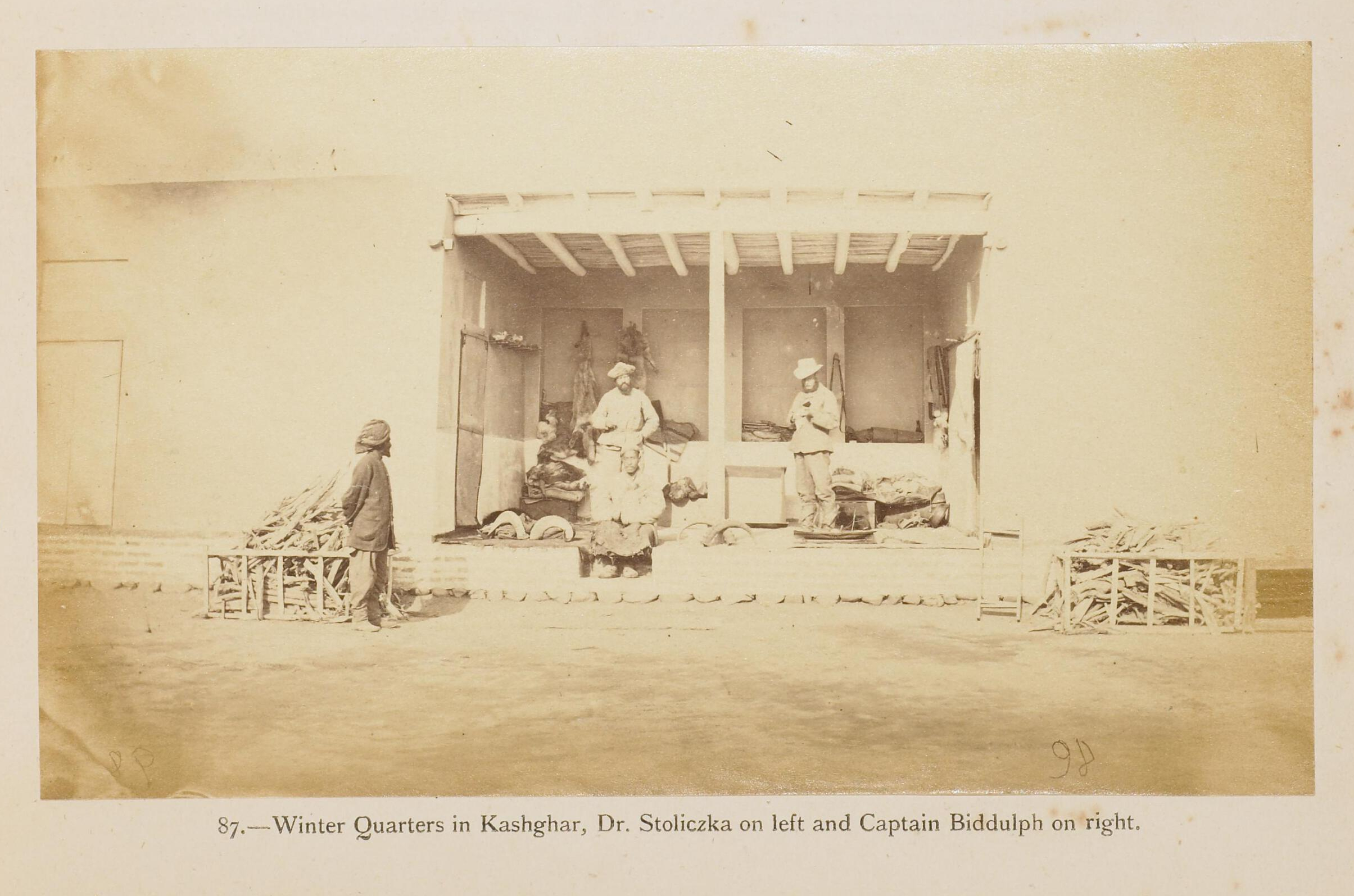
Captain John Biddulph (with hat on right) with Ferdinand Stoliczka in 1873

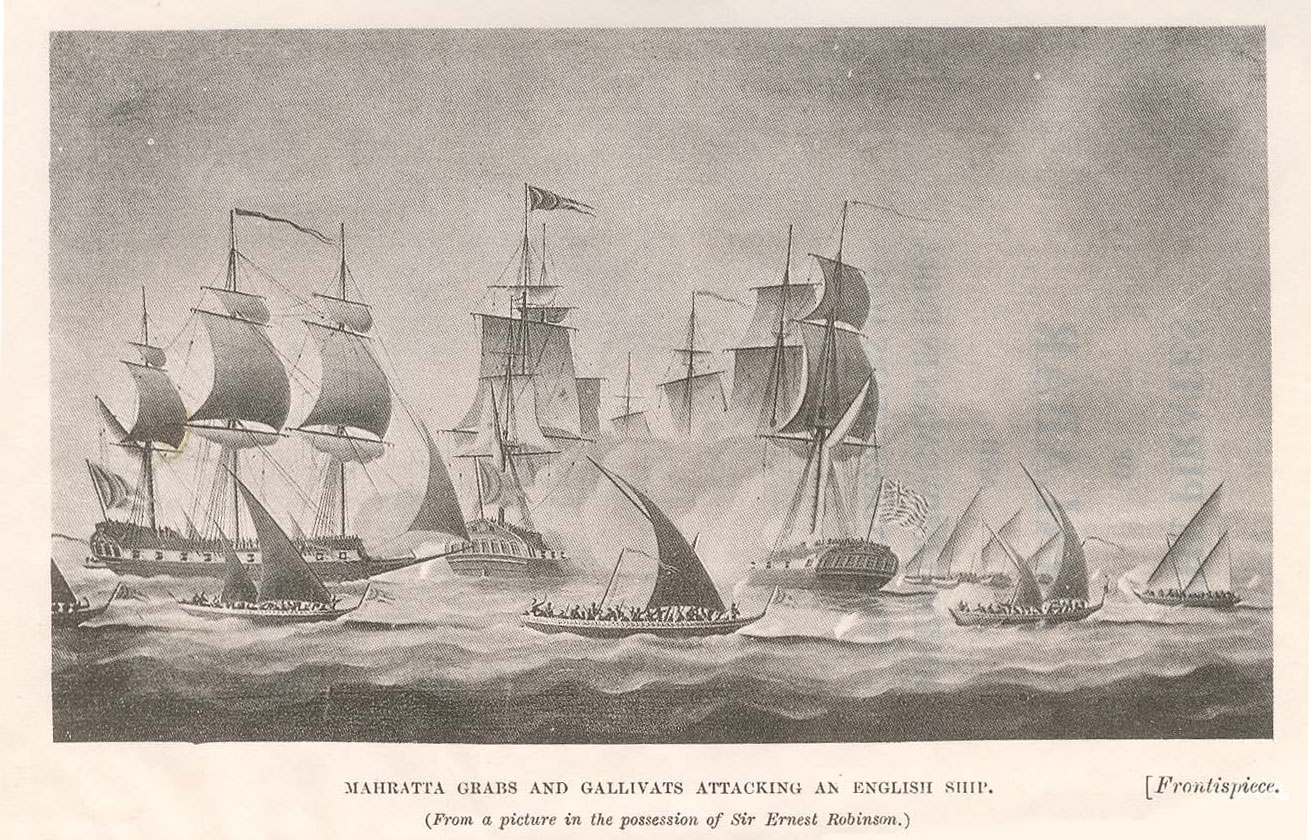
Frontispiece of The Pirates Of Malabar, and An Englishwoman In India: Maratha Gurabs and Galbats attacking an English-Ship

Colonel John Biddulph (25 July 1840 – 24 December 1921) was a British soldier, author and naturalist who served in the government of British India.

Biddulph was born in 1840, and was the third son of Robert Biddulph. He was educated at Westminster School, and at the age of 18 joined the 19th Lancers and proceeded to India where he served in Awadh during the Indian Rebellion of 1857. Afterwards, he joined the political department of the government of British India. Between 1873 and 1874 he accompanied Thomas Douglas Forsyth, Thomas E. Gordon, Henry Walter Bellew, Ferdinand Stoliczka, Henry Trotter, and R. A. Champman on the Second Yarkand Mission – an expedition across the Himalayas to Chinese Turkestan. During this journey, Biddulph collected numerous specimens of birds and mammals, including an unknown species of Podoces which was later named in his honour by Allan Octavian Hume as Podoces biddulphi.

In 1877 Biddulph was posted at Gilgit, in the extreme north-western corner of Kashmir, and remained there until 1881. During this period he corresponded on ornithology with Hume and his observations and research in this region were published in two papers in the Ibis. After holding many posts as British Resident at various princely states and serving for four years on the staff of the Viceroy of India, Lord Northbrook, Biddulph retired from the service in 1896. He died on 24 December 1921 in Grey Court, London, aged 81.

== Writings ==
Biddulph wrote several works about India and about the history of the British presence there including biographies of Stringer Lawrence and Joseph François Dupleix. These books and his Tribes of the Hindoo Koosh are listed as references for several articles in the Encyclopædia Britannica Eleventh Edition.

- Tribes of the Hindoo Koosh, 1880
- The Nineteenth And Their Times, 1899
- Stringer Lawrence, The Father Of The Indian Army, 1901
- The Pirates Of Malabar, and An Englishwoman In India...,1907
- Dupleix, 1910

Political offices
Preceded by Sir Hugh Shakespear Barnes	Chief Commissioner of Balochistan; 1891	Succeeded by Sir Robert Groves Sandeman
