= Oliver St John (civil servant) =

Sir Oliver Beauchamp Coventry St John KCSI (21 March 1837 – 3 June 1891) was an administrator in British India, who took a close interest in the zoology of the region. He served as the chief commissioner of Baluchistan for ten years and was involved in the establishment of a telegraph network to India.

== Early life ==
Oliver St John was born on 21 March 1837 in Ryde, Isle of Wight. His father was Captain Oliver St John of the Madras Army and his mother was Helen née Young (widow of Henry Anson Nutt). He studied at the East India Company's Military College at Addiscombe (1855–57), and joined the Bengal Engineers on 12 December 1856.

== Career ==
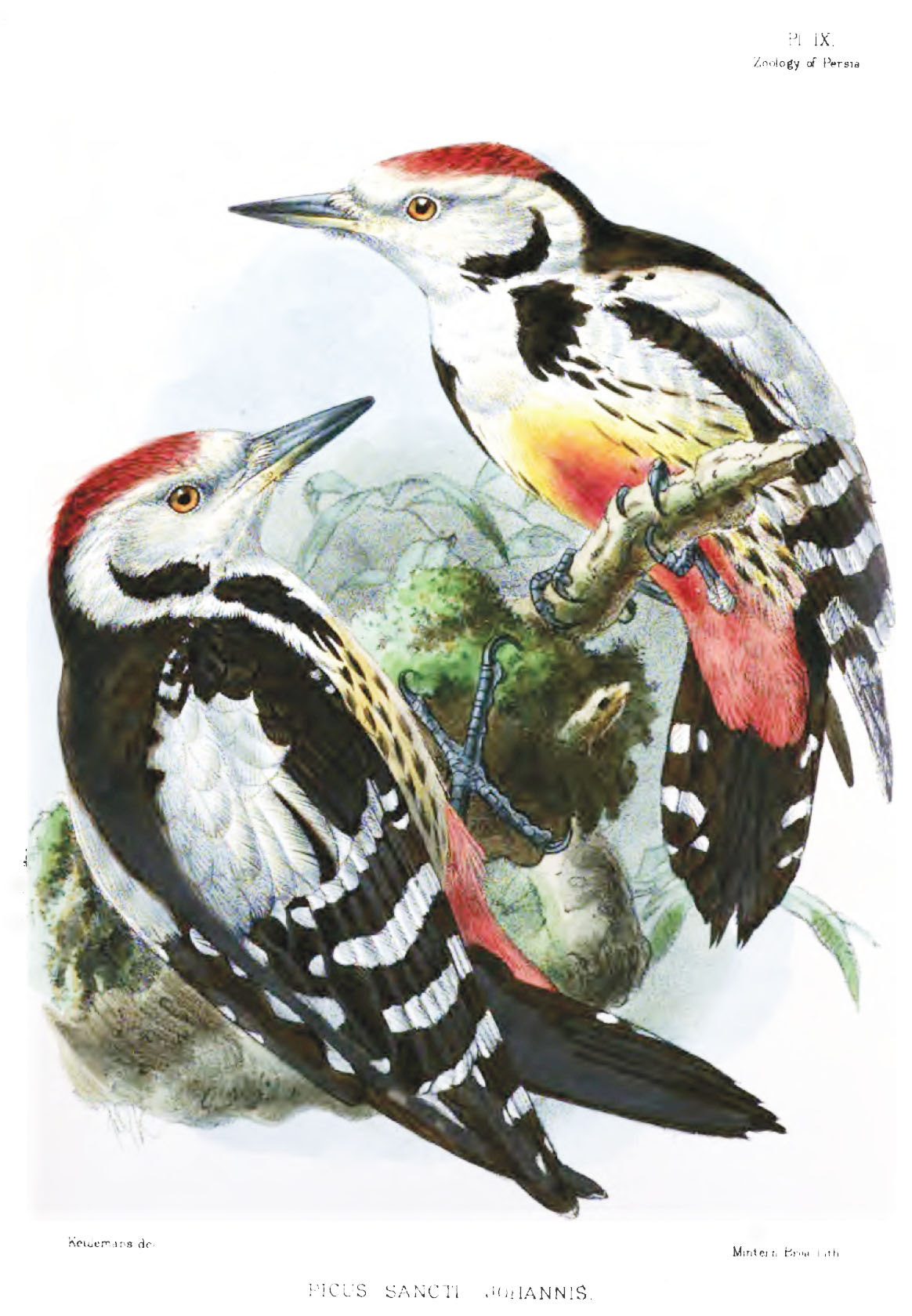
Picus sanctijohannis, named after St John by William Thomas Blanford

After serving in the United Provinces of Agra and Oudh in the public works department, St John volunteered for work in Persia under Lieutenant-Colonel Patrick Stewart of the Royal Engineers. This mission was mainly to establish a telegraph line between Persia and India including a cable in the Persian Gulf and a land cable line for telegraphic link to Bosporus. Stewart and his brother Champain had already worked on a survey in Turkey. St John worked on the expedition under Captain Murdoch Smith, RE.

He later took charge of the line from Teheran to Bashahr (March 1866), and during this time a second telegraph line was added. He went home in May 1867 and he was then sent to Abyssinia to organize telegraph lines for the war. This line was 200 miles from the coast and the work led to his promotion. Towards the end of 1868 he returned to Persia and he remained here till 1871 with a break in September 1869 when he married Janette, daughter of James Ormond, of Abingdon, Berkshire. In October 1871, St John was sent to Baluchistan for the survey of the Perso-Kelat frontier. He returned to England in October 1872 and worked on preparing maps at the India Office. These maps were based on longitudes of the Persian telegraph stations fixed in co-operation with General James Walker of the Indian Trigonometric Survey, Captain William Pierson, RE, and Lt Stiffe, IN.

St John published his notes in the Narrative of a Journey through Baluchistan and Southern Persia (1876). He returned to India in 1875 and became principal of the Mayo College in Ajmer. After August 1878 he became part of the staff of Sir Neville Chamberlain's mission to Kabul. He then became chief political officer to the Kandahar Field Force, becoming later Resident in Kandahar. An attempt was made on his life during a trip in southern Afghanistan on 10 January 1879. He was also posted on special duty in Kashmir (January 1883), acting resident in Hyderabad (April–July 1884), resident in Kashmir (August 1884), agent to the governor-general at Baroda (December 1887), resident at Mysore and chief commissioner in Coorg (January 1889). He was later recalled from southern India to Baluchistan. He died in Quetta of pneumonia after an attack of influenza and was buried at Quetta.

== Natural history ==
During all his time in Abyssinia, Persia and Baluchistan St John took a keen interest in natural history and hunting. His personal notes from the Persian border commission expedition of 1871 are included in the zoology report of the expedition prepared by William Thomas Blanford. Blanford's own account includes notes on St John's experiences with lions in Persia, while another account is provided of him chasing a tiger that threatened a colleague. St John also corresponded with ornithologists in the region, including Allan Octavian Hume.

He was a member of the Royal Geological Society and the Zoological Society of London and sent many animals back for the collections, including a live bactrian camel. A species of woodpecker (Picus sanctijohannis, now considered a subspecies of Dendrocoptes medius) and a species of snake (Fowlea sanctijohannis) are both named after him.

== Death ==
St John died on 3 June 1891 in Quetta of pneumonia after an attack of influenza during a recurrence of the 1889–90 pandemic.

Political offices
Preceded by -	Chief Commissioner of Balochistan; 1877–1887	Succeeded by Sir Robert Groves Sandeman
Preceded by Sir Hugh Shakespear Barnes	Chief Commissioner of Balochistan (acting); 1891	Succeeded by Sir Hugh Shakespear Barnes
