= Robert Groves Sandeman =

British officer (1835–1892)

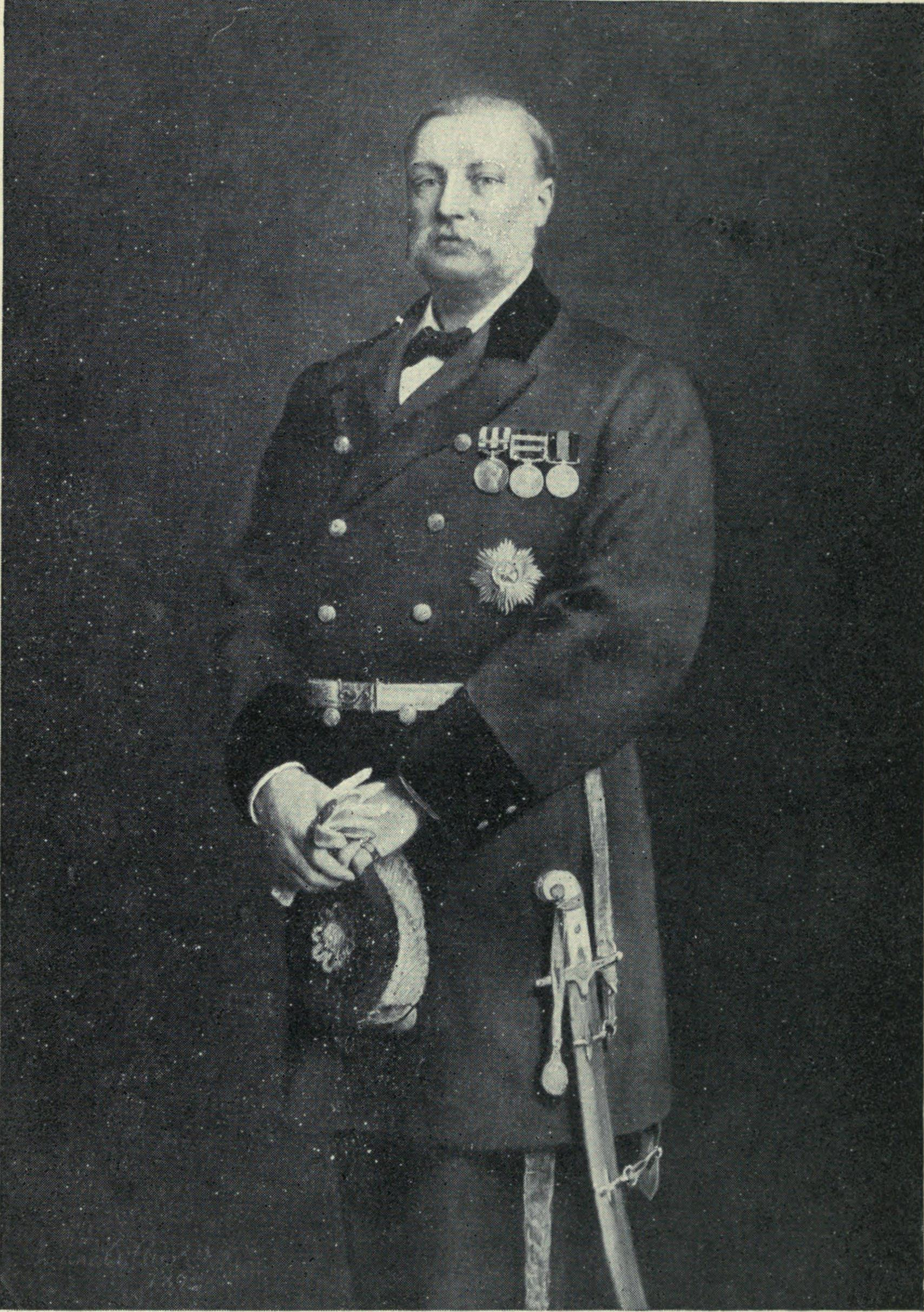
- Born: 25 February 1835; Perth, Scotland
- Died: 29 January 1892 (aged 56); Bela, Lasbela, British India (now Bela, Balochistan, Pakistan)
- Occupations: British Indian Army officer and colonial administrator
- Relatives: Walter Massy-Greene (nephew)

Sir Robert Groves Sandeman, KCSI (1835–1892) was a British Indian Army officer and colonial administrator. He was known for his activities in Balochistan, where he introduced a system of "tribal pacification" that endured until the partition of India in 1947.

== Early life ==
Sandeman was born on 25 February 1835, the son of General Robert Turnbull Sandeman. He was educated at Perth and University of St Andrews, and joined the 33rd Bengal Infantry in 1856. When that regiment was disarmed at Phillour by General John Nicholson during the Indian Rebellion of 1857, he took part in the final capture of Lucknow as adjutant of the 11th Bengal Lancers. After the suppression of the Mutiny he was appointed to the Punjab Commission by Sir John Lawrence.

== Career ==
In 1866 he was appointed district officer of Dera Ghazi Khan, and there first showed his capacity in dealing with the Baluch tribes. He was the first to break through the close-border system of Lord Lawrence by extending British influence to the independent tribes beyond the border. In his hands this policy worked admirably, owing to his tact in managing the tribesmen and his genius for control.

In February 1871, he was given political control over the warring Marri, Bugti and Mazari tribes of the Sulaiman Hills at the Mithankot conference between the then governments of Punjab and Sindh provinces.

=== Sandemanization ===
In 1876, with the help of Nawab Sir Imam Baksh Khan Mazari of Rojhan, he negotiated the Treaty of Kalat with the Khan of Kalat, which subsequently governed relations between Kalat and the government. He became agent to the governor-general of Balochistan in 1877, an office which he held until his death.

Sandeman introduced an innovative system of tribal pacification in Balochistan, informally termed 'Sandemanization', that was in effect from 1877 to 1947. He gave financial allowances to tribal chiefs who enforced control, and used British military force only when necessary. However, the Government of India generally opposed his Forward Policy methods and refused to allow it to operate in India's North West Frontier. Historians have long debated its scope and effectiveness in his mostly peaceful spread of Imperial influence.

=== Second Afghan War and aftermath ===
During the Second Anglo-Afghan War in 1878 his influence over the tribesmen was of the utmost importance, since it enabled him to keep intact the line of communications with Kandahar, and to control the tribes after the British disaster at Maiwand. For these services he was made K.C.S.I. in 1879. He received the substantive rank of lieutenant-colonel on 8 February 1882. In 1889 he occupied the Zhob valley, a strategic advantage which opened the Gomal Pass through the Waziri country to caravan traffic. Sandeman's system was not so well suited to the Pashtun as to his Baluch neighbours. But in Balochistan he was a pioneer, a pacificator and a successful administrator, who converted the region from a state of complete anarchy into a province as orderly as any in British India.

== Legacy and evaluation ==
Sandeman died at Bela, the capital of Las Bela state, on 29 January 1892. Walter Massy-Greene, who became a cabinet minister in Australia, was a nephew by his sister Julia.

Recent scholarship in postcolonial studies and on colonial Balochistan has disputed the overtly laudatory account of Sandeman's life and career as expounded in books such as Tucker's "Sir Robert G. Sandeman: Peaceful Conqueror of Balochistan" and Bruce's "The Forward Policy and its Results". At a conceptual level, the idea of colonial rulers bringing order to the colonized territory has been questioned by authors such as Edward Said and Nicholas Dirks who argue that this myth resulted from a misunderstanding of (mostly unwritten) local social and cultural norms. It was the product of an effort to make alien peoples and territories governable through the invention of categories of savage and civilized. In respect of colonial Balochistan, Simanti Dutta points out that Sandeman skillfully exploited an existing rift between the Baloch ruler, the Khan of Kalat, and his subordinate tribal chiefs to leverage his influence and project British power into a region which was strategically significant in the context of Anglo-Russian rivalry in Afghanistan. A careful examination of historical records suggests that there were a number of armed uprisings against British rule in Balochistan during and after Sandeman's tenure which had to be put down through the use of lethal force and imposition of crippling financial penalties on the defaulting tribes.

== Notes ==
Government offices
Preceded by New office (Sir Oliver St John acting)	Chief Commissioner of Balochistan; 1887–1889	Succeeded by Sir Harry Prendergast (acting)
Preceded by Sir Harry Prendergast (acting)	Chief Commissioner of Balochistan; 1889–1891	Succeeded by Sir Hugh Barnes
Preceded by John Biddulph (acting)	Chief Commissioner of Balochistan; 1891–1892	Succeeded by Sir Hugh Barnes (acting)
