= James Browne (Indian Army officer) =

British Indian Army general

Sir James Browne KCSI CB
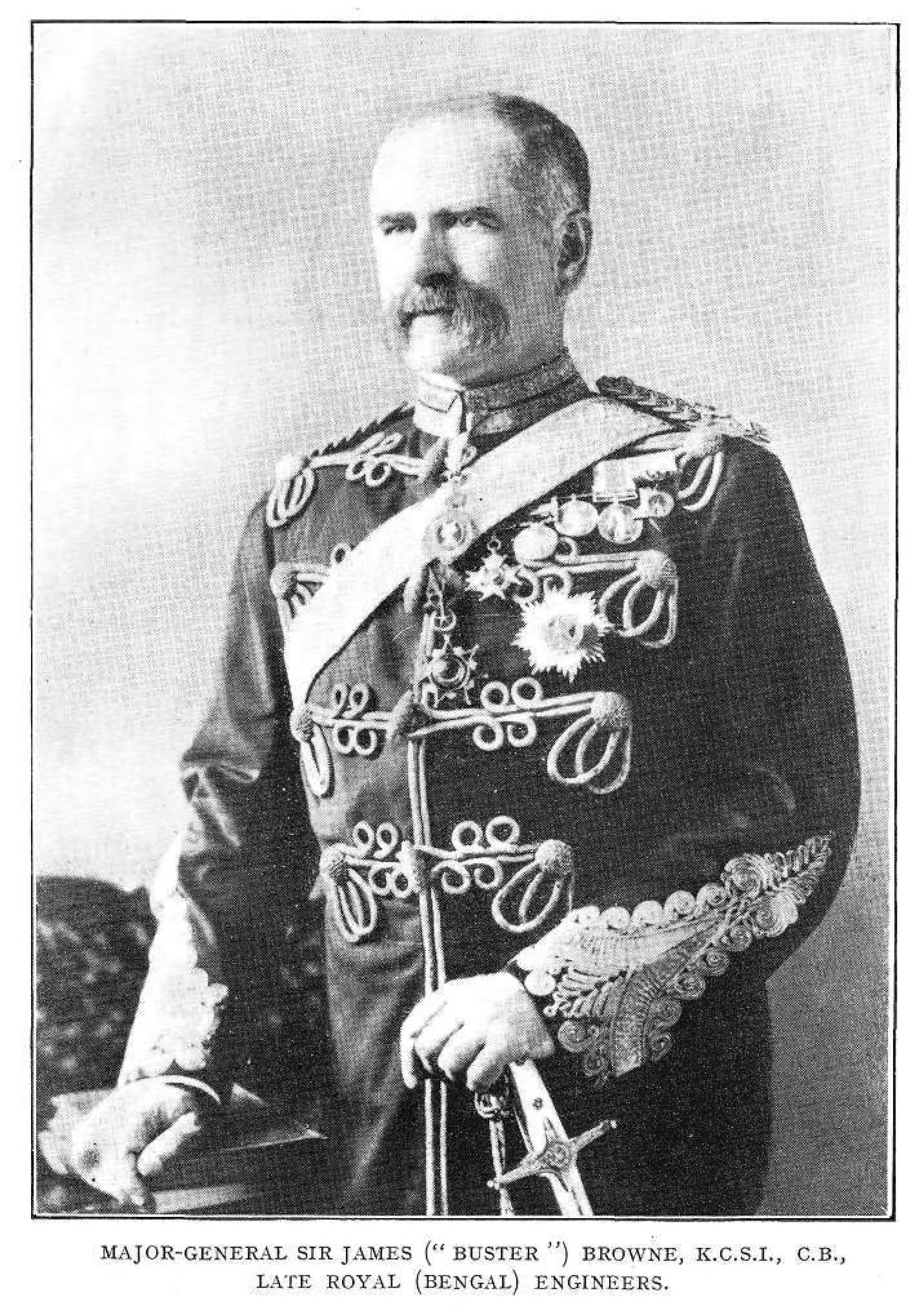
- Born: 16 September 1839; France
- Died: 13 June 1896 (aged 56); Quetta, British India
- Military career
- Allegiance: (British Raj) British India
- Branch: British Indian Army
- Rank: Major general
- Conflicts: Ambela Campaign; Second Anglo-Afghan War; Anglo-Egyptian War

Major-General Sir James Browne KCSI CB (16 September 1839 – 13 June 1896), known as "Buster Browne", was a British military engineer and administrator in British India.

== Early life ==
Browne was born in France, the son of Dr Robert Browne, a physician of Falkirk, Scotland. His father had practised medicine in Calcutta in the 1820s and 1830s, and there met his wife, who was the daughter of his patient, a Dutch merchant whose own English wife had recently died.

He was educated in France and Germany and at Cheltenham College. He entered the East India Company's Military College at Addiscombe in February 1856, and received a commission in the Bengal Engineers on 11 December 1857. He arrived in India in December 1859.

== Career ==
He served in the expedition against the Mahsud Waziris in 1860, being mentioned in dispatches, and in 1863 in the Ambela Campaign, when he was three times mentioned. During the Ambela Campaign he was frequently employed as an interpreter, having become the first officer to pass examinations in Pashtoo.

After the Campaign and until 1865, Browne became Executive Engineer of the Kohat Division employed with building forts. Thereafter he spent some months at Thomason College before returning to the Punjab as Executive Engineer at Lahore. He subsequently spent three years at Kangra where he worked on the construction of 120 miles of mountain roads, and designing and building four bridges at Buneyr, Nigul, Dehree and Durom.

In 1869 he was thanked for his work with the Dalhousie Road Project, for the rapid completion of the barracks and his management of the 2,000 European soldiers working on the construction. In 1871 he went on furlough and spent two year studying railways and iron bridge work in Europe and America. He returned to India in 1873 and was employed designing iron bridges in the North-Western Provinces. In 1874 he carried out an extensive scheme of water supply for Dalhousie. In January 1875 he became superintendent of works for the building of the Indus bridge. He was praised for possessing a "rare combination of theoretical skill and practical talent". In 1876 he surveyed and laid out the first 70 miles of the railway from Sukkur to Quetta. He also worked alone to submit a reconnaissance survey of the Kacchi Plain, and Mushkaf and Bolan passes up to Quetta.

In 1877 he was promoted lieutenant-colonel, and in 1878–1879 accompanied Sir Donald Stewart as political officer during the Second Anglo-Afghan War. He took part in several engagements, was mentioned in despatches, and received the CB. At the conclusion of the war, Browne went on furlough to Britain. Whilst in England, he read a paper on "The Retention of Candahar and the Defence of the North West Frontier" to the East India Association. On his return to India he took charge of railway reconnaissance in the Central Provinces, and his services earned him the thanks of the Indian government.

In 1881 he became colonel, and in 1882 commanded the Indian engineer contingent sent to Egypt, being present at the Battle of Tel el-Kebir during the Anglo-Egyptian War. For his services in Egypt he received the 3rd class of the Osmariieh Order and the Khedives Star.

In 1884 he was appointed engineer-in-chief of the Sind–Pishin State Railway. In 1888 he was made a KCSI and in 1889 quartermaster-general for India. In 1892 he was appointed agent to the governor-general in Baluchistan, in succession to Sir Robert Groves Sandeman, his intimate experience of the Baluchis, gained during his railway work, having specially fitted him for this post.

== Personal life ==
In 1864 Browne married Alice Pierson, daughter of Charles Pierson and sister of Major William Henry Pierson.

== Death ==
Browne died suddenly in the morning of 13 June 1896 in Quetta. He was granted a state funeral, including a procession and thirteen gun salute, and buried that same evening. The cause of death was certified to be a haemorrhage from the bowels.

== Bibliography ==
- Innes, Lieut.-General J. J. McLeod (1905). The Life and Times of General Sir James Browne, R.E., K.C.B., K.C.S.I. (Buster Browne). London: John Murray.
- Vibart, H. M. (1894). Addiscombe: its heroes and men of note. Westminster: Archibald Constable. pp. 637–43. OL 23336661M.
