= Forward policy =

Set of foreign policy doctrines

A forward policy is a set of foreign policy doctrines applicable to territorial ambitions and disputes in which emphasis is placed on securing control of targeted territories by invasion and annexation or by the political creation of compliant buffer states. Such foreign policies have been used by a number of countries including Austria, France, Britain and China, to achieve their tactical aims over external countries. The term has been candidly employed as an unvarnished sobriquet for two military "forward policies" in two periods of history relating to the Central Asian border disputes in the Great Game,

The term has been used more generally to describe the promulgation of policies in specific areas for tactical reasons, such as by British women's anti-suffragism supporters from 1908 to 1914, who set out a raft of progressive policy proposals affecting women but excluding suffrage under the label of the "forward policy".

== The Great Game ==
The Great Game was a long period of dispute between the British and Russian empires from circa 1813 to 1907, reflecting British concerns about the security of its Indian empire as the empire expended southwards; and played out in competitions for strategic control of Afghanistan, Persia, the Central Asian khanates/emirates and the British trade-route to India.

In The Great Game, the forward policy, or forward school, was identified with arguments for the annexation of, or the control of foreign policy of, states and territories on the Indian border. The policy came with a number of costs: of armies deployed to secure territory, or subsidies to client states; as well as opportunity costs such as the increased risk of revolt in other parts of India should troops be moved to the frontier.

The forward policy stood in contrast with the "masterly inactivity" or "backward school" of policy, which saw the geography of the subcontinent, especially the Himalayas, as sufficient protection against Russian encroachment, and which was less risky and of lower cost.

Support for and dominancy of the two policies varied across time and place, with changes of government and circumstance. In Britain, Gladstone and the Liberals are identified with the backward school, Disraeli and the Conservatives with the forward.

Amongst India hands Lord Wellesley, an early Governor-General of India, supported the policy, as did his acolyte John Malcolm and less exalted staff such as William Moorcroft Sir Henry Rawlinson was a strong advocate of the forward policy, notably in his England and Russia in the East (1875) . Charles Metcalfe, 1st Baron Metcalfe, a member of the Supreme Council of India and later Governor General of Bengal, favoured the opportunity for consolidation offered by "masterful inactivity". Contention between the two played out at local as well as national levels: Sandeman's forward policy in Balochistan was at a complete variance with his colleague's approaches in neighbouring frontier areas.

The Anglo-Russian Convention of 1907 settled British-Russian relations by defining borders and spheres of influence sufficiently to enable Britain to bring its forward policy to an end.

== See also ==
- Forward policy (Sino-Indian conflict)
