= 1931 New Year Honours =

British royal recognitions

The 1931 New Year Honours were appointments by King George V to various orders and honours to reward and highlight good works by citizens of the United Kingdom and British Empire. They were announced on 30 December 1930.

The recipients of honours are displayed here as they were styled before their new honour, and arranged by honour, with classes (Knight, Knight Grand Cross, etc.) and then divisions (Military, Civil, etc.) as appropriate.

== United Kingdom and Colonies ==
=== Baron ===
- Sir John Scott Hindley Bt Commercial Adviser, Mines Department since 1918. For public services.
- Sir Ernest Henry Lamb CMG JP Member of Parliament for Rochester 1906-1910 arid 1910–18. Member of the City of London Corporation since 1903. For public and political services.
- Sir William Plender Bt CBE JP DL Senior Partner of Deloitte, Plender, Griffiths & Co. A past President of the Institute of Chartered Accountants. High Sheriff of Kent, 1928–29. For public services.
- Sir Ernest Rutherford OM FRS Chairman of the Advisory Council of the Committee of the Privy Council for Scientific and Industrial Research, late President of the Royal Society. For public services.

=== Privy Councillor ===
The King appointed the following to His Majesty's Most Honourable Privy Council:

- Thomas Kennedy MP Parliamentary Secretary to the Treasury since 1929. Member of Parliament for Kirkcaldy 1921-22 and since 1923.
- Herbert Stanley Morrison JP MP Minister of Transport since 1929. Member of Parliament for South Hackney 1923-24 and since 1929.
- The Honourable Sir George Halsey Perley KCMG Minister without Portfolio, Dominion of Canada.

=== Baronetcies ===
- Sir John Rose Bradford KCMG CB CBE FRCP MRCS FRS President of the Royal College of Physicians, Consulting Physician to University College Hospital.
- Ernest Ridley Debenham, A Director of Lloyds Bank and of the Royal Exchange Assurance Corporation. For services to agriculture.
- Sir Richard Arman Gregory Emeritus Professor of Astronomy, Queen's College, London. Editor of Nature.
- Sir George Ernest May KBE Secretary to the Prudential Assurance Company. Member of the Council of the Institute of Actuaries.
- George Roberts (Audax). A generous contributor to charity.

=== Knight Bachelor ===
- Ralph Norman Angell MP Member of Parliament for North Bradford since May, 1929. For public and political services.
- Professor Charles Raymond Beazley JP Professor of Mediaeval and Modern History in the University of Birmingham.
- Henry James Buckland, General Manager of the Crystal Palace.
- John Caulcutt, deputy chairman, Export Credits Guarantee Advisory Committee.
- (Edward) Percival Clarke, Senior Prosecuting Counsel to the Crown at the Central Criminal Court.
- Alfred Thomas Davies CBE JP Member of Parliament for the City of Lincoln 1918–24. For public and political services.
- Arthur James Dawson CBE DCL JP Lately Director of Education to the Durham County Education Authority.
- William Alfred Cecil Goodchild CMG Assistant Delegate and General Secretary to the British Delegation, Reparations Commission.
- Alderman Fred Hayward JP For eight years Chairman of Central and United Boards of the Co-operative Union. For three years Chairman of the Parliamentary Committee of the Co-operative Congress. For public and political services.
- Alfred Howarth. For many years Town Clerk of Preston.
- Albert Edward Humphries Chairman of the National Joint Industrial Council for the Flour Mailing Industry.
- John Joseph Hunt JP Member of the East Riding County Council. For public services and benefactions in the East Riding.
- Alderman William Jenkins JP MP Member of Parliament for the Neath Division since 1922. For public and political services.
- His Honour Judge Thomas Artemus Jones KC JP Formerly British Commissioner on the Mexican Claims Commission.
- Ernest Gordon Graham Little FRCP MP Member of Senate, University of London, since 1906.
- Richard Winn Livingstone Vice-Chancellor of the Queen's University, Belfast.
- John Blackwood McEwen FRAM FRCM Principal of the Royal Academy of Music.
- John David Morgan JP For public and political services in Cardiff.
- Conrad James Naef CB CBE Accountant-General of the Navy.
- David John Owen, General Manager, Port of London Authority.
- Henry Howard Piggott CB CBE Deputy Secretary, Ministry of Transport.
- Hugh Stevenson Roberton, Founder and Conductor of the Glasgow Orpheus Choir.
- Professor William Rothenstein Principal, Royal College of Art. For several years Professor of Civic Art, Sheffield University.
- James Sexton CBE JP MP Member of Parliament for St. Helens since 1918. Member of the General Council of the Trades Union Congress since 1923. For public and political services.
- Major Robert Inigo Tasker TD JP DL Chairman of the London County Council.
- Daniel Lleufer Thomas JP For many years Stipendiary Magistrate for Pontypridd and Rhondda.
- James Smith Whitaker MRCS LRCP Senior Medical Officer, Ministry of Health.
- Herbert William Wrangham Wilberforce, deputy chairman, County of London Sessions. Chairman and past President of the All England Lawn Tennis Club.
- Ambrose Edgar Woodall FRCS Medical Superintendent of the Manor House Hospital, Golders Green.
- Robert Young OBE MP Chairman of Committees, House of Commons, since 1929. Member of Parliament for the Newton Division of Lancashire since 1918. For public and political services.

Dominions

- The Honourable Tasker Keech Cook. Member of the Executive Council and of the Legislative Council of Newfoundland.
- Arthur Dudley Dobson MInstCE For services in the Dominion of New Zealand.
- Colonel Alexander Weston Jarvis CMG MVO TD Chairman of the Council of the Royal Empire Society.
- Cecil Leys, of the City of Auckland. For services in the Dominion of New Zealand.

British India

- Justice John William Fisher Beaumont KC Barrister-at-Law, Chief Justice in the High Court of Judicature, Bombay.
- Rai Bahadur Lala Sita Ram MLC President, Legislative Council, United Provinces.
- Ali Muhammad Khan Dehlavi, Barrister-at-Law, President of the recently prorogued Legislative Council, Bombay.
- Justice Hubert Grayhurst Pearson, Barrister-at-Law, Puisne Judge of the High Court of Judicature at Fort William in Bengal.
- Khan Bahadur Mirza Zaffar Ali, Punjab Civil Service (retired), lately Puisne Judge of the High Court of Judicature at Lahore, Punjab.
- Alexander Robert Loftus Tottenham CIE Indian Civil Service, Senior Member, Central Board of Revenue, Government of India.
- Ralph Oakden CSI OBE Indian Civil Service, Senior Member, Board of Revenue, United Provinces.
- Francis Charles Griffith CSI OBE Indian Police Service, Inspector-General of Police, Bombay.
- Charles Stead OBE MVO Indian Police Service, Inspector-General of Police, Punjab.
- Percy Rothera OBE Agent, South Indian Railway, Madras.
- Maurice George Simpson CSI MIEE Director-in-Chief, Indo-European Telegraph Department.
- Khan Bahadur Qazi Aziz-ud-din Ahmad CIE OBE ISO Dewan, Datia State, Central India.
- Oscar de Glanville CIE OBE Barrister-at-Law, Burma.
- Kikabhai Premchand, Banker, Bombay.
- Charles Edgar Wood, Senior Partner of Messrs. Parry and Company, Madras.
- Thomas Dugald Edelston, lately Senior Partner of Messrs. Begg, Dunlop and Company Ltd., Calcutta.

Colonies, Protectorates, etc.

- Herbert Layard Dowbiggin CMG Inspector-General of Police, Ceylon.
- Lancelot Henry Elphinstone, Chief Justice of the Federated Malay States.
- William Woodward Hornell CIE Vice-Chancellor of Hong Kong University.
- Sidney Orme Rowan-Hamilton, Chief Justice of Bermuda.

=== The Most Honourable Order of the Bath ===
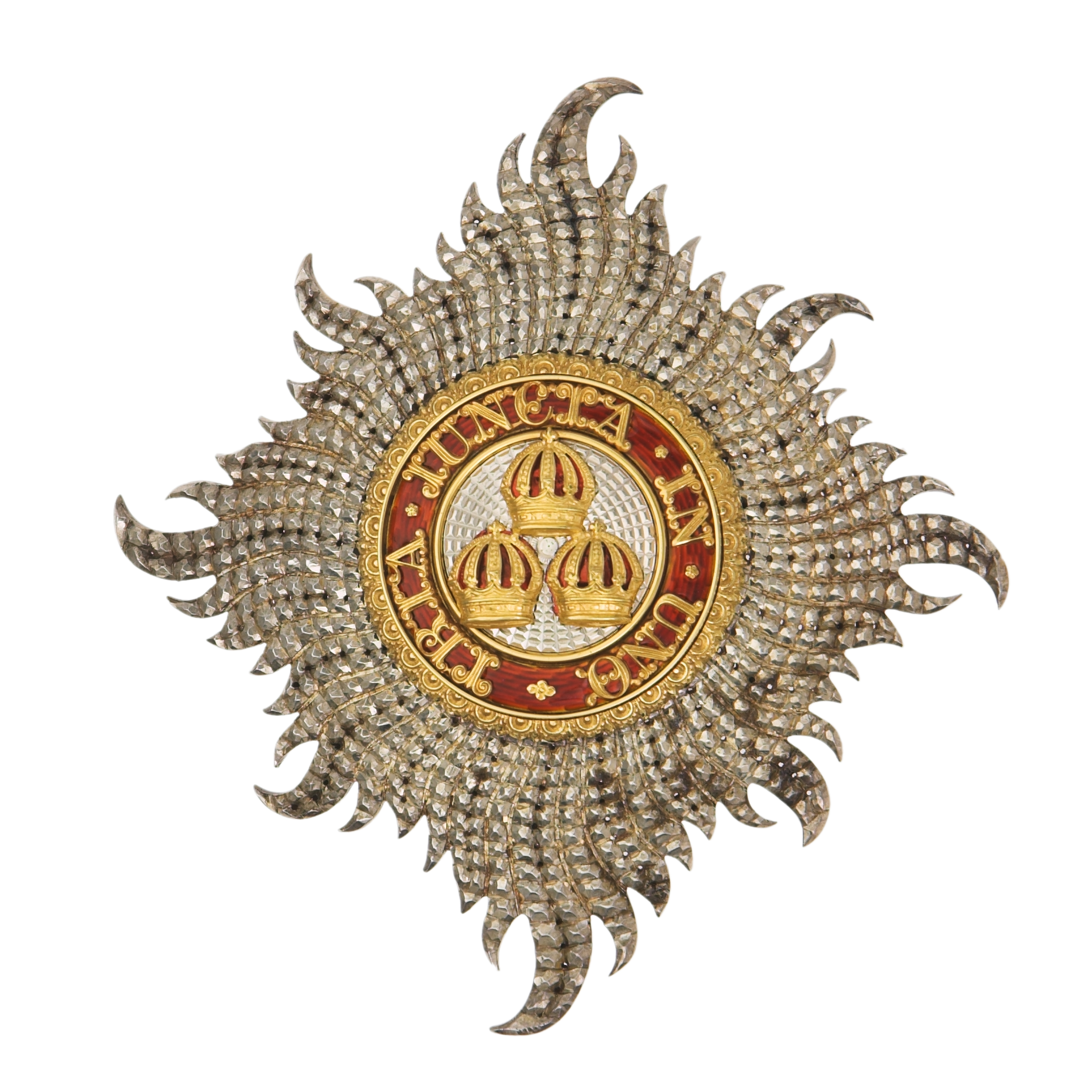
Civil star of the Knight Grand Cross of the Order of the Bath

==== Knight Grand Cross of the Order of the Bath (GCB) ====
Military Division

Army

- General Sir Robert Dundas Whigham KCB KCMG DSO Colonel, The Royal Warwickshire Regiment, Aide-de-Camp General to The King, General Officer Commanding-in-Chief, Eastern Command.

Civil Division

- Sir Oswyn Alexander Ruthven Murray KCB Permanent Secretary, Admiralty.

==== Knight Commander of the Order of the Bath (KCB) ====
Military Division
Royal Navy

- Vice-Admiral William Archibald Howard Kelly CB CMG MVO
- Engineer Vice-Admiral Reginald William Skelton CB CBE DSO

Army

- Lieutenant-General Harold Ben Fawcus CB CMG DSO DCL (late Royal Army Medical Corps), Director-General, Army Medical Services, The War Office.

Civil Division

- Sir Edward Hall Alderson KBE CB Clerk of the Parliaments.
- Frank Edward Smith CB CBE FRS Secretary to the Committee of the Privy Council for Scientific and Industrial Research. Secretary to the Royal Society.
- Reginald Townsend CBE Director of Ordnance Factories.

==== Companion of the Order of the Bath (CB) ====
Military Division
Royal Navy

- Captain (Commodore 2nd Class) Henry Stockwell DSO RD RNR (Retired).
- Instructor Captain John Camp RN

Army

- Major-General Lawrence Humphry CMG (late Royal Army Medical Corps), deputy director of Medical Services, Western Command, India.
- Colonel (temporary Brigadier) Alexander Duncan Macpherson CMG DSO (late The Queen's Own Cameron Highlanders), Commander, Canal Brigade, The British Troops in Egypt.
- Colonel (temporary Brigadier) Reginald Francis Arthur Hobbs CMG DSO (late Royal Engineers), Brigadier in charge of Administration, Western Command.
- Colonel (temporary Brigadier) Verney Asser CMG DSO (late Royal Artillery), Commander, Royal Artillery,. 4th Division, Eastern Command.
- Colonel (temporary Brigadier) Arthur Cecil Temperley CMG DSO (late The Norfolk Regiment), deputy director of Military Operations and Intelligence, The War Office.
- Colonel (Honorary Brigadier) Hamlet Bush Toller CMG Retired pay (late Royal Army Pay Corps), late Chief Paymaster at The War Office, and Officer in Charge of Records, Royal Army Pay Corps.
- Major General Hugh Francis Edward MacMahon CBE MC Indian Army, Director of Supplies and Transport, Headquarters Staff of the Army in India.
- Colonel (temporary Brigadier) Sidney Bernard Orton, Indian Army, Commander, Allahabad Brigade Area, Lucknow District, India.
- Colonel (temporary Brigadier) Henry Clare Duncan DSO OBE Indian Army, Commander, Zhob (Independent) Brigade Area, Western Command, India.
- Colonel Bryan Norman Abbay, Indian Army, late Commandant, 18th King, Edward's Own Cavalry, Indian Army.

Royal Air Force

- Air Commodore Patrick Henry Lyon Playfair MC

Civil Division

- Colonel Cuthbert Buckle CBE Territorial Army.
- Captain the Honourable Bede Edmund Hugh Clifford CMG MVO Imperial Secretary, South African High Commission, and Representative in the Union of South Africa of His Majesty's Government in the United Kingdom.
- James William Henry Culling CBE Director of Victualling, Admiralty.
- Henry Arthur Augustus Ellis, A Senior Clerk in the House of Commons.
- Ioan Gwilym Gibbon CBE Principal Assistant Secretary, Ministry of Health.
- Rear-Admiral Theodore John Hallett CBE
- Robert Lockhart Hobson, Keeper of Ceramics and Ethnography, British Museum.
- Major and Brevet Lieutenant-Colonel Hastings Lionel Ismay DSO Sam Browne's Cavalry (12th Frontier Force), Indian Army. Lately Senior Assistant Secretary, Committee of Imperial Defence.
- George Augustus Mounsey CMG OBE Assistant Under-Secretary of State, Foreign Office.
- Lucius Abel John Granville Ram JP Second Parliamentary Counsel.
- Alfred Edward Stamp FSA Deputy Keeper of the Public Records and Keeper of the Land Revenue Records.
- Rear-Admiral John Knowles im Thurn CMG CBE

=== The Most Exalted Order of the Star of India ===
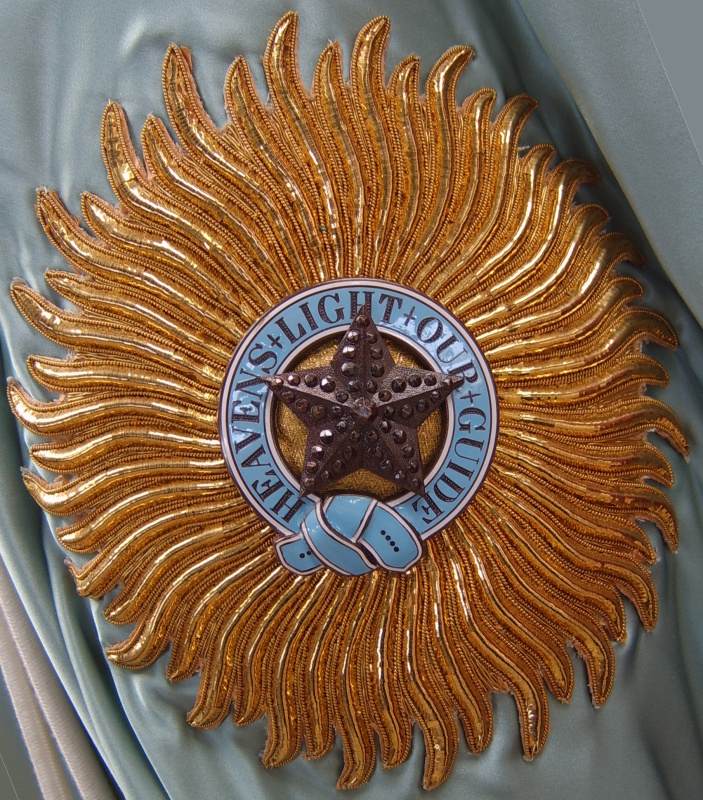
Star of a Knight Grand Commander of the Most Exalted Order of the Star of India.

==== Knight Grand Commander (GCSI) ====
- His Highness Maharajadhiraja Maharana Sir Bhupal Singh Bahadur KCIE Maharaja. of Udaipur, Rajputana.
- Lieutenant-Colonel His Highness Shri Sir Rajaram Chhatrapati Maharaj GCIE Maharaja of Kolhapur, Bombay Presidency.

Honorary Knight Grand Commander

- Major-General His Highness Projjwal-Nepal Tara-Dhish Sri Sri Sri Maharaja Sir Bhim Shumsher Jang Bahadur Rana KCSI KCVO Prime Minister and Supreme Commander-in-Chief of Nepal.

==== Knight Commander (KCSI) ====
- Lieutenant His Highness Raja Jogindar Sen Bahadur, Raja of Mandi, Punjab States.
- Thakor Saheb Shri Sir Daulatsinhji Jasvatsinhji KCIE Thakor Saheb of Limbdi, Western India States.
- Sir Norman Edward Marjoribanks KCIE CSI Indian Civil Service (retired), chairman, Madras Services Commission, Madras.

==== Companion (CSI) ====
- Hugh Kynaston Briscoe CIE Indian Civil Service, Chief Secretary to the Government of Bihar and Orissa.
- Thomas Couper, Indian Civil Service, Member of the Executive Council of the Governor of Burma.
- Charles Banks Cunningham, Indian Police Service, Inspector-General of Police, Madras.
- Joseph Hugh Garrett, Indian Civil Service, Acting Commissioner, Northern Division, Bombay.
- Nawab Malik Muhammad Hayat Khan, Nun, Punjab Civil Service Commissioner, Lahore, Punjab.
- Courtenay Latimer CIE Indian Civil Service, Political Department, Officiating Revenue Commissioner, and Deputy Chief Commissioner, North-West Frontier Province.
- Thomas Henry Morony CIE Indian Police Service, Inspector-General of Police, Central Provinces.
- Kunwar Jagdisb Prasad CIE OBE Indian Civil Service, Chief Secretary to the Government of the United Provinces.
- Sir Charles Augustus Tegart CIE MVO Indian Police Service, Commissioner of Police, Calcutta, Bengal.
- Gilbert Wiles CIE Indian Civil Service, Secretary to the Government of Bombay, Finance Department.

=== The Most Distinguished Order of Saint Michael and Saint George ===
Star of the Order of Saint Michael and Saint George.

==== Knight Grand Cross of the Order of St Michael and St George (GCMG) ====
- The Right Honourable Sir Francis Oswald Lindley KCMG CB CBE His Majesty's Ambassador Extraordinary and Plenipotentiary at Lisbon.
- Sir Robert Gilbert Vansittart KCB CMG MVO Permanent Under-Secretary of State for Foreign Affairs.

Honorary Knight Grand Cross

- His Highness Tuanku Muhammad KCMG KCVO ibni almerhum Yam Tuan Antah, Yang di-pertuan Besar of the Negri Sembilan, Federated Malay States.

==== Knight Commander of the Order of St Michael and St George (KCMG) ====
- Sir Harry Gloster Armstrong KBE His Majesty's Consul-General at New York.
- Sir Harry Fagg Batterbee KCVO CMG Assistant Under-Secretary of State, Dominions Office.
- Sir Edward Brandis Denham KBE CMG Governor and Commander-in-Chief of the Colony of British Guiana.
- William Meyrick Hewlett CMG His Majesty's Consul-General at Nanking.
- Arthur William Hill CMG FRS Director of the Royal Botanic Gardens, Kew.
- The Honourable Sir Walter Hartwell James Kt KC Chancellor of the University of Western Australia. For services in that State.
- Lancelot Oliphant CB CMG Assistant Under-Secretary of State, Foreign Office.
- Sir William Peel KBE CMG Governor and Commander-in-Chief of the Colony of Hong Kong.
- The Honourable Ernest Stowell Scott CMG MVO lately His Majesty's Envoy Extraordinary and Minister Plenipotentiary at Montevideo.
- Thomas Shenton Whitelegge Thomas CMG OBE Governor and Commander-in-Chief of the Nyasaland Protectorate.

==== Companion of the Order of St Michael and St George (CMG) ====
- George Sinclair Browne, Senior Resident, Northern Provinces, Nigeria.
- Alexander Crabb, Secretary, Office of the High Commissioner in London for the Dominion of New Zealand.
- Cecil Moore Dobbs OBE Provincial Commissioner, Kenya.
- Charles Henry Hart-Davis, Commissioner, Colony of Cyprus.
- Charles Henry Hutchings OBE KC Inspector-General of Constabulary, Newfoundland.
- James Lornie, British Resident, Selangor, Federated Malay States.
- Reginald Marquand, lately Controller of European Administration, Ministry of Education, Egypt.
- Thomas Millard, Treasurer, Colony of British Guiana.
- Thomas Joseph Morris, His Majesty's Envoy Extraordinary and Minister Plenipotentiary (local rank) at Havana.
- Charles William Orde, Counsellor in the Foreign Office.
- Major Arthur Charles Cosmo Parkinson OBE Assistant Secretary, Colonial Office.
- Owen Surtees Phillpotts OBE Commercial Secretary at His Majesty's Legation at Vienna.
- Thomas Reid, of the Ceylon Civil Service.
- Montague John Rendall Chairman of the School Empire-Tour Committee.
- Henry Tom MBE His Majesty's Consul-General at Antwerp.
- George Alexander Troup, Mayor of Wellington. For public services in the Dominion of New Zealand.
- Oswald White, His Majesty's Consui-General at Seoul.

=== Order of the Indian Empire ===
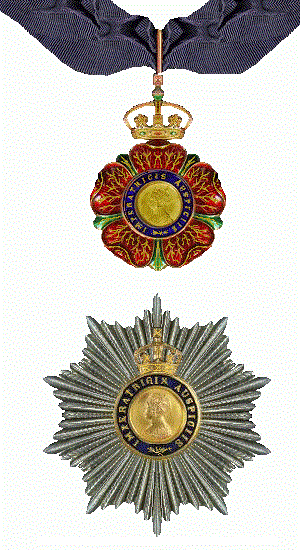
Riband, badge and star of the Knight Grand Commander of the Order of the Indian Empire

==== Knight Grand Commander (GCIE) ====
- His Highness Maharajadhiraj Sir Gulab Singh Bahadur KCSI Maharaja of Rewa, Central India.
- Lieutenant-Colonel His Highness Rais-ud-Daula Sipahdar-ul-Mulk, Maharajadhiraj Sri Sawai Maharaj Rana Sir Udaibhan Singh Lokindar Bahadur Diler Jang Jai Deo KCSI KCVO Maharaj Rana of Dholpur, Rajputana.
- His Highness Nawab Sir Mahabat Khanji III Rasul Khanji KCSI Nawab of Junagadh, Western India States.

==== Knight Commander (KCIE) ====
- Steuart Edmund Pears CSI CIE Indian Civil Service, Political Department, Chief Commissioner and Agent to the Governor General, North West Frontier Province.
- Samuel Andrew Smyth CSI Indian Civil Service, lately Member of the Executive Council of the Governor of Burma.

==== Companion (CIE) ====
- John Ackroyd Woodhead, Indian Civil Service, Secretary to the Government of India, Commerce Department.
- Gordon Sidney Hardy, Indian Civil Service, Acting Member, Central Board of Revenue, Government of India.
- Walter Booth-Gravely, Indian Civil Service, Commissioner, Pegu Division, Burma.
- Eyre Gordon, Indian Civil Service, Officiating Chief Secretary to the Government of the Central Provinces.
- William Alexander Cosgrave, Indian Civil Service, Officiating Chief Secretary to the Government of Assam.
- Godfrey Ferdinando Stratford Collins OBE Indian Civil Service, Secretary to the Government of Bombay, Home Department.
- Alexander Cassells, Indian Civil Service, Secretary to the Government of Bengal, Finance Department.
- James Augustine Sweeney, Indian Civil Service, Judicial Secretary and Legal Remembrancer to the Government of Bihar and Orissa.
- Captain Hector Boyes CMG Royal Navy, lately Senior Naval Officer in the Persian Gulf.
- Major Eric Edward Doyle DSO Indian Medical Service, Inspector-General of Prisons, Bombay.
- Rai Bahadur Sarat Chandra Banerjee, President, Calcutta Improvement Trust Tribunal, Bengal.
- William Leonard Stampe, Indian Service of Engineers, Superintending Engineer, Public Works Department, United Provinces.
- Ronald Evelyn Leslie Wingate, Indian Civil Service, Political Department, lately Political. Agent and Deputy Commissioner, Quetta-Peshin District, Baluchistan.
- Major Harold Wilberforce-Bell, Indian Army, Political Department, Deputy Secretary to the Government of India, Foreign and Political Department.
- William Hawthorne Lewis, Indian Civil Service, Officer; on Special Duty in the Reforms Office, Government of India.
- Lieutenant-Colonel Jasper Robert Joly Tyrrell Indian Medical Service, Chief Medical Officer in Central India.
- Mukund Lai Pasricha, Deputy Director-General, Telegraphs.
- Brevet Lieutenant-Colonel Hastings Lionel Ismay DSO lately Assistant Secretary, Committee of Imperial Defence.
- Francis Holy Burkitt OBE Indian Service of Engineers, Superintending Engineer, Public Works Department, Punjab.
- Frederick Theodore Jones MVO Indian Service of Engineers, Superintending Engineer, Public Works Department, Delhi.
- Lieutenant-Colonel Hugh William Acton, Indian Medical Service, Director, School of Tropical Medicine and Hygiene, Calcutta.
- Lieutenant-Colonel (Honorary Colonel) Horace Craigie Manders VD Auxiliary Force, India, Commandant, Assam Valley Light Horse, A.F.I.
- Captain Thomas Wynford Rees DSO MC Indian Army, lately Private Secretary to His Excellency the Governor of Burma.
- Claude Francis Strickland, Indian Civil Service (retired), recently Registrar, Co-operative Credit Societies, Punjab.
- Gordon Herbert Ramsay Halland OBE Indian Police Service, Senior Superintendent of Police, Punjab.
- Rai Bahadur Seray Mal Bapna, Prime Minister to His Highness the Maharaja Holkar of Indore, Central India.
- George Hemming Spence, Indian Civil Service, Joint Secretary and Draftsman to the Government of India, Legislative Department.
- Birendra Nath De, Indian Civil Service, Officiating Commissioner, Berar Division, Central Provinces.
- Frederick Charles Isemonger CBE Indian Police Service, lately Inspector-General of Police, North-West Frontier Province.
- Lieutenant-Colonel Ian MacPherson MacRae OBE Indian Medical Service, Inspector-General of Prisons, Bihar and Orissa.
- Hugh Bomford, Indian Civil Service, Magistrate and Collector, United Provinces.
- Richard Harcourt Williamson, Indian Civil Service, Magistrate and Collector, United Provinces.
- Alfred Master, Indian Civil Service, Collector and District Magistrate, Kaira, Bombay.
- James Birch Brown, Indian Civil Service, Collector and District Magistrate, Madras.
- Francis William Stewart MC Indian Civil Service, Collector and District Magistrate, Madras.
- Harry Vincent Braham, Indian Civil Service, Collector and District Magistrate, Surat, Bombay.
- Herbert Rex Uzielli, Indian Civil Service, Collector and District Magistrate, Madras.
- James Peddie, Indian Civil Service, Magistrate and Collector, Midnapore, Bengal.
- James Alexander Dawson, Indian Civil Service, Deputy Commissioner, Sylhet, Assam.
- George Alexander Shillidy, Indian Police Service, Deputy Inspector-General of Police, Northern Range, Ahmedabad, Bombay.
- George Trevor Hamilton Harding, Indian Police Service, Senior Superintendent of Police, Lahore, Punjab.
- Rai Bahadur Promode Chandra Dutta, Pleader, Assam.

=== The Royal Victorian Order ===
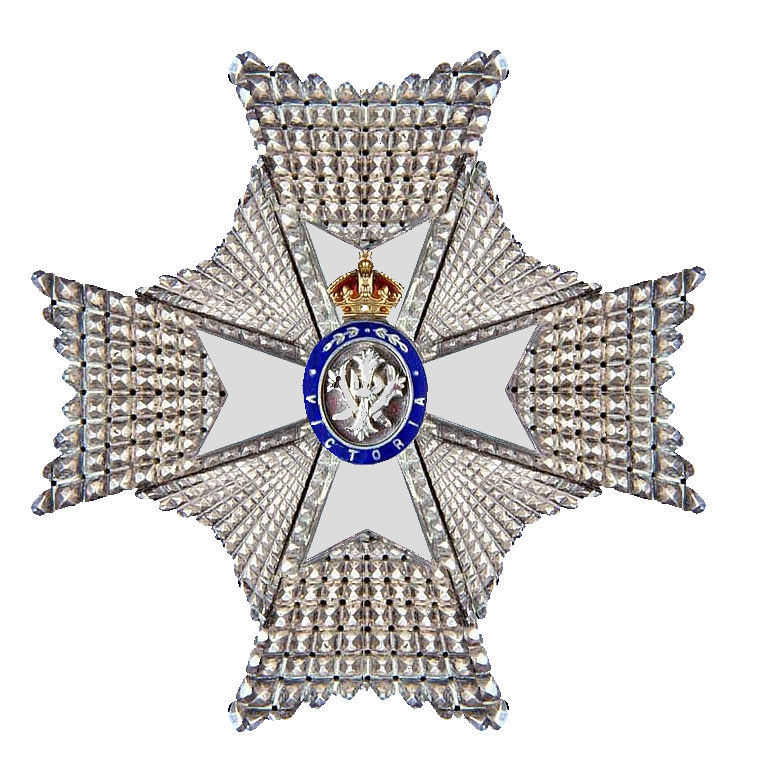
Insignia of a Knight / Dames Commander of the Royal Victorian Order

==== Knight Grand Cross of the Royal Victorian Order (GCVO) ====
- Arnold Allan Cecil, Earl of Albemarle KCVO CB
- James Buchanan, Baron Woolavington.
- Captain the Hon. Sir Seymour John Fortescue KCVO CMG RN

==== Knight Commander of the Royal Victorian Order (KCVO) ====
- Captain Sir Arthur Wellesley Clarke KBE
- Harold Brakspear
- Ashley Watson Mackintosh

==== Commander of the Royal Victorian Order (CVO) ====
- Christopher Lloyd MVO MBE
- Arthur Gabriel Morrish MVO
- Frederick Albert Minter
- Walter Westley Russell RA

==== Member of the Royal Victorian Order, 4th class (MVO) ====
- Lieutenant-Colonel Norman Gibb Scorgie CBE
- Marcus Antonius Johnston de Lavis-Trafford OBE
- Commander William Scott Bardwell RN (dated 23 August 1930).
- The Reverend Bernard Charles Spencer Everett
- The Reverend Edmund Horace Fellowes

==== Member of the Royal Victorian Order, 5th class (MVO) ====
- John William Hopkins
- Arthur Walter Mills
- Lewis Stainton
- Joseph Hammond Whitehorn

=== Order of Merit (OM) ===
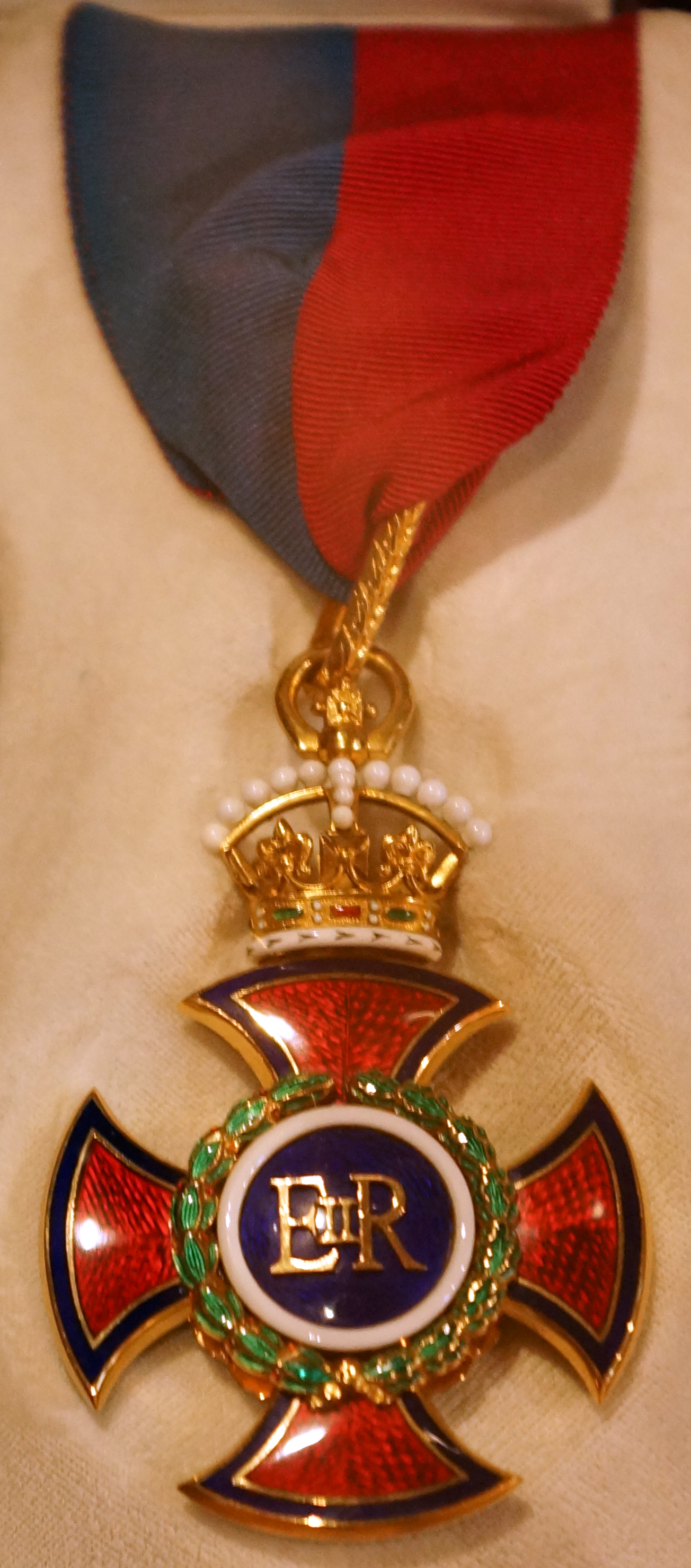
The riband and badge of the Order of Merit

- Admiral of the Fleet Sir Charles Edward Madden Bt GCB GCVO KCMG in recognition of distinguished services rendered to his Country in Peace and War.
- Philip Wilson Steer, in recognition of his eminent position in the World of Art, both as Painter and Teacher.

=== The Most Excellent Order of the British Empire ===
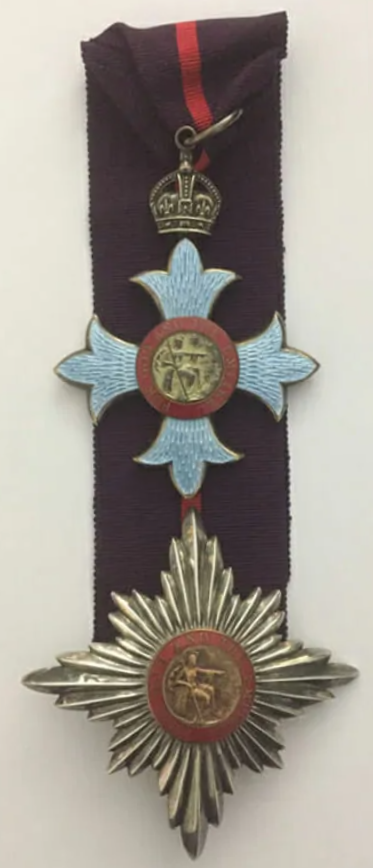
Knight Commander of the Order of the British Empire, insignia 1917–35

==== Dame Grand Cross of the Order of the British Empire (GBE) ====
- Ishbel Maria, Marchioness of Aberdeen and Temair JP President, International Council of Women, 1893-1899 and since 1904. President, Irish Industries Association. President, Women's National Health Association of Ireland.

==== Knight Commander of the Order of the British Empire (KBE) ====
Civil Division

- Sir Alfred Edward Lewis, Director and Chief General Manager of the National Provincial Bank.
- Willmott Lewis. Times correspondent in Washington.

British India

- Major Nawab Muhammad Akbar Khan CIE of Hoti, Peshawar District, North-West Frontier Province.

==== Commander of the Order of the British Empire (CBE) ====
Military Division
Army

- Colonel (temporary Brigadier) Lionel Arthur Fanshawe DSO OBE Indian Army, Director of Ordnance Services, Army Headquarters, India.

Civil Division

- William Barrowclough Brown, Principal Private Secretary to the President of the Board of Trade.
- John Donovan JP Secretary for the South Wales and Monmouthshire Area of the Transport and General Workers Union. Alderman of the Cardiff City Council and Chairman of the Health, Port Sanitary and Maternity and Child Welfare Committee. For public and political services.
- Charles Edwards JP MP A Lord Commissioner of the Treasury since 1929. Member of Parliament for Bedwellty since 1918.
- Frank Minshull Elgood OBE FRIBA Chairman of the National Housing and Town Planning Council. Joint Honorary Treasurer of the Church Army.
- Caroline Haslett. Director, The Electrical Association for Women. Secretary of the Women's Engineering Society (Inc.)
- Wesley Lambert. President of the Institute of British Foundrymen.
- Frederick Walker Mackinney. For services in an advisory capacity to the Empire Marketing Board.
- Edith Helen Major FRHS Mistress of Girton College, Cambridge.
- Louisa Martindale JP President of the Medical Women's Federation and vice-president of the Medical Women's International Association.
- William Heathcote Unwin Napier, Controller of the London Telephone Service.
- John Allen Parkinson MP A Lord Commissioner of the Treasury since 1929. Member of Parliament for Wigan since 1918.
- The Reverend Prebendary Edward de Montjoie Rudolf. Founder of the Church of England Waifs and Strays Society.
- Professor Sidney Russ Professor of Physics, Medical School, Middlesex Hospital. For work in connection with radium.
- John Johnson Shaw, Seismologist. Secretary to the Seismological Section of the British Association.
- John Stark OBE Assistant Commissioner of Police for the City of London.
- Francis Bernard Stead, Chief Inspector of Secondary Schools, Board of Education.
- James Hubert Taylor, Deputy Controller of Death Duties, Estate Duty Office, Board of Inland Revenue.
- Major Ernest Blechynden Waggett DSO TD MRCS LRCP Honorary Consultant in diseases of the throat, nose and ear, to the Queen Alexandra Military Hospital.

British India

- Lionel Burton Burrows, Bengal Civil Service, Magistrate and Collector, Mymensingh, Bengal.
- Agnes Catherine Scott Women's Medical Service, Chief Medical Officer and Secretary, Dufferin Funds. (Dated 15 December 1930.)
- Philip Herbert Joseph Measures, Indian Police Service, Superintendent of Police, Allahabad, United Provinces.
- Rai Bahadur Satya Charan Mukherjee MLA Zamindar, Hooghly District, Bengal. (Dated 15 December 1930.)

Colonies, Protectorates, etc.

- William Waddel, Superintendent, State Advances Department, Dominion of New Zealand.

Diplomatic Service And Overseas List

- Lieutenant-Colonel Francis Cecil Campbell Balfour CIE MC Governor, Mongalla Province, Sudan.
- Walter Russell Brown AM His Majesty's Consul-General at Hankow.
- Wilfred Hansford Gallienne, His Majesty's Consul at Santo Domingo.
- George Alexander, President of the Court of Appeal, Ministry of Justice, Iraq.
- Walter Bowerley, Auditor, Gold Coast.
- Edward Carlyon Eliot, Administrator of Dominica, Leeward Islands.
- Lucie Fairbanks, Lady McMillan. For philanthropic services in Kenya.

Honorary Commanders

- Emir of Muri Muhammadu Mafindi, Emir of Muri, Nigeria.

==== Officer of the Order of the British Empire (OBE) ====
Military Division
Royal Navy

- Lieutenant-Commander George William Field RN (Retired).
- Lieutenant Sidney Thomas Morgan RN

Army

- Major Benjamin George Atkin DSO MC The Manchester Regiment, late Officer Commanding 2nd (Nyasaland) Battalion, The King's African Rifles, Tanganyika Territory.
- Major Bertrand Lambert Drieberg, Ceylon Engineers; Ceylon Defence Force.
- The Reverend John Percy Hales DSO TD (Chaplain to the Forces, Royal Army Chaplains Department, Territorial Army), retired.
- Lieutenant-Colonel Samuel George Steele Haughton Indian Medical Service, Officer Commanding Combined Indian Military Hospital, Kohat, India.
- Major (Commissary) Edward McPoland, Indian Miscellaneous List, Officer Supervisor, Military Secretary's Branch, Army Headquarters, India.
- Major (local Lieutenant-Colonel) John Howard Stafford MC Royal Engineers; for services on the Anglo-Italian Somaliland Boundary Commission.
- Captain and Brevet Lieutenant-Colonel William Henry Stanway DSO MC The South Wales Borderers, attached Auxiliary Force, India.
- Major William Edward van Cutsem MC Royal Engineers, General Staff Officer 2nd Grade, War Office.
- Major Robert Henry Walsh DSO MC Royal Artillery, late Commandant, Eastern Arab Corps, Sudan Defence Force.
- Lieutenant Joseph Waterson, Territorial Army Reserve of Officers, local Captain and Quartermaster, Nigeria Regiment, Royal West African Frontier Force.

Civil Division

- Captain Walter Murray Ablewhite MC Steward of the Bethlem Royal Hospital.
- Ralph Allan Vice-chairman of the Northumberland Public Assistance Committee.
- John Hughes Ashley Chief Constable, Criminal Investigation Department, Metropolitan Police.
- James Brown Superintendent, Royal Ammunition Factories, Royal Arsenal, Woolwich.
- Robert Stanley Capon, Superintendent of Scientific Research, Royal Aircraft Establishment, Air Ministry.
- Joseph MacLeod Carey, H.M. Divisional Inspector of Mines.
- George Harry Collinge, Chairman of the National Federation of Meat Traders (Mutual) Insurance Association. A Past President of the Executive Council of the National Federation of Meat Traders.
- John Soden Corbett Secretary, Empire Forestry Association.
- Captain William Redwood Davey. Head of the Prison Mission Department of the Church Army.
- George Thomas Dixon, Livestock Commissioner, Ministry of Agriculture and Fisheries.
- Charles Cleveland Ellis, Senior General Inspector of the Department of Health for Scotland.
- John Bevan-Evans JP Member of the National Savings Committee.
- Francis Edward Forward FRCS LRCP Class I Prison Medical Officer, Home Office.
- James Hill JP Chairman of the West Bromwich Smethwick and District War Pensions Committee.
- Richard Pote-Hunt, Admiralty, Pilot on the Lower Yangtse.
- John Charles Innes, Member of the National Savings Committee.
- George Kay, Assistant Accountant General, General Post Office.
- Fred Kershaw JP Financial Adviser for Trade Union Approved Societies. For Services in connexion with the Insurance side of Trade Union Work.
- John King, Deputy Chief Ship Surveyor, Mercantile Marine Department, Board of Trade.
- Joseph Legge JP Chairman of the Willenhall Local Employment Committee.
- Joan Stewart Hamon McCabe. Headmistress, Milham Ford Secondary School, Oxford.
- George McKellar JP Provost of Ardrossan. Some time Chairman of the Joint Hospital Committee for the Burghs of Ardrossan and Saltcoats.
- Frank Richard Marten Assistant Solicitor, India Office.
- Major Robert Walter Mellish. Judge of Alderney.
- Alexander Morgan FRSE A member of-the Scottish Savings Committee.
- Theodora Matilda Morton. Late Principal Organiser of Children's Care Work under the London County Council.
- Edward John Scarles, Collector, London Port, Board of Customs and Excise.
- Frank Nevill Smith, Principal Private Secretary to the Minister of Pensions.
- Agnes Elsie Diana Stewart (Agnes Herbert). For many years editor of the Artists and Writers Year Book. Member of the Council of the Society of Women Journalists.
- Francis Timbrell, Chief Constable of the Borough of Bedford.
- George Clifford Widdowson Chief Quantity Surveyor, H.M. Office of Works.
- Robert Bruce Wilson, Senior Inspector of Taxes, Board of Inland Revenue.
- John Lade Worsfold, Clerk and Receiver to the Royal Hospitals, of Bridewell and Bethlem.

Diplomatic Service And Overseas List

- Humphrey Ingelram Prideaux-Brune, One of His Majesty's Vice-Consuls in China.
- Philip Lancelot Burnett. For services in connection with the Queen Victoria Memorial Hospital at Marseilles.
- Robert Carey Griffiths, British Vice-Consul at Santa Cruz de Tenerife.
- Ralph William Gordon Reed, Headmaster, Victoria College, Ramleh.
- Arthur Patrick Thompson, Manager, Gash Board, Aroma.

Colonies, Protectorates, etc.

- Vincent Patrick Burke MBE Deputy President, Bureau of Education, Newfoundland.
- Captain George Benson Moseley. Resident Magistrate, Bechuanaland Protectorate.
- William Mansfield Aders lately Economic Biologist, Zanzibar.
- Dorothy Martha Buckle, Principal of Raffles Girls School, Singapore.
- Edgar William Carpenter, Senior Assistant to the Director of Public Works, Hong Kong.
- John Coates, Government Printer, Uganda Protectorate.
- The Reverend George Francis Graham-Brown For services in Palestine.
- Major Bernard Hill Horsley DSO MC Commissioner, Somaliland Protectorate.
- Arthur Hutton McShine Nominated Unofficial Member of the Legislative Council of Trinidad and Tobago. For public services.
- John Edward Siegfried Merrick, Principal Assistant Colonial Secretary, Kenya.
- Henry Morgan Monk, Collector of Customs and Excise, Ministry of Finance, Iraq.
- Mehmet Munir Bey, Turkish Delegate of Evkaf, Cyprus, Member of the Executive Council, and lately Member of the Legislative Council of that Colony.
- Nicholas-Julian Paterson KC lately Attorney-General of Grenada, Windward Islands.
- John Richard Cook Stephens MRCS LRCP West African Medical Staff, Medical Officer, Nigeria.
- James Strachan MC AMInstCE Executive Engineer, Ministry of Irrigation and Agriculture, Iraq.
- Armigel de Vins Wade, Principal Assistant in the Native Affairs Department, Kenya.

British India

- Captain Hadji Dabiruddin Ahmad Bengal Medical Service, Teacher of Anatomy, Campbell Medical School, Bengal. (Dated 15 December 1930.)
- Godwin Edward Banwell MC Indian Police Service, Officiating District Superintendent of Police, Pegu, Burma. (Dated 15 December 1930.)
- Thomas Bertram MBE Superintendent, Viceregal Estates, Simla, Delhi, Calcutta and Dehra Dun.
- Neville Bernard Deane, Indian Audit and Accounts Service, Accountant-General, Burma. (Dated 15 December 1930.)
- Hubert St. Glair Freitas MBE Registrar, Office of the Private Secretary to His Excellency the Viceroy. (Dated 15 December 1930.)
- Stanley Webb-Johnson, Assistant Solicitor to the Government of India. (Dated 15 December 1930.)
- Khan Bahadur Taj Mohammed Khan, of Badreshi, Contractor, Supply and Transport Corps, Nowshera, North-West Frontier Province.
- Herbert Gordon Lang, Indian Police Service, Superintendent of Police, Great Indian Peninsula and Madras and Southern Mahratta Railways, Poona, Bombay. (Dated 15 December 1930.)
- Lieutenant-Colonel John William McCoy, Indian Medical Service (retired), Civil Surgeon and Superintendent of Jail, Sylhet, Assam. (Dated 15 December 1930.)
- Rai Bahadur Charu Chandra Mukharji, Deputy Commissioner, Manbhum, Bihar and Orissa. (Dated 15 December 1930.)
- Khan Bahadur Kavasji Jamshedji Petigara ISO Indian Police Service, Deputy Commissioner of Police, Bombay.
- Raja Bahadur Venkatrama Reddy, Commissioner of Police, Hyderabad City and Suburbs, His Exalted Highness the Nizam's Government, Hyderabad, Deccan. (Dated 15 December 1930.)
- James Alexander Scott, Indian Police Service, Principal, Punjab Police Training School, Phillaur, Punjab.
- Rana Umanath Baksh Singh, of Thalrai (Khajurgaon), Rai Bareli District, United Provinces. (Dated 15 December 1930.)
- Chandulal Madhavlal Trivedi, Indian Civil Service, Deputy Commissioner, Nagpur, Central Provinces.
- Oliver Ethelbert Windle, Indian Police Service, District Superintendent of Police, Madras.

Honorary Officers

- Malietoa Tanumafili of the Territory of Western Samoa. For services to the Government of the Dominion of New Zealand.

==== Member of the Order of the British Empire (MBE) ====
Military Division
Royal Navy

- Engineer Lieutenant-Commander Reginald Charles Drew RN
- Commissioned Wardmaster George Hewlett Toleroy Wilsmore RN (Retired).

Army

- Lieutenant (acting Captain) Syed Salleh Alsagoff, Penang and Province Wellesley Volunteer Corps, Straits Settlements Volunteer Force.
- Regimental Quartermaster-Sergeant James Valentine Booth, Malay States Volunteer Regiment.
- Warrant Officer Class II, Company Sergeant Major David Boyd DCM late Survey Battalion, Royal Engineers.
- Regimental Sergeant-Major William Harold Edmonds, Hong Kong Volunteer Defence Corps.
- Conductor Benjamin Massey, Indian Army Ordnance Corps, Attached Headquarters, Southern Command, India.
- Battery Sergeant-Major Thomas Oswald Mayhew, Singapore Volunteer Corps, Straits Settlements Volunteer Force.

Civil Division

- Ernest Alderson, Assessor and Collector of Taxes, Board of Inland Revenue.
- Harriet Amelia Alsop. Lately Matron, St. Mary Abbots Hospital, Kensington.
- Alexander Smith Anderson, Manager of the Norwich Union Life. Insurance Society in Aberdeen. A member of the Aberdeen, Banff and Kincardineshire War Pensions Committee.
- Major George Frederick Anderson MC Staff Officer, Mines Department, Board of Trade.
- Alexandro Emanuel James Arrighi, Higher Executive Officer, Board of Inland Revenue.
- Stephen Benjamin Valentine Bailey, Staff Officer (Taxes), Board of Inland Revenue.
- Williamina Mclntosh Barclay. Lately Nurse at St. Kilda.
- Richard Bell, Lately Assistant Accountant, Grade I, War Office.
- Frederick Montague, Bilby Registrar of Births, Deaths and Marriages for, the Finsbury District of London.
- Edith Blunt. Honorary Secretary, Association of Women Prison Visitors.
- Captain Francis Edwin Boaz MC Chief Quantity Surveyor, Imperial War Graves Commission, France.
- Councillor Thomas Judson Brooks JP Chairman of the Wakefield, Pontefract and District War Pensions Committee.
- Myra Ann Bushnell. Matron, Joint Fever Hospital, Wrexham.
- Charles Campbell, Sub-Inspecting Officer of Railways, Ministry of Transport.
- Lilian Mary Clapham. Staff Clerk, Ministry of Labour.
- Minnie Constance Clarke. Honorary Secretary, Wimbledon Savings Committee.
- William Clayton, Headmaster, Appleton Roebuck Council School, West Riding of Yorkshire.
- Charles Coates, Head of Section, H.M. Office of Works.
- William Harrison Cowlishaw, Architect, Imperial War Graves Commission, France.
- Agnes Emma Cox. Superintendent of the Female Exchange Staff of the London Telephone Service.
- William Henry Creelman, Examiner of Naval Ordnance Work, Woolwich.
- Frederick Walter Crothall. For services in connection with Empire Marketing.
- Stuart Davey, Staff Officer, Air Ministry.
- Albert Edward Davis, Superintendent, Metropolitan Police.
- Sarah Dickenson JP Member of the Manchester and District War Pensions Committee. For some time Chairman of the Children's Sub-Committee.
- Major Thomas Joseph Edwards. Retired Officer, War Office.
- Edgar Daniel Fear. Honorary Organiser for Norfolk, National Savings Committee.
- Jean Gray. Matron of the Leicester and Leicestershire Maternity Hospital.
- Councillor Ernest Hamlin. Vice-chairman, Holborn Savings Committee.
- Florence Annie James. Headmistress, Linden Road Infants School, Gloucester.
- Morton Jewell, Staff Officer, Dominions Office and Colonial Office.
- James Gilbert Jewels, Headmaster, Stephenson Memorial School, Wallsend.
- Charles Thomas Johnston, Superintendent and Deputy Chief Constable, Greenock Burgh Police.
- Margaret Jean Keay. For ten years Honorary Secretary, Derby Savings Committee.
- Harold Vaughan Kenyon JP Commandant, Metropolitan Special Constabulary
- William Lamerton, Principal Foreman of Storehouses, Naval Store Department, Admiralty.
- Eliza Jane Winifredia Mary (May) Langford. Member of the East Ham and Barking War Pensions Committee. For some time Chairman of the Children's Sub-Committee.
- Charles William Mayer, Secretary and Superintendent (non medical), Mental Deficiency Institution, Starcross.
- Captain Reginald Eric Jenners Moore. Intelligence Officer in the Exhibitions Division of the Department of Overseas Trade.
- Horace Leonard Nicholls, Higher Executive Officer, Ministry of Pensions.
- Frederic James Pearce, Staff Officer (Grade II), Ministry of Transport.
- Robert Syme Peddie, Postmaster Elgin, Morayshire.
- Thomas Edgar Pilgrim. Honorary Secretary, Aldeburgh Savings Committee.
- Ralph Joseph Pym Pollard, Honorary Secretary, Penrith Savings Committee.
- Clarence Woodburn Pugh, Honorary Secretary, Devizes Savings Committee.
- Mabel Caroline Rauscher. Assistant to the Controller of the Clearing Office, Board of Trade.
- Edward Roberts Lately Headmaster of Kingussie Secondary School.
- William Rushworth, Member of the South West Lancashire War Pensions Committee.
- Captain John Sandilands. Librarian, Royal Artillery Institution.
- Percival George Slade, Staff Officer, H.M. Treasury.
- John Henry Moore Smedley,. Chief Port Sanitary Inspector, Liverpool.
- George Smith, Engineer, H.M. Office of Works.
- Russell Edwin Stanley, Senior Staff Officer, Ministry of Agriculture., and Fisheries.
- Thomas Robert Thirtle. Postmaster, House of Commons.
- Ernest Arthur Warner, Chief Inspector of Ships Provisions, Board of Trade.
- William Henry Whiteley, Principal Clerk, Ministry of Pensions.
- Victor Ernest Wilkins Assistant Principal, Ministry of Agriculture and Fisheries.,

Diplomatic Service And Overseas List

- William John Richard Andrews, Superintendent of Publicity, Sudan Government Railways.
- John Deans RNR lately Acting British Vice-Consul at New York.
- Geraldine Forster, Social and Education worker in Khartoum.
- Robert John Knox, British Vice-Consul at Buenos Aires.
- Thomas Hilary Naftel, British Vice-Consul at Aguiles.
- Fred Stirk, Manager, Omdurman Technical School.
- John Campbell Thomson, Accountant at His Majesty's Embassy at Washington.

British India

- William Henry Prior de la Hey, Personal Assistant to the Military Secretary to His Excellency the Viceroy.
- Bakhtawar Singh Dillon, Colonel in the Patiala State Forces, Commandant, 1st Patiala (Rajendra) Lancers. (Dated 15 December 1930.)
- Eric Henry Frost, of the Imperial Secretariat Service, Officiating Superintendent, Home Department, Government of India.
- Khan Bahadur Saiyid Ghulam Hasnain, Deputy Superintendent of Police, Cawnpore, United Provinces.
- Khan Bahadur Darashah Dhanjishah Kothawala, Deputy Superintendent of Police, Criminal Investigation Department, Bombay. (Dated 15 December 1930.)
- Frank Henry Langley, Civilian Officer of the Military Farms Department, Peshawar, North-West Frontier Province.
- Edgar Samuel Lewis, Punjab Civil Service, Additional District Magistrate, Lahore, Punjab. (Dated 15 December 1930.)
- Homewell Lyngdoh, Assam Medical Service, Civil Surgeon, Nowgong, Assam. (Dated 15 December 1930.)
- Robert William Mantle, Public Works Department, New Delhi. (Dated 15 December 1930.)
- Arnold Christopher Mayberry, Deputy Superintendent of Police, Jubbulpore, Central Provinces. (Dated 15 December 1930.)
- James Joseph Angelo Piner, of the Imperial Secretariat Service, Superintendent, Foreign and Political Department, Government of India. (Dated 15 December 1930.)
- Saiyid Mujibur Rab, Indian Police Service, Officiating Superintendent of Police, Bihar and Orissa.
- Lachlan Macpherson Ryley, Assistant Inspector of Small Arms (Armourers), Ishapore, Bengal. (Dated 15 December 1930.)
- Raja Mukund Singh, of Hardoi, Jalaun District, United Provinces.
- Allan Carmichael Blackburn Stout, Telegraph Master, Peshawar, North-West Frontier Province. (Dated 15 December 1930.)
- Edward Patrick Warner, Officiating Superintendent of the Visapur Temporary Prison, Bombay. (Dated 15 December 1930.)
- Alfred Charles Willis, Indian Service of Engineers, Executive Engineer, Mon Canals Division, Burma.

Colonies, Protectorates, etc.

- Horatio Bacarisas, Assistant Treasurer and Accountant, Revenue Department, Gibraltar.
- James Edward Todd Brathwaite, Chief Inland Revenue Officer, Grenada, Windward Islands.
- Florence Gaskin Browne. For Social welfare services in Barbados.
- John Fisher, Chief Fire Officer, Ministry of the Interior, Iraq.
- Captain Francis George Leopold Holland, Headmaster, Educational Scheme, Gilbert and Ellice Islands Colony, Western Pacific.
- Cyril Charles Arnold Jansz, Manager and Principal of St. John's College, Panadura; for services to education in Ceylon.
- Audrey Jeffers. For social welfare services in Trinidad.
- Arnold Robert Johnson, lately Senior District Engineer, Federated Malay States Railways.
- Henry Meaden, Magistrate-Warden of Tobago, Colony of Trinidad and Tobago.
- Lilian Mary Single; West African Nursing Staff, Matron, Nigeria.
- Arthur James Stone, Registrar of the High Court and Administrator-General, Nyasaland Protectorate.
- George Alves Vincent Medical Superintendent, St. Ann's Lunatic Asylum, Trinidad.
- Alfred Whittaker, lately Collector of Revenue, Wei-hai-Wei.

=== Members of the Order of the Companions of Honour (CH) ===
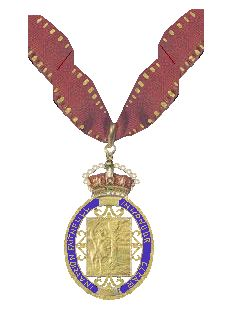
The riband and badge of the Companions of Honour

- Helena Maria Swanwick. First President, Women's International League (British Section). Formerly British Delegate to the Assembly of the League of Nations.
- Jane Harriett Walker JP Founder and Medical Superintendent of the East Anglian Sanatorium, Nayland, Suffolk. Founder and first President of the Medical Women's Federation.

=== Kaisar-i-Hind Medal ===
First Class

- Mary Ronald Bisset in charge Zenana Baptist Mission Hospital, Bhiwani, Punjab.
- Evelyn Gedge, Head of the Settlement for University Women, Gamdevi, Bombay.
- Ellen Inglis, Social Servant of Church Missionary Society, Punjab. Sarala Ray MBE Bengal.
- Mary Daphne, Lady Stephenson, Bihar and Orissa.
- Mohamed Ayoob, alias U Shwe Yun MBE Government Prosecutor, President, Municipal Committee, and chairman, District Council, Mergui, Burma.
- Frank Howard Oakley, Senior Partner of Messrs. Oakley, Bowden and Company, Madras.
- Graham Colville Ramsay OBE Tea-garden Doctor, at present employed on malarial research work by the Ross Institute, Assam.
- The Reverend Harry Hanson Weak Mission, Garhwal, United Provinces.
- The Venerable Archdeacon Edward Hamilton Whitley, Missionary of the Society for the Propagation of the Gospel, Archdeacon of Chota Nagpur, Bihar and Orissa.

=== Air Force Cross ===
- Squadron Leader John Allan Cecil Wright TD (Auxiliary Air Force).
- Flight Lieutenant Gilbert Edward Nicholetts.
- Flight Lieutenant Edward Simeon Colbeck Davis.

=== Air Force Medal ===
- Sergeant Alfred Victor Bax.

=== King's Police Medal (KPM) ===
England and Wales

- Lieutenant-Colonel Herbert Charles Metcalfe DSO Chief Constable of Somerset.
- Captain John Alfred Unett DSO Chief Constable of Essex.
- Frederick James Crawley, Chief Constable, Newcastle upon Tyne City Police Force.
- Arthur Robert Ellerington, Chief Constable, St. Helens Borough Police Force.
- Major Cedric Valentine Godfrey OBE Chief Constable, Salford City Police Force.
- Owen Cyrenius Webb, Superintendent, Metropolitan Police Force.
- William Trigg MBE Chief Superintendent and Deputy Chief Constable, Lincolnshire Constabulary.
- James Taylor Burnett MBE Chief Superintendent, Birmingham City Police Force.
- William Kenyon, Superintendent, Lancashire Constabulary.
- Charles Matthew Turner, Superintendent, Bradford City Police Force.
- William Burnham Fair, Chief Inspector, Metropolitan Police Force.
- George Charles Colvin, Sergeant, Metropolitan Police Force.
- Frederick George Muggridge, Sergeant, Metropolitan Police Force.
- James Dunsmore Adamson, Constable, Metropolitan Police Force.
- Robert Henry Baker, Constable, Metropolitan Police Force.
- John Laidlaw Bertram, Constable, Metropolitan Police Force.
- Alexander McLeod Irvine, Constable, Metropolitan Police Force.
- Ernest Jacobi, Constable, Metropolitan Police Force.
- Alfred Charles James, Constable, Metropolitan Police Force.
- Thomas Jack Kenwood, Constable, Metropolitan Police Force.
- Robert Henry Minnis, Constable, Metropolitan Police Force.
- Dennis Henry Murphy, Constable, Metropolitan Police Force.
- Walter Ernest Raymond, Constable, Metropolitan Police Force.
- John Charles McCarthy, Constable, Bedfordshire Constabulary.
- Robert Merchant, Constable, Essex Constabulary.
- Tom James Smith, Chief Officer, St. Austell (Volunteer) Fire Brigade.
- Arthur Henry Drake, Chief Officer, Coventry Fire Brigade.
- Joseph James Moore, Senior Superintendent, London Fire Brigade.

His Majesty Has also graciously consented to the King's Police Medal being handed to the next-of-kin of the undermentioned officer, who was killed on duty on the 14th December, 1930, and would have received the decoration had he survived

- Robert Little, Sergeant, Durham Constabulary.

Scotland

- Captain Duncan Finlayson OBE Chief Constable of Ross and Cromarty.
- Angus MacKinnon, Superintendent, Glasgow City Police Force.
- Sinclair Mackay, Superintendent, Dumbartonshire Constabulary.
- George McKay, Constable, Glasgow City Police Force.

Northern Ireland

- William Charles Foster, Constable, Royal Ulster Constabulary.

Australia

- Daniel Leo Beaty, Foot Constable, South Australian Police Force.
- William Lancelot Dohoney, Foot Constable, South Australian Police Force.
- Frederick Hector Lee, Motor Traffic Constable, South Australian Police Force.
- John Albert Robertson, Motor Traffic Constable, South Australian Police Force.
- William Roy Denison, Motor Traffic Constable, South Australian Police Force.
- Russell Sylvester Moore Walters, Motor Traffic Constable, South Australian Police Force.
- Percy Edgcumbe Holloway, Motor Traffic Constable, South Australian Police Force.

Union of South Africa

- Samuel Hendrik White, Detective Constable, South African Police Force.
- Gerhardus Barend Walters, Constable, South African Police Force.

British India

- Sir Patrick Aloysius Kelly CIE Commissioner of Police, Bombay. (bar to the King's Police Medal)
- George John Adamson, Inspector, Calcutta Police. (bar to the King's Police Medal)
- Rai Sahib Jagdeo Prashad Singh, Subedar, Military Police, Bhagalpur. (bar to the King's Police Medal)
- Frederick Lionel Mullaly, Deputy Commissioner, Madras City Police.
- Rao Bahadur Mangalore Venkatappa, Assistant Commissioner, Madras City Police.
- Manikkam Michael Chelladurai, Officiating Inspector, Madras City Police.
- Eugene Roxton Upshon, Sub-Inspector, Madras City Police.
- Thomas Browning, Sergeant-Major, Madras City Police.
- Allan Walton, Sergeant, Madras City Police.
- Kalftyath Achutha Menon, Head Constable, Madras City Police.
- Vonamamula Narasimhalu Krishnaswami Nayudu, Constable, Madras City Police.
- Muhammad Lutfullah Hussain, Sowar, Madras City Police.
- Ghulam Mahomed Mohazir, Sub-Inspector, Madras City Police.
- Keshav Bhimrao Bendigeri, Head Constable, Great Indian Peninsula Railway Police.
- Tom Robinson, Officiating District Superintendent of Police, Bombay Presidency.
- Paul Burgman Wilkins, Assistant Superintendent, Bombay Police.
- Charles Henry de Vere Moss, Assistant Superintendent, Bombay Police.
- John Cotton Farmer, Deputy Inspector-General, Bengal Police.
- Daniel Mulcahy, Sergeant, Calcutta Police.
- Frederick Harry Burr, Sergeant, Calcutta Police.
- Felix O'Hara, Sergeant, Calcutta Police.
- Manindra Chandra Pal, Constable, Bengal Police.
- Jadu Nandan Singh, Constable, Eastern Bengal and Assam-Bengal Railways Police.
- Archibald Douglas Gordon, Deputy Commissioner of Police, Calcutta.
- Frederick William Kidd, Superintendent of Police, Midnapore, Bengal.
- Promode Mohan Chakrabartti, Officiating Deputy Superintendent of Police, Intelligence Branch, Criminal Investigation Department, Bengal.
- Yakub Ali Khan, Constable, Bengal Police.
- Pir Khan, Constable, United Provinces Police.
- Munshi Mahmud-ul-Hasan, Sub-Inspector, United Provinces Police.
- Horace Williamson CIE MBE Indian Police Service, United Provinces.
- Sayed Ahmad Shah, Inspector, Punjab Police.
- Ram Chand, Constable, Punjab Police.
- Abdul Karim, Constable, Punjab Police.
- Alam Khan, Constable, Punjab Police.
- Ronald Arthur Charles Hill, Superintendent, Punjab Police.
- Ali Muhammad Shah, Constable, Punjab Police.
- Nasib Khan, Constable, Punjab Police.
- Najabat Ali, Constable, Punjab Police.
- Captain Lewis Eric MacGregor Burma Military Police.
- Chanan Khan, Constable, Burma Police.
- Godwin Edward Banwell MC Officiating Superintendent, Burma Police.
- Henry Raymond Alexander, Superintendent, Burma Police.
- Brij Behari Lai, Sub-Inspector, Bihar and Orissa Police.
- Francis Steuart McNamara, Deputy Inspector-General, Bihar and Orissa Police.
- Ram Sarup Singh, Constable, Bihar and Orissa Police.
- Rambilas Singh, Constable, Bihar and Orissa Police.
- Robert Douglas Kiallmark Ninnis, Superintendent, Bihar and Orissa Police.
- Malcolm Ayres Mackenzie MBE Superintendent, Bihar and Orissa Police.
- Ganesh, Constable, Central Provinces Police.
- Bhagirath, Constable Central Provinces Police.
- Charles Carter Chitham, Deputy Inspector-General, Central Provinces Police.
- Archibald Gifford Scott, Superintendent, Central Provinces Police.
- Eric Fitzroy Neilson, Superintendent, Central Provinces Police.
- Harold Beaumont, Superintendent of Police, Sylhet, Assam.
- Bashir Ahmed Khan, Inspector, North-West Frontier Province Police.
- Nawab, Constable, North-West Frontier Province Railway Police.
- Raz Muhammad Khan (Tarakzai Mohmand), Jemadar, North-West Frontier Province Constabulary.
- Lal Din (Tarakzai Mohmand), Naik, North-West Frontier Province Constabulary.
- Reginald Castelman Jeffreys, late Senior Superintendent, Delhi Police.
- Muhammad Afzal, Foot Constable, Delhi Police.
- Sardar Ragibhir Singh, Inspector-General of Police, Patiala State.

His Majesty Has also graciously consented to the King's Police Medal being handed to the next-of-kin of the undermentioned officer, who was killed on duty on the 14th December, 1930, and would have received the decoration had he survived:

- Sharfuddin, Constable, United Provinces Police.

Colonies, Protectorates and Mandated Territories

- Ernest Gilbert, Sergeant, Civil Police Force, Gibraltar.
- Walter Kent, Assistant Superintendent, Hong Kong Police.
- Carmelo Maria Saliba, Inspector, Malta Police.
- Muttugalage Don Warliano, Constable, Ceylon Police.
- J. N. Jordan, Constable, Northern Rhodesia Police.

=== British Empire Medal (BEM) ===
Military Division
For Gallantry

- Able Seaman George Willet Harrison. Citation: "On the occasion of a bad accident that occurred on board H.M.S. Hood at Portsmouth on the 15th February, 1930, when Dockyard workmen were engaged in opening up for inspection the starboard after bulge compartments, a Shipwright named Langford entered through the manhole into a compartment contaminated with carbon monoxide and was overcome and collapsed. He was alive when brought out but died without recovering consciousness. As soon as the alarm was given a rescue party entered the bulge, but found great difficulty in locating Langford owing to the very bad atmosphere and the absence of effective lighting. The party had gas-masks but these were ineffective against carbon monoxide gas. Notwithstanding these difficulties, however, Able Seaman Harrison made his way through successive compartments and at great personal risk, continued his search and, with assistance, eventually brought Langford out. On being brought out, Harrison himself was in a state of collapse."

For Meritorious Service

- Lance Corporal Lawrence Edward Cromey, 2nd Battalion, The Bedfordshire and Hertfordshire Regiment.
- Staff Sergeant Cecil Lockyer, Royal Army Ordnance Corps.
- Flight Sergeant Edward Victor Hibberd, Royal Air Force.

Civil Division
For Meritorious Service

- Henry Creed, Office Keeper in the Dominions Office and the Colonial Office.
- Thomas Greensmith, Inspector of Shipping, H.M. War Department Fleet.
- Sydney George Thomas Lane, Shipwright, H.M. Dockyard, Portsmouth.
- James McManus, Shipwright, H.M. Dockyard, Portsmouth.
- Alfred John Prince, Head Gardener and Caretaker, Imperial War Graves Commission, Belgium.
- William Webster, Inspector, Edinburgh City Police Force.
- Bertram O'Brien, Inspector of Police, Madras City, Madras.
- George Thomas Richard Smith, Officiating Inspector of Police, in charge of Armed Reserve, Madras City, Madras.
- Muhammad Ghouse Chida Sahib Bahadur, Inspector of Police, Madras.
- M. Muhammad Sadiq, Sub-Inspector of Police, Punjab.
- Nanak Chand, Sub-Inspector of Police, Punjab.
- Hasan Tahsin, Chief Cavass at H.M. Consulate General at Smyrna.

=== Royal Red Cross (RRC) ===
Second Class

- Superintending Sister Nora Evelyn James.
