= Ralph Griffith =

Ralph Griffith may refer to:

- Ralph T. H. Griffith (1826–1906), scholar of indology
- Ralph Griffith (Indian Army officer) (1882–1963), administrator in British India
- Ralph Griffiths (c.1720–1803), English journal editor and publisher
- Ralph A. Griffiths, historian and academic
