= Norman Bolton =

British civil servant

Sir Norman Bolton KCIE CSI
- Born: Horatio Norman Bolton; 1 February 1875; West Bromwich, Staffordshire, England
- Died: 24 May 1965 (aged 90); Depwade, Norfolk, England
- Education: Corpus Christi College, Oxford
- Occupation: Civil servant

Sir Horatio Norman Bolton KCIE CSI (1 February 1875 – 24 May 1965) was a British civil servant in British India. He twice served as the Chief Commissioner of the North-West Frontier Province from 1923 until 1925 and again from 1926 until 1930.

He was educated at Rossall School and Corpus Christi College, Oxford. He entered the Indian Civil Service in 1897 and was sent to Punjab the next year. He spent nearly his entire career in Peshawar, and was serving as Chief Commissioner during the 1920 uprising of the Pashtuns under Abdul Ghaffar Khan. He returned to England in 1930 due to ill health. He retired the next year.

He was appointed a Companion of the Order of the Indian Empire in 1916, a Commander of the Order of the Star of India in 1918 and knighted in the Order of the Indian Empire in 1926.

In 1911, he married Fanny Ethel Francis (née Mansfield), daughter of the late Captain James Charles Henry Mansfield. They had one daughter. He died in Depwade, Norfolk, aged 90.

Government offices
Preceded by Sir John Loader Maffey	Chief Commissioner of the North-West Frontier Province; July 1923 - 3 December 1925	Succeeded by William John Keen
Preceded by William John Keen	Chief Commissioner of the North-West Frontier Province; August 1926 - 10 May 1930	Succeeded by Sir Steuart Pears
