= Ralph Griffith (Indian Army officer) =

British colonial administrator (1882–1963)

Sir Ralph Edwin Hotchkin Griffith KCSI CIE (4 March 1882 – 11 December 1963) was an administrator in British India. Griffith was the last Chief Commissioner and the first Governor of the North-West Frontier Province.

== Education and early career ==
Ralph Edwin Hotchkin Griffith was the younger brother of Sir Francis Griffith and the son of Francis Robert Griffith (1828–1901). He was educated at Blundell's School and the Royal Military College. He was commissioned into the Middlesex Regiment as a second lieutenant on 8 May 1901, was promoted to lieutenant on 4 February 1903, and transferred to the Indian Army and the 26th Prince of Wales's Own Light Cavalry later the same year. He was appointed Adjutant of the Governor's Body Guard, Bombay from 1907 to 1908.

Griffith joined the Indian Political Service (which was then recruited half and half from the Indian Army and the Indian Civil Service) in November 1908. and served an apprenticeship under Sir George Roos-Keppel, who, like him, was a fluent speaker of Pashto. He was promoted Captain in 1910 and Major in 1916.

His early positions included Deputy Commissioner of Peshawar, secretary to the head of the Province, and Resident in the turbulent region of Waziristan, where his influence and understanding of the Wazir tribesmen reduced tensions in the area.

When Assistant Political Agent, Mohmand he was mentioned in dispatches for services on the North West Frontier during the early part of World War I.

== Governor of the North-West Frontier Province ==
Griffith succeeded Sir Steuart Pears as Chief Commissioner of the North-West Frontier Province in 1931. He became the first Governor in 1932, when the importance of the northern shield was recognised by the raising of the status of the Pashtun land to that of a Governor's province. He was Governor until 1937, during the formative inter-war period.

Griffith was appointed a Companion of the Order of the Indian Empire in 1917, promoted to Lieutenant-Colonel in 1927, and was made Knight Commander of the Order of the Star of India in 1932.

== Sources ==
- Obituary, Lt-Col. Sir Ralph Griffith, The Times, 13 December 1963; p. 17; Issue 55883; column D

Political offices
Preceded by Sir Steuart Pears	Chief Commissioner of the North-West Frontier Province; 1931–1932	Succeeded by abolished
Preceded by -	Governor of the North-West Frontier Province; 1932–1937	Succeeded by Sir George Cunningham
