= John Stuart Donald =

- Born: 1 September 1861; Ferozepore, India
- Died: 30 July 1948 (aged 86); Cyprus
- Occupation: British Indian government service
- Spouse: Henrietta Mary Ommanney

Sir John Stuart Donald KCSI CIE (1 September 1861 – 1948) served as the Chief Commissioner of the North West Frontier Province of British India from 1913 till 1915.

== Early life ==
Donald was born in Ferozepore, India to parents Alexander John Stuart Donald and Suzanna Britain Hilliard. He received an education at Bishop Cotton School in Shimla.

== Career ==
In 1882, Donald joined the Punjab Provincial Civil Service. During his first seven years, he was engaged in magisterial and executive duties. In 1889 he was appointed an assistant to Sir Robert Sandeman who was opening up communications within the regions of Balochistan, Waziristan and the Punjab. In 1890 Donald was put in charge of the newly opened Gomal Pass in South Waziristan. By autumn of that year, he was attached to the Shirani Field Force of the Zhob Expedition which earned him a "Mention in Despatches" distinction.

In recognition of these services, he was appointed to the Imperial Civil Service. In August 1893, he accompanied Sir H. Mortimer Durand on a mission to Kabul for negotiations with the Emir of Afghanistan on the Afghan-India border dispute. For this work he was awarded the C.I.E. and given the Afghan decoration Izzat-i-Afghanianda ceremonial sword by the Emir.

Donald spoke fluent Punjabi (language of his birthplace), Waziri Pashtu and other dialects. This enabled him to speak and negotiate directly with tribal leaders, which was beneficial in establishing relationships. He spent 1897 in Moscow studying the Russian language and then moved to London to become a qualified interpreter at the Civil Service Examinations.

He returned to India to spend the next few years in appointments on the North West Frontier. In 1903 he served as British Commissioner on the Anglo-Afghan Boundary Commission. This led to his appointment in 1908 to the newly established civil administrative position as Resident in Waziristan. In 1911, he was awarded the C.S.I. He was appointed Chief Commissioner and Agent to the Governor General in the North-West Frontier Province. From 1913-1915 he was an additional Member of the Imperial Legislative Council of India, and was knighted with the award of the K.C.S.I. In 1917 he was sent back to Waziristan to negotiate a peace settlement among tribes in the area. He retired in April, 1920 and settled in England.

== Personal life ==
Donald had five brothers who all served the government in India in various capacities. Douglas Donald C.S.I., C.I.E., C.B.E. became Deputy Inspector General of the Punjab Police. Duncan Donald K.P.M., O.B.E. was a District Superintendent of Police. Ranald Donald served in the Punjab Judiciary. William Donald served in the Public Works Department. Charles Hilliard Donald was Warden of the Punjab Game and Fisheries Department and was the author of several books on wildlife in India.

Sir John married Henrietta Mary Ommanney, daughter of Colonel Edward Lacon Ommanney C.S.I., in 1905 in London. They had two sons and two daughters.

Government offices
Preceded by George Roos-Keppel	Chief Commissioner of the North-West Frontier Province; 28 August 1913 – 28 January 1915	Succeeded by George Roos-Keppel
