= List of chief commissioners of the North-West Frontier Province =

Below is a list of chief commissioners of the North-West Frontier Province (NWFP) of British India, from the creation of the office in 1901 until 1932.

== Chief Commissioners of the North-West Frontier Province ==
- 9 November 1901–7 July 1908: Sir Harold Arthur Deane
- 8 July 1908–10 September 1919: Sir George Olof Roos-Keppel
- 16 November 1909–31 October 1910: William Rudolph Henry Merck (acting for Roos-Keppel)
- 28 August 1913–28 January 1915: Sir John Stuart Donald (acting for Roos-Keppel)
- 10 September 1919–8 March 1921: Sir Hamilton Grant
- 8 March 1921–1 July 1923: Sir John Loader Maffey
- 1 July 2023–10 May 1930: Horatio Norman Bolton (acting to Dec 1924)
- 3 December 1925–1 August 1926: William John Keen (acting for Bolton)
- 10 May 1930–9 September 1931: Sir Steuart Edmund Pears
- 10 September 1931–18 April 1932: Sir Ralph Griffith (became the first Governor of the province in 1932)
