= Gertrude Humphrys =

Dame Gertrude Mary, Lady Humphrys (1882–1973)

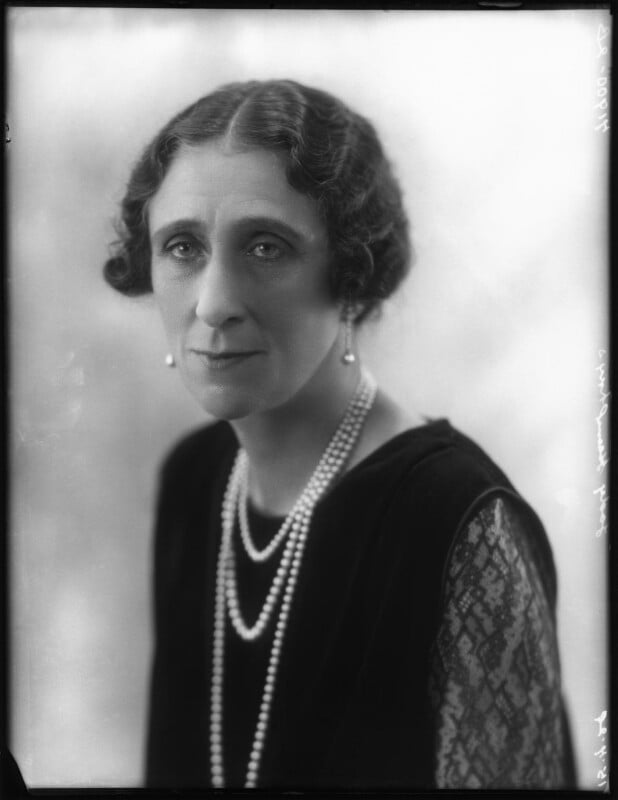
Gertrude Mary Humphrys in 1929

Dame Gertrude Mary Humphrys, Lady Humphrys, DBE (née Deane; 7 October 1882 – 25 January 1973) was a British Dame Commander of the Order of the British Empire.

Born in Punjab, British India, the daughter of Colonel Sir Harold Deane, she was known informally as "Gertie". In 1907, she married diplomat and cricketer Sir Francis Humphrys in Peshawar. Her husband was knighted in 1924. Sir Francis served as British Minister in Afghanistan. Lady Humphrys was appointed Dame Commander of the Order of the British Empire in the 1929 Birthday Honours for her services in Kabul during the Afghan Civil War, including the Kabul airlift, during which she briefly acted as a midwife.

Her husband died in 1971. Lady Humphrys died in 1973 in Hamstead Marshall, Berkshire, aged 90.
