= Reginald Skelton =

Royal Navy admiral (1872–1956)

Engineer Vice-Admiral Sir Reginald William Skelton KCB CBE DSO (3 June 1872 – 5 September 1956) was a British vice-admiral and engineer who served as chief engineer and official photographer of the 1901–1904 Discovery Expedition to Antarctica.

== Early life ==
Skelton was born at Long Sutton, Lincolnshire, and educated at Bromsgrove School, Worcestershire. He joined the Royal Navy in 1887 and until 1892 studied at the Royal Naval Engineering College at Keyham, Devon. Once commissioned he served on HMS Centurion in China from 1894 to 1897 and HMS Majestic of the Channel Squadron from 1899 to 1900 before being appointed to supervise the building of the Discovery for the 1901 National Antarctic Expedition.

== Polar exploration ==
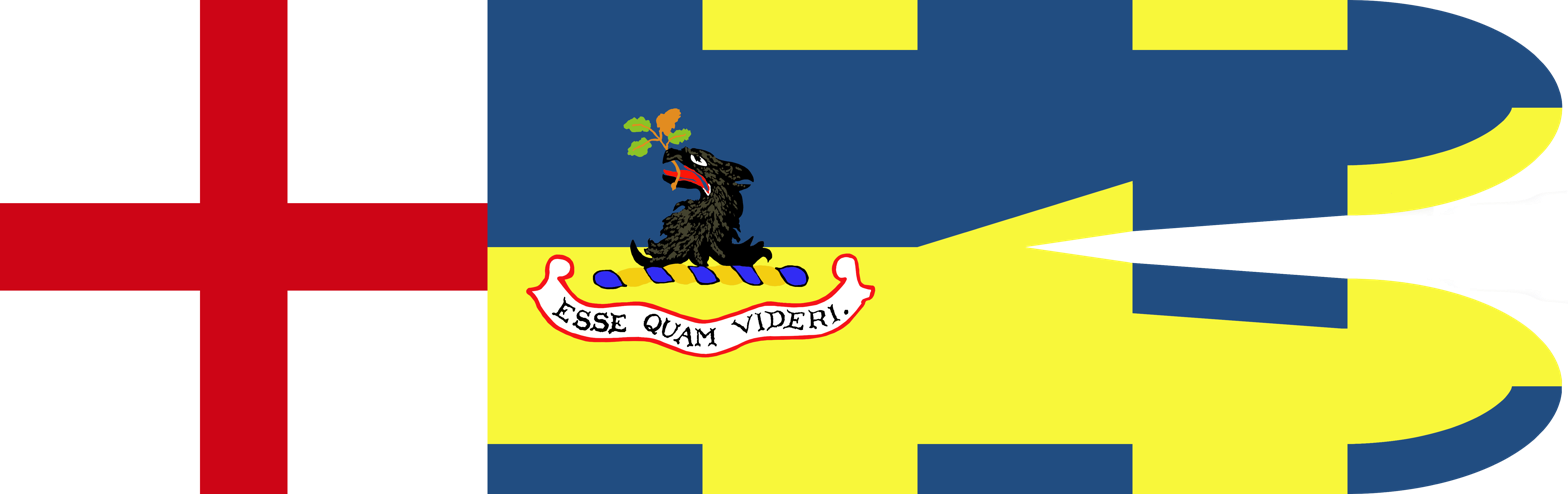
Sledge flag used by Skelton in Antarctica during the Discovery Expedition

Scott, the expedition leader, had been impressed with Skelton's engineering abilities aboard the Majestic and so he was appointed Chief Engineer of the expedition. He also acted as expedition photographer. Nicknamed 'Skelly', there were no serious difficulties with any of the machinery under Skelton's care throughout the three-year expedition. Once established on the continent he became a well-respected member of the team (Huxley 1978), eventually having four features named after him: an inlet, a glacier, an icefall and a lévé.

On his return he married his fiancée, the New Zealander Sybil Devenish-Meares of Christchurch: they had two daughters and a son.

== Later life ==
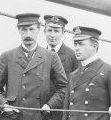
Officers of the 'Discovery' on the 1901–1904 British Antarctic Expedition. From left: Reginald Koettlitz, Reginald Skelton, Robert Falcon Scott

From 1906 to 1912 and again between 1916 and 1918, Skelton served in the submarine service. He hoped to be Scott's second-in-command for the Terra Nova Expedition of 1910–1913 but was overlooked in favour of Edward Evans who had been planning his own expedition to Antarctica but agreed to join Scott's expedition provided he was offered the position of second-in-command. During the First World War Skelton was awarded the DSO for his actions at the Battle of Jutland, 31 May 1916. Appointed CB in 1919 for his work in North Russia, he continued to rise through the service after the War, being posted to Archangel, Constantinople, to the Mediterranean Station and to the Atlantic Station. He became Engineer Rear-Admiral in 1923, Engineer Vice-Admiral in 1928 and Engineer-in-Chief of the Fleet, Admiralty, 1928–32. He was knighted in the 1931 New Year Honours. and retired in 1932.

He died in 1956, aged 84, at his home in Aldingbourne.

== Legacy ==
Skelton was portrayed by Cliff Burnett in the 1985 Central Television serial The Last Place on Earth.

== Bibliography ==
- Obituary by Michael Barne The Geographical Journal, Vol. 122, No. 4 (Dec., 1956), pp. 533–534
- Scott Fiennes, R. (2003 London Coronet) ISBN 0340826991
- Scott of the Antarctic Huxley, E.J.G (1978 London, Atheneum) ISBN 0689108613
- Discovery Illustrated J V Skelton, J.V. & Wilson, D.W. (2001). Reardon Publishing. ISBN 1-873877-48-X
- The Antarctic Journals of Reginald Skelton: Skelton, J.V. (Ed) (2004, Reardon Publishing). ISBN 1873877684
