= Francis Griffith (police officer) =

British police chief

Sir Francis Charles Griffith CSI OBE (9 November 1878 – 16 November 1942) was a British police chief. He served as Inspector-General of the Bombay Police and later became Chief Constable of the New Scotland Yard.

Griffith was born in Hyderabad, British India, the son of British civil servant Francis Robert Griffith (1828 – 1901) and his wife Henrietta (née Sherman). He was the older brother of Sir Ralph Griffith, the first governor of the North West Frontier Province. He was educated at Blundell's School in Tiverton before joining the Indian Police Service at age 20.

He worked nine years as a district officer in the Bombay Presidency, then served as assistant to the Inspector-General of the Presidency. In 1919, he was appointed Police Commissioner of Bombay and three years later became Inspector-General of Bombay.

Griffith was made an Officer of the Order of the British Empire in 1917 and a Companion of the Order of the Star of India in 1923. He was knighted in 1931 before retirement from the Bombay Police. He returned to England and was appointed as Chief Constable, New Scotland Yard. He was subsequently transferred to the War Office for special work during the Second World War, but was forced to retire due to ill health.

He died in Oxford in 1942, a week after his 64th birthday. He was survived by his wife, Ivy Morna (née Jacob; whom he married in 1906 in Bristol), a son and daughter.
