= Francis Humphrys =

British cricketer, colonial administrator and diplomat

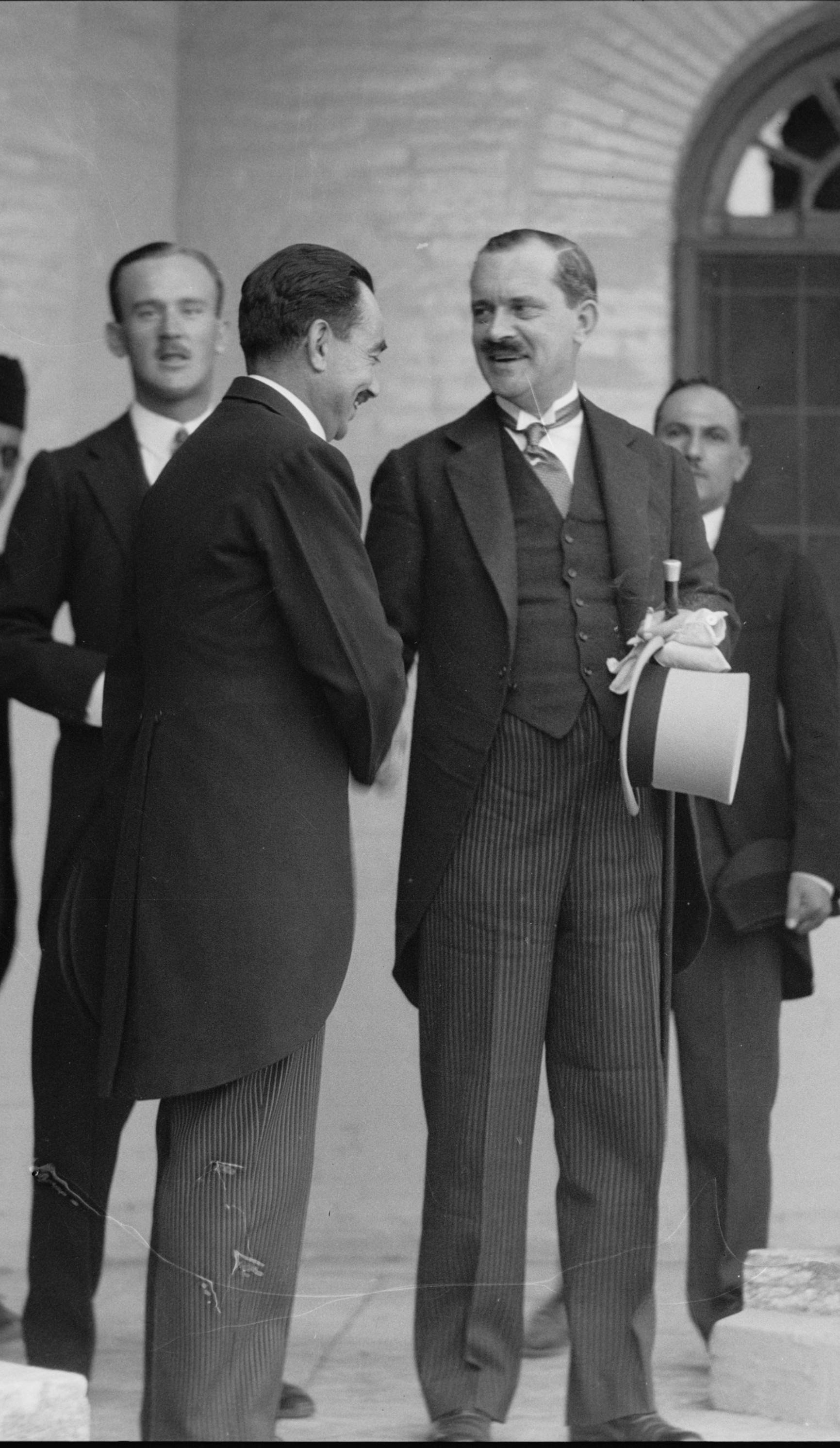
Celebration of Iraq becoming member of the League of Nations, 6 October 1932. Baghdad. Sir Francis Humphrys, British Ambassador, taking leave of the King's Chamberlain at the Palace

Lieutenant Colonel Sir Francis Henry Humphrys, GCMG, GCVO, KBE, CIE (24 April 1879 – 28 August 1971) was a British cricketer, colonial administrator and diplomat.

== Early life and cricket ==
Francis Henry Humphrys was born in Shropshire, at Beatrice Street, Oswestry, where his father was assistant master at Oswestry School. He was educated at Shrewsbury School, where he was captain of cricket and head of the school, and Christ Church, Oxford, where he played first-class cricket for Oxford University. His first-class debut came against the touring Australians in 1899. He played 3 further first-class matches in 1900, the last coming against Sussex. In his 4 first-class matches, he took 13 wickets at a bowling average of 19.46, with best figures of 4/16. While at school, and later, he also played Minor Counties Championship cricket for Wiltshire.

== Career ==
After graduating from Oxford in 1900, Humphrys joined the Worcestershire Regiment and served in the Second Boer War. Following the war he was in February 1902 seconded to the Indian Staff Corps, and in October the same year he left his regiment and was transferred to the Indian Army. He was seconded to the Political Service and spent most of this part of his career in the North-West Frontier Province, although in 1918, towards the end of the First World War he returned to Europe and served with a temporary commission in the newly formed Royal Air Force. In 1919 he returned to India, first as a political agent and then, in 1921, as deputy Foreign Secretary in the Government of India. He was appointed a Commander of the Order of the Indian Empire (CIE) in the 1920 Birthday Honours.

Following the Anglo-Afghan "Treaty of Kabul" of 22 November 1921, in early 1922 Humphrys was appointed the first British Minister to the Amir of Afghanistan, Amānullāh Khān. In November 1928 a rebellion began in Jalalabad and tribal forces marched on Kabul, and in early 1929 Humphrys supervised the evacuation by air of several hundred Europeans in what became known as the Kabul Airlift. In the House of Commons on 4 February the Foreign Secretary, Austen Chamberlain, commended both Humphrys and his wife for their "courage and fortitude". In the 1929 Birthday Honours Humphrys was given the additional knighthood of Knight Commander of the Order of St Michael and St George (KCMG)

Later in 1929 Humphrys was appointed to be High Commissioner in the Kingdom of Iraq, then under British administration. Following the Anglo-Iraqi Treaty (1930), which Humphrys signed for the United Kingdom, on 3 October 1932 Iraq became an independent kingdom and Humphrys became the first British Ambassador to Iraq.

In 1935 Humphrys retired from the diplomatic service and was appointed chairman of a Sugar Tribunal, which resulted in the creation of the British Sugar Corporation, of which he was chairman from its formation from 1936 to 1949. He was also the director of several other companies and was the chairman of the Iraq Petroleum Company from 1941 to 1950.

== Family ==
In 1907 Humphrys married Gertrude Mary Deane, known as "Gertie", elder daughter of Sir Harold Deane, Chief Commissioner of the North-West Frontier Province. They had a son and two daughters.

Humphrys died at a nursing home at Hamstead Marshall near Newbury, Berkshire in 1971, aged ninety-two. Lady Humphrys died in 1973.

== Honours ==
Francis Humphrys was knighted as a Knight Commander of the Order of the British Empire in the 1924 Birthday Honours, awarded the additional honours of Knight Grand Cross of the Royal Victorian Order (GCVO) in 1928 and Knight Commander of the Order of St Michael and St George in 1929, and promoted to Knight Grand Cross of the Order of St Michael and St George (GCMG) in the 1932 New Year Honours. Amānullāh Khān made him a member of the Nishan-i-Sardari (Order of the Leader), with the title of Sardar-i-ala, in 1928; the King of Iraq awarded him the Grand Cordon of the Wisam al-Rafidain (Order of the Two Rivers) in 1933.

== See also ==
- 1929 in Afghanistan
- British Mandate of Iraq

Diplomatic posts
New office	Envoy Extraordinary and Minister Plenipotentiary to His Majesty the Amir of Afghanistan; 1922–1929	Succeeded by Sir Richard Maconachie
Preceded by Sir Gilbert Clayton	High Commissioner for Iraq and Commander-in-Chief therein 1929–1932	Independence of Iraq
New office	Ambassador Extraordinary and Plenipotentiary to His Majesty the King of Iraq; 1932–1935	Succeeded by Sir Archibald Clark Kerr
