= William John Keen =

British Chief Commissioner during the British occupation of India

- Born: 1873
- Died: 1958 (aged 84–85)

Lieutenant-Colonel William John Keen, CIE, CBE, JP (1873 – 26 July 1958) served as the Chief Commissioner of the North-West Frontier Province of British India from 1925 until 1926.

Commissioned a second lieutenant in the British Army in 1892, he transferred to the Indian Army in 1894 and won promotion to lieutenant in 1895 and to Captain of the Indian Staff Corps on 19 November 1902. In 1910 he became a Major. He was appointed a CIE in 1915.

Government offices
Preceded by Horatio Bolton	Chief Commissioner of the North-West Frontier Province; 3 December 1925 – August 1926	Succeeded by Horatio Bolton
