= William Merk =

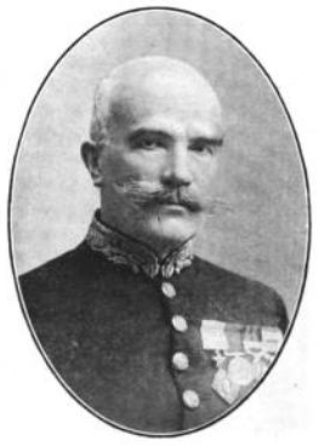
- Born: William Rudolph Henry Merk; 1852; Shimla, British India
- Died: 1925 (aged 72–73)

William Rudolph Henry Merk, CSI (12 December 1852 – 15 January 1925) was a British administrator in India who served as the Chief Commissioner of the North-West Frontier Province of British India from 1909 to 1910.

== Biography ==
William Merk was born in Shimla in 1852.

== Notes ==
Government offices
Preceded by George Roos-Keppel	Chief Commissioner of the North-West Frontier Province; 16 November 1909 – 1 November 1910	Succeeded by George Roos-Keppel
