= Frederick Minter =

English civil engineer (1887–1976)

Sir Frederick Minter
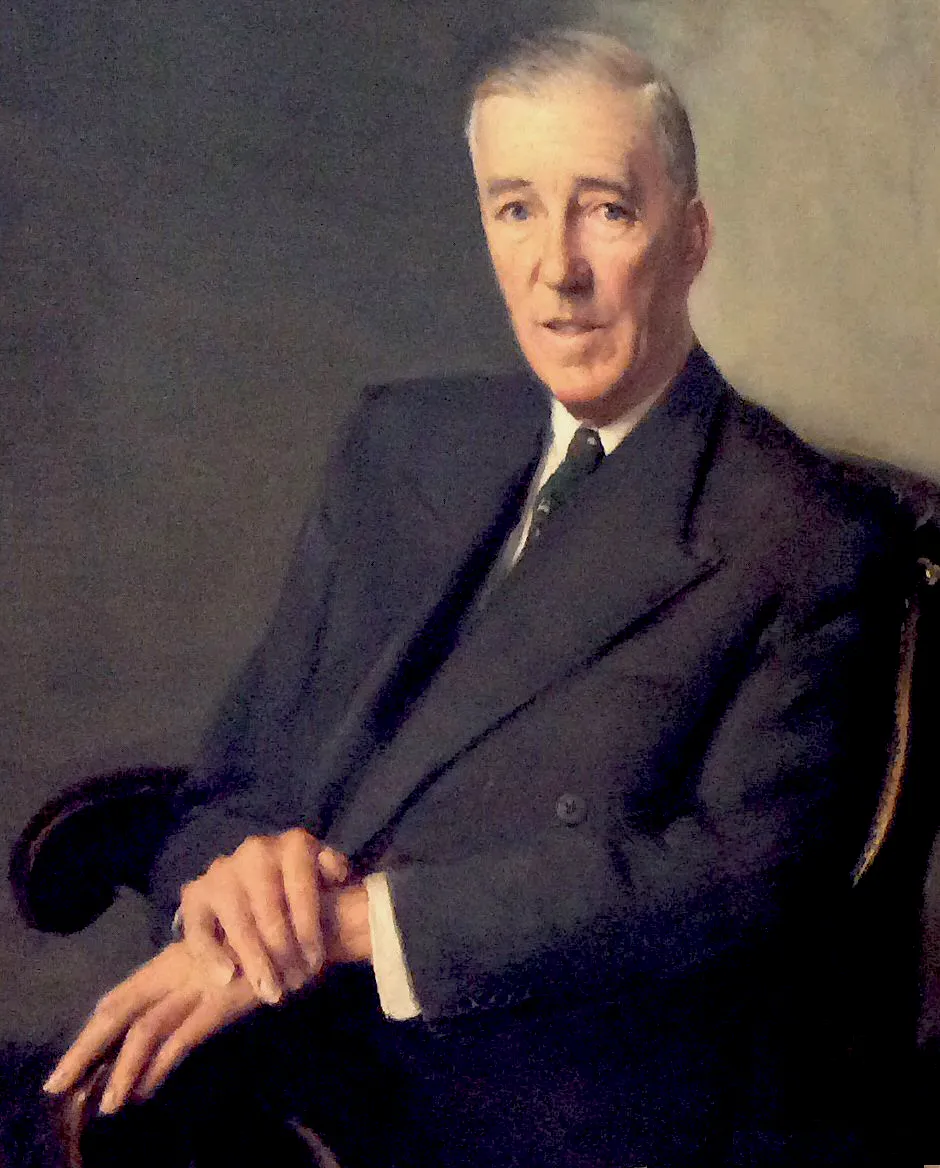
- Sir Frederick Albert Minter sitting for a portrait, shortly after being knighted by King George V, June 1935.
- Born: Frederick Albert Minter; July 11th 1887; Wandsworth, London, England
- Died: July 12th 1976 (aged 89); Warnford, Hampshire, England
- Occupation: Civil Engineer
- Years active: 1908 - 1976
- Relatives: Frederick George Minter (father) Miniminter (great-grandson)

Sir Frederick Albert Minter (11 July 1887 – 12 July 1976) was a British civil engineer most notable for his restoration of St George's Chapel, Windsor Castle in the 1930s. He was involved in numerous groups and organisations, and was Governor of his alma mater, Framlingham College (1937–67).

== Early life and education ==
Minter was born in Wandsworth, London, the son of Frederick George Minter of Suffolk and Sarah Gregory of Essex. His father was a surveyor on the Southern Railway who founded the building firm F. G. Minter in 1890 in Putney.

Minter was educated at Framlingham College from 1901–04, where he was a member of the football and shooting teams. He then travelled abroad to Egypt (where he worked on the Aswan Low Dam), Australia, and New Zealand (where he worked on the Otira Tunnel).

He served with the Royal Marines during the First World War as a captain, serving with the Submarine Miners of the Royal Engineers.

== Career ==
After the war, Minter joined F.G. Minter and worked on numerous projects, including many stores on Oxford Street. He was appointed managing director of the firm after his father's death in 1926.

Minter oversaw reconstructions including the Nottingham Exchange and Sadler's Wells Theatre; and new constructions of the Duchess Theatre (1929), the BBC's Broadcasting House, the LCC cottage estate at Roehampton (1935); and the Fleet Air Arm headquarters, Lee-on-Solent, His postwar structures included the Bracken House in the City of London (original headquarters of the Financial Times) and the wind tunnel at RAE Bedford.

Minter was most passionate about his work on the restoration of St George's Chapel in Windsor Castle and with Hector Bolitho, authored a book about the project in 1925, The King's Beasts. The restoration included the replacement of The King's Beasts, the 41 effigies originally erected on the pinnacles of St. George's by Henry VII. Sir Christopher Wren (1632–1723) had ordered the effigies removed in 1682 after condemning the Reigate Stone, the calcareous sandstone of which they were constructed. Wren, who recognized the effigies added structural integrity to the roof, had suggested replacing them with carved stone pineapples (in vogue at the time), but it was never done. More than two centuries later, Sir Harold Brakspear finally had recommended replacing the effigies as part of his restoration of the chapel. Minter's involvement began with his father, who generously offered to cover the costs of the effigies, which were carved in the firm's own building yard. He also contributed £4,000 (equivalent to £210,000 in 2025) to the St George's Chapel Restoration Fund.

After his father died, Minter continued the firm's involvement. He worked closely with architect Sir Charles Peers to install 76 new beasts of 14 types.

Minter's eldest son, Fred, was a chorister at St. George's School at Windsor Castle. The school, which dates to the 14th century, needed restoration and enlargement and Minter also defrayed the cost of his firm's involvement.

== Other roles ==
In addition to serving as justice of the peace for Surrey (1935-57), Minter held numerous charitable positions. He was chairman of The Royal Alexandra and Albert School (1952–63), chairman of the Board of Governors of Queen Charlotte's and Chelsea Hospital for Women, Governor of Framlingham College (1937–67), and vice president of the London Police Court Mission, honorary treasurer of the British Drama League, vice president of the Theatre Royal Windsor Trust, and vice president for the Association of Land and Property Owners. He was also a member of the Council for King Edward's Hospital Fund, a delegate to the British Commonwealth Relations Conference in Sydney in 1938, and a liveryman in Worshipful Company of Glaziers.

== Honours ==
For his work at Windsor, he was appointed Commander of the Royal Victorian Order in the 1931 New Year Honours, Knight Commander of the Royal Victorian Order in the 1935 Birthday Honours, and Knight Grand Cross of the Royal Victorian Order (GCVO) in the 1959 New Year Honours. He was the first engineer to be honoured as GCVO.

== Personal life ==
In 1912, he married Greeta Constance West, with whom he had three sons, born in 1916, 1922 and 1925 respectively. Lady Minter died in 1973. He died in 1976, the day after he had celebrated his 89th birthday. He was remembered in The Times as, "Quiet and courtly in manner and address, there can have been few who did so much for others or said so little." One of his great-grandsons is notable, being the YouTuber Miniminter.

== Bibliography ==
- Minter, Frederick A.; Bolitho, Hector (1925). The King's beasts: St. George's chapel, Windsor castle. London: Baynard Press.
