= Kashmir Smast =

Cave in Pakistan

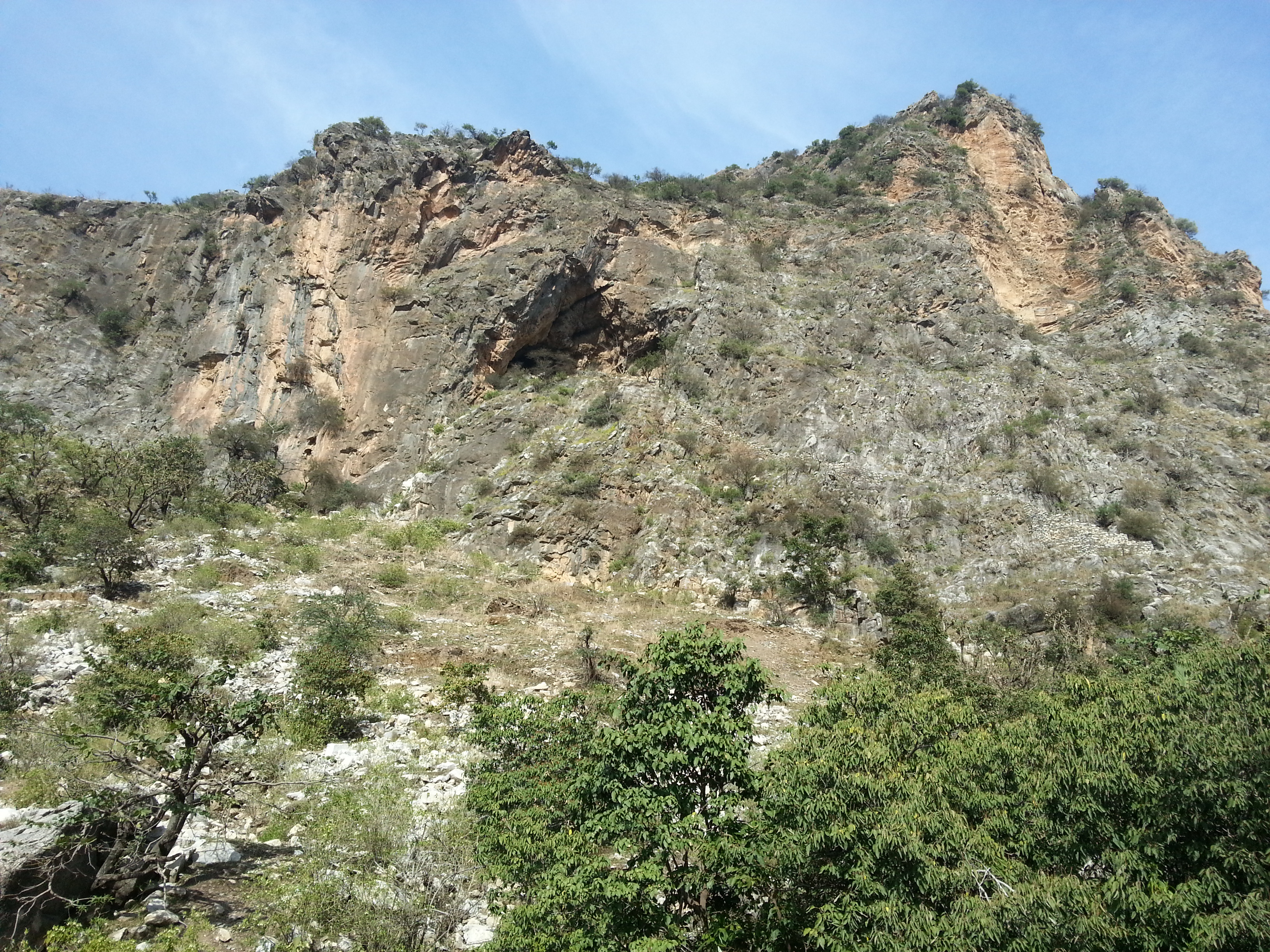
View of one of the caves from the Kashmir Smast

The Kashmir Smast (Pashto: کشمیر سمڅ) caves, also called Kashmir Smats, are a series of natural limestone caves, artificially expanded from the Kushan to the Shahi periods, situated in the Babuzai Sakrah mountains in the Katlang Valley Mardan in Northern Pakistan. According to recent scholarship based on a rare series of bronze coins and artifacts found in the region, the caves and their adjacent valley probably comprised a sovereign kingdom in Gandhara which maintained at least partial independence for almost 500 years, from c. 4th century AD to the 9th century AD. For most of its history, it was ruled by White Hun (or Hephthalite) governors or princes.

== Name ==
"Smast" is a mistranscription of the Pashto word for 'cave,' which is actually smats (Pashto: سمڅ).

As for "Kashmir", the Gazetteer of the Peshawar district 1897-1898 describes that “the name [Kashmir Smast] may be derived from the fact that the gorge here is fairly and picturesquely wooded, and this may have suggested Kashmir.” Another explanation is that according to legend, the network caves was so vast that it stretched from Gandhara to the kingdom of Kashmir.

== Description ==
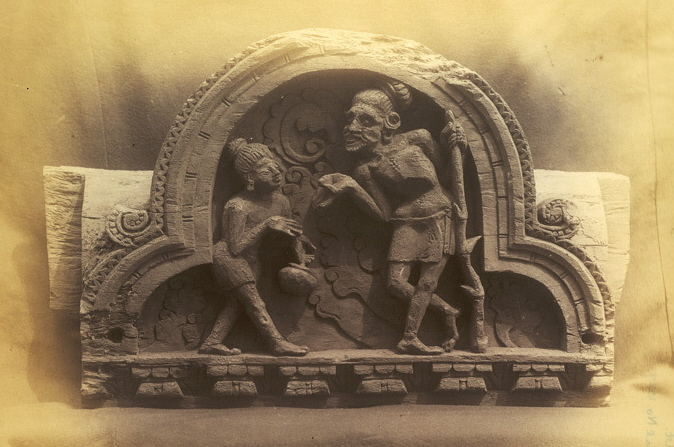
One of the wooden sculptured panels discovered by Major H.A. Deane in the 1880s that is now in the British Museum, 9th-10th centuries AD.

A number of the cells had wooden architectural interiors, carved with elaborate Hindu and Buddhist iconography. Examples of these panels can be found in the British Museum in London. Excavations at the Kashmir Smast site uncovered one of the most well organized town planning systems in ancient Gandhara.

Sir Alexander Cunningham in “The Ancient Geography of India” and in the “Archaeological Survey Reports” outlined the principal ancient sites in Gandhara, which at that time was part of the Yusufzai subdivision. Among the sites covered is the Kashmir Smast.

The Kashmir Smast sites are described by Cunningham as cave temples situated near the summit of the Sakri ridge of Pajja, and approached from the village in Babozai in the tappah Baezai, it can easily be approached from village Pirsai. Cunningham associated the Kashmir Smast with the cave of Prince Sudana in Mount Dantalok, described by the contemporary Chinese traveler Xuanzang.

A detailed discussion of the site in the Gazetteer of the Peshawar district 1897-1898 states the following:

“This cave has not been thoroughly explored yet… A little way below the level of the cave, and opposite, there are the ruins of a small city, the walls of which still stand and are in good preservation…”

“The cave is situated on a cliff looking towards the south-west below the ridge on which the Kashmir Burj stands. A road from Pirsai crosses the ridge, which is practicable for most of the distance for a good hill pony. Another footpath leads to Babozai direct from the cave…”

It goes on to describe the layout of the caves:

“There are three chambers in the limestone rock, of which the first two open into each other, and the third is reached by a winding flight of steps. The length of the first two chambers from the entrance is 322 feet (98 m), and the height of the first about 60, and of the second about 100 feet (30 m). The width of the first cave is 81 feet (25 m) and of the second 90 feet (27 m), and fully between them about 40 feet (12 m). The third cave is 80 feet (24 m) high, and above 80 feet (24 m) in diameter, with an opening in the roof which admits light and air, so that the air throughout is pure…”

“In the third cave there is a square temple built on a dome-shaped rock of stalagmite, which was evidently the holiest shrine. In the first cave there is an octagonal shrine just inside the entrance which contained a large wooden coffin, and in a similar shrine near the right wall some carved wooden plaques with figures of a fakir dancing and a woman giving flowers to the fakir, and portions of a wooden box were found. In the center room there is a large square shrine, and a water tank 13 feet (4.0 m) wide, 20 feet (6.1 m) long, and 10 feet (3.0 m) deep. About 100 feet (30 m) below the cave towards Babozai on a plateau there are remains of a considerable fort… The Kashmir Burj and another on a western spur of Pajja were also evidently outposts to guard this shrine. The entrance to the cave is difficult as the old masonry steps have fallen down and the cliff is very precipitous…”

“There are well built stone castles dating back to Buddhist times all along the northern hills. One near Saughar in Baezai is specially interesting, as the care taken to bring down in a small stone duct that scanty supply of water from a spring, which still exists in the hill above the castle or monastery, would seem to show that the water supply was not much more plentiful then than it is at present.”

What is being described here is an enclosed and fortified complex comprising a city and temples built into natural caves. The presence of walls and a water system serving the area would indicate a certain level of economic independence exerted in the region.

== Numismatic discoveries ==
A Bronze Personal Seal from the Kashmir Smast of Sri Randrokshi (Pakistan/ Gandhara, c. 375-400).

Image of a Hunnic Queen on a bronze coin of Kashmir Smast (Pakistan/ Gandhara, c. 375-400).

Given the fact that exact find data is not available for the coins of the Kashmir Smast, and that numerous symbols, legends, and images on the coins have come to light which have never before been encountered in 150 years of Hunnic numismatic study, the attribution and dating of these specimens becomes an arduous task. In the varieties of coins found in the Kashmir Smast, it becomes apparent that during the period of the Kidara, the Alxon, the Nazek, the Turk Shahis, and the Hindu Shahis, a minor kingdom based in this region maintained some level of autonomy from the greater Hunnic hordes which ruled Gandhara. This is evidenced by the use of hithertofore unrecorded images, stylistic peculiarities, and tamghas (royal symbols).

The bronze coins found in cave and its adjacent valley can be divided into seven groups:

1) Kushano-Sassanian. The hoard includes numerous Kushano-Sassanian bronzes of the dumpy fabric, including mostly known varieties in addition to unpublished fractionals, and a number of anonymous Hunnic imitations minted in the dumpy Kushano-Sassanian fabric.

2) Kidara. Kidarite coins in the hoard comprise the majority of unpublished specimens. The obverse of some varieties closely resemble, or are crudely rendered versions of, known Kidarite drachms. The busts portrayed on these coins are depicted wearing headdresses associated with particular Kidara princes, often in turn borrowed from contemporary Sassanian / Kushano-Sassanian monarchs. This group also includes thin AE units featuring bearded busts occasionally with Brahmi legends. As they are notably different from other recorded Kushano-Sassanian bronzes, they may be attributed to Kidarite governors or princes under Kushano-Sassanian or Sassanian sovereignty.

3) Alxon (or Alchon) Huns. The hoard includes a number of coins which are stylistically similar to the Alxon Hunnic series. Some feature the royal Hunnic tamgha, or royal symbol, most often associated with the first of the Alxon Hunnic kings in Gandhara, Khingila and his immediate successors.

4) Nezak. Common published Nazek bronzes abound in the hoard. In addition to these, a number of unpublished varieties with stylistic similarities to Nezak bronzes have also been discovered, notably featuring a trident tamgha.

5) Turk Shahi. These include small AE units imitating larger silver Turk Shahi drachms. They are either anepigraphic or feature Bactrian Greek legends.

6) The Shahi Kings of Kabul and Gandhara. This category includes coins stylistically similar to the coins of Samanta Deva and Spalapati Deva, characterized by linear stylized anthropomorphic or zoomorphic representations.

7) Anonymous coins which cannot be stylistically attributed to any particular Hunnic period or clan.

8) Bronze imitations of Bactrian drachms of Menander I and other dynasts.

== Political and monetary independence ==
Scholars contend that the bronze currency found in the region were issued by local semi-independent governors, or Tegins, in the Kashmir Smast valley, paying allegiance to the greater Hunnic Tegins of Gandhara and Bactria. The feudal and tribal nature of the ancient Central Asian' states allowed for substantial independence to be exercised by local governors.

It is worth noting that all the new varieties found in this area are small bronze pieces, varying in weight between 0.5 and 1.1 g. (referred to as the Kashmir Smast standard). They are occasionally small versions of more common drachms circulating in the region, or feature entirely new portraits/images with some or no resemblance to commonly circulating coins of the period.

Given the fact that these pieces have not been found elsewhere in Hunnic domains, we can infer that they were not considered acceptable currency outside of the Kashmir Smast region. However, imitating the coins of the contemporary rulers of Gandhara, and employing certain of their dynastic symbols and portraits, alongside a totally new set of portraits, names / titles, and symbols, may indicate that while they were issued independently for use in the local kingdom, the local rulers must have paid homage to and acknowledged their Hunnic overlords. The fact that they were allowed to use some of their own tamghas and titles and that the greater chiefs gave them the privilege of minting their own currency strengthens this argument. The minting of coins was a prerogative of the rulers, and carried with it a certain degree of governing authority. Numismatically speaking, this can be likened to the period of Hephthalite and Turk Shahi sovereignty over Sogdiana, during which civic bronze coinage circulated alongside silver drachms referencing a Hunnic or Turkic overlord (the Bukharkhoda). The fact that such independent issues continued throughout five separate dynasties, until the Hindu Shahi period, means that to a degree this principality maintained its status for perhaps as long as three to four hundred years.

== Literature ==
H.A. Deane, Note on Udyana and Gandhara. JRAS 1896, pp. 655–675.

H. Falk, A Copper Plate Donation Record and Some Seals from the Kashmir Smast. Beiträge zur Allgemeinen und Vergleichenden Archäologie 23 (2003), pp. 1–19.
