= Harold Arthur Deane =

British Army officer

Sir Harold Deane
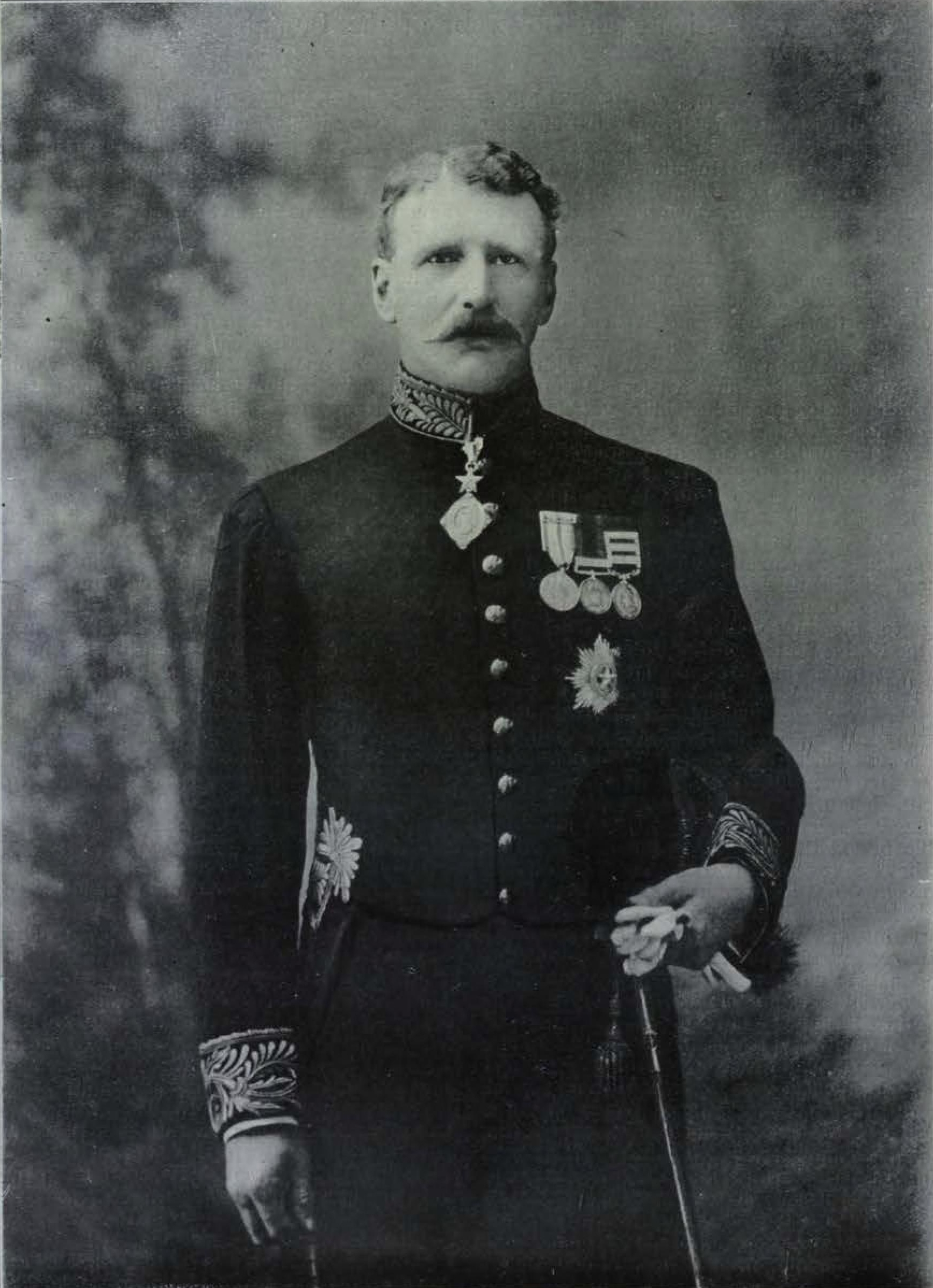
- Born: Harold Arthur Deane; 1 April 1854; Brighton, Sussex, England
- Died: 8 July 1908 (aged 54); London, United Kingdom
- Occupation: Colonial administrator
- Relatives: Gertrude, Lady Humphrys

Lieutenant-Colonel Sir Harold Arthur Deane KCSI (1 April 1854 – 8 July 1908) was an administrator in British India. Deane served as the first Political Agent of the Malakand in 1895 and also as the first Chief Commissioner of the North-West Frontier Province upon the creation of the province on 9 November 1901.

== Career ==
Deane was commissioned in 1874 and promoted to captain in 1885 and to Major in 1894. The following year he became the first Political Agent of the Malakand and in 1896 he was appointed a CSI and then promoted to Lieutenant-Colonel in 1900. In 1901 he became the Chief Commissioner of the North-West Frontier Province following its creation by Lord Curzon – a position he held until his death in 1908.

== Collection ==
Deanne's remarkable collection of Gandharan and ancient Buddhist and Hindu artefacts, including three rare wooden panels from the Kashmir Smast, is now held by the British Museum.

== Personal life ==
Deane married Mary Gertrude Roberts in 1880. Deane's daughters were Dame Gertrude Humphrys, wife of diplomat and cricketer Sir Francis Humphrys, and Alice Daisy, who married Major-General James Dick-Cunyngham. His son, Lt.-Col. Henry Harold Rookhurst Deane, also served in the Indian Army.

Deane fell ill in 1908 and returned to England, where he died two weeks later after being diagnosed with a brain tumor.

== Bibliography ==
- Llewelyn Morgan, Luca Maria Oliveri, The View from Malakand: Harold Deane’s ‘Note on Udyana and Gandhara’ (Oxford, 2022)

Political offices
Preceded by none	Political Agent of the Malakand; 1895	Succeeded by
Preceded by none	Chief Commissioner of the North-West Frontier Province; 9 November 1901 – 7 July 1908	Succeeded by Sir George Olof Roos-Keppel
