= Roberts baronets of Martholme (1931) =

Escutcheon of the Roberts baronets of Martholme

The Roberts Baronetcy, of Martholme in the County of Surrey, was created in the Baronetage of the United Kingdom on 29 January 1931 for George Roberts. The title became extinct on his death in 1950.

== Roberts baronets, of Martholme (1931) ==
- Sir George Roberts, 1st Baronet (1859–1950)

Roberts, who used the pseudonym "Audax", was known as a philanthropist who donated to charitable causes. He gave £105,000 to The King's Fund in 1929.
