= C. F. Strickland =

British colonial administrator (1881–1962)

C. F. Strickland CIE
- Born: Claude Francis Strickland; 19 December 1881; Hampstead, Middlesex, England
- Died: 30 January 1962 (aged 80); Surrey, England
- Education: Winchester College; New College, Oxford
- Spouse: Dorothy Lisa Branson (m. 1915)
- Children: 2

Claude Francis Strickland CIE (19 December 1881 – 30 January 1962) was a British colonial administrator in the Indian Civil Service. Strickland was a leading theorist and advocate for the use of co-operatives across the British Empire.

Strickland was educated at Winchester College and New College, Oxford. He served as registrar of co-operatives in Punjab from 1915 to 1920, and again from 1922 to 1927. In 1931 he was appointed a Companion of the Order of the Indian Empire. From 1937 to 1941 he lectured at the University of Oxford. He authored a series of books on co-operatives.
