= Vincent P. Burke =

Canadian politician (1878–1953)

Vincent Patrick Burke CBE (August 3, 1878 – December 19, 1953) was a Newfoundland educator and administrator and a member of the Senate of Canada.

He was born in St. Jacques, Newfoundland, to a Roman Catholic family of Irish descent. He was educated at St. Bonaventure's College in St. John's. He worked as a teacher and, at 19, he was appointed principal of the high school in Torbay. He was appointed Superintendent of Roman Catholic Schools in 1899.

He pursued his studies at Columbia University and earned a doctorate.

While studying in the US, he became the first Newfoundlander to become a licensed school superintendent in New York.

Burke was a member of the Dominion of Newfoundland's Council of Higher Education which was established in 1893 by members of the various religious denominations that operated schools in the province (there was no public school system) to facilitate the pursuit of post-secondary education by Newfoundlanders. As there was no university in Newfoundland, the CHE negotiated agreements with universities in Canada the United Kingdom and the United States to enable them to admit students from Newfoundland and created and oversaw a Common Entrance Examination by which high school graduates could establish their credentials for university admission. As Newfoundland's educational system ended at Grade 11, students wishing to pursue post-secondary education had to make up the equivalent of an extra year of education in their preparations for the exam. The CHE also oversaw the selection of Newfoundland's Rhodes Scholars. However, as the island had no university, students selected as scholars lacked the two years of university that other Rhodes Scholars had, prompting complaints from the Rhodes Scholarship Committee. As a result, the CHE decided to establish a two-year college in St. John's.

Burke was instrumental in the establishment of Memorial University College. In 1919, Burke, as superintendent of Catholic education on the island and his Methodist counterpart on the CHE, Levi Curtis, co-sponsored a resolution of the Patriotic Association urging the Newfoundland government to build a training school as a memorial to those who died during World War I. As part of the CHE's effort to create the university, Burke arranged a grant of $300,000 from the Carnegie Corporation. He was convenor of Memorial's first Board of Governors in 1925 when the college was established and was chairman of the board from 1936 to 1951.

In 1920, the government of Sir Richard Squires created Newfoundland's Department of Education and Burke was appointed Newfoundland's Deputy Minister of Education and worked to improve teacher training. He continued in the post of Deputy Minister until 1927 when he was named Secretary of Education Burke was also chairman of the Newfoundland School Curriculum Commission from 1933 to 1934. He left the position of Secretary of Education in 1935 when he was appointed director of adult education in Newfoundland, a position he held until 1946.

Burke was named to the Order of the British Empire in 1917 for his work during World War I. He became an officer in the Order in 1931 and Commander in 1946. His work was also recognized by the Vatican when he was knighted by the Pope in 1940.

He was appointed to the Senate by Louis St. Laurent on January 25, 1950, and served as a Liberal senator until his death in late 1953 after having been ill for two years.
