= Hugh MacMahon (Indian Army officer) =

British Indian Army general (1880–1939)

Hugh Francis Edward MacMahon
- Born: 13 October 1880
- Died: 18 February 1939 (aged 58); London
- Military career
- Allegiance: United Kingdom
- Branch: British Indian Army
- Service years: 1900–1937
- Rank: Major-General
- Units: Indian Staff Corps, 27th Punjabis
- Conflicts: First World War
- Awards: CB CSI CBE MC

Major-General Hugh Francis Edward MacMahon, CB, CSI, CBE, MC (13 October 1880 – 18 February 1939) was a senior British Indian Army officer.

== Biography ==
Born in 1880, MacMahon was educated at Bedford School and at the Royal Military College, Sandhurst, and after graduation was placed on the unattached list as a second lieutenant on 20 January 1900. Posted to the Punjab Command three months later, he was formally transferred to the Indian Staff Corps in April 1901, and served with the 27th Punjabis in Waziristan between 1901 and 1902. He was promoted to lieutenant on 20 April 1902. During the First World War he served in France and Mesopotamia. He served in Kurdistan, in 1919, in Waziristan, between 1923 and 1924, and on the North West Frontier, between 1927 and 1928. He was appointed Aide-de-camp to King George V in 1929, promoted to the rank of major general in 1930, and was deputy adjutant and quartermaster general, Northern Command, between 1933 and 1937.

Major General Hugh MacMahon became a Commander of the Order of the British Empire in 1925, a Companion of the Order of the Bath in 1931, and a Companion of the Order of the Star of India in 1937. He retired from the British Indian Army in 1937 and died in London on 18 February 1939.
