= Ambrose Woodall, 1st Baron Uvedale of North End =

British surgeon (1885–1974)

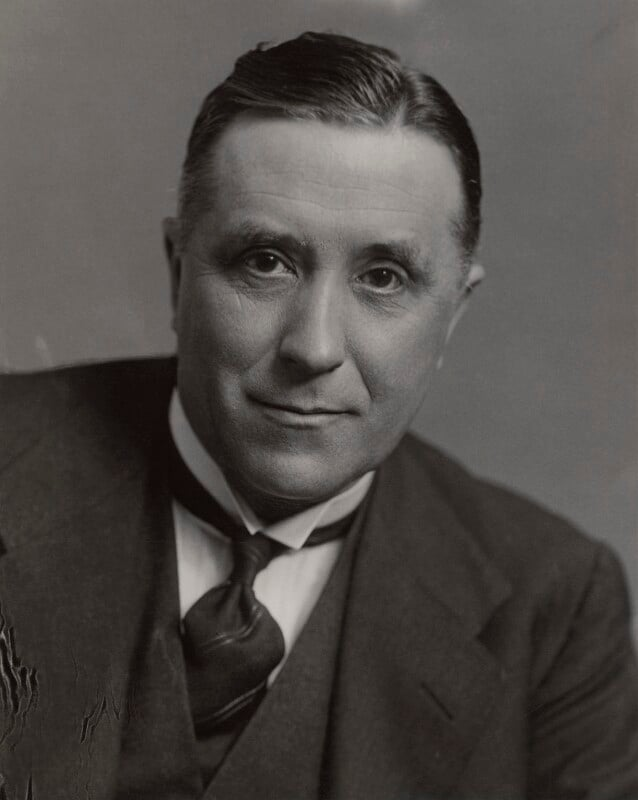
Woodall in the 1930s

Ambrose Edgar Woodall, 1st Baron Uvedale of North End MD FRCS (24 April 1885 – 28 February 1974), known as Sir Ambrose Woodall between 1931 and 1946, was a British surgeon.

Woodall was Resident Surgeon at Manor House Hospital from 1921 to 1958 and Medical Adviser to the National Union of Railway Men and other unions from 1922 to 1958. He was knighted in 1931 and elevated to the peerage as Baron Uvedale of North End, of North End in the County of Middlesex, in 1946.

Woodall was childless and his title became extinct upon his death on 28 February 1974, aged 88.

== Arms ==
Coat of arms of Ambrose Woodall, 1st Baron Uvedale of North End
Crest Upon a stump of a tree eradicated a pheasant Proper. Escutcheon Or a hurst of oak trees eradicated Proper in chief two crosses moline Gules. Supporters On either side in front of a fir tree a pheasant all Proper. Motto Labor Omnia Vincit

Peerage of the United Kingdom
New creation	Baron Uvedale of North End; 1946–1974	Extinct
