= George Roos-Keppel =

British military officer

George Olaf Roos-Keppel
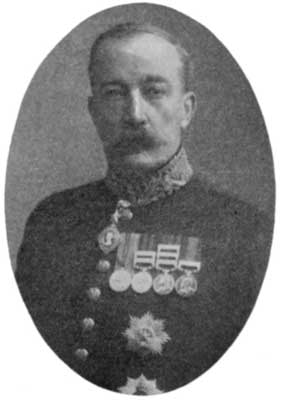
- Born: 7 September 1866; London, United Kingdom
- Died: 11 December 1921 (aged 55)
- Military career
- Allegiance: United Kingdom
- Branch: British Army
- Service years: 1886–1920
- Rank: Lieutenant Colonel
- Conflicts: Third Anglo-Afghan War
- Awards: Knight Grand Commander of the Order of the Indian Empire (1917); Knight Commander of the Order of the Star of India (1915)

Sir George Olaf Roos-Keppel, GCIE, KCSI (7 September 1866 – 11 December 1921) was a British military officer who served in the capacities of Political Agent to the Governor-General in Kurram and Khyber, and later as Chief Commissioner, North West Frontier Province from 1908 till 1919. He is also known for his role in 3rd Afghan War.

== Life ==
Roos was born in the Park Lane area of London, the son of Gustaf Ehrenreich Roos, a Swedish merchant in England, and his wife, Elizabeth Annie Roffey, daughter of George Roffey of Twickenham. He changed his surname in 1890, to Roos-Keppel, at the request of his Dutch-Swedish grandmother. He was educated at United Services College, Westward Ho!, abroad, and at the Royal Military College, Sandhurst.

George Roos was commissioned a lieutenant in the Royal Scots Fusiliers on 25 August 1886, and was promoted to captain on 1 September 1895. He transferred to the Indian Staff Corps on 19 September 1897. He was Political Officer in the Khyber when in March 1900 he was appointed to the temporary command of the Khyber Rifles, a frontier corps. For his service on the North West Frontier of India, he was appointed a Companion of the Order of the Indian Empire (CIE) in the 1900 New Year Honours list. Promoted to the brevet rank of major in 1902, he received the substantive rank of major in 1904 and promotion to Brevet lieutenant-colonel in 1907. In 1908, he was knighted with the KCIE and was promoted to full Lieutenant-Colonel in 1912.

In 1913, Roos-Keppel, along with Nawab Sir Sahibzada Abdul Qayyum established Islamia College (Peshawar), which was inaugurated by Haji Sahib Turangzai. Roos-Keppel was also president of Central Committee of Examiners in Pashto. He is credited with foreseeing the genius in the young Cambridge graduate Inayatullah Khan by appointing him, at the age of 24, the Vice Principal of Islamia College (Peshawar) in 1913, and then the Principal in 1917. He was appointed a KCSI in 1915 and a GCIE in 1917. He formally retired from the Indian Army in 1920 and died on 11 December of the following year, aged 55.

== Academic contributions ==
Roos-Keppel was well versed in the Pashto language:

- In 1901, he produced his own editions from T. B. Hughes' English translations of Ganj-e-Pashto and Tarikh-e-Sultan Mahmud-e-Ghaznavi. These editions replaced the older versions as textbooks for Military officers.
- He also authored 'The Pashto Manual' as a guide book on colloquial Pashto in 1901, followed by a second impression in 1907 while serving as Captain in the Khyber Pass.

== Notes ==
Government offices
Preceded by Harold Deane	Chief Commissioner of the North-West Frontier Province; 1908–1909	Succeeded by William Rudolph Henry Merck
Preceded by William Rudolph Henry Merck	2nd term 1910–1913	Succeeded by Sir John Stuart Donald
Preceded by Sir John Stuart Donald	3rd term 1915–1919	Succeeded by Sir Hamilton Grant
