= Steuart Pears =

British colonial administrator (1875–1931)

Sir Steuart Edmund Pears, KCIE, CSI (1875 – 9 September 1931) was a British administrator in India. A member of the Indian Civil Service, he spent most of his career in the Political Department of the Government of India.

He was British Resident in Mysore from 1925 to 1930 and Chief Commissioner of the North-West Frontier Province from 1930 until death the following year.

On 9 September 1931, Pears died after falling off a cliff in Nathia Gali, the summer headquarters of the government.
