= Rahimtoola =

Rahimtoola is an Indian (Khoja) surname. Notable people with the surname include:

- Fazal I. Rahimtoola (1895–1977), Indian politician
- Habib Rahimtoola (1912–1991), Pakistani politician
- Hoosenaly Rahimtoola (1890–1977), Mayor of Bombay, India
- Ibrahim Rahimtoola (1862–1942), Indian politician
- Jafar Rahimtoola Kaderbhoy (1870–1912), Indian barrister
- Razia Rahimtoola (1919–1988), Pakistani pediatrician
- Shahbudin Rahimtoola (1931–2018), Indian cardiologist
- Shamsuddin H. Rahimtoola (1936–2016), Pakistani physician
- Zubeida Rahimtoola (1917–2015), Pakistani politician
