= 1911 Delhi Durbar Honours =

British government recognitions

The 1911 Delhi Durbar was held in December 1911 following the coronation in London in June of that year of King George V and Queen Mary. The King and Queen travelled to Delhi for the Durbar. For the occasion, the statutory limits of the membership of the Order of the Star of India and the Order of the Indian Empire were increased and many appointments were made to these and other orders. These honours were published in a supplement to the London Gazette dated 8 December 1911.

In the lists below, names of recipients of honours are shown as they were styled before their new honours. Archaic transliterations of personal and place names are retained as shown in the London Gazette. Similarly, place names are given as shown in the Gazette, e.g. Madras (now Chennai), Bombay (now Mumbai), etc. The term "India" refers to British India as it was in 1911, comprising territories which are now the nations of Pakistan, India, Bangladesh, and Myanmar.

== Order of the Star of India ==
=== Knight Grand Commander (GCSI) ===
- His Excellency Sir George Sydenham Clarke, G.C.M.G., G.C.I.E., Governor of Bombay.
- The Hon. Sir Arthur Lawley, G.C.I.E., K.C.M.G., Ex-Governor of Madras.
- Sir John Prescott Hewett, K.C.S.I., C.I.E., Indian Civil Service, President of the Coronation Durbar Committee.
- Colonel His Highness Maharaja Raj Rajeshwar Siromani Sri Sir Ganga Singh Bahadur, G.C.I.E., K.C.S.I., A.D.C., Maharaja of Bikaner.
- Major General His Highness Priyadarsi Devanampriya Maharajdhiraj Maharaja Krishna Pratap Singh Bahadur, G.C.I.E., G.C.S.I., Maharaja of Singrauli
- Major His Highness Maharao Sir Umed Singh Bahadur, G.C.I.E., K.C.S.I., Maharao of Kotah.
- His Excellency General Sir Garrett O'Moore Creagh, V.C., G.C.B., Commander-in-Chief of His Majesty's Forces in India, and an Extraordinary Member of the Council of the Governor-General of India.
- His Highness Farzand-i-Dilband Raish-ul-Itikad Daulat-i-Inglisbia Raja-i-Rajagan Raja Sir Jagatjit Singh Bahadur Ahluwalia, of Kapurthala.
- His Highness Asafjah Muzaffer-ul-Mulk-Maamalik Nizam-ul-Mulk Nizam-ud-Daula Nawab Mir Usman Ali Khan Bahadur Fateh Jang, the 7th Nizam of Hyderabad.
- His Highness Aga Sir Sultan Muhammad Shah Aga Khan, G.C.I.E., of Bombay.

=== Knight Commander (KCSI) ===
- Leslie Alexander Selim Porter, Esq., C.S.I., Indian Civil Service, Acting Lieutenant-Governor of the United Provinces of Agra and Oudh.
- John Lewis Jenkins, Esq., C.S.I., Indian Civil Service, an Ordinary Member of the Council of the Governor-General of India.
- Spencer Harcourt Butler, Esq., C.S.I., C.I.E., Indian Civil Service, an Ordinary Member of the Council of the Governor-General of India.
- Robert Warrand Carlyle, Esq., C.S.I., C.I.E., Indian Civil Service, an Ordinary Member of the Council of the Governor-General of India.
- Captain His Highness Umdae Rajahae Baland Makan Maharajadhiraja Sir Madan Singh Bahadur, K.C.I.E., Maharaja of Kishangarh.
- Reginald Henry Craddock, Esq., C.S.I., Indian Civil Service, Chief Commissioner, Central Provinces.
- James McCrone Douie, Esq., C.S.I., Indian Civil Service, First Financial Commissioner of the Punjab, and an Additional Member of the Council of the Lieutenant-Governor of the Punjab for making Laws and Regulations.
- James Scorgie Meston, Esq., C.S.I., Indian Civil Service, Secretary to the Government of India in the Finance Department, and an Additional Member of the Council of the Governor-General of India for making Laws and Regulations.
- Benjamin Robertson, Esq., C.S.I., C.I.E., Indian Civil Service, Secretary to the Government of India, Commerce and Industry Department, and an Additional Member of the Council of the Governor-General of India for making Laws and Regulations.
- Richard Amphlett Lamb, Esq., C.S.I., C.I.E., Indian Civil Service, an Ordinary Member and Vice-President of the Council of the Governor of Bombay.
- Maharajadhiraja Sir Bijay Chand Mahtab Bahadur, K.C.I.E., of Burdwan, a Member of the Council of the Lieutenant-Governor of Bengal for making Laws and Regulations.
- Elliot Graham Colvin, Esq., C.S.I., Indian Civil Service, Agent to the Governor-General of India in Rajputana, and Chief Commissioner, Ajmer-Merwara.
- Sir Trevredyn Rashleigh Wynne, K.C.I.E., V.D., Chairman of the Railway Board and an Additional Member of the Council of the Governor-General of India for making Laws and Regulations.
- Surgeon-General Charles Pardey Lukis, C.S.I., M.D., Indian Medical Service, Director-General, Indian Medical Service, and an Additional Member of the Council of the Governor-General of India for making Laws and Regulations.
- Stanley Ismay, Esq., C.S.I., Indian Civil Service (retired), Chief Justice of the Chief Court of Mysore.
- George Casson Walker, Esq., C.S.I., Indian Civil Service (retired), lately Financial Adviser to the Government of the Nizam of Hyderabad.
- Apcar Alexander Apcar, Esq., C.S.I., Consul for Siam in Calcutta.
- His Highness Raja Udaji Rao Puar, Raja of Dhar, in Central India.
- His Highness Raja Tukoji Rao Puar of Dewas State (Senior Branch), in Central India.
- Surgeon-General Francis Wollaston Trevor, C.B., M.B., K.H.S., Principal Medical Officer, India.
- His Highness Maharaja 5 Sris Sir Ugyen Wangchuk, K.C.I.E., of Bhutan.

Memorandum
It was the King's gracious intention to have promoted Sardar Partab Singh, C.S.I., to be a Knight Commander of the Most Exalted Order of the Star of India, had the Sardar survived.

=== Companion (CSI) ===
- Robert Woodburn Gillan, Esq., Barrister-at-Law, Indian Civil Service, Comptroller and Auditor-General of the Financial Department of the Government of India.
- John Walter Hose, Esq., Indian Civil Service, Chief Secretary to the Government of the United Provinces of Agra and Oudh, and an Additional Member of the Council of the Lieutenant-Governor.
- Charles Earnest Year Goument Esq., Indian Public Works Department, Chief Engineer and Secretary to the Government of the United Provinces of Agra and Oudh, Buildings, Roads and Railway Branches, and an Additional Member of the Council of the Lieutenant-Governor for making Laws and Regulations.
- Harrington Verney Lovett, Esq., Indian Civil Service, Commissioner, Benares Division, United Provinces.
- Herbert Lovely Eales, Esq., Indian Civil Service, Officiating Judicial Commissioner of Upper Burma.
- George Gilbert White, Esq., Chief Engineer and Secretary, Public Works Department, Government of Burma, and an Additional Member of the Council of the Lieutenant-Governor for making Laws and Regulations.
- Colonel Sidney Gerald Burrard, R.E., F.R.S., Officiating Surveyor-General of India.
- Frederick Beadon Bryant, Esq., Inspector-General of Forests to the Government of India.
- Lieutenant-Colonel Herbert Lionel Showers, C.I.E., Indian Army, Resident at Jaipur.
- Frank George Sly, Esq., Indian Civil Service, Commissioner of Berar, Central Provinces.
- George Moss Harriott, Esq., C.I.E., Chief Engineer and Secretary, Public Works Department, Central Provinces.
- Ernest Herbert Cooper Walsh, Esq., Indian Civil Service, Commissioner, Bhagalpur Division, Bengal.
- Edward Vere Levinge, Esq., Indian Civil Service, Commissioner, Orissa Division, Bengal.
- Robert Nathan, Esq., C.I.E., Indian Civil Service, Commissioner of a Division, Eastern Bengal and Assam, and an Additional Member of the Council of the Lieutenant-Governor for making Laws and Regulations.
- Arthur Meredith, Esq., Indian Civil Service, Officiating Second Financial Commissioner of the Punjab, and an Additional Member of the Council of the Lieutenant-Governor of the Punjab for making Laws and Regulations.
- Lieutenant-Colonel Charles Archer, C.I.E., Indian Army, Political Agent, 1st class.
- James Peter Orr, Esq., Indian Civil Service, Senior Collector and Chairman of the City of Bombay Improvement Trust, and an Additional Member of the Council of the Governor of Bombay for making Laws and Regulations.
- Herbert Alexander Casson, Esq., Indian Civil Service, Deputy Commissioner in the Punjab.
- William Axel Hertz, Esq., F.R.G.S., Deputy Commissioner of Myitkyina, Burma.
- Mahadev Bhaskar Chaubal, Esq., an Ordinary Member of the Council of the Governor of Bombay.
- George Seymour Curtis, Esq., Indian Civil Service, Commissioner, Central Division, Bombay Presidency, and an Additional Member of the Council of the Governor of Bombay for making Laws and Regulations.
- Syed Ali Imam, Esq., Barrister-at-Law, an Ordinary Member of the Council of the Governor-General of India.
- William Henry Clark, Esq., C.M.G., an Ordinary Member of the Council of the Governor-General of India.
- Major (temporary Lieutenant-Colonel) Francis Aylmer Maxwell, V.C., D.S.O., Military Secretary to the Governor-General of India.
- Major Clive Wigram, M.V.O., Assistant Private Secretary and Equerry to His Majesty the King-Emperor.
- Herbert Thomson, Esq., Indian Civil Service, Officiating Chief Secretary to the Government of Burma, and an Additional Member of the Council of the Lieutenant-Governor of Burma for making Laws and Regulations.
- Rao Bahadur Nauak Chand, C.J.E., Minister, Indore State.
- Lieutenant-Colonel William Burney Bannerman, M.D., Indian Medical Service, Surgeon-General with the Government of Madras, and lately Director, Bombay Bacteriological Laboratory.
- Lieutenant-Colonel John Ramsay, C.I.E., Indian Army, Agent to the Governor-General of India and Chief Commissioner, Baluchistan.
- Stuart Lockwood Maddox, Esq., Indian Civil Service, Chairman of the Calcutta Corporation, and an Additional Member of the Council of the Lieutenant-Governor of Bengal for making Laws and -Regulations.
- Gilbert Thomas Walker, Esq., D.Sc., F.R.S., Director-General of Indian Observatories.
- Venkatarama Krishnaswami Aiyar, Esq., an Ordinary Member of the Council of the Governor of Fort St George.
- Lieutenant-Colonel Phillip Richard Thornhagh Gurdon, Indian Army, Commissioner, Assam Valley District, and an Additional Member of the Council of the Lieutenant-Governor of Eastern Bengal and Assam for making Laws and Regulations.
- Khan Zulfikar Ali Khan of Maler Kotla, Punjab, an Additional Member of the Council of the Governor-General of India for making Laws and Regulations.
- Colonel George Francis Angelo Harris, M.D., V.H.S., Indian Medical Service, Inspector-General of Civil Hospitals, Bengal.
- Edmund Vivian Gabriel, Esq., C.V.O., Indian Political Department, Secretary, Coronation Durbar Committee.
- John Stuart Donald, Esq., C.I.E., Indian Political Department, Resident in Waziristan.
- Henry Montague Segundo Mathews, Esq., Commissioner of Settlements and Land Records, Burma.
- Arthur Crommelin Hankin, Esq., C.I.E., Indian Police Department, Inspector-General of His Highness the Nizam of Hyderabad's District Police.
- Faridoonji Jamshedji, Esq., C.I.E., Political Secretary to His Highness the Nizam of Hyderabad, and Private Secretary to the Minister, Hyderabad State.
- Maulvi Ahmad Hussain, Private Secretary to His Highness the Nizam of Hyderabad, and Chief Secretary to the Nizam's Government.
- Horace Charles Mules, Esq., M.V.O., Collector of Karachi, Chairman, Karachi Port Trust, and President, Karachi Municipality.
- His Highness Raja Bije Chand, Chief of Kahlur (Bilaspur), Punjab.
- Lieutenant-Colonel Arthur Russell Aldridge, Royal Army Medical Corps, lately Sanitary Officer, Army Headquarters.
- Major (temporary Lieutenant-Colonel) Mathew Richard Henry Wilson, 10th Hussars, Military Secretary to the Commander-in-Chief in India.
- John Charles Burnham, Esq., Manager and Chemist of the Cordite Factory, Aruvankadu, Nilgiri Hills.
- Brevet-Colonel Thomas Francis Bruce Renny-Tailyour, R.E., Superintendent of Surveys, Southern Circle.
- Michael Kennedy, Esq., Indian Police Department, Inspector-General of Police, Bombay.
- Thakor Karansinhji Vajirajji, Chief of Lakhtar, Kathiawar Agency, Bombay Presidency.
- Meherban Mudhojirao Janrao Naik Nana Nimbalkar, Chief, of Phaltan, Satara Agency, Bombay Presidency.
- Major Alain Chartier de Lotbinière Joly de Lotbinière, C.I.E., R.E., Public Works Department, State Engineer, Kashmir.
- Brigadier-General Herbert Vaughan Cox, Indian Army, Military Member, Coronation Durbar Committee.
- Brevet-Colonel Robert Smeiton Maclagan, C.B., R.E., Superintending Engineer, Punjab, and a Member of the Coronation Durbar Committee.
- Lieutenant-Colonel Charles Mowbray Dallas, Indian Army, Commissioner of Delhi Division, Punjab, and a Member of the Coronation Durbar Committee.
- Edward Henry Scamander Clarke, Esq., C.I.E., Deputy Secretary to the Government of India, Foreign Department.
- Jagadish Chundra Bose, Esq., C.I.E., Professor of the Presidency College, Calcutta.

Memorandum
It was the King's gracious intention to have appointed the Nawab Alladad Khan, Saddozai, of Dera Ismail Khan, to be a Companion of the Most Exalted Order of the Star of India had the Nawab survived.

== Order of the Indian Empire ==
=== Knight Grand Commander (GCIE) ===
- Major-General His Highness Maharaja Sir Pratap Singh, Indar Mahindar Bahadur, Sipar-i-Saltanat, G.C.S.I., Maharaja of Kashmir.
- Sir Louis William Dane, K.C.I.E., C.S.I., Indian Civil Service, Lieutenant-Governor of the Punjab.
- His Highness Sir Shahu Chhatrapati Maharaj, G.C.S.I., G.C.V.O., Maharaja of Kolhapur, Bombay Presidency.
- Maharaja Sri Rao Sir Venkatasvetachalapati Ranga Rao Bahadur, K.C.I.E., Zamindar of Bobbili, in the Madras Presidency.
- Lieutenant-Colonel the Right Honourable Arthur John, Baron Stamfordham, G.C.V.O., K.C.B., K.C.M.G., K.C.S.I., I.S.O., Private Secretary to His Majesty the King-Emperor.
- Sir Guy Douglas Arthur Fleetwood Wilson, K.C.B., K.C.M.G., an Ordinary Member of the Council of the Governor-General of India.
- Sir John Newell Jordan, K.C.B., K.C.M.G., Envoy Extraordinary and Minister Plenipotentiary at Peking.
- His Highness Maharajadhiraja Maharana Sir Fateh Singh Bahadur, G.C.S.I., of Udaipur.
- His Highness Maharaja Bhupindra Singh Mahindra Bahadur, Chief of Patiala State, Punjab.
- His Highness Mir Imam Baksh Khan, Ruler of Khairpur State, Bombay Presidency.
- Major General His Highness Priyadarsi Devanampriya Maharajdhiraj Maharaja Krishna Pratap Singh Bahadur, G.C.S.I., G.C.I.E., Maharaja of Singrauli
- His Highness Raja Sir Rama Varma, G.C.S.I., of Cochin, Madras Presidency.
- Nawab Bahadur Sir Khwaja Salimulla, K.C.S.I., of Dacca, Eastern Bengal and Assam.

Honorary Knight Commander

- General Albert Houtum Schindler, C.I.E., lately Director, Central Department, Persian Foreign Office.
- Sheikh Mubarak Bin Subah, Ruler of Koweit.

=== Knight Commander (KCIE) ===
- Frederick William Duke, Esq., C.S.I., Indian Civil Service, Member of the Lieutenant-Governor's Executive Council, Bengal, and Acting Lieutenant-Governor of Bengal.
- Archdale Earle, Esq., C.I.E., Indian Civil Service, Secretary to the Government of India, Home Department, and an Additional Member of the Council of the Governor-General of India for making Laws and Regulations.
- Charles Stewart-Wilson, Esq., Barrister-at-Law; Indian Civil Service, Director-General of the Post Office of India, and an Additional Member of the Council of the Governor-General of India for making Laws and Regulations.
- Major-General Malcolm Henry Stanley Grover, C.B., Indian Army, Secretary to the Government of India, Army Department, and an Additional Member of the Council of the Governor-General of India for making Laws and Regulations.
- Charles Raitt Cleveland, Esq., C.I.E., Indian Civil Service, Director, Criminal Investigation Department.
- Lieutenant-General Sir Douglas Haig, K.C.V.O., C.B., Chief of the General Staff, Indian Army.
- Sri Kantirava Narasinharaja Wadiyar Bahadur, Yuvaraja of Mysore.
- Lieutenant-Colonel Hugh Daly, C.S.I., C.I.E., Indian Army, Resident in Mysore, and Chief Commissioner, Coorg.
- Henry Parsall Burt, Esq., C.I.E., Manager, North-Western Railway, and an Additional Member of the Council of the Lieutenant-Governor of the Punjab for making Laws and Regulations.
- James Houssemayne DuBoulay, Esq., C.I.E., Indian Civil Service, Private Secretary to the Viceroy and Governor-General of India.
- His Highness Maharajadhiraja Sipahdar-ul-Mulk Jujharsingh Ju Deo Bahadur, C.I.E., of Charkhari State, Bundelkhand, Central India.
- Rajendra Nath Mukharji, Esq., C.I.E., Sheriff of Calcutta.
- Lieutenant-Colonel Henry Beaufoy Thornhill, C.I.E., Indian Army, Inspecting Officer of Cantonments.
- Gangadhar Madho Chitnavis, Esq., C.I.E., of Nagpur, an Additional Member of the Council of the Governor-General of India for making Laws and Regulations.
- Captain His Highness Fakur-ud-Daula Nawab Muhammad Iftikar Ali Khan Bahadur Saulat Jung, of Jaora State, Central India.
- His Highness Raja Ram Singh, of Sitamau State, Central India.
- Raj Sahib Amarsinhji Banesinhji, of Vankaner, Bombay Presidency.
- Ram Krishna Gopal Bhandarkar, Esq., C.I.E., LL.D., of Poona, Bombay Presidency.
- Michael Filose, Esq., C.I.E., Chief Secretary to His Highness the Maharaja Scindia of Gwalior.
- Rear-Admiral Sir Colin Richard Keppel, K.C.V.O., C.B., D.S.O., Extra Equerry to His Majesty the King-Emperor.
- Surgeon-General Arthur Mudge Branfoot, C.I.E., Indian Medical Service (retired), President of the Medical Board, India Office.
- Sir John Stanley, K.C., lately Chief Justice of the High Court of Judicature, North-Western Provinces.
- Saint-Hill Eardley-Wilmot, Esq., C.I.E., Commissioner under the Development Act for Great Britain, lately Inspector-General of Forests to the Government of India.
- Lieutenant-Colonel Percy Zachariah Cox, C.S.I., C.I.E., Indian Army, Political Resident in the Persian Gulf.
- Munusami Pillai of Nungambakkam, Zamindar, Madras Presidency.
- Francis Edward Spring, Esq., C.I.E., Public Works Department (retired), Chairman of the Madras Port Trust Board, and an Additional. Member of the Council of the Governor of Fort St George for making Laws and Regulations.
- William Arthur Dring, Esq., C.I.E., Agent, East Indian Railway Company.
- Maharaja Sri Vickrama Deo, of Jeypore, Zamindar in the Madras Presidency.
- His Highness Maharaja Thotab Namgyal, of Sikkim.
- Rana Sheoraj Singh, Taluqdar of Thalrai (Khajurgaon), in the Rai Bareli District of Oudh.
- Raja Shaban Ali Khan, Khan Bahadur, of Salempur, Lucknow District, Oudh.
- His Highness Maharaja Sir Sawai Jey Singh Bahadur, K.C.S.I., of Alwar.
- His Highness Maharawal Raghunath Singh Bahadur, of Partabgarh, Rajputana.
- His Highness Maharaha Shri Chatrasinhji Gambhirsinhji, Raja of Rajpipla, Rewakantha Agency, Bombay Presidency.
- Diwan Bahadur Seth Kasturchand Daga, Central Provinces.
- His Highness Maharaja Sawai Sawant Singh Bahadur, of Bijawar State, Bundelkhand, Central India.
- General Mowbray Thomson (retired), late Bengal Infantry.

=== Companion (CIE) ===
- The Hon'ble Babu Mahendranath Ray, Esq., HonFRS, lawyer, educationist, First elected chairperson of Howrah
- James Herbert Seabrooke, Esq., Assistant Secretary, Military Department, India Office.
- Walter Culley Madge, Esq., President of the Anglo-Indian Association, and an Additional Member of the Council of the Governor-General of India for making Laws and Regulations.
- Lieutenant-Colonel Wallace Christopher Ramsay Stratton, Indian Army, Commissioner of Ajmer-Merwara.
- James Scott, Esq., Assistant Private Secretary to the Viceroy and Governor-General of India.
- Nawab Sardar Jallab Khan Gurchani. Tribal Chief, Gurchani Tribe Lalgarh State.
- Major Edward Charles Bayley, Indian Army, Private Secretary to the Lieutenant-Governor of the Punjab.
- Rai Bahadur Lala Sheo Prasad, an Honorary Magistrate of Delhi, Punjab.
- Frederick William Johnston, Esq., Indian Civil Service, Secretary to the Chief Commissioner, North-West Frontier Province.
- Major Arthur Louis Bickford, Indian Army, 56th Punjabi Rifles (Frontier Force), Commandant, Khyber Rifles.
- Edward Gelson Gregson, Esq., Indian Police, Superintendent of Police, North-West Frontier Province, on special duty in connection with suppression of the arms traffic.
- William Malcolm Hailey, Esq., Indian Civil Service, Deputy Secretary to the Government of India, Financial Department, on special duty with the Coronation Durbar Committee.
- Colonel Benjamin William Marlow, Indian Army, Military Accountant-General, and ex officio Deputy Secretary to the Government of India, Financial Department (Military Finance).
- Herbert Gerard Tomkins, Esq., Financial Department, Government of India, Officiating Accountant-General, Bengal.
- Henry Whitby Smith, Esq., Indo-European Telegraph Department, lately Director, Persian Gulf Section.
- Major Francis Beville Prideaux, Indian Army, Political Agent, Southern Rajputana States.
- Major Arthur Prescott Trevor, Indian Army, Political Agent.
- Lieutenant-Colonel Ramsay Frederick Clayton Gordon, Indian Army, lately Private Secretary to the Lieutenant-Governor, United Provinces of Agra and Oudh, at present Private Secretary to President, Coronation Durbar Committee.
- Lieutenant-Colonel Charles MacTaggart, Indian Medical Service, Inspector-General of Prisons, United Provinces of Agra and Oudh.
- Nawab Mirza Mahdi Husain, Khan Bahadur, of Lucknow.
- Rai Kishan Sah Bahadur, Honorary Magistrate, Naini Tal, United Provinces of Agra and Oudh.
- Hopetoun Gabriel Stokes, Esq., Indian Civil Service, Deputy Secretary to the Government of India, Financial Department.
- Major Leonard Rogers, M.D., Indian Medical Service, Professor of Pathology, Medical College, Calcutta, and Bacteriologist to the Government of India.
- Nawab Abdul Majid, Barrister-at-Law, Lawyer, Allahabad High Court, a Fellow of the Allahabad University, and an Additional Member of the Council of the Governor-General of India for making Laws and Regulations.
- Ludovic Charles Porter, Esq., Indian Civil Service, Secretary to the Government of India, Education Department, and an Additional Member of the Council of the Governor-General of India for making Laws and Regulations.
- Henry Sharp, Esq., Joint Secretary to the Government of India, Education Department, and an Additional Member of the Council of the Governor-General of India for making Laws and Regulations.
- Arthur Venis, Esq., Principal of the Queen's College and the Sanskrit College, Benares.
- Mahamahopadya Hara Prasad Shastri, Honorary Magistrate, Naihati Independent Bench, Bengal.
- Lieutenant-Colonel Allen McConaghey, Indian Army, Political Agent and Deputy Commissioner, Quetta-Peshin, Baluchistan.
- Nawab Kaisar Khan, Chief of the Magassi Tribe, Baluchistan.
- Rai Bahadur Diwan Jamiat Rai, Extra Assistant Commissioner and Personal Native Assistant to the Agent to the Governor-General of India in Baluchistan.
- Robert Charles Francys Volkers, Esq., Secretary, Railway Board, Public Works Department, India.
- Henry Hubert Hayden, Esq., Director, Geological Survey of India.
- Alexander Muirhead, Esq., Agent, South Indian Railway Company.
- The Maharaj Kumar Sidkeong Tulku, Heir Apparent of Sikkim.
- Lieutenant-Colonel Edulji Palanji Frenchman, Indian Medical Service (retired).
- Alexander Emanuel English, Esq., Indian Civil Service, Registrar of Co-operative Credit Societies, Burma.
- George Frederick Arnold, Esq., Indian Civil Service, Revenue Secretary to the Government of Burma.
- Maung Myat Tun Aung, Burma Commission, Deputy Commissioner, Kyaukpyu, Burma.
- George Cunningham Buchanan, Esq., Chairman and Chief Engineer of the Port Trust, Rangoon.
- William Rucker Stikeman, Esq., Chairman of the Burma Chamber of Commerce, Vice-Chairman of the Rangoon Port Trust, and an Additional Member of the Council of the Lieutenant-Governor of Burma for making Laws and Regulations.
- Edward Robert Kaye Blenkinsop, Esq., Indian Civil Service, Commissioner of Settlemeiits and Director of Land Records, Central Provinces.
- George Sanky Hart, Esq., Chief Conservator of Forests1, Central Provinces.
- Nawab Muhammad Salamullah Khan Bahadur, Jagirdar of Deulghat, Buldhana district, Central Provinces and Berar.
- John Henry Kerr, Esq., Indian Civil Service, Magistrate and Collector, Bengal.
- Lieutenant-Colonel George Henry Evans, Officiating Inspector-General, Civil Veterinary Department.
- Major Henry Burden, Indian Medical Service, Residency Surgeon in Nepal.
- Maharaj Raghunath Singh, of Dhasuk in Kishangarh State.
- George William Kuchler, Esq., Director of Public Instruction, Bengal, and an Additional Member of the Council of the Lieutenant-General of Bengal for making Laws and Regulations.
- John Ghest Cumming, Esq., Indian Civil Service, Secretary to the Government of Bengal, Revenue and General Departments, and an Additional Member of the Council of the Lieutenant-Governor of Bengal for making Laws and Regulations.
- The Reverend John Anderson Graham, D.D., of Kalimpong, Darjeeling District.
- Francis Hugh Stewart, Esq., a Commissioner for the Port of Calcutta, and an Additional Member of the Council of the Lieutenant-Governor of Bengal for making Laws and Regulations.
- Khan Bahadur Maulavi Saiyid Muhammad Nasaruddin, Bengal Provincial Executive Service (retired), Revenue Member, Bhopal State.
- Louis James Kershaw, Esq., Indian Civil Service, Magistrate and Collector, Eastern Bengal and Assam.
- William Taylor Cathcart, Esq., an Additional Member of the Council of the Lieutenant Governor of Eastern Bengal and Assam for making Laws and Regulations.
- Maneckjee Byramjee Dadabhoy, Esq., Barrister-at-Law, Central Provinces, an Additional Member of the Council of the Governor-General of India for making Laws and Regulations.
- Hugh Murray, Esq., Imperial Forest Service (retired), lately Senior Conservator of Forests, Bombay.
- Sawai Rao Raja Raghunath Rao Dinkar Mushir-i-Khas Bahadur Madar-ul-Moham, Political Secretary to His Highness the Maharaja Scindia of Gwalior.
- Pundit Kailas Narayan Haksar, Lieutenant-Colonel in the Gwalior Army, and Private Secretary to His Highness the Maharaja Scindia of Gwalior.
- Captain Rudolph Shakespeare Edward Trower Hogg, 38th King George's Own Central India Horse, Assistant Military Secretary to His Majesty the King-Emperor.
- Major Ernest Douglas Money, 1st King George's Own Gurkha Rifles, Assistant Military Secretary to His Majesty the King-Emperor.
- Major Hugh Roderick Stockley, R.E., 1st King George's Own Sappers and Miners, Assistant Military Secretary to His Majesty the King-Emperor.
- Mokshagundam Visvesvaraya, Esq., Public Works Department, India (retired), Chief Engineer to the Government of Mysore.
- Lieutenant-Colonel Richard Godfrey Jones, Indian Army, Military Secretary to His Highness the Maharaja of Mysore.
- Jaghirdar Desraj Urs, M.V.O., Chief Commandant, Mysore State Troops.
- Major Armine Brereton Dew, Indian Army, lately Political Agent in Gilgit.
- Rai Sahib Diwan Amar Nath, Chief Minister to His Highness the Maharaja of Jammu and Kashmir.
- Lieutenant-Colonel James Reed Roberts, Indian Medical Service, Residency Surgeon in Indore and Administrative Medical Officer in Central India.
- Lieutenant-Colonel Lawrence Impey, Indian Army, Political Agent in Bundelkhand, Central India.
- Raja Avadhendra Bahadur Singh, of Kothi State, Baghelkhand Agency, Central India.
- Rao Bahadur Krishna Rao Wasudeo Mulye, Member of Council of Regency, Indore State, Central India.
- Colonel Alexander William Macrae, V.D., Honorary Colonel of the Malabar Volunteer Rifles, and an Honorary Aide-de-Camp to the Governor of Madras.
- Arthur Ernest Lawson, Esq., Sheriff of Madras.
- Albion Rajkumar Banerji, Esq., Indian Civil Service, Dewan of Cochin.
- Major Frederick Fenn Elwes, M.D., Indian Medical Service, Surgeon to the Governor of Madras.
- Colonel William Burgess Wright, V.D., General Traffic Manager, Madras and Southern Mahratta Railway, and Commanding 1st Battalion, Madras and Southern Mahratta Railway Rifles.
- Cecil Archibald Smith, Esq., Chief Engineer and Secretary to the Government of Madras, Public Works Department, and an Additional Member of the Council of the Governor of Fort St George for making Laws and Regulations.
- Sardar Shamsher Singh, Sardar Bahadur, Ahlkhar-i-Ala (Senior Member, Executive and Judicial-Committee) of the Jind State, Punjab.
- Baba Gurbaksh Singh Bedi, Honorary Extra-Assistant Commissioner, Kallar, Rawalpindi District, Punjab.
- Colonel Gilbert Walter Palin, Indian Army, Supply and Transport Corps, Deputy Director, Supply and Transport Corps, Coronation Durbar and Manœuvres.
- Lieutenant-Colonel Robert Edward Pemberton Pigott, V.D., Commandant, 1st Battalion, Bombay, Baroda, and Central India Railway Volunteer Rifles.
- Major William Daniel Henry, V.D., Simla Volunteer Rifles.
- Gerald Francis Keatinge, Esq., Indian Civil Service, Director of Agriculture and Cooperative Credit Societies, Bombay.
- Major John Glennie Greig, Indian Army, Military Secretary to the Governor of Bombay.
- Sardar Naoroji Pudamoji, ex-President of the Poona Municipality, Bombay Presidency.
- Vala Laksman Meram, Chief of Thana-Devli, Jetpur Taluka, Bombay Presidency.
- Claude Alexander Barren, Esq., Indian Civil Service, Deputy Commissioner, Delhi.
- Leonard William Reynolds, Esq., Indian Civil Service, Deputy Secretary to the Government of India, Foreign Department.
- Major Percy Molesworth Sykes, C.M.G., Indian Army, Political Agent, 4th Class, Consul-General and Agent to the Government of India in Khorasan.
- Charles Archibald Walker Rose, Esq., Consul at Tengyueh.
- Major Arthur Dennys Gilbert Ramsay, Indian Army, Political Agent, 1st Class.
- Captain John Mackenzie, Indian Army, Comptroller of the Household of the Viceroy and Governor-General of India.

== Imperial Order of the Crown of India ==
- Margaret Etienne Hannah, Marchioness of Crewe.
- Her Highness Nawab Sultan Jahan Begum, G.C.S.I., G.C.I.E., Begum of Bhopal.
- Her Highness Maharani Shri Nundkanvarba, wife of His Highness the Maharaja of Bhavnagar.

== Royal Victorian Order ==
=== Knight Grand Cross of the Royal Victorian Order (GCVO) ===
- Commanding General His Excellency Svasti Sri Madati Prachandra Bhujadandyetyadi Ati-Projjwala-Nepal-Taradisha Sri Teen Maharaja Chandra Shamsher Jang Bahadur Rana, Maharaja of Lamjung and Kaski, GCB, GCSI, FRGS, Prime Minister of Nepal.
- Hon. Colonel His Highness Nawab Sir Muhammed Hamid Ali Khan Bahadur, G.C.I.E., A.D.C., of Rampur.
- Lieut.-Colonel Sir Arthur Henry McMahon, K.C.I.E., C.S.I., Secretary to the Government of India, Foreign Department, Master of Ceremonies, King-Emperor's Coronation Durbar at Delhi, and an Additional Member of the Council of the Governor-General for making Laws and Regulations.
- Hon. Major-General His Highness Maharaja Bahadur Sir Pratap Singh, G.C.S.I., K.C.B., A.D.C., Regent of Jodhpur.

=== Knight Commander of the Royal Victorian Order (KCVO) ===
- Field Marshal Maharaja Bhim Shumsher Jang Bahadur Rana, Mukhtiyar and C-in-C of Nepal
- Edward Lee French, Esq., Indian Police, Inspector-General of Police, Punjab, and an Additional Member of the Council of the Lieutenant-Governor, Punjab, for making Laws and Regulations.
- Brigadier-General Rollo Estouteville Grimston, C.I.E., Indian Army, Military Secretary to His Majesty the King-Emperor.
- Hon. Colonel Nawab Sir Muhammad Aslam Khan, K.C.I.E., A.D.C.
- Rear-Admiral Sir Edmond John Warre Slade, K.C.I.E., M.V.O.
- Nawab Mumtaz-Ud-Daula Sir Muhammad Faiyaz Ali Khan, K.C.I.E., C.S.I., of Pahasu, Chief Member of Council, Jaipur State.

=== Commander of the Royal Victorian Order (CVO) ===
- Brigadier-General William Eliot Peyton, D.S.O., Commanding Meerut Cavalry Brigade, the King-Emperor's Herald.
- Colonel Sir Swinton Jacob, K.C.I.E., Indian Army, retired.
- Lieut.-Colonel Arthur D'Arcy Gordon Bannerman, C.I.E., Indian Army, on special duty in the Government of India, Foreign Department.
- Lieut.-Colonel John Manners Smith, V.C., C.I.E., Indian Army, Resident in Nepal.
- John Cromie Lyle, Esq., Chief Engineer of Durbar Railways.
- Montague Sherard Dawes Butler, Esq., C.I.E., Indian Civil Service, Deputy Secretary to the Government of India, Home Department, and Secretary of the Punjab to the All-India Memorial.
- Charles Augustus Kincaid, Esq., Indian Civil Service, Secretary to the Government of Bombay, Political Special and Judicial Departments.
- Major Frank Graham Smallwood, M.V.O., Royal Artillery-Ordnance Officer, on Deputation with Coronation Durbar Camp, Delhi.
- Balwant Rao Bhaiya Scindia, Member of the Board of Revenue Gwalior State.
- Colonel Charles James Bamber, Indian Medical Service, Inspector-General of Civil Hospitals, Punjab, and a Member of the Coronation Durbar Committee.
- Munshi Aziz-ud-din, C.I.E., M.V.O.
- Captain Walter Lumsden, R.N. (retired), Director, Royal Indian Marine.

=== Member of Royal Victorian Order, First Class (MVO) ===
- General Sardar Ahmed Sher Khan Bahadur Nasrat Jang Army General for Best Service, Bhopal

=== Member of the Royal Victorian Order, fourth class (MVO) ===
- Thomas Robert John Ward, Esq., C.I.E., A.M.I.C.E., Public Works Department, Superintending Engineer, Western Jumna Canal Circle, Punjab.
- Major Sidney D'Aguilar Crookshank, Royal Engineers, Executive Engineer, Public Works Department, United Provinces of Agra and Oudh, Superintendent of Works, Delhi Coronation Durbar.
- James Scott Pitkeathly, Esq., Electrical Inspector to the Government of the United Provinces of Agra and Oudh, and Electrical Engineer, Delhi Coronation Durbar.
- Major William Bernard James, 2nd Lancers, Assistant Adjutant-General on special duty, Coronation Durbar, Delhi.
- Lieut.-Colonel Thomas Cameron Fitzgerald Somerville, Commandant Royal Military School of Music.
- Major Arthur John Stretton, M.V.O. (5th Class), Director of Music, Royal Military School of Music.
- Lieut.-Colonel Francis Tyrell Murray, Indian Army, Supply and Transport Corps, on special duty, Coronation Durbar, Delhi.
- William Maxwell, Esq., C.I.E., Indian Civil Service, Postmaster-General, Punjab.
- Major Cecil Delarne Mears, Squadron Officer, 8th Cavalry.
- Captain John Stafford Barker, Royal Engineers, Garrison Engineer, Quetta, on special duty, Coronation Durbar, Delhi.
- Lieut.-Colonel Guy Lushington Holland, Indian Army, Commandant 23rd Pioneers.
- Lieut.-Colonel Charles Gilbert Carnegy, Indian Army, Commandant 107th Pioneers.
- Lieut.-Colonel Charles Wyndham Somerset, Indian Army, Commandant 107th Pioneers.
- Major Ernest Henry Scott Cullen, Indian Army, 32nd Pioneers.
- Major Henry Francis Edward Freeland, Royal Engineers, Traffic Superintendent, North-Western Railway, on special duty, Coronation Durbar.
- Rai Bahadur Ganga Ram, Esq., C.I.E., Public Works Department, Punjab (retired).
- Muhammad Ali, District Judge and Magistrate of Tawargarh, Gwalior State.
- Lieut.-Colonel Arthur Henry Dopping Creagh, 128th Pioneers.
- Lieut.-Colonel Philip Geoffrey Twining, 1st Sappers and Miners.
- Sir Arthur Milford Ker, C.I.E., Honorary Treasurer King Edward All India Memorial.
- Captain George Henry Willis, R.E., Officiating Mint Master, Calcutta.
- Ivor Cradock Thomas, Esq., Director Indian Telegraph Department.
- Alexander Carmichael Stewart, Esq., Deputy Inspector-General, Punjab Police.
- Captain Malik Umar Hyat Khan, C.I.E., Indian Herald.

=== Member of the Royal Victorian Order, fifth class (MVO) ===
- Lancelot Colin Bradore Glascock, Esq., Indian Police, Superintendent of Police, Lahore.
- Frederick Theodore Jones, Esq., Assistant Engineer, Public Works Department, United Provinces, on special duty, Coronation Durbar, Delhi.
- Bhai Ram Singh, Sardar Bahadur, Provincial Educational Service, Principal of the Mayo School of Art, Lahore.
- Ali Husain, Lieutenant, 2nd Gwalior Infantry.

== Baronet ==
- Sir Sassoon Jacob David, Knight, an Additional Member of the Council of the Governor of Bombay for making Laws and Regulations.

== Knight Bachelor ==
- James Molesworth Macpherson, Esq., C.S.I., Barrister-at-Law, Secretary to the Government of India in the Legislative Department, and an Additional Member of the Council of the Governor-General for making Laws and Regulations.
- Mr Justice Cecil Michael Wilford Brett, C.S.I., Indian Civil Service, Puisne Judge of the High Court of -Judicature at Fort William in Bengal.
- Mr Justice Asutosh Mukharji, C.S.I., Puisne Judge of the High Court of Judicature at Fort William in Bengal, and Vice-Chancellor and Fellow of the Calcutta University.
- Mr Justice Henry George Richards, K.C., Chief Justice of the High Court of Judicature, North-Western Provinces, and Vice-Chancellor of the Allahabad University.
- Mr Justice Hugh Daly Griffin, Puisne Judge of the High Court of Judicature, North Western Provinces.
- Ralph Percy Ashton, Esq., President of the Mining and Geological Institute, Calcutta.
- Khan Bahadur Bezonji Dadabhoy Mehta, Nagpur.
- Cecil William Noble Graham, Esq., President, Bengal Chamber of Commerce, a Trustee of the Victoria Memorial Hall, and an Additional Member of the Council of the Governor-General for making Laws and Regulations.
- Lieutenant-Colonel Charles Henry Bedford, M.D., D.Sc., Indian Medical Service, Chemical Examiner, Bengal.
- Hugh Stein Fraser, Esq., of Madras, an Additional Member of the Council of the Governor of Fort St George for making Laws and Regulations.
- Mr Justice Dinshaw Dhanjibhai Davar, Puisne Judge of the High Court of Judicature at Bombay.
- Shapurji Burjorji Broacha, Esq., Sheriff of Bombay.
- Rao Sahib Vasanji Trikamji Mulji, Head of the Jain community, a Justice of the Peace, and an Honorary Magistrate for the City of Bombay.
- Ibrahim Rahimtoola, Esq., C.I.E., a Justice of the Peace for the City of Bombay, a Fellow of the Bombay University, and an Additional Member of the Council of the Governor of Bombay for making Laws and Regulations.
- James Begbie, Esq., Secretary and Treasurer of the Bank of Bombay, and an Additional Member of the Council of the Governor of Bombay for making Laws and Regulations.

== Imperial Service Order ==
- Henry Lawrence French, Superintendent, Finance Department, Imperial Secretariat.
- Sheikh Sadi, Assistant, Record Department, Government of India Secretariat.
- Edmund Wilfrid Baker, Personal Assistant to the Finance Member, Government of India.
- Upendra Nath Chatterji, Cashier, Legislative Department, Government of India.
- Stanilaus Kortka Murphy, Superintendent, Education Department.
- Rai Bahadur Rala Ram, Deputy Engineer-in-Chief, Eastern Bengal State Railway.
- Thomas William Payne, Registrar, Legislative Department.
- Babu Narayan Kissen Sen, Storekeeper, Office of Controller of Printing, Stationery, and Stamps.
- Roderick Korneli Biernacki, Locomotive Superintendent, North-Western Railway.
- Jehangir Dosabhai Framji, Special Collector, Bombay.
- Thomas Oakley Drake, Registrar, Department of Commerce and Industry.
- Rao Bahadur Rudraganda Chenvivganda Artal, Deputy Collector, Bombay.
- James Salt, Chief Clerk, Office of Director-General of Military Works.
- Joseph Bocarro, Assistant Secretary, Bombay Secretariat.
- Charles William Caston, Registrar, Home Department.
- Rao Bahadur Gobindram Salamatrai, Deputy Collector, Sind.
- Joseph Edward Lacey, Assistant Secretary, Government of India Public Works Department.
- Ahsan-ud-Din, Magistrate and Collector, Bengal.
- Charles Albert Pogson, Assistant Collector, Salt Department, Bombay.
- Babu Umesh Chandra Das, Civil Surgeon, Bengal.
- John Alexander McIver, Superintendent, Photo-Zincographic Department, Bombay.
- Mirza Irfan Ali Beg, Deputy Collector, United Provinces.
- Walter Henry Thomson, Deputy Collector, Bengal.
- Taw Sein Ko, Superintendent, Archaeological Survey, Burma.
- Walter Arthur Shilstone, Assistant Secretary, Government of Eastern Bengal and Assam.
- Maung Ogh, Extra Assistant Commissioner, Burma.
- Gerald Aylmer Lovett-Yeats, Factory Superintendent, Opium Department, United Provinces.
- Mahdi Hasan, Officiating Deputy Commissioner, Central Provinces.
- Robert Henry Niblett, Deputy Collector, United Provinces.
- Rai Sahib Gajju Mai, Head Clerk, Office of Political Agent, Khyber.
- Charles Edward Browne, Extra Assistant Commissioner, Burma.
- Pandit Nand Lai, Extra Assistant to the Agent to Governor-General, Central India.
- Walter James Bagley, Extra Assistant Commissioner, Central Provinces.
- Mir Shams Shah, Extra Assistant Commissioner, Baluchistan.
- Albert George Lincoln, Registrar, Office of Chief Commissioner, North-West Frontier Province.
- Parambil Tharyan Tharyan Avargal, Registrar of Secretariat, Madras.
- Major Allen Mellers Anscomb, V.D., Baluchistan Volunteer Rifles, Extra Assistant Commissioner, Baluchistan.
- Dewan Bahadur Annaji Aiyangar Krishnaswatni Aiyangar Avargal, Acting Deputy Commissioner, Salt, Abkari, and Separate Revenue Department, Madras.
- George William Marshall, Registrar, Foreign Department.
- Canchi Sarvothama Row Avargal, Registrar of Assurances, Madras.
- Augustus Stapleton, Superintendent, Foreign Department.
- Bhimanakunte Hanumantha Row Avargal, Professor, College of Engineering, Madras.

== King's Police Medal ==
- Frederick Fawcett, Retired Deputy Inspector-General of Police, Indian Police, Madras.
- Frank Armitage, Deputy Inspector-General of Police and Commissioner of Police, Madras City.
- Cyril Chapman Longden, District Superintendent of Police, 3rd Grade, Indian Police, Madras.
- C. S. Sundara Mudaliyar, Deputy Superintendent of Police, 3rd Grade, Madras Police.
- Veerabadra Pillai, Constable, Madura District, Madras Police.
- Mahim Shah Chamnad, Sub-Inspector of Police, 3rd Grade, Madras Police.
- Douglas Graeme Ommanney, Superintendent of Police, 4th Grade, Indian Police, Bombay.
- Charles Southey Marston, Superintendent of Police, 4th Grade, Indian Police, Bombay.
- John Benjamin Samson, Deputy Superintendent of Police, 2nd Grade, Bombay Police.
- Bhikajee Hurry More, Constable, 1st Grade, Bombay Police.
- Laltapersad Lakhaipersad, Head Constable, 4th. Grade, Bombay Police.
- Charles Augustus Tegart, Deputy Commissioner of Police in Charge of the Special Branch, Indian Police, Calcutta.
- Henry Charles Richardson, Inspector of Police, 4th. Grade, Bengal Police.
- Babu Bhawani Nath Nandi, B.A., Deputy Superintendent of Police, 4th Grade, Bengal Police.
- Babu Kumud Mohan Das Gupta, Inspector of Police, Special Department, 2nd Grade, Bengal Police.
- Babu Sushil Chandra Ghose, Inspector of Police, Special Department, 3rd Grade, Bengal Police.
- Babu Ranjit Kumar Banerjee, Officiating Inspector of Police, Special Department, 4th Grade, Bengal Police.
- Saiyid Ahmad Husain, Inspector of Police, 3rd Grade, United Provinces Police.
- Ganga Sahai, Sub-Inspector of Police, United Provinces Police.
- Sohrab Khan, Sub-Inspector of Police, United Provinces Police.
- Abdul Hamid Khan, Sub-Inspector, Civil Police, United Provinces Police.
- Yakub Ali Khan, Inspector of Police, United Provinces Police.
- Malik Sher Bahadur Khan, Inspector of Police, Punjab Police.
- Sheikh Abdulla, Deputy Superintendent of the Criminal Investigation Department, Punjab Police.
- Sardar Bishan Singh, Deputy Superintendent of Police, Punjab Police.
- Edward Gordon Stuart Borthwick, Deputy Superintendent of Police, Punjab Police.
- Sidheswar Bose, Inspector of Criminal Investigation Department, Punjab Police.
- Francis Stephen Lincoln, Inspector of Railway Police, Punjab Police.
- Jugmohun Singh, Head Constable, Civil Police, Burma Police.
- Percy John Arthur Goodenough Porter, District Superintendent of Police, Indian Police, Burma.
- Ashby St John Ingle, District Superintendent of Police (retired), Indian Police, Burma.
- Maung Chan Tha, Constable, Civil Police, Burma Police.
- Mehta Ramji Mai, Rai Sahib, Deputy Superintendent of Police, Burma Police.
- Thomas Edwin Furze, Assistant Superintendent of Police, Indian Police (Eastern Bengal and Assam).
- Aswini Kumar Guha, Inspector of Police, Eastern Bengal and Assam Police.
- Chena Ram, Constable, Eastern Bengal and Assam Police.
- Shew Shukul Upadhaya. Constable, Eastern Bengal and Assam Police.
- Subudar Kharka Singh Thapa, Eastern Bengal and Assam Military Police.
- Sardar Bahadur Subadar Arjun Ray, Eastern Bengal and Assam Military Police.
- Isurdin, Constable, Akola District, Central Provinces Police.
- Dhiraj Singh, Circle Inspector, Jubbulpore District, Central Provinces Police.
- Michael Donlea, Inspector of Police, North-West Frontier Province Police.
- Harry Gordon Waterfield, Assistant in the Criminal Branch and Inspector-General of the Central India Agency Police.
- Cyril Montague Bunbury Seagrim, Inspector-General of Police, Indore State.
- Rai Sahib Ganesh Dass, Inspector of Police, Quetta City, Baluchistan Police.
