= Maqbool Rahimtoola =

Pakistani politician

Maqbool H. H. Rahimtoola

Minister for Textiles and Commerce (caretaker)
- In office 2 April 2013 – 7 June 2013
- President: Asif Ali Zardari
- Prime Minister: Mir Hazar Khan Khoso (caretaker)

Personal details
- Born: 1945 (age 80–81)
- Parent(s): Habib Rahimtoola (father); Zubeida Habib Rahimtoola (mother)

Maqbool Habib H. Rahimtoola (born 1945) is a businessman and politician based out of Karachi, Pakistan. He served as Minister for Textiles and Commerce in the Khoso caretaker ministry in 2013. He also remained a provincial minister in the Caretaker Government of Sindh during 1996–97.

== Early life ==
He was born to Habib Rahimtoola and Zubeida Habib Rahimtoola. He received his early education from Karachi Grammar School and Westminster School in the United Kingdom. He graduated from McGill University in 1968.

== Career ==
He served as the Federal Minister of Commerce and the Textile Industries of Pakistan in the Khoso caretaker ministry in 2013. From 1996 to 1997, he simultaneously served as Sindh Minister for 11 ministries: Local Govt., Industries, Commerce, Mines and Minerals, Housing, Town Planning, Labor, Transport, Kaatchi Abadies, Public Health Engineering, Rural Development, c 1996–1997. He chaired several public sector organisations. He was leader of the Pakistan Delegation to Trade Minister Conference AIMS 2013.

He served as managing director of investment company Bandenawaz (Pvt) Ltd. He served as chair of Berger Paints Pakistan Limited and Mirpurkhas Sugar Mills Limited. He was a director of Dadex Eternit Limited.

Rahimtoola served on many committees of the Karachi Chamber of Commerce & Industry, FPCCI, the Standards Institute of Pakistan and the Board of Investment (GOP). He is a Member of the Petroleum Institute of Pakistan. He led the Pakistan Business Delegation to the United Nations on occasions such as the UNCTAD/GATT Seminar in Hong Kong and was the Pakistan Representative to UNIDO/GATT World Packaging Conference.

He served as Secretary General of the Pakistan/Japan Cultural Association and the Pak-France Business Alliance. He served as a Member of the Pak-Belgium Business Forum. He served as President of Drigh Road Lions Club.

He lectured at the Air War College on Strategic Planning for Energy He served as Pro Chancellor of the Pakistan Fashion & Design Institute and Chair of the Trade Development Authority of Pakistan.

== Recognition ==
- International Trophy for Technology in Germany
- Achievement Award from the Overseas Graduates of Pakistan Club (2004)
