= Gomibai Jawaharmal Ladies Club =

- Interactive map of the Gomibai Jawaharmal Ladies Club area

General information
- Type: Social club
- Location: Larkana, Sindh, Pakistan
- Coordinates: 27°33′9″N 68°12′44″E
- Opened: 1934

Gomibai Jawaharmal Ladies Club, also known as Ladies Club, Larkana, is a women's social club located in Larkana, Sindh, Pakistan.

== History ==
Gomibai Jawaharmal Ladies Club was constructed by a Hindu deputy collector who named it in honor of his sister, Gomibai Jawaharmal. It was inaugurated on January 3, 1934, by Mrs. R. E. Gibson, the wife of a British administrator. It hosted several public figures such as Lady Mountbatten and Rana Liaquat Ali Khan, who visited after the establishment of the All Pakistan Women's Association (APWA). The club also served as a venue for the wives of Sindh's first chief minister and senior bureaucrats. Initially, the chairpersonship was traditionally held by the wife of the Larkana Deputy Collector. This practice was later replaced by a democratic system in which office bearers and the governing body are elected every two years.

Following the 1947 Partition, the club's membership changed due to the migration of Hindu families to India. Subsequent linguistic riots in the 1970s led to the relocation of many Urdu-speaking middle-class families to Karachi and Hyderabad.

In 2004, the district government attempted to sell the club's plot to a private developer for conversion into a hotel. The decision was reversed following opposition from club members and a citizens' action forum.

In 2012, the government allocated PKR 5 million for a community hall and expansion; however, only PKR 1.5 million was released, and the project remains incomplete.

In 2015, Supreme Court of Pakistan appointed a three-member bench to investigate the illegal occupation of land belonging to the club. As of 2018, implementation of the Supreme Court's orders remained incomplete. Two illegally constructed shops were vacated and began paying rent to the club, while a hotel operating on the premises continued its activities.
