= Fazal Rahimtoola =

Indian politician (1895–1977)

Sir Fazal Ibrahim Rahimatullah CIE

Personal details
- Born: 1895 Bombay, Bombay Presidency, British India
- Died: 1977 (aged 81-82) Bombay, Maharashtra, India
- Spouse: Zainab Fazalbhoy
- Parent: Sir Ibrahim Rahimtoola (father)
- Relatives: Jafar Rahimtoola (uncle); Habib Rahimtoola (brother)
- Education: St. Xavier's College, Bombay
- Occupation: Politician
- Known for: Sheriff of Bombay

Sir Fazal Ibrahim Rahimtoola CIE (1895–1977) was an Indian politician. He served as Sheriff of Bombay and was a member of Bombay Legislative Council and Central Legislative Assembly during the British Raj.

== Background and early life ==
Rahimtoola was born in Bombay, the son of Ibrahim Rahimtoola, a prominent local politician. He was educated first at St. Xavier's School, and later gained his Bachelor of Arts from the St. Xavier's College. After this he proceeded to Poona Law College for his Bachelor of Laws.

== Career ==
After graduating he initially joined the family business but later started taking part in local politics. Rahimtoola became member of the Bombay Legislative Council by the 1920s followed by the Bombay Legislative Assembly with which he was closely attached till after independence. He was also member of the Central Legislative Assembly from 1925 till the early 1930s.

In December 1928, Rahimtoola became Secretary of the All-India Muslim League Conference held in Delhi under the Presidentship of Sir Aga Khan III.

Fazal Rahimtoola remained Sheriff of Bombay during the same period. He remained President of the Indian tariff Board in 1935. During the Second World War, Rahimtoola served as Director of the National War Front and National Food Council.

In the 1960s, he served as president of the, St. Xavier's College Association, in Bombay. He died in Bombay in 1977.

== Business affairs ==
On the business front Sir Fazal served as director on companies including the auto sector, cotton, shipping among others. He was a permanent Director of Tata Iron and Steel and Tata power.

== Personal life ==
He was married to Zainab Fazalbhoy and had three sons and five daughters from marriage. His younger brother Habib Rahimtoola was active in the Pakistan movement and is regarded as one of the founders of Pakistan. His uncle Jafar Rahimtoola and a cousin Hoosenaly Rahimtoola both served as Mayor of Bombay.

== Honours ==
He was appointed a Companion of the Order of the Indian Empire (CIE) in the 1939 New Year Honours list, and was knighted in the 1946 Birthday Honours, thus becoming Sir Fazal Ibrahim Rahimtoola. On 20 July 1946, he was invested with his knighthood at the Viceroy's House (now Rashtrapati Bhavan) in New Delhi, by the Viceroy, Lord Wavell.
