= 1907 New Year Honours =

Appointments by Edward VII to various orders and honours

The New Year Honours 1907 were appointments by Edward VII to various orders and honours to reward and highlight good works by members of the British Empire. They were published on 1 January 1907.

The recipients of honours are displayed here as they were styled before their new honour, and arranged by honour, with classes (Knight, Knight Grand Cross, etc.) and then divisions (Military, Civil, etc.) as appropriate.

== Order of the Star of India ==
=== Knights Grand Commander (GCSI) ===
- His Highness Maharaja Sri Krishnaraja Wadiar Bahadur of Mysore.

=== Knights Commander (KCSI) ===
- John Prescott Hewett, Esq, CSI, CIE, Indian Civil Service, Lieutenant-Governor designate of the United Provinces of Agra and Oudh.

=== Companions (CSI) ===
- Murray Hammick, Esq, CIE, Indian Civil Service, Chief Secretary to the Government of Madras, at present acting as a Member of the Council of the Governor of Madras.
- William Henry White, Esq, Chief Engineer and Secretary to the Government of Bombay, Public Works Department, and an Additional Member of the Council of the Governor of Bombay for making Laws and Regulations.

== Order of Indian Empire ==
=== Knights Grand Commander (GCIE) ===
- Honorary Major His Highness Maharaja Raj Kajeshwar Siromani Sri Sir Ganga Singh Bahadur of Bikaner, KCSI, KCIE, and Honorary Aide-de-Camp to His Royal Highness the Prince of Wales.

=== Knights Commander (KCIE) ===
- Herbert Hope Risley, Esq, CSI, CIE, Indian Civil Service, Secretary to the Government of India in the Home Department.
- Francis Whitmore Smith, Esq, CIE, Assistant Secretary in the Military Department, India Office.

=== Companions (CIE) ===
- Ibrahim Rahimtoola, an Additional Member of the Council of the Governor of Bombay for making Laws and Regulations.
- Pandit Sunder Lai, Rai Bahadur, Advocate, High Court of Judicature, Allahabad. Vice-chancellor of the Allahabad University and a Member of the Council of the Lieutenant-Governor of the United Provinces for making Laws and Regulations.
- Diwan Bahadur R. V. Srinivasa Aiyar, Inspector-General of Registration, Madras, and an Additional Member of the Council of the Governor of Madras for making Laws and Regulations.
- Edward Albert Gait, Esq, Indian Civil Service, Officiating Commissioner of the Chota Nagpur Division.
- Robert George Kennedy, Esq, lately Chief Engineer and Secretary to the Government of the Punjab, Public Works Department, Irrigation Branch.
- Honorary Colonel Arthur Hills Gleadowe-Newcomen, Commandant United Provinces Light Horse, Honorary Aide-de-Camp to the Viceroy, lately President of the Commercial Mission to Southern and Eastern Persia.
- Edward Anthony Doran, Esq, Postmaster-General, Bombay
- Major Henry Thomas Pease, Principal, Veterinary College, Punjab, at present Officiating Inspector-General, Civil Veterinary Department
- Major Malcolm Sydenham Clarke Campbell, Royal Artillery, Ordnance Officer, First Class, Indian Ordnance Department
- Major Arthur Le Grand Jacob, DSO, Indian Army, lately Commandant, Southern Waziristan Militia.
- John Bolster, Esq, Deputy Commissioner, Northern India Salt Department.
