= Shabudin =

Shabudin or Shabuddin is an Asian masculine given name. Notable people with the name include:

- Shabuddin H. Rahimtoola (born 1931), Indian cardiologist
- Shabudin Yahaya (born 1965), Malaysian politician
