= General Money =

General Money may refer to:

- Arthur Wigram Money (1866–1951), British Army major general
- Ernest Money (1866–1952), British Indian Army brigadier general
- John Money (aeronaut) (1752–1817), British Army general
- Noel Money (1867–1941), British Army brigadier general
- Robert Cotton Money (1888–1985), British Army major general
