= Habib Rahimtoola =

Diplomat in Pakistan

Habib Ibrahim Rahimtoola

Personal details
- Born: 10 March 1912 Bombay, Bombay Presidency, British India
- Died: 2 January 1991 (aged 78) Karachi, Sindh, Pakistan
- Spouse: Zubeida Rahimtoola
- Parent: Ibrahim Rahimtoola (father)
- Education: St. Xavier's College
- Occupation: Diplomat, Politician, Industrialist

Habib Ibrahim Rahimtoola (10 March 1912 – 2 January 1991) was a Pakistani politician, and diplomat primarily based in Karachi. He served as Pakistan's High Commissioner to the United Kingdom (1947–52). Rahimtoola also served as Governor of Sindh (1953–54) and later as the Governor of Punjab (1954). He is considered one of the founders of Pakistan for his involvement as a leader of the Pakistan Movement.

== Early life and political career ==
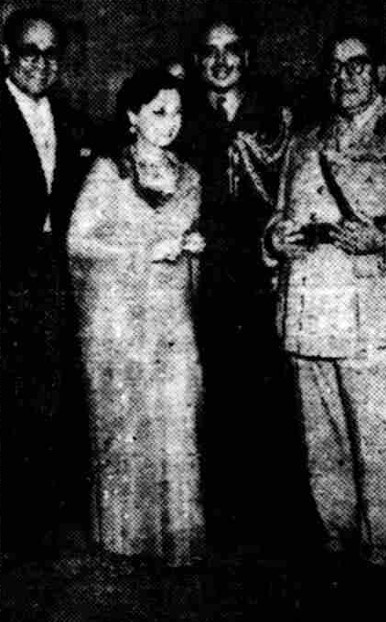
Left to right: Habib with his wife Zubeida Rahimtoola, Brigadier Syed Ghawas, and General SMA Faruki at the Pakistan House in London (1951)

Rahimtoola was initially educated at St. Xavier's School, Calcutta, where he also received his Bachelor of Arts at the affiliated St. Xavier's College, Kolkata, both being in the top tier of educational institutions in Calcutta. He then received an LL.B 1935.

He entered politics at an early age and became Secretary General of the Muslim Students Union at his college between 1927 and 1931. After completing his further education Rahimtoola proceeded to business affairs. He was also a supporter of the Muslim League. He founded and was the first president of the Bombay Provincial Muslim Chamber of Commerce (1944–47) and was also president of the Muslim Chamber of Commerce Delhi (1947–48).

Following the path to Partition of India, Habib Rahimtoola canvassed for the Muslim League in the 1946 elections. He was president of the Bombay Muslim League Parliamentary Board for Local Bodies from 1945 until 1947. Simultaneously he also remained President of the Bombay Muslim Students Union from 1946 to 1948. Jinnah had also nominated him to be the senior Muslim member in the Government of India's Food Delegation to the United Kingdom and United States in 1946.

By August 1947, Habib Rahimtoola was sent to receive the Independence of Pakistan formally from the British Government. He also held the honor of unfurling the Pakistan Flag abroad for the first time. Rahimtoola remained Ambassador of Pakistan to the United Kingdom during this period from 1947 until 1952. He was the leader of Pakistani delegations including the Inter-Allied Repatriation Agency 1948, Prime Minister's Conference London 1948, Freedom of the Press Conference 1948, International Trade and Employment Conference Geneva 1948, Commonwealth Finance Ministers Conference 1949, South East Asian Conference on Colombo Plan 1950, G.A.T.T. Conference 1951 and Commonwealth Finance Minister's Conference 1952.

In 1952 Habib Rahimtoola officially formed part of the proclamation of Queen Elizabeth II to the throne of the United Kingdom. In the same year he was appointed as Ambassador to France where he stayed until the end of 1953. During his tenure, In 1953 he led the Pakistani Delegation to UNESCO in Paris.

By 1953 Rahimtoola returned to Pakistan and took over as Governor of Sind. He held the post for just over a year until the end of 1954. In 1954 he was posted to Punjab as Governor.

== Honors ==
Habib Rahimtoola was Fellow of the Royal Photographic Society, Royal Society of Arts and the Royal Commonwealth Society.

He was recipient of the Melvin Jones Award from the United States.

Rahimtoola was also recipient of the First Class Order of the Sacred Treasure from the Emperor of Japan. He founded the Photographic Society of Pakistan.

== Other political offices ==
Apart from being the Governor of Punjab and Governor of Sindh, he served as the Federal Minister of Commerce and Industries of Pakistan and chairman Pakistan Red Cross. He continued in public service until his retirement in the late 1970s.

== Business affairs ==
In the late 1950s, he entered private business by setting up an investment company called Bandenawaz (Pvt) Ltd. Habib also served as Minister in various capacities of Commerce, Industries and Petroleum. He also led the Pakistan trade delegations to the Afro Asian Conference in Bundung 1955 and British East Africa 1956. After the declaration of martial law in 1958 under General Ayub Khan, Habib Rahimtoola withdrew from active politics. He was though appointed as chairman of the newly formed Karachi Development Authority in 1958 – as a post he held until 1960.

During the 1960s, Habib Rahimtoola ventured and focused into industrial business. He was chairman of the board of directors of several reputable firms, namely, British Oxygen Limited, Pakistan Cables Limited, United Bank Limited, Brooke Bond Limited, Bandenawaz Limited, Metal Box [Pakistan] Limited, Aspro Nicholas Pakistan Limited, Chambon Pakistan Limited, Organon Pakistan Limited, and Coates Brothers Pakistan Limited.

Following the separation of East Pakistan in 1971, Habib Rahimtoola's business interests suffered a major setback. He however continued his support for Pakistan serving as Chair of the Pakistan Red Cross on the insistence of then President Yahya Khan, followed by the tenure of Zulfiqar Ali Buutto. Rahimtoola was awarded the Pakistan Movement Gold Medal by Prime Minister Junejo in 1987.

He also served on the boards of various multinational and national companies in Pakistan as either a director or chairman, including United Bank Ltd, Eastern Federal Insurance, Brooke Bond, Pakistan Oxygen (now BOC Pakistan), Aspro-Nicholas (now Reckitt Benckiser), Organon Pakistan (part of AkzoNobel) and Pakistan Cables (BICC).

== Accolade ==
The road connecting Shahr-e-Faisal to the National Stadium in Karachi is named 'Habib Rahimtoola Road' in lieu of his services as founding Chairman of the Karachi Development Authority

In 2002 the Pakistan Post issued commemorative stamps of Habib Rahimtoola on occasion of the 55th Independence Day Celebrations

== Personal life ==
Habib Rahimtoola's father Sir Ibrahim Rahimtoola was a noted Indian Politician who remained Mayor of Bombay city and served as President of the Central Legislative Assembly.

His uncle Jaffer Rahimtoola and cousin Hoosenally Rahimtoola both served as active Bombay Legislators and remained Mayors accordingly.

His brother Fazal Rahimtoola remained an active Politician before and after partition of the Indian sub-continent.

Habib married Zubeida Sultan Chinoy in 1936. The couple had two sons and one daughter from their union.

== Death ==
Habib Rahimtoola died on 2 January 1991 whilst resident in Karachi, Pakistan. His obituary was published in the United Kingdom in connection with the relationships he had established and nurtured over a lifetime.

Political offices
Preceded by Mian Aminuddin	Governor of Punjab	Succeeded by Mushtaq Ahmed Gurmani
