= Frank Smallwood =

English cricketer and soldier (1888–1953)

Personal information
- Full name: Frank Graham Smallwood
- Born: 10 February 1867; Calcutta, Bengal Presidency, British India
- Died: 30 December 1919 (aged 52); Poona, Bombay Presidency, British India
- Batting: Unknown

Domestic team information
- Years: Team
- 1893/94: Europeans

Career statistics
Competition	First-class
Matches	1
Runs scored	15
Batting average	7.50
100s/50s	–/–
Top score	10
Catches/stumpings	–/–
- Source: ESPNcricinfo, 8 December 2022

Frank Graham Smallwood CVO (10 February 1867 — 30 December 1919) was an English first-class cricketer and British Army officer.

The son of Albert Edward and Margaret Anne Smallwood, he was born in British India at Calcutta in February 1867. He was educated at Rugby School, where he played for the school cricket team. From Rugby he attended the Royal Military Academy, Woolwich. Smallwood graduated from there into the Royal Artillery (RA) as a lieutenant in July 1886. He went to British India with the RA, taking part in the Sikkim expedition of 1888. In May 1891, he was seconded for service with the Indian Ordnance Service. In India, Smallwood made a single appearance in first-class cricket for the Europeans cricket team against the Parsees at Bombay in the Bombay Presidency Match of August 1893. Batting twice in the match, he was dismissed for 10 runs by Nasarvanji Bapasola in the Europeans first innings, while in their second innings he was dismissed for 5 runs by B. C. Machhliwala.

In the RA, Smallwood served in the Chitral Expedition of 1895, and was promoted to captain in July 1897. He was made a Member of the Royal Victorian Order, 4th Class in May 1906 in recognition of his service during the Prince and Princess of Wales' tour to India. Promoted to major, he was made a Commander of the Royal Victorian Order in December 1911, in connection with the Delhi Durbar of 1911. Having been appointed an assistant director of ordnance stores in India in June 1914, Smallwood subsequently served in the First World War and was promoted to lieutenant colonel in October 1914. Following the war, he was promoted to colonel in October 1919, with seniority from October 1918. Smallwood died suddenly from heart failure at King George's Hospital in Poona in December 1919.
