= George Casson Walker =

Sir George Casson Walker KCSI (9 July 1854 – April 1925) was a British administrator in the Indian Civil Service. He served as Financial Minister in the government of Asaf Jah VI, the Nizam of Hyderabad.

== Biography ==
He was educated at Winchester College and New College, Oxford.

He joined the Indian Civil Service in 1878, and began his career as Assistant Political Officer at Kabul between 1878 and 1880. He later served largely in the Punjab and roles included Assistant Commissioner in 1884, Under Secretary (Finance and Commerce Department) - Government of India in 1886, Settlement Officer in 1888, both Director of Agriculture and Deputy Commissioner in 1892, Commissioner of Excise in 1895 and Officiating Revenue Commissioner in 1901.

In 1902 he became Financial Minister of Hyderabad State. Walker was tasked with improving the finances of the state, which had deteriorated in recent years. He proved a success in the role, effectively re-organising the state's finances and helping to increase the prestige of Hyderabad. In the 1911 Delhi Durbar Honours he was made a Knight Commander of the Order of the Star of India. Following the death of Asaf Jah VI in 1911, he returned to Britain and settled in Hove. He died in April 1925.

== Personal life ==
He married Fanny Coates in 1883, and they had two daughters. In 1910, Fanny was awarded the Kaisar-i-Hind Medal for her work in establishing a girls school in Hyderabad, now known as Mahboobia Girls School.
