= Razia Rahimtoola =

Pakistani pediatrician

Professor Razia Rahimtoola
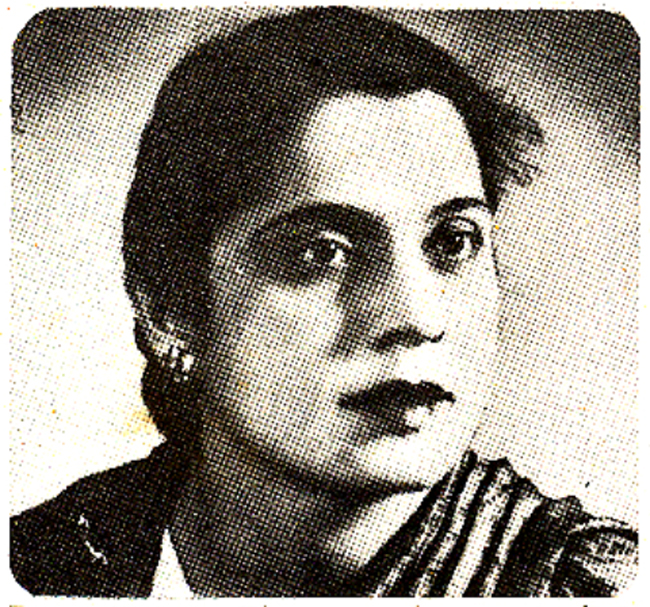
- Born: 29 August 1919; Bombay
- Died: 13 November 1988 (aged 69); Karachi
- Education: MBBS, FCRP, FCPS, DCH
- Alma mater: Grant Medical College
- Occupations: Pediatrician, Physician
- Known for: Chair of Pediatrics Jinnah Post Graduate Medical Centre

Razia Rahimtoola (Urdu: رضیہ جعفررحمۃاللہ; born Razia A. K. Gul-Mohammad in Bombay on 29 August 1919; died 13 November 1988 in Karachi) was a pioneering Pakistani pediatrician. Rahimtoola was the first woman to be elected a fellow of the Royal College of Physicians. She was Chair of Pediatrics at the Jinnah Post Graduate Medical Centre, Karachi.

== Education and career ==
She graduated M.B.B.S. from Grant Medical College in 1942, after which she worked as house physician for six months in J.J. Hospital Bombay.

She was then commissioned in the I.M.S/L.A.M.C. and rose to the rank of acting Major functioning as a graded physician. Following the partition of the sub-continent in 1947 she resigned from the commission and proceeded to the United Kingdom for postgraduate studies. She secured her D.C.H. London in 1951 followed by M.R.C.P. Edinburgh in 1953. During her stay in the United Kingdom she also worked as Senior House Officer and Senior Registrar in South Wales.

Upon her return to Pakistan in 1953, Dr. Rahimtoola was appointed as Assistant Professor of Medicine, Dow Medical College and Associate Physician, Civil Hospital, Karachi. It was during this period (1962) that she qualified for a Fulbright Grant and hence received training in Pediatrics Cardiology under Helen Tausiq at Johns Hopkins, Baltimore, United States.

Towards the end of 1963 Dr. Razia was appointed in Pediatrics at the Jinnah Post Graduate Medical Centre Karachi. She was awarded the F.R.C.P. in 1964. Following retirement of Prof. Hamid M. Khan in 1972, she was selected as Chair of Pediatrics, JPMC. During this period she was also conferred Fellowship by the College of Physicians and Surgeons Pakistan. She was also awarded a gold medal by the President of Pakistan for her contributions towards Child Health and Pediatrics.

== Research and publications ==
Razia Rahimtoola was involved in publication works which covered subjects in General Medicine and Pediatrics including Hypertrophic pulmonary osteoarthropathy, post-vaccinial encephalomyelitis tuberculosis meningitis, amoebiasis, scleroderma, Congenital abnormalities in the new-born, Thalassaemia and other hematological disorders in children, Cerebral Palsy in children, Perinátal mortality etc. published in Pakistani Journals and International journals such as Acta Paediatrica. Dr Rahimtoola devoted her time to under nutrition and malnutrition in children in Khudadad Colony, Mahmudabad, Karachi with some assistance from the Pakistan Medical Research Council and published her findings. She was a contributor to Ilyas and Ansari's Text Book on Community Medicine and to the Text Book of Pediatrics for Developing Countries edited by Wasti, Arif and Hanif. Her most monumental work is a tome on Pediatrics which she had edited and prepared with the help of many collaborators.

== Accolades ==
Razia Rahimtoola was noted as a 'teacher to remember' for her detailed studies on infant and child nutrition.

Professor Rahimtoola was described as a 'jewel' for her work towards humanity and the medical profession in general.

== Personal life ==
She was married to a lawyer based out of Karachi. They did not have any children. She died after a difficult illness.

Her father in law, Hoosenaly Rahimtoola was a well known Legislator of the Bombay Presidency in British India.

== Awards ==
- Gold Medal for contributions to Pediatrics by President of Pakistan
