= George Harris (physician) =

British physician

Major-General George Harris CSI FRCP
- Born: 29 February 1856
- Died: 16 April 1931 (aged 75); London, England
- Military career
- Allegiance: United Kingdom
- Branch: British Indian Army
- Rank: Major General
- Awards: Companion of the Order of the Star of India

Major-General George Francis Angelo Harris CSI FRCP (29 February 1856 – 16 April 1931) was Inspector General of Civil Hospitals in the Punjab, United Provinces and Bengal. He served as Professor and Physician at the Calcutta Medical School and in 1914 was made Honorary Surgeon to King George V and the Viceroy of India.

== Early life ==
Harris was born on 29 February 1856. He was the son of Major-General Charles Shooter Harris of the Bengal Staff Corps. He was educated at Bedford Modern School and St George’s Hospital qualifying as M.R.C.S. and L.R.C.P. In 1902 he passed the M.D. degree at the University of Durham.

== Career ==
Harris entered the Indian Medical Service in 1878 and in 1880 served in the latter stage of the Second Afghan War.

In 1885, Harris became Civil Surgeon of Simla and in 1890 was made Civil Surgeon of Nagpur, a position he held until 1898. In 1900 he was selected for the Chair of Materia Medica at the Medical College, Calcutta and Physician of the College Hospital. In 1908 he was appointed Inspector-General of Civil Hospitals in the Punjab and United Provinces, taking up the same role in Bengal between 1910 and 1915.

Harris wrote frequently in the Indian Medical Gazette and the British Medical Journal. He was made a Fellow of the Royal College of Physicians in 1903 and Companion Order of the Star of India in 1911. The same year he was elected President of The Asiatic Society for 1911–12. In 1914 he was made Honorary Surgeon to King George V and to the Viceroy of India.

== Family life ==
In 1883, Harris married Alice, daughter of General Archibald Edwards Campbell, formerly of the Bengal Staff Corps. Harris died in London on 16 April 1931 and was survived by two sons and four daughters.
