= Shamsuddin H. Rahimtoola =

Principal & MS Civil Hospital, Karachi

Professor Shamsuddin Rahimtoola
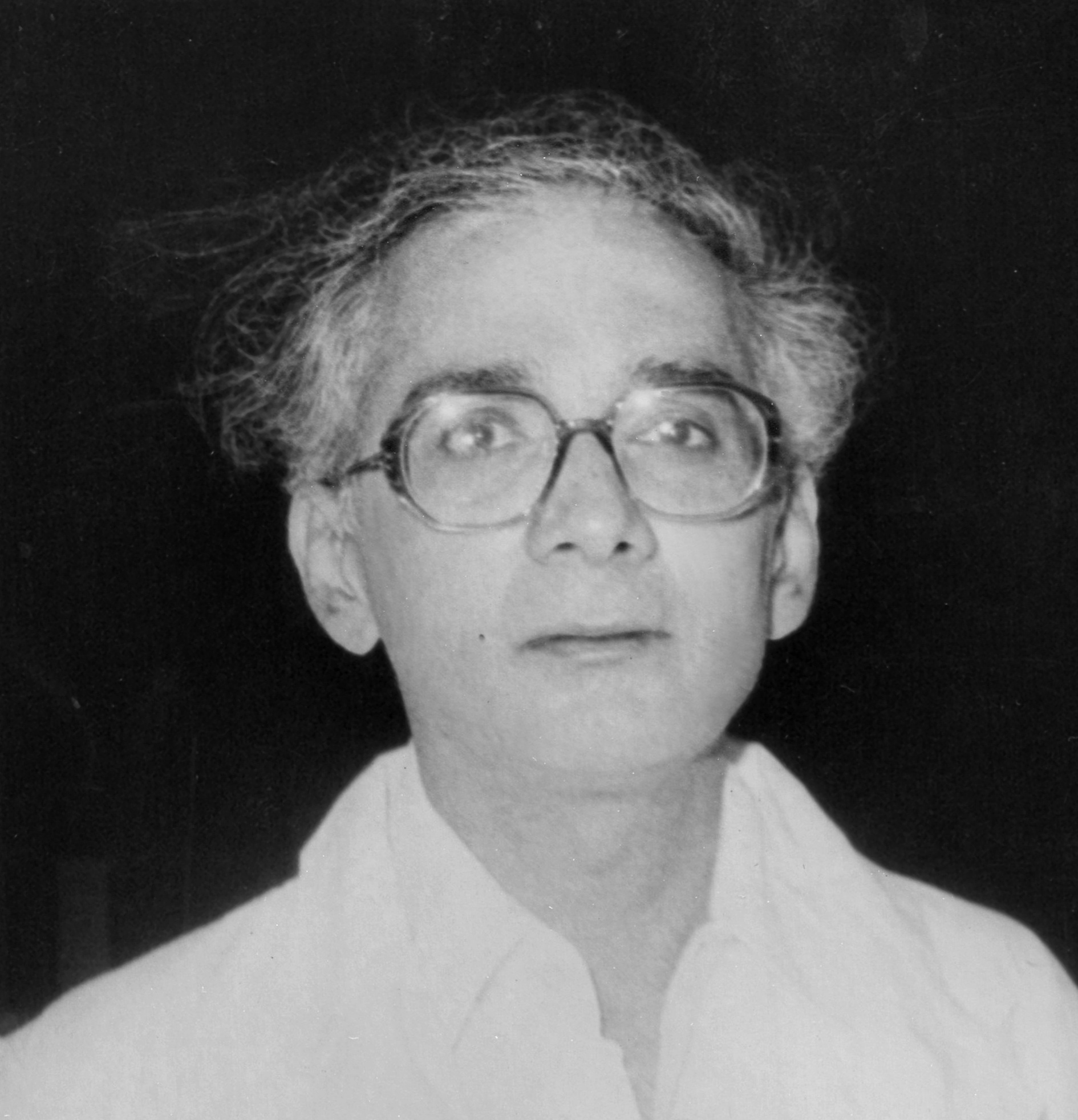
- Born: 3 October 1936; Pune, Bombay Presidency, British India
- Died: 23 October 2016 (aged 80); Karachi, Sindh, Pakistan
- Education: B.Sc, MBBS, DTMH, FRCP
- Occupation: Tropical Diseases
- Known for: Tropical Medicine, Infectious Diseases
- Title: Professor of Medicine
- Father: Hoosenally Rahimtoola

Shamsuddin Rahimtoola (3 October 1936 – 26 October 2016) was a physician based in Karachi, Pakistan, whose area of study included Tropical Medicine and infectious diseases. Rahimtoola served as the 10th Principal of Dow Medical College Karachi in 1984. He was also Medical Superintendent of the Civil Hospital in Karachi. The Dow University encompasses the Professor Shamsuddin Rahimtoola Digital Library named in his honor.

== Early life and education ==
Shamsuddin Rahimtoola was born on 3 October 1936 in Poona. He initially attended school at St. Xavier's in Bombay, a city of which his father was mayor. Following partition of the sub-continent in 1947, his family moved to Pakistan and he continued at B. V. S. Parsi High School in Karachi.

Following matriculation in 1951, Rahimtoola proceeded to D. J. Sindh Government Science College and was awarded a B.Sc. in Zoology in 1956. He received an M.B;B.S from Dow Medical College in Karachi in 1962 and worked as House officer for two years before proceeding to the United Kingdom for further education. In 1965 he completed the D.T.M.H from the University of Edinburgh with a Greig Medal. He was joint medal holder with Anne. F. Capey. This prize was specific to the Tropical Medicine department at the University of Edinburgh. In the following year [1966] he completed the M.R.C.P (Edinburgh).

== Career ==
Rahimtoola returned to Pakistan in 1966 and took up work at the Civil Hospital as Senior Registrar. He simultaneously started teaching at the Dow Medical College . Dr Rahimtoola was popular with both students and patients and by 1970 became Assistant Professor. Two years later he was promoted to Associate Professor at the College during 1972. He was regularly associated with two wards at the Hospital namely Medical Unit 2 and Medical Unit 4 which he also led at a later stage for some time. Rahimtoola attained full Professorship status during 1975 and served as Professor of Medicine at the Medical College then onward.

In 1984 Professor Rahimtoola was appointed Principal of the Dow Medical College for a brief period. He was also Medical Superintendent of attached Civil Hospital Karachi for an extended period of time. Shamsuddin Rahimtoola was one of the few individuals who retained the post of both Principal and Medical Superintendent simultaneously.

Dr Rahimtoola was credited with initiating the first Intensive Care Unit at the Civil Hospital. This later laid the foundation for a fully operational center for management and training in years to come.

He also simultaneously established a private practice at the Ankelsaria Nursing Home which he ran for several years.

Shamsuddin Rahimtoola was also officially gazetted as the Physician to the President, Prime Minister, foreign Dignitaries and associated persons for the period from 1978 onward.

Rahimtoola was noted for his 'accurate diagnostic' and 'unique teaching' skills throughout his career. He was also regarded as being an 'institution in himself' who inspired young minds. Shamsuddin Rahimtoola was also known for his exemplary charity work for poor patients at the largest tertiary care Hospital in Karachi.

== Accolades ==
The Dow University named its Digital Library after Professor Shamsuddin Rahimtoola in 2016. The Digital Library was set up earlier to establish connectivity with other HEC institutions and international academic bodies.

The Pakistan Islamic Medical Association (PIMA) dedicated its plenary session to Professor Shamsuddin Rahimtoola at the Karachi Conference in November 2016.

The News International published feature titled 'Ode to a Teacher' in honour of Professor Shamsuddin Rahimtoola. The writeup included excerpts from leading academics and medical professionals from the city of Karachi.

== Awards ==
The Dow University bestowed the 'Lifetime Achievement Award' on Shamsuddin Rahimtoola in 2013 to honor his commitment, dedication and contribution to the institution for over four decades.

Professor Abu Talib, Vice Principal of the Dow Medical College read out the citation on the occasion.

The Royal College of Physicians at Edinburgh conferred the 'Fellowship' status on Professor Rahimtoola in 1987. The president of Pakistan personally felicitated him on the occasion.

== Family ==
Shamsuddin Rahimtoola's father Hoosenally Rahimtoola was a prominent Legislator of the Bombay Presidency. He remained Mayor Bombay between 1934–35 and President of the Legislative Council during 1936-37.

Professor Rahimtoola's brother Shahbudin H. Rahimtoola has been a widely acclaimed Cardiologist serving as Distinguished Professor at the University of Southern California.

== Death ==
Shamsuddin Rahimtoola died on 23 October 2016 in Karachi. The Dow University held a condolence meeting at the Arag Auditorium where the Vice Chancellor, Professors and Administrative staff paid their respective tributes.
