= Ibrahim Rahimtoola =

Politician in British India (1862–1942)

Sir Ibrahim Rahimtoola GBE KCSI CIE
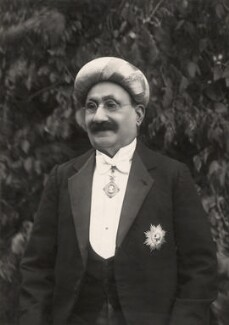
- Born: May 1862; Bombay, Bombay Presidency, British India
- Died: June 1942 (age 80); Bombay, Bombay Presidency, British India
- Occupations: Politician, Landlord
- Known for: Mayor of Bombay (1899-1900)
- Children: 3 sons and 3 daughters; incl. Sir Fazal Rahimtoola and Habib Rahimtoola
- Relatives: Jaffer Rahimtoola (Brother)

Sir Ibrahim Rahimtoola (May 1862 – June 1942) was a politician and legislator in British India. He served as Mayor of Bombay, Chairman of the Fiscal Commission and later as President of the Central Legislative Assembly.

== Early life and early career ==
Sir Ibrahim Rahimtoola was born in May 1862 in a well known merchant family in Bombay. He studied at the Elphinstone High School and showed aptitude in arithmetics, algebra and geometry. His failure in the matriculation exam of 1877 ended his scholastic career and he joined his father Rahimtoola Kaderbhoy and older brother Muhammad Rahimtoola in business. In 1880, his father died, and brothers were left without much experience in business. Rahimtoola then chose a different career thanks to various changes including the foundation of the Indian National Congress in 1885.

== Career ==
In 1892 he joined the Mandvi Ward of the Bombay Municipal Corporation. He worked in the corporation for 26 years. In 1895 he warned of a plague outbreak in Bombay and it broke out in 1897 taking countless lives. By 1898 he had become President of the Standing Committee of the corporation. In the same year the Corporation deputed him as a representative on the Improvements Trust where he served for another twenty years [1898-1918].

The following year [1899] he was elected President Mayor of the corporation. He received tremendous encouragement from Sir Pherozesha Mehta, a well known luminary of Bombay. His work for the city was recognized and he was made a Justice of Peace [J.P]. He became a member of the Bombay Legislative Council, the advisory body to the British government, in the same period [1899] thus starting a career as a parliamentarian. In August 1900 the Ismaili community honored him in a grand banquet.

By 1904 during the conference of the Congress at Bombay, he was elected to a committee of that body to consider its constitution. All through the stormy period of 1907–1910, when the bulk of the Muslims held aloof from the Indian National Congress, he lent his support equally to the Congress and the Muslim League. In 1904, he became the Sheriff of Bombay.

With the advent of the Morley-Minto Reforms, he widened his activities to take full advantage of the added privileges. He was the first, at any rate in the Bombay Council to use the right of introducing private bills. It was his Bill for the registration of charities that was introduced to the floor in 1910. Lord Thomas Sydenham, the then Governor, the Chief Justice of Bombay High Court, the Press and the general public supported the Bill accordingly.

Towards the end of 1912 he sought election to the Imperial Legislative Council. In 1913, he was elected president of the All-India Muslim League. Abul Kalam Azad hailed his presidential speech at the AIML meeting in Agra as "the first in Islamic political literature soaked in Indian nationalism." Riding on waves of worldwide Islamic outrage after the 1911 Tripoli massacre, and the British position of "neutrality" in the matter, the League that year substantially modified its pro-British "loyal" position.

Rahimtoola was re-elected for the second time in 1916. His most enduring work in the Imperial Legislative Council was in the sphere of India's commercial and industrial progress. It was due largely to his efforts that the three important commissions - The Industrial, Railway and Fiscal Commissions, which have assisted to shape the Indian government's policy in regard to industries, railways and tariff, were appointed. He was appointed the President of the Fiscal Commission in October 1921.

Sir Ibrahim Rahimtoola also proposed the British India Government to take due measure for the defense of vast Indian sea-coast. He published his article in 'The Times of India' in January, 1918 and emphasized the creation of the Indian Navy to protect the Indian coasts. The Imam also buttressed his views and according to N.M. Dumasia in 'The Aga Khan and His Ancestors' (Bombay, 1939, p. 237) that, 'The Aga Khan is strongly in favor of the view advanced by Sir Ibrahim Rahimtoola that for the defense of the extensive sea-coast of India, there should be sufficient Indian material.'

In the beginning of 1918, Sir Mahadev Bhaskar Chaubal retired from his membership of the Government of Bombay and the choice thus fell on Rahimtoola to fill that vacancy. It was a tribute to his eminence in public life and reputation for statesmanship. He also became an ordinary fellow of Bombay University by 1921.

Sir Ibrahim had intended to seek election to the Legislative Assembly after his retirement. But in May 1923 two months after his retirement from the Executive Council came the news of the demise of Sir Narayan Chandavarkar Ganesh [1855-1923], the nominated President of the Bombay Legislative Council. Rahimtoola at the earnest request of then Governor Sir George Lloyd accepted the presidency of the council. His term of the office terminated on 18 February 1925. The Governor as a non-official member of the Council further nominated him with a view to his eventual election as its president. When the nominations were announced on 19 February 1925 no one opposed the nomination. He became the first elected President of the Bombay Legislative Council.

Sir Ibrahim Rahimtoola was also an active participant in the deliberations of the All India Muslim League. He favored free and compulsory education during the 4th session at Nagpur in December 1910. He was a delegate to the first Hindu-Muslim Unity Conference, Allahabad, 1911 under the President ship of Sir William Wedderburn. He also became the President of AIML during the 7th session in Agra, 1913, and the Vice-President during the 9th session in Lucknow in December, 1916. He also presided the All India Muslim Educational Conference in Bombay on 27 December 1924. According to 'The Aga Khan and His Ancestors' (Bombay, 1939, p. 180), 'In the Bombay Presidency the community over which the Aga Khan presided with such distinction possess such eminent leaders as Sir Ibrahim Rahimtoola who, like his revered leader, valiantly pressed Muslim claims.'

Rahimtoola worked with pro-Congress leaders like Muhammad Ali Jauhar, Muhammad Ali Jinnah and the Aga Khan, and brought in an amendment to the constitution of the League, adding statement 2(d), seeking “attainment under the aegis of the British Crown a system of self Government suitable to India through constitutional means...” This marked an important shift in Indian Islamic attitudes from a position of loyalty to the government, to an alignment with the mainstream Hindu groups like the Indian National Congress.

In November 1924, he was knighted by the British Raj. A street in Bhendi Bazaar, Bombay is named after him.

Overall Sir Ibrahim Rahimtoola remained a member of Bombay Legislative Council [1899-1912], Imperial Legislative Council [1913-1916], Government's Executive Council for Education and Local Self-Government [1918-1923], the President of Legislative Council Bombay [1923-1928], Member of Indian Legislative Assembly in 1931, President of the Indian Legislative Assembly [1931 to 1933], the Chairman of Indian Fiscal Committee [1921] - the first Indian Muslim to hold this post, the member of Royal Commission on Labor in 1929 and also delegated to Round Table Conference London in 1930.

On the social welfare front Sir Ibrahim Rahimtoola was a member of Joint School Commission, the President of Muslim Gymkhana, Vice-President of Anujman-e-Islam, and the President of Mulji Jivraj Library.

== Death ==
Ibrahim Rahimtoola died in June 1942 at Bombay, aged 80.

== Relatives in politics ==
His younger brother Jafar Rahimtoola was also an active member of the Bombay Municipal Corporation and became Mayor in 1909. His elder son Sir Fazal Rahimtoola remained active in Indian Politics even after partition and was a staunch Indian Nationalist. His younger son Habib Rahimtoola was a close confidant of Jinnah and became one of the founding persons of Pakistan.

== Personal life ==
He had one son and a daughter by his first wife. He married second time in 1903, having three sons and three daughters. One of his sons, Habib Ibrahim Rahimtoola became involved in the Pakistan Movement, later serving as the first high commissioner to the United Kingdom from Pakistan, Governor of Sindh and Governor of Punjab.

== Honours ==
He was appointed a Companion of the Order of the Indian Empire (CIE) in the 1907 New Year Honours list. On 12 December 1911, he was knighted in a special honours list issued for the 1911 Delhi Durbar. He was appointed a Knight Commander of the Order of the Star of India (KCSI) in the 1923 Birthday Honours list, and also received the silver Kaisar-i-Hind medal around the same time for his valuable services and generosity. In the 1935 Birthday Honours, he was appointed a Knight Grand Cross of the Order of the British Empire (GBE).

== Accolades ==
The Bombay Municipality had given the name of the road between J.J. Hospital and Bhindi Bazaar as Sir Ibrahim Rahimtoola Road.

Aga Khan III [Sultan Mohammed Shah] regarded Sir Ibrahim highly and commented that he was the most distinguished member our community has produced in Western India.

Sir Ibrahim Rahimtoola's portrait is present in the Lok Sabha Chamber of the Indian Parliament at Delhi. This was in connection with him being former President of the Central Legislative Assembly.

President of India Pranab Mukherjee in his address to parliament in 2014 mentioned Sir Ibrahim Rahimtoola as 'one of the former Presidents of the Central Legislative Assembly who laid the solid foundations for India's parliamentary system.
