= All Pakistan Women's Association =

Non-profit organization concerned with the welfare of women in Pakistan

The All Pakistan Women's Association, or APWA, (Urdu: آل پاکستان ویمنز ایسوسی ایشن) as it is commonly known, is a voluntary, non-profit and non-political Pakistani organisation whose fundamental aim is the promotion of moral, social and economic welfare of the women of Pakistan.

APWA was founded in 1949 by Begum Ra'ana Liaquat Ali Khan, a famous women's rights activist, who had said that the role of women is no less important than that of men. Initially APWA was formed to handle the refugee crisis in the newly independent Pakistan after the 1947 partition of British India. Zaib-un-Nissa Hamidullah, Pakistan's first woman editor and publisher, was one of APWA's many prominent leaders and Zubeida Habib Rahimtoola a dedicated member of the association.

APWA has been a very active organisation since its founding, with branches in 56 districts across Pakistan, and even in rural areas. It celebrates major events such as International Women's Day, UN Day and UNICEF Day annually, and is a charity organisation which relies on donations to fund its work.

APWA received the UNESCO Adult Literacy Prize in 1974 and later the Peace Messenger Certificate in 1987.

After the secession of East Pakistan as Bangladesh in 1971, the organisation's branch in Dacca was renamed as Bangladesh Mahila Samiti.

In 2016, at the 68th anniversary of APWA's founding, an annual dinner at the High Commission of Pakistan, London was held to pay tribute to the APWA founder, Begum Ra'ana Liaquat Ali Khan. A speaker at the event said that her vision motivated Pakistani women to contribute positively to Pakistani society.

== Aims and objectives ==
The aims and objectives of the All Pakistan Women's Association are briefly stated as follows:

1. "The informed and intelligent participation of the women of Pakistan in the growth and development of their country.
2. The advancement of the welfare of Pakistani Women through the Improvement of their Legal, Political, Social, and Economic status.
3. The promotion of educational and cultural programmes and policies all over the country.
4. The Health and well-being of the people of Pakistan in the home and the community.
5. The promotion of international goodwill and the brotherhood of mankind."

== Affiliations and Associations ==
APWA enjoys consultative status with the:

1. Government of Pakistan
2. ECOSOC i.e. the economic and social council

The APWA also keeps close touch with U.N. and its specialized agencies at home and abroad.

It is internationally affiliated with many organizations, such as:

- General Federation of Women's Clubs
- International Alliance of Women

On a national level, APWA is associated with:

- Ra'ana Craftman Colony
- APWA Cottage Industries
- Gul-e-Ra'ana Community Center
- Gul-e-Ra'ana Nusrat Industrial Home
- Women's International Art Club
- General Federation of Women's Clubs (GFWC)

== Programs ==
APWA offers programs in:

- Mother and child health services
- Nutrition Programmes at healthcare clinics
- Montessori/Primary Education schools
- Adult education/Literacy
- Social Education and Social Work among the needy
- Population and Family Planning Programs
- Legal Aid clinics
- Skill Training and Handicrafts Retail Shops
- R H Education
- Adolescents Programs
- Pharmacies and Dispensaries

Memberships are open to and provided to Pakistani women regardless of their caste, creed, or colour. Non-Pakistani women are also welcome and eligible for memberships.

== Projects ==
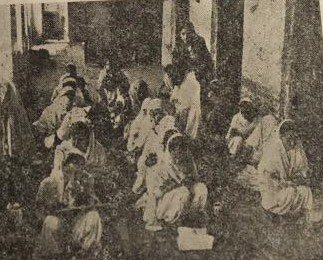
Mothers meeting

APWA, before and after the partition of east and west Pakistan, covered the following fields:

1. Social Welfare: this included numerous ventures in health volunteer training, educational programs, urban community developments, clinics, and hospitals. APWA also took the initiative in requesting a Ministry of Social Welfare and has been associated with many activities on national and international welfare agencies.
2. Education: APWA runs hundreds of primary schools and mothers' clubs, secondary schools for girls in Karachi, and promotes literacy and the importance of education by constantly upgrading educational facilities. APWA created The Karachi College of Home Sciences and Home Science departments in universities located in Lahore and Dacca.
3. Rural Reconstructions: APWA works near the Government's Village Aid Programs and has developed Community Centers to promote general rural programs.
4. International Affairs: APWA is in charge of covering all international conferences, delegations, and arranging visits for foreign guests and visitors.
5. Rights and Responsibilities for Women: APWA is responsible for educating women about their rights and responsibilities by holding seminars, and meetings and seeking any necessary legislative or other actions.

Other projects include the distribution of relief materials, cultural affairs, advice & legal assistance, publicity, and youth work.

== Financing ==
APWA receives funds from:

1. Internal fund raising efforts
2. Membership fees
3. Government grants

== Headquarters ==
APWA Headquarters are located in Karachi, Pakistan. The governing body meets annually to make its principal policies.

Branches are also located in Lahore, Peshawar, London and Sri Lanka.
