= R. V. Srinivasa Aiyar =

Diwan Bahadur Rishiyur Venkata Srinivasa Aiyar CIE

Member of Madras Legislative Council
- Incumbent
- Assumed office 1902-1909
- Governor: Oliver Russell, 2nd Baron Ampthill

Personal details
- Born: 1852 Vaiyacalathore, Madras Presidency
- Died: 1909 (aged 56–57) Madras
- Party: Indian National Congress
- Education: Government Arts College, Kumbakonam
- Occupation: Legislator, mathematician
- Profession: Civil servant

Diwan Bahadur Rishiyur Venkata Srinivasa Aiyar CIE (1852 – 31 March 1909) was an Indian civil servant, legislator and politician from the Madras Presidency.

== Early life and education ==
Srinivasa Aiyar was born to R. S. Venkatarama Aiyar and his wife, Valambal, in his maternal grandfather's house at Vaiyacalathore in 1852. He was the eldest of their four children.

== Educational career ==
On completion of his studies, Srinivasa Aiyar worked as assistant master at Wesleyan High School, Bangalore for three years and as assistant lecturer in Government Arts College, Kumbakonam from 1873 to 1884.

== Provincial Civil Service ==
In 1884, he joined the provincial civil service of Madras as an assistant in the Revenue Settlement Department. He rose to become Secretary to the Commissioner of Revenue Settlement and was, in July 1896, appointed as the Director of the Department of Land Records and Agriculture in the Madras Presidency. He became the Inspector General of Registration in December 1903 and was nominated to the Madras Legislative Council in November 1902 and for a second term on 30 October 1903.

== Proficiency in mathematics ==
Aiyar was renowned for his proficiency in mathematics and was called "Euclid" or "Geometry" Srinivasa Aiyar.

== Indian National Congress ==
Aiyar was also associated with the Indian National Congress in its early days.

== Family ==
He was the paternal uncle of R. S. Subbalakshmi, a social activist.
