= Thomas Renny-Tailyour =

Colonel Thomas Francis Bruce Renny-Tailyour CB CSI (8 June 1863 – 10 June 1937) was a British Army officer and surveyor.

Renny-Tailyour was born at Borrowfield, the family estate near to Montrose, Angus, the son of an officer of the Bengal Engineers. He was educated at Cheltenham College and the Royal Military Academy, Woolwich and was commissioned into the Royal Engineers in 1883. He served in Burma from 1885 to 1889. In 1888 he joined the Indian Army Survey Department, with which he stayed for the rest of his career. He became deputy superintendent in 1891, assistant surveyor-general in 1904, and superintendent in 1910.

He was promoted to captain on 13 August 1891, and saw active service with the China Expeditionary Force during the Boxer Rebellion in 1901. He was subsequently promoted to major on 1 April 1900, brevet colonel in 1906 and colonel on 19 July 1911.

He was appointed Companion of the Order of the Star of India (CSI) in 1911 and Companion of the Order of the Bath (CB) in the 1920 New Year Honours shortly before his retirement.
