= Ernest Money =

- Born: 11 March 1866
- Died: 4 December 1952 (aged 86)
- Military career
- Allegiance: United Kingdom
- Branch: British Indian Army
- Rank: Brigadier-General
- Conflicts: Isazai Expedition; North-West Frontier; First Waziristan Campaign; Tirah campaign; First World War
- Awards: Companion of the Order of the Indian Empire; Commander of the Royal Victorian Order; Companion of the Distinguished Service Order

Brigadier-General Ernest Douglas Money CIE CVO DSO (11 March 1866–4 December 1952) was a British Indian Army officer.

The son of Major-General Robert Money, he was born in Harbledown, Kent, and educated at Sherborne School.

He was commissioned as a lieutenant into the 4th (Militia) Battalion, King's (Shropshire Light Infantry) (later the King's Shropshire Light Infantry), in January 1886, but transferred as a second lieutenant to the Lincolnshire Regiment (later the Royal Lincolnshire Regiment) in May 1888. He soon went out to India and served as aide-de-camp to the Governor of the United Provinces from 1889 to 1890. He was promoted again to lieutenant and transferred to the British Indian Army in 1892, being posted to the 1st Prince of Wales's Own Gurkha Rifles. He took part in the Isazai Expedition of 1892, the Waziristan Expedition of 1894–1895, and the Tirah campaign of 1897–1898 and was promoted captain in May 1899 and major in May 1906.

In 1911 he was second-in-command of the 2nd Battalion, 1st Gurkha Rifles and served as assistant military secretary to King George V while he was attending the Delhi Durbar. For this he was appointed Companion of the Order of the Indian Empire (CIE). In May 1914 he was promoted to lieutenant colonel.

Money remained in India with the 2nd Battalion, 1st Gurkhas, during the First World War, taking over command in 1915. He led the battalion in the operations against the Swatis and Boners in 1915, the Mohmand Expedition in 1916–1917, and in Waziristan in 1917. During the latter campaign he temporarily commanded the 45th (Jullundur) Brigade and was awarded the Distinguished Service Order (DSO). In 1918 he was appointed inspector of Indian Depots of the 4th (Quetta) Division as a brigadier general.

In 1919, with the war now over, he commanded the Indian contingent at the Peace Parade in London, for which he was appointed Commander of the Royal Victorian Order (CVO) in the 1920 New Year Honours. He briefly took command of the 64th Indian Infantry Brigade in 1919 and the 66th Indian Infantry Brigade in 1919–1920 before retiring from the Indian Army in October 1920, being granted the honorary rank of brigadier general.

In 1933 charges against him for "intent to insult two girls" were dismissed. He had allegedly offered them sixpence to perform a sex act on him in Watford Park.
