= Zubeida Rahimtoola =

Begum Zubeida Rahimtoola
- Born: Zubeida Sultan Chinoy; 12 August 1917; Bombay, Bombay Presidency, British India
- Died: 5 July 2015 (aged 97); Karachi, Pakistan
- Other name: "Queen of Hearts"
- Known for: Social worker, Political activist
- Spouse: Habib Rahimtoola

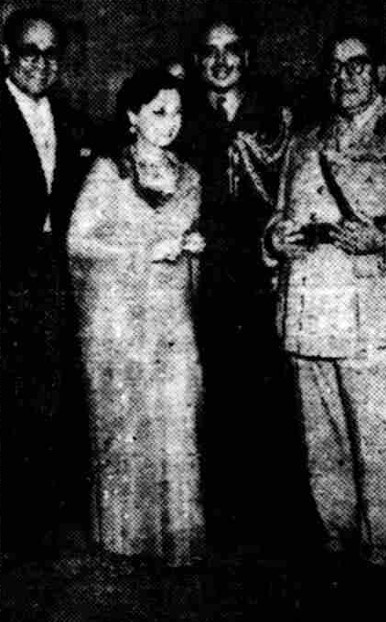
Left to right: Habib, Zubeida Rahimtoola, Brigadier Syed Ghawas, and General SMA Faruki at the Pakistan House in London (1951)

Zubeida Habib Rahimtoola (12 August 1917 – 5 July 2015), born Zubeida Sultan Chinoy in Bombay, was an activist and social worker primarily based in Karachi. She was the president of All-India Muslim League in UK and founding member of All Pakistan Women's Association. She was awarded the Sitara-e-Khidmat (Star of Service) for her services by the President Ayub Khan.

== Personal life ==
Zubeida Chinoy married Habib Rahimtoola in 1935. From that point on she took on an active social welfare front to support Muslim women in British India followed by several women development projects mainly revolving around education after creation of Pakistan.

On the family front, Zubaida Rahimtoola's father Sultan Chinoy was a businessman and had remained Mayor of Bombay [1938-39]. She had three children from her marriage to Habib Ibrahim Rahimtoola i.e. two sons and a daughter.

== Early life and career ==
She received her early education at Convent of Jesus and Mary, Bombay (present-day Mumbai) followed by matriculation at the Queen Mary's School. She then attended Elphinstone College where she obtained her Bachelor of Arts degree.

Zubeida Rahimtoola was one of the founding members of the All Pakistan Women's Association (APWA). As she was based in the United Kingdom at partition in 1947, she became the first President of APWA UK. She was the first President of the Jinnah's All-India Muslim League in the United Kingdom after the independence of Pakistan in 1947.

She returned to Pakistan in 1953 and continued her work with APWA. She led various delegations of the organization to Afro-Asia Conferences and China. Zubeida was the President of the Sindh APWA (1953–54) – then she became Vice President APWA National (1955–58). She also held the position of Chairman APWA Cottage Industry (1956–74). Finally she was the Chairman, Karachi APWA (1991–97). She also held the position of Secretary's at the Pakistan American Cultural Center in Karachi.

== Awards ==
Begum Rahimtoola was awarded the Sitara-e-Khidmat (Star of Service) by the President of Pakistan Ayub Khan in 1960 for her contributions to women's organizations in Pakistan and her work on 'West Pakistan Family Laws' including Women's Rights.

== Death ==
Zubeida Habib Rahimtoola died on 5 July 2015 at age 97 at Karachi, Pakistan.
