= Shahbudin Rahimtoola =

Cardiologist

Professor Shahbudin Rahimtoola
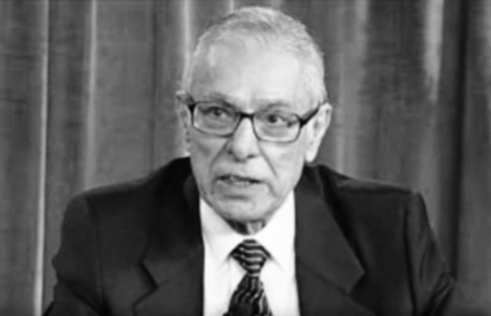
- Born: October 1931; Bombay Presidency, India
- Died: 9 December 2018 (aged 87); Los Angeles, California
- Education: MBBS, FRCP [Edin], MACP, MACC, D.Sc. (Hon)
- Occupations: Cardiologist, Physician
- Known for: Hybernating Myocardium
- Father: Hoosenally Rahimtoola
- Relatives: Shamsuddin H. Rahimtoola (brother)

Shahbudin Rahimtoola was a cardiologist based in Los Angeles, United States. He served as a Distinguished Professor at the Keck School of Medicine, University of Southern California. Rahimtoola was credited for his contribution to two clinical syndromes namely the hibernating myocardium and 'prosthetic valve-mismatch'.

== Early life and education ==
Rahimtoola was born in October 1931 to family in Bombay.

Rahimtoola graduated MBBS from Dow Medical College in 1954. After completing a house job at the Civil Hospital for three years he proceeded to the United Kingdom for further education. He received the MRCP from the Royal College of Physician of Edinburgh in 1963 and he was awarded the Fellowship [FRCP] in 1972.

== Career ==
In 1963 Rahimtoola moved to the United States. He was initially associated with the Mayo Clinic there and eventually became co-director of the Cardiac Catheterization Laboratory. On the clinical and teaching front Rahimtoola remained an Associate Professor of Medicine at the University of Illinois and Chief of Cardiology, at Cook County Hospital from 1969 to 1972. This was followed by being appointed Professor of Medicine at the University of Oregon – a post he held from 1972 to 1980. He then moved to California, where he was chief of the Division of Cardiology at the University of Southern California from 1980 to 1992. In 1984 he became the first George C. Griffith Professor of Cardiology. In 1993 he rose to become Distinguished Professor at the Keck School of Medicine, University of Southern California.

Overall Rahimtoola has been best known for his work in valvular heart disease, coronary artery disease, results of cardiac surgery, and arrhythmias along with cardio-myopathy and congenital heart disease. Rahimtoola also served on the editorial board of the Journal of the American College of Cardiology.

== Accolades ==
Rahimtoola has been termed as a 'contemporary giant' in field of Muslim contribution to medical research. Rahimtoola has also been labelled as 'Cardiologist of the World' and 'Father of Research' by the European Heart Journal in 2013. Mayo Clinic's all-time top fifty practitioners list includes Rahimtoola.

== Awards ==
Rahimtoola has been at the forefront of numerous awards and citations principally from his research and teaching career.

From the National AHA he has received Citations for International Service and Outstanding Service. From the AHA Oregon Affiliate he was awarded 'Salute to Research' in 1985. And from the AHA Los Angeles Affiliate the Award of Merit and Special Recognition for Outstanding Contributions to the study and practice of Cardiology.

From the FDA he received the Harvey W. Wiley Medal.

In teaching, Rahimtoola was recipient of the William Osler Award from the University of Miami. He received the Gifted Teacher Award from the American College of Cardiology in 1986. In 1989 Rahimtoola was the recipient of the James B. Herrick Award from the American Heart Association. In 1996 he was awarded the Melvin L. Marcus Memorial Award from the International Society of Heart Failure.

From the Mayo Foundation he received the Distinguished Alumnus Award in 1998. He was conferred the Master of the college from the American College of Cardiology in 1999. The ACC further conferred on him the Distinguished Scientist Award in 2001.

In 2000 Rahimtoola was conferred the Special Recognition Award from Hamdan Medical Award in the Middle East.

In 2002 Rahimtoola was awarded the D.Sc. (Hon) by the University of Karachi in a ceremony held at the Governor House [Sindh].

In 2009 the European society of Cardiology awarded him the gold medal for his outstanding contribution to the development of Cardiology.

This was followed by the ACC [American College of Cardiology] honoring Lifetime Achievement status to Shahbudin in 2013.

In 2016 Rahimtoola was conferred the 'Distinguished Fellowship' Award at the World Congress of International Academy of Cardiology in Boston.

== Publications ==
Rahimtoola has been author of some prominent textbooks used in postgraduate study of Cardiovascular Medicine namely Coronary Bypass Surgery (1977), Infective Endocaritis (1978), Controversies in Coronary Heart Disease (1982) and Valvular Heart Disease (1997).

He has also been co-author of Shock in Mycardial Infarction (1974), Acute Myocardial Infarction, 1st and 2nd editions (1991, 1997), Techniques and Applications of Interventional Cardiology (1991), Heart Failure (1995) and New Ischemic Syndromes (1997).

== Marriage ==
Rahimtoola married Shameem Virji in 1968.

== Family ==
Rahimtoola's father Hoosenally Rahimtoola was a noted Legislator of the Bombay Presidency who remained Mayor of Bombay during British rule in India.

His brother, Professor Shamsuddin Rahimtoola remained a prominent Physician based out of Karachi. He remained Principal of the Dow Medical College and Medical Superintendent of the Civil Hospital there.

== Death ==
Rahimtoola died on 9 December 2018 aged 87 at his residence in Palos Verdes Estates, California.
