= Mahadev Bhaskar Chaubal =

Sir Mahadev Bhaskar Chaubal K.C.I.E., C.S.I., B.A., LL.B. was an Acting Chief Justice of the Bombay High Court during the British Raj.

In 1910, Chaubal was appointed as a member of the Executive Council of the Governor of Bombay from which he resigned in 1912. He also served as a member of the Royal Commission on Public Services in India, along with Gopal Krishna Gokhale.
