= Jaffer Rahimtoola =

British Indian barrister

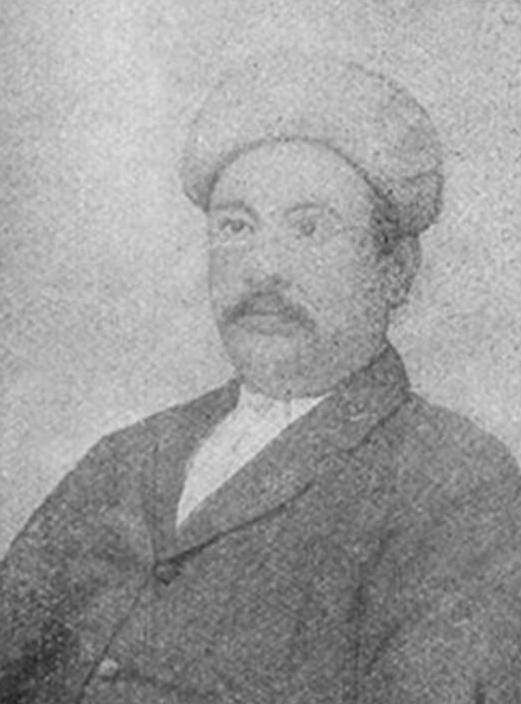
- Born: 1870; Bombay, Bombay Presidency, British India
- Died: 1914 (aged 43–44); Bombay, Bombay Presidency, British India
- Education: Bachelor of Arts, Bar at Law
- Occupations: Barrister, Legislator
- Known for: Mayor of Bombay 1909–10
- Relatives: Ibrahim Rahimtoola (brother)

Jaffer Rahimtoola (1870–1914) was a Barrister belonging to the Bombay Presidency. He served as Mayor of Bombay between 1909 and 1910. Rahimtoola was also author of 'History of the Khojas' published in Gujrati during 1905.

== Early life and education ==
Jaffer Rahimtoola was born in 1870 to a merchant trading family of Bombay who had origins from Kutch [India]. The early death of his father Rahimtoola Kaderbhoy persuaded his elder brothers Mohammadbhoy Rahimtoola and Ibrahim Rahimtoola to push him towards gaining adequate education.

Rahimtoola completed his matriculation in 1888 after which he joined the Bombay University to study Philosophy and Logic - Bachelor of Arts [Hon.]. In 1894 he proceeded to London and entered Lincoln's Inn to study law. His research dissertation work was revolved around Inheritance Laws of the Ismailis on which he spent around 30 months. He was inspired during this time to publish a book with specific reference to Khoja Laws and History.

== Career ==
In 1897, on his return to Bombay, he joined the Bombay High Court. He worked regularly as a barrister till his death. One of the prime cases he was involved in was Haji Bibi versus His Highness the Aga Khan III [Bombay High Court] where he was one of the panel and the only local (Indian) counsel to Sultan Mohammad Shah Aga Khan III.

Jaffer Rahimtoola joined the Municipal Corporation for the Mandvi Ward in 1898, thus entering his career in politics. Rahimtoola merited the title Justice of Peace [J.P.] in 1901. He remained associated with the Corporation actively serving on various committees including being General Secretary once. He eventually became the corporation's President [the post was renamed later as Mayor] in 1909.

Jaffer Rahimtoola was also fellow of the Bombay University – a position he held till his death. At the fourth Indian Industrial Conference held at Madras during 1908 Jaffer Rahimtoola was present in representation of the Anjuman-e-Islam Bombay along with Abbas Tyabhi, Mohamed Ali Jinnah, Kazi Kabiruddin and Yusuf Ismail.

During King George V visit to India [1911] he was part of the Municipal Government Team to represent Bombay at the Apollo Bandar.

== Accolade ==
The Bombay Municipality in 1921 commissioned the Jaffer Rahimtoola School building in Ward 'B' of the metropolis. This was in honor of their former Mayor and Councillor.

The Schools were expanded twice - once in 1968 and a Secondary school was established in 2007.

Jaffer Rahimtoola was noted as a Prominent Khoja Community Icon for the period of late nineteenth and early twentieth century.

== Family ==
Jaffer Rahimtoola's brother Ibrahim Rahimtoola was noted Politician and Reformer of British India. He remained Mayor of Bombay between 1899-1900 and later served as President of the Central Legislative Assembly between 1931 and 1933.

His son, Hoosenally Rahimtoola was a key Legislator of the Bombay Presidency. Hoosenally served as Mayor of Bombay between 1934–35 and later became President of the Legislative Council during 1936.

== Literary Front ==
Jaffer was gifted with exceptional literary talent. He was well versed in four languages namely Persian, Gujrati, Hindi, English. In 1904 he became Fellow of the Bombay University. He also served as member of the Standing Committee during the same period. He published his book History of the Khojas in Gujrati on 30 September 1905. The publication was divided into 30 small chapters and spread over 287 pages. The book was dedicated in the name of Sultan Mohammad Shah [Aga Khan III] after getting due gracious permission. The book has been referenced in several research papers, articles, books till date as the first authentic paperback work on Khoja Community and its workings.

This book was followed up by Hashim Bogla's 'Asaliyate Khoja' (Bombay, 1912) and Ebrahim Varteji's 'Aftabe hakikat' (Bombay, 1916) and 'Vedik Islam' (Bombay, 1921). All of these publications were significant works of the time.

== Social Welfare ==
On the social welfare front The Hon. Mr. Rahimtoola served as an auditor for the Anjuman-e-Islam [Bombay] for four years followed by which he became its honorary secretary. He eventually became President of the Trust in 1910. He also served as member Managing Committee of the Khoja Punjibhai Club and eventually became its chairman.

== Death ==
Jaffer Rahimtoola died on 1914 in Bombay.
