= Hoosenally Rahimtoola =

Mayor of Bombay from 1934 to 1935

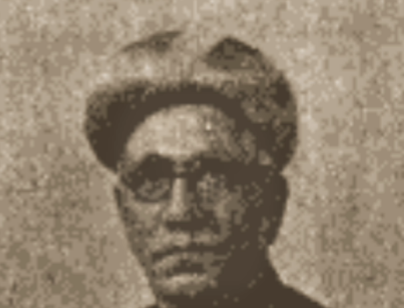
- Born: May 1890; Bombay, Bombay Presidency, British India
- Died: January 1977 (aged 86); Karachi, Sindh, Pakistan
- Education: Bachelor of Arts
- Occupations: Legislator, Councillor
- Known for: Mayor of Bombay 1934–35
- Parent: Jaffer Rahimtoola (Father)

Hoosenally Rahimtoola was a legislator of the Bombay Presidency. He remained Mayor of Bombay from 1934 to 1935 and was minister in the provincial government briefly in 1937. Rahimtoola was also president of the Bombay Legislative Council during 1936.

== Early life and education ==
Hoosenally M. Rahimtoola was born in May 1890 to a merchant trading family who were well established politically in Bombay. Being the first male grandchild in the family, he was brought up by his elder uncle Mohammadbhoy Rahimtoola.

Hoosenally achieved his secondary education from St. Xavier's High School, Bombay. He took his degree of Bachelor of Arts from Bombay University 1911.

== Career ==
He then joined business with family and remained active till partition of the sub-continent. One of the major industries that Hoosenally was involved in Cotton Mills. He also remained a partner and director in over a dozen public and private listed companies and made his name in the business world.

On the political front Rahimtoola was elected to the Municipal Corporation in 1918 where he remained active for many years in different capacities including being Councillor.

By 1920 Hoosenally had become a member of the Bombay Legislative Council, of which he remained a permanent part till the late 1930s. His work on housing, local self-government, civic works remained a key part of his struggle and dedication. He served on several committees chief among them Sea Encroachments [1925], Black Bay Layout [1927], King George V Memorial Fund [1936–37] etc.

Hoosenally's association with the Bombay Improvements Trust instilled some important works of the time. He was chairman standing committee in 1927–28 followed by chairman improvements committee 1928–29.

In 1927 he was part of a board set up under the then Commissioner of Police Bombay Mr. D. Healy to look into sorting and regularizing the Hajj process for Muslims in British India. The First India Hajj Committee met in April of that year in Bombay and this was to become the initiation point of the modern national Hajj Committee's across 21st century India.

During New Years dates of 1928–29 Hoosenally was representative of Bombay Presidency at the All India Muslim Conference held at Delhi. This conference was held under the presidency of His Highness the Aga Khan and had representation from all localities of India.

By 1931 Hoosenally was appointed trustee of the Bombay Port Trust. He was representative of the Mill Owners Association and the Municipal Corporation simultaneously. He retained this position till end of that particular decade.

On the literary front Hoosenally Rahimtoola co-edited a book with Clifford Manshaw titled Bombay Municipality at Work in 1935.

During April 1934 Hoosenally Rahimtoola was elected Mayor of Bombay. He served the corporation as mayor for one year. The elevation to mayoralty marked a key phase of his municipal career with which he was associated for a long time.

During 1935 Hoosenally Rahimtoola was part of the Provincial Delimitation committee set up by the Government to establish operational and financial procedures for provincial autonomy including separation of Sindh as a separate entity.

By 1936 Rahimtoola reached the zenith of his work with the legislative council as well. He was elected president of the council – a term which he served for nearly a year till early 1937. This period also marked the completion of three decades of association for him with the provincial Legislature.

The provincial elections of 1937 provided an altogether different platform for Hoosenally to continue legislative work. He was inducted as minister local self government for a brief period in the 'Cooper Cabinet' formed in Bombay under the governorship of Lord Brabourne.

Indias Who's Who List of 1937–38 included Hoosenally Rahimtoola for his successive posting at important posts both politically and in trade.

== Family ==
Hoosenally's father, Jaffer Rahimtoola was a noted barrister of the Bombay Presidency. He remained Mayor of Bombay between 1909–10 and was author of book 'History of the Khojas' published in 1905.

His son Shahbudin Rahimtoola was a widely acclaimed cardiologist based out of California. He had been responsible for his contribution to two clinical syndromes namely the hibernating myocardium and 'prosthetic valve-mismatch'.

His younger son Shamsuddin Rahimtoola was a prominent physician based out of Karachi. He remained principal of the Dow Medical College and medical superintendent of the Civil Hospital, both based in the city.

== Social welfare ==
On the social welfare front his activities embraced vast field viz. student activities, community work and memorials to stalwarts such as Shri Lalji Naranji, P.B.Dinshaw and D.E.Vacha. Making services to the Khoja Community a starting point he gradually enlarged its orbit.

He remained honorary auditor of the Islam Gymkhana from 1916 till 1926 and Member Gokhuldas Tejpal Hospital between 1924 till 1929. He was also Member of the Bombay Branch of the Indian Red Cross since 1924 and the Bombay Vigilance Association.

== Accolades ==
Hoosenally Rahimtoola's work in the field of education and social welfare was described as 'monumental' both as councillor to the corporation and legislator to the legislative council.

The State Gazetteer of Maharashtra described Hoosenally Rahimtoola as one of the 'glittering galaxy of powerful personalities’who had occupied the prestigious Mayoral office of Bombay alongside Sir Pherozeshah Mehta, Vithalbhai Patel, K.F. Nariman, J.M. Mehta and Sir Homi Mody. who had occupied the prestigious mayoral office of Bombay alongside Sir Pherozeshah Mehta, Vithalbhai Patel, K.F. Nariman, J.M. Mehta and Sir Homi Mody.

Hoosenally Rahimtoola was noted as a Khoja Community Icon for the period of first half of the twentieth century.

== Literary front ==
On the literary front Hoosenally Rahimtoola co-edited a book with Clifford Manshart titled Bombay Municipality at Work in 1935. It was an archival of a symposium detailing the working of the corporation and its effectiveness.

== Death ==
Hoosenally Rahimtoola died in January 1977 aged 87 whilst residing in Karachi, Pakistan.
