= History of Pakistan =

Pre-independence history of Pakistan

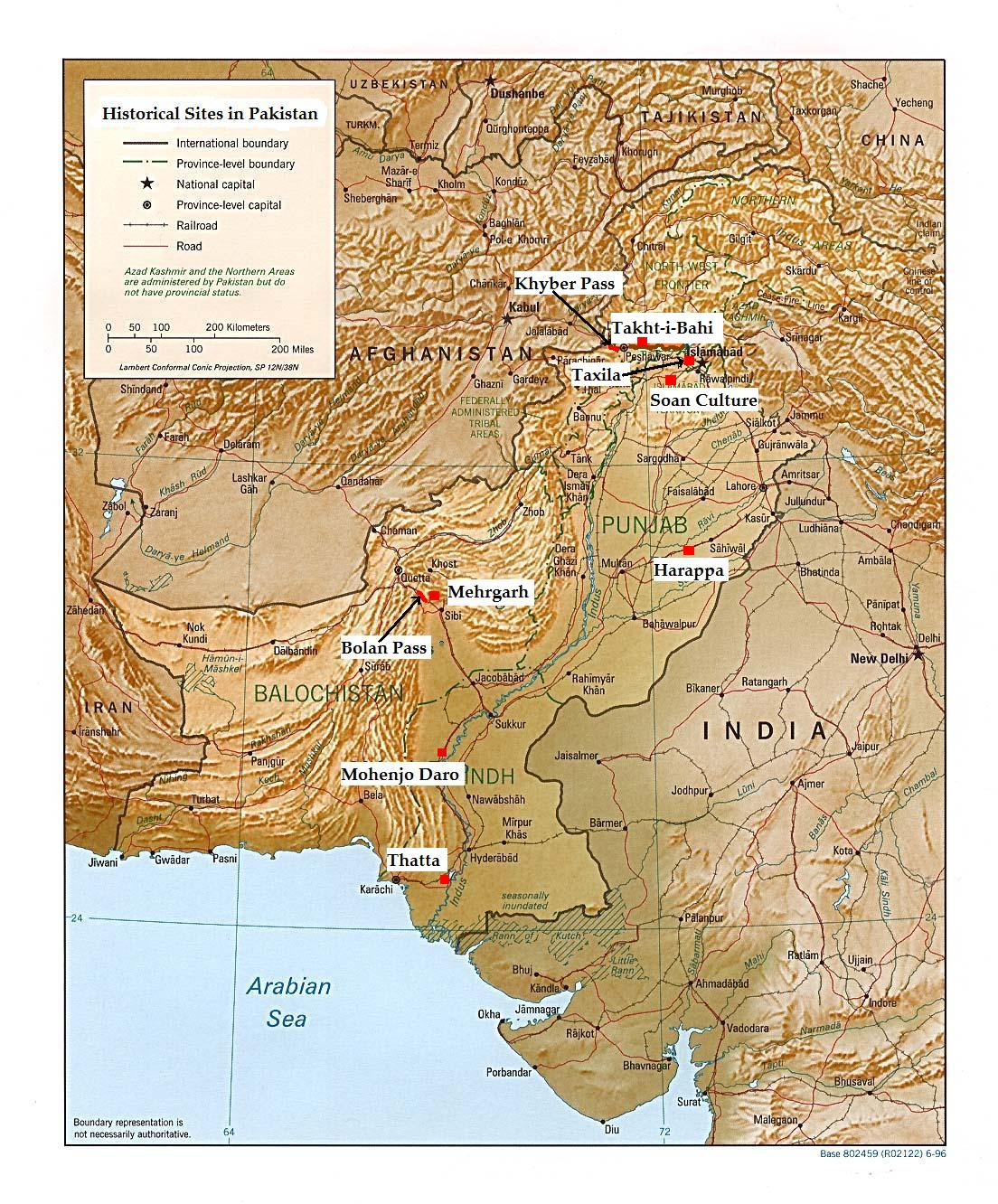
A map outlining historical sites in Pakistan.

The history of Pakistan preceding the country's independence in 1947 is shared with that of neighbouring Afghanistan, India, Iran and Tibet. Spanning the western expanse of the Indian subcontinent and the eastern borderlands of the Iranian plateau, the region of contemporary Pakistan served both as the fertile ground of a major civilization and as the gateway of South Asia to Central Asia and the Near East.

Situated on the first coastal migration route of Homo sapiens out of Africa, the region was inhabited early by modern humans. The 9,000-year history of village life in South Asia traces back to the Neolithic (7000–4300 BCE) site of Mehrgarh in Pakistan, and the 5,000-year history of urban life in South Asia to the various sites of the Indus Valley Civilisation, including Mohenjo-daro and Harappa.

The ensuing millennia saw the region of present-day Pakistan absorb diverse influences. Several ancient empires left their mark in the region, such as the Achaemenid, the Maurya, the Indo-Greek, the Indo-Scythian, the Indo-Parthian, the Kushan, the Apracha and the Odi in Gandhara, the Huna and the Takka; as did, after the Islamic conquest, the Umayyad, the Ghaznavid, the Ghurid, the Delhi Sultanate, and the Mughal, before the modern period. During the medieval period, dynasties originating from the modern-day country ruled various areas in and around Pakistan, including the Patola, the Odi, the Soomra, the Samma, the Qambrani, the Langah, the Sayyid and the Lodi of Delhi Sultanate, the Gibari, the Shah Miri, the Maqpon, the Kalhora, the Talpur, the Gichki, the Sukerchakia, and the Daudpotra, among others.

Gradually, in the first half of the 19th century, the region came under suzerainty of the East India Company through conquests and subsidiary alliances. Company Raj was replaced by the direct crown rule, the British Raj, after 1858. In the early decades of the 20th-century, Muslim nationalism gained momentum in the predominantly Muslim population and intelligentsia, and the Pakistan Movement, led by Muhammad Ali Jinnah, ended with the partition of British holdings in 1947 and the establishment of the dominions of Pakistan and India. The heritage of the country is represented among others in the ancient, mainly Hindu-Buddhist, sites of Taxila, and Takht-i-Bahi, the 14th-century Islamic-Sindhi monuments of Thatta, and the 17th-century Mughal monuments of Lahore.

== Prehistory ==
=== Paleolithic period ===
The Soanian is an archaeological culture of the Lower Paleolithic, Acheulean. It is named after the Soan Valley in the Sivalik Hills, near modern-day Islamabad and is dated between c.774,000 and c.11,700 BCE.

=== Neolithic period ===
Mehrgarh is an important Neolithic site discovered in 1974, which shows early evidence of farming and herding, and dentistry. The site dates back to 7000–5500 BCE and is located on the Kachi Plain of Balochistan. The residents of Mehrgarh lived in mud brick houses, stored grain in granaries, fashioned tools from copper, cultivated barley, wheat, jujubes and dates, and herded sheep, goats and cattle. As the civilisation progressed (5500–2600 BCE) residents began to engage in crafts, including flint knapping, tanning, bead production, and metalworking. The site was occupied continuously until 2600 BCE, when climatic changes began to occur. Between 2600 and 2000 BCE, region became more arid and Mehrgarh was abandoned in favour of the Indus Valley, where a new civilisation was in the early stages of development.

== Bronze Age ==
=== Indus Valley Civilisation ===
Indus Valley Civilisation

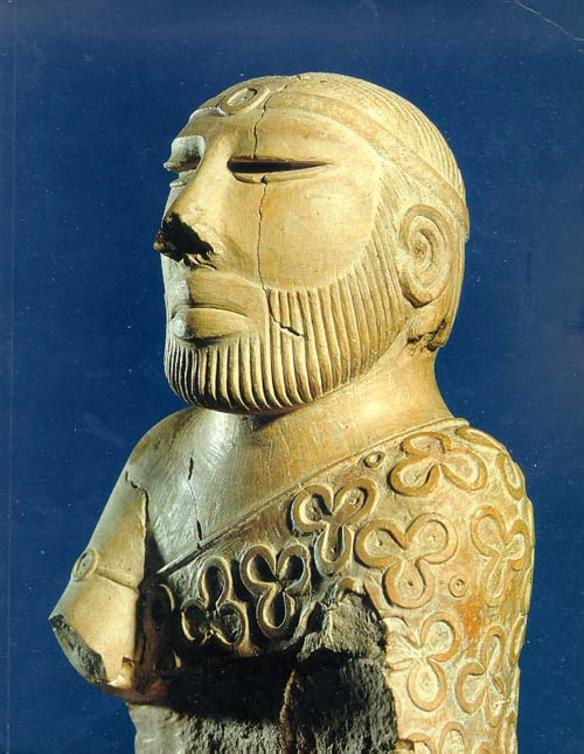
The "Priest King" sculpture is carved from steatite.

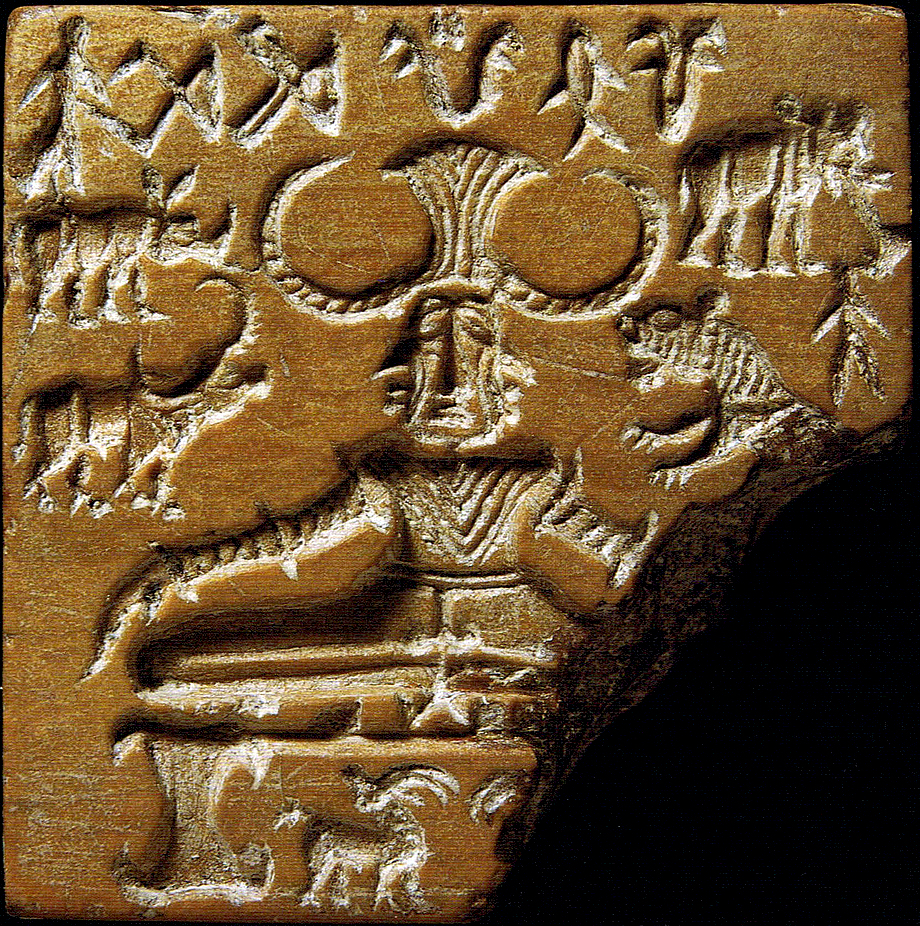
The Pashupati seal

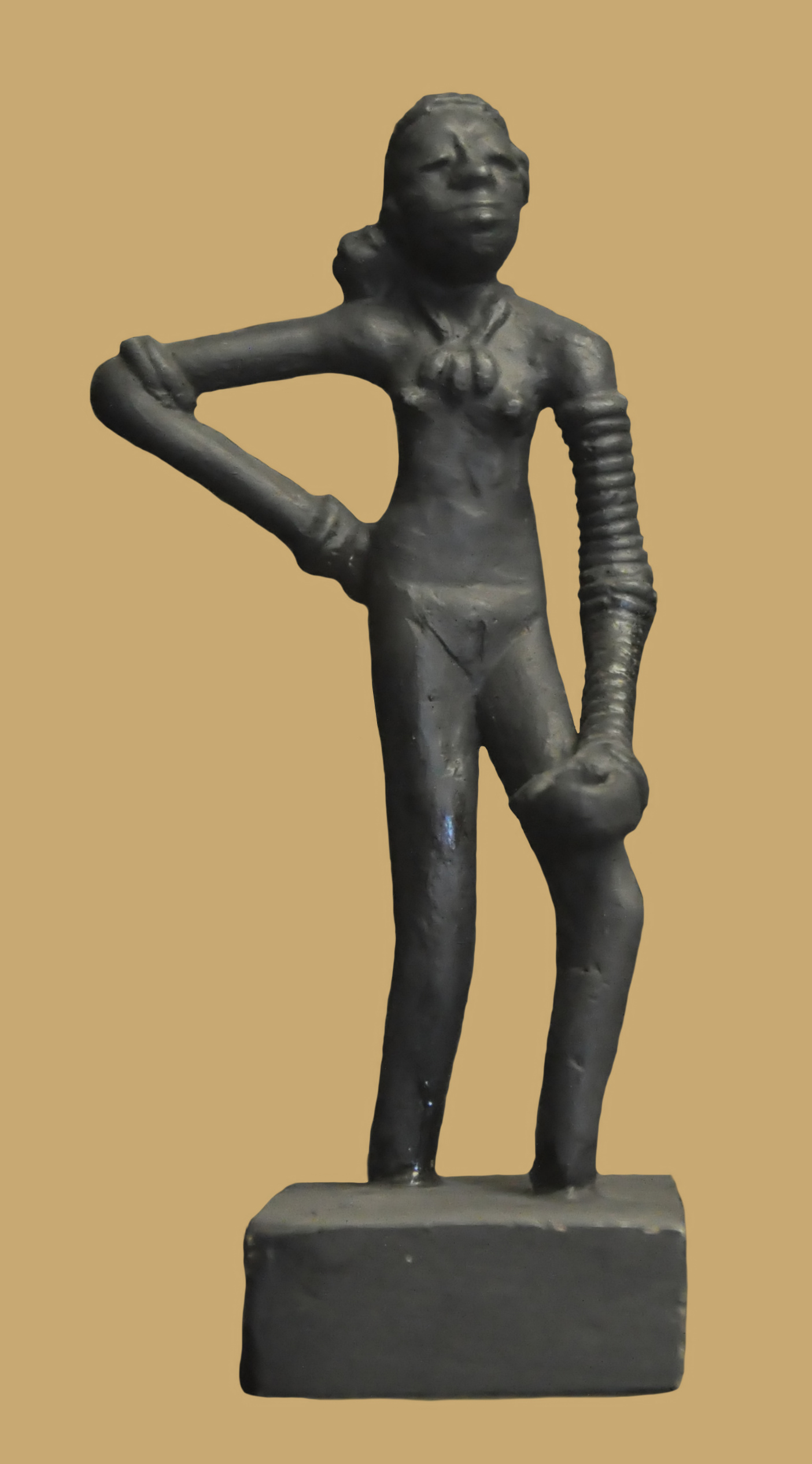
The Dancing Girl of Mohenjo-daro

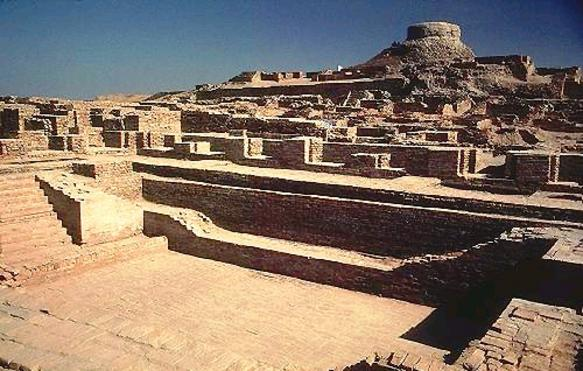
Excavated ruins of the Great Bath at Mohenjo-daro in Sindh

The Bronze Age in the Indus Valley began around 3300 BCE with the Indus Valley Civilization. Along with ancient Egypt and Mesopotamia, it was one of three early civilisations of the Old World, and of the three the most widespread, covering an area of 1.25 million km^{2}. It flourished in the basins of the Indus River, in what is today the Pakistani provinces of Sindh, Punjab and Balochistan, and along a system of perennial, mostly monsoon-fed, rivers that once coursed in the vicinity of the seasonal Ghaggar-Hakra River in parts of northwest India. At its peak, the civilisation hosted a population of approximately 5 million spread across hundreds of settlements extending as far as the Arabian Sea to present-day southern and eastern Afghanistan, and the Himalayas. Inhabitants of the ancient Indus river valley, the Harappans, developed new techniques in metallurgy and handicraft (carneol products, seal carving), and produced copper, bronze, lead, and tin.

The Mature Indus civilisation flourished from about 2600 to 1900 BCE, marking the beginning of urban civilisation in the Indus Valley. The civilisation included urban centres such as Harappa, Ganeriwala and Mohenjo-daro as well as an offshoot called the Kulli culture (2500–2000 BCE) in southern Balochistan and was noted for its cities built of brick, roadside drainage system, and multi-storeyed houses. It is thought to have had some kind of municipal organisation as well.

During the late period of this civilisation, signs of a gradual decline began to emerge, and by around 1700 BCE, most of the cities were abandoned. However, the Indus Valley Civilisation did not disappear suddenly, and some elements of the Indus Civilisation may have survived. Aridification of this region during the 3rd millennium BCE may have been the initial spur for the urbanisation associated with the civilisation, but eventually also reduced the water supply enough to cause the civilisation's demise, and to scatter its population eastward. The civilisation collapsed around 1700 BCE, though the reasons behind its fall are still unknown. Through the excavation of the Indus cities and analysis of town planning and seals, it has been inferred that the Civilization had high level of sophistication in its town planning, arts, crafts, and trade.

== Early history – Iron Age ==
=== Vedic period ===
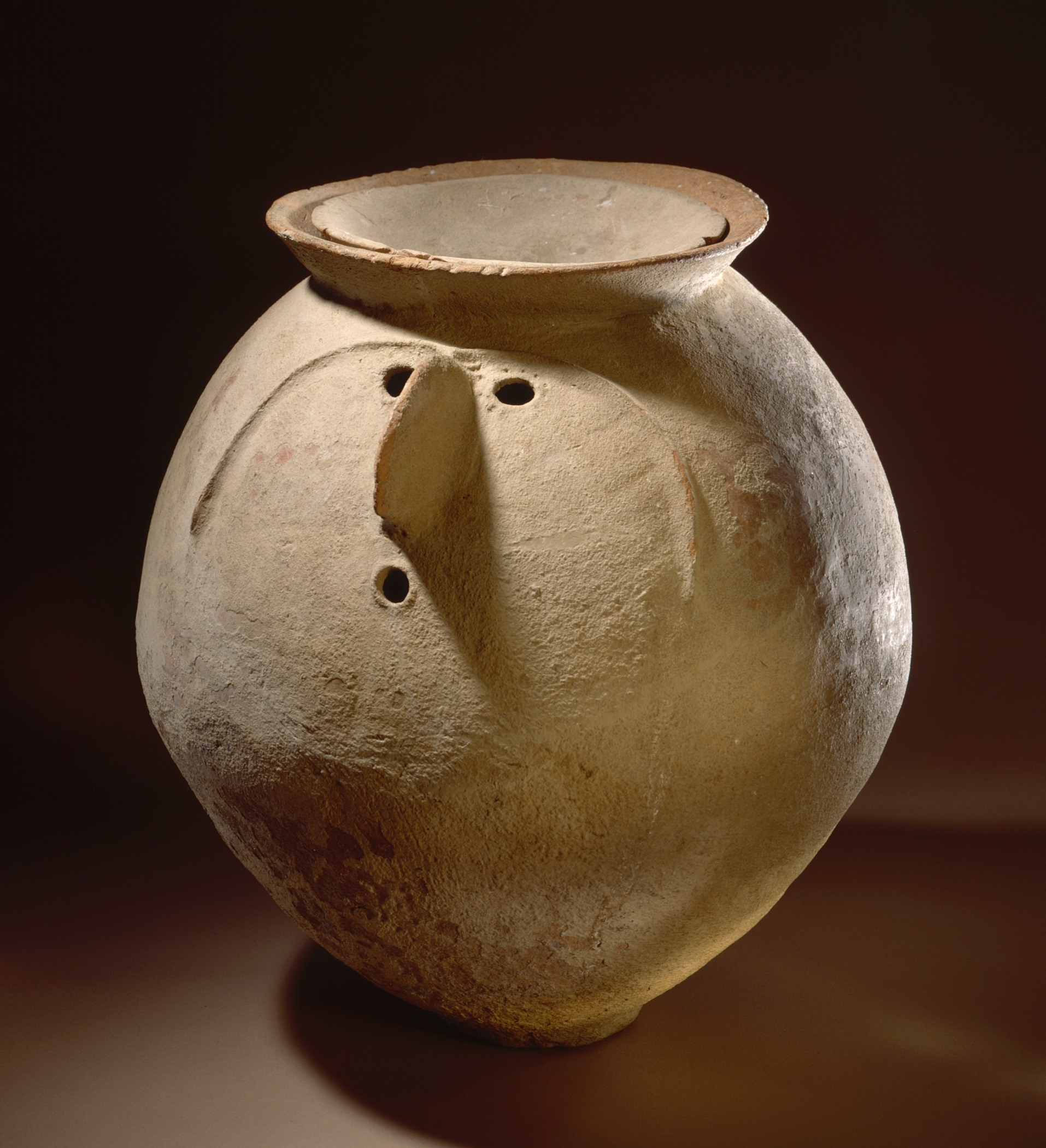
Cremation urn, Gandhara grave culture, Swat Valley, c. 1200 BCE

The Vedic Period (c. 1500 – c. 500 BCE) is postulated to have formed during the 1500 BCE to 800 BCE. As Indo-Aryans migrated and settled into the Indus Valley, along with them came their distinctive religious traditions and practices which fused with local culture. The Indo-Aryans religious beliefs and practices from the Bactria–Margiana Culture and the native Harappan Indus beliefs of the former Indus Valley Civilisation eventually gave rise to Vedic culture and tribes. (Note: Archaeological cultures identified with phases of Vedic culture include the Ochre Coloured Pottery culture, the Gandhara Grave culture, the Black and red ware culture and the Painted Grey Ware culture.) Early Indo-Aryans were a Late Bronze Age society centred in the Punjab, organised into tribes rather than kingdoms, and primarily sustained by a pastoral way of life. During this period the Vedas, the oldest scriptures of Hinduism, were composed. (Note: The precise time span of the period is uncertain. Philological and linguistic evidence indicates that the Rigveda, the oldest of the Vedas, was composed roughly between 1700 and 1100 BCE, also referred to as the early Vedic period.)

== Ancient history ==
=== Achaemenid Empire ===
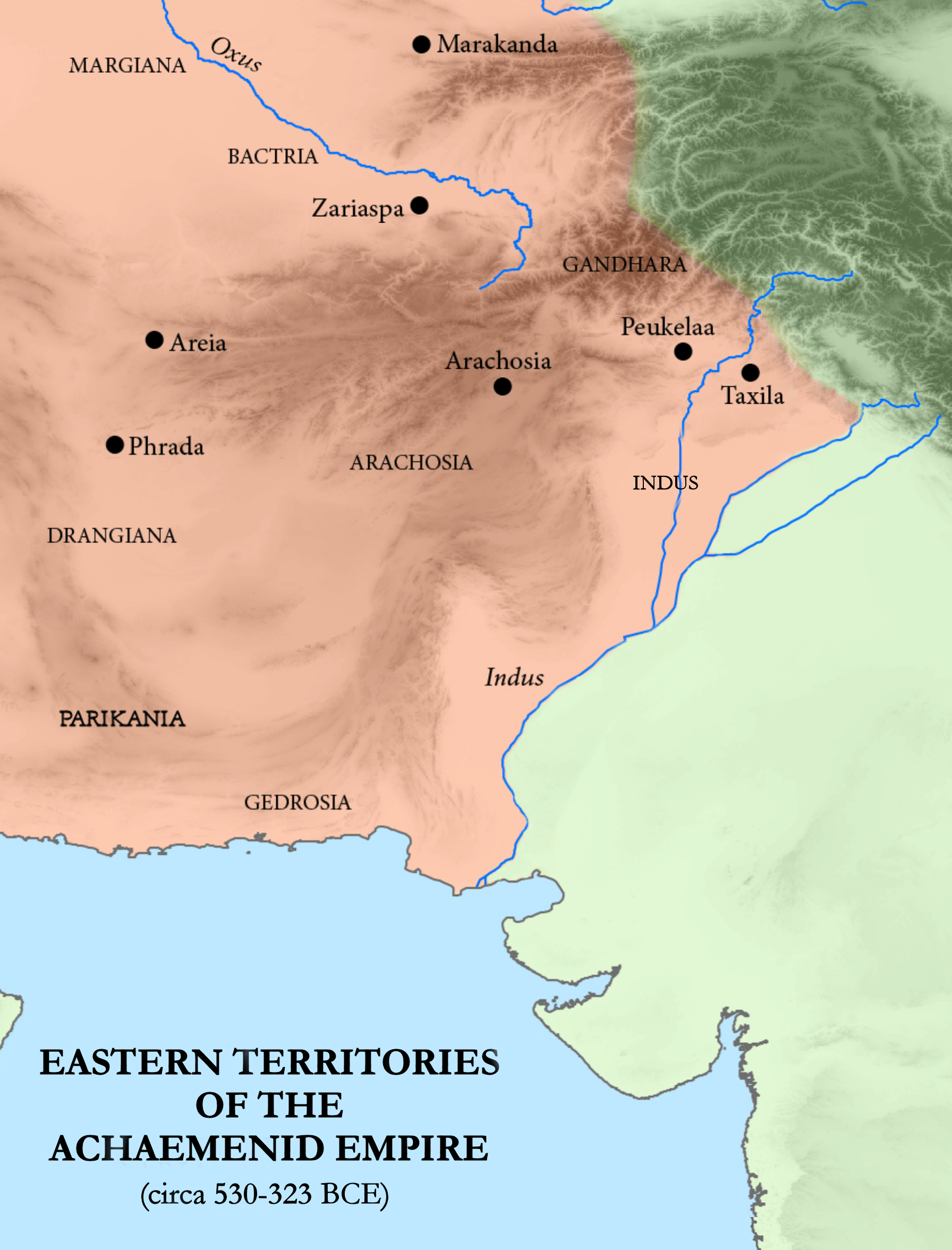
Much of the area corresponding to modern-day Pakistan was subordinated to the Achaemenid Empire and forced to pay tributes to Persia.

The main Vedic tribes remaining in the Indus Valley by 550 BCE were the Kamboja, Sindhu, Taksas of Gandhara, the Madras and Kathas of the River Chenab, Mallas of the River Ravi and Tugras of the River Sutlej. These several tribes and principalities fought against one another to such an extent that the Indus Valley no longer had one powerful Vedic tribal kingdom to defend against outsiders and to wield the warring tribes into one organised kingdom. King Pushkarasarin of Gandhara was engaged in power struggles against his local rivals and as such the Khyber Pass remained poorly defended. King Darius I of the Achaemenid Empire took advantage of the opportunity and planned for an invasion. The Indus Valley was fabled in Persia for its gold and fertile soil and conquering it had been a major objective of his predecessor Cyrus the Great. In 542 BCE, Cyrus had led his army and conquered the Makran coast in southern Balochistan. However, he is known to have campaigned beyond Makran (in the regions of Kalat, Khuzdar and Panjgur) and lost most of his army in the Gedrosian Desert (speculated today as the Kharan Desert).

In 518 BCE, Darius led his army through the Khyber Pass and southwards in stages, eventually reaching the Arabian Sea coast in Sindh by 516 BCE. Under Persian rule, a system of centralised administration, with a bureaucratic system, was introduced into the Indus Valley for the first time, establishing several satrapies: Gandāra around the general region of Gandhara, Hindush around Punjab and Sindh, Arachosia, encompassing parts of present-day Khyber Pakhtunkhwa, and Balochistan, Sattagydia around the Bannu basin, and Gedrosia covering much of the Makran region of southern Balochistan.

What is known about the easternmost satraps and borderlands of the Achaemenid Empire is alluded to in the Darius inscriptions and from Greek sources such as the Histories of Herodotus and the later Alexander Chronicles (Arrian, Strabo et al.). These sources list three Indus Valley tributaries or conquered territories that were subordinated to the Persian Empire and made to pay tributes to the Persian Kings.

=== Macedonian Empire ===
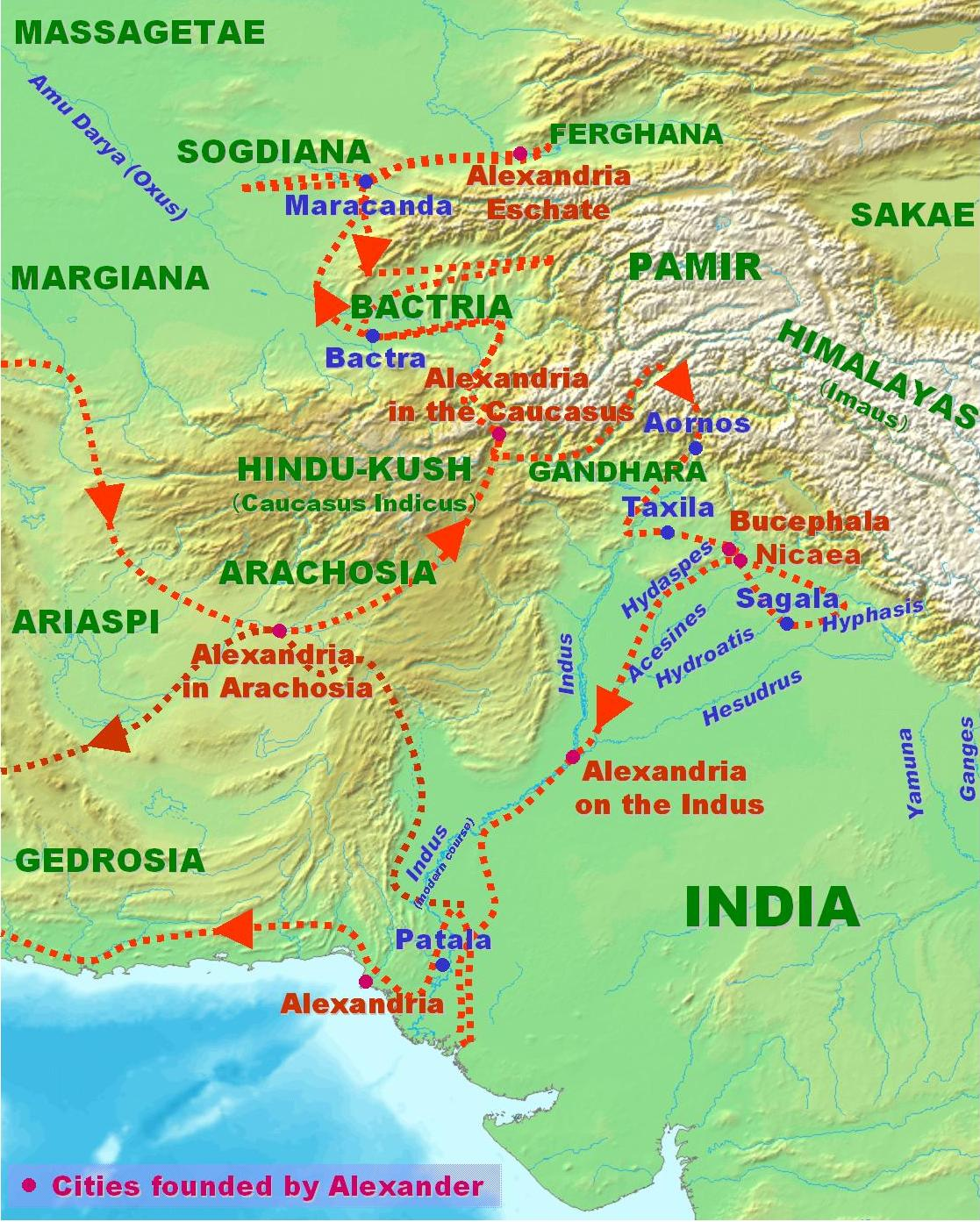
Alexander's campaigns in modern-day Pakistan

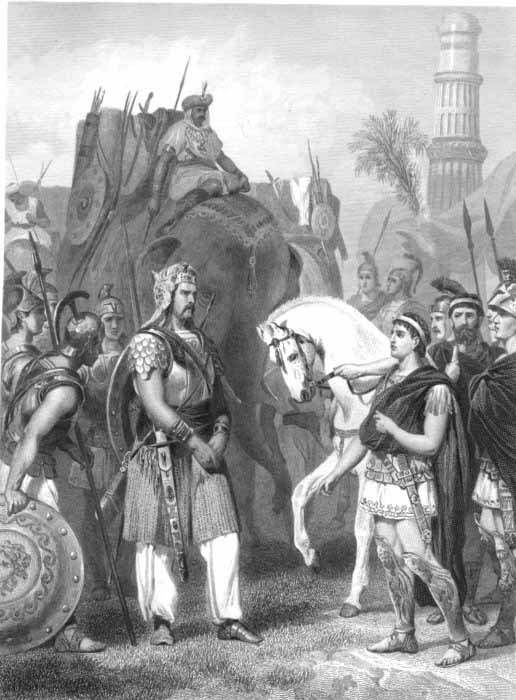
Porus, with Alexander the Great, 1895 painting by Alonzo Chappel

By spring of 326 BCE, Alexander began on his Indus expedition from Bactria, leaving behind 3500 horses and 10,000 soldiers. He divided his army into two groups. The larger force would enter the Indus Valley through the Khyber Pass, just as Darius had done 200 years earlier, while a smaller force under the personal command of Alexander entered through a northern route, possibly through Broghol or Dorah Pass near Chitral. Alexander was commanding a group of shield-bearing guards, foot-companions, archers, Agrianians, and horse-javelin-men and led them against the tribes of the former Gandhara satrapy.

The first tribe they encountered were the Aspasioi tribe of the Kunar Valley, who initiated a fierce battle against Alexander, in which he himself was wounded in the shoulder by a dart. However, the Aspasioi eventually lost and 40,000 people were enslaved. Alexander then continued in a southwestern direction where he encountered the Assakenoi tribe of the Swat and Buner valleys in April 326 BCE. The Assakenoi fought bravely and offered stubborn resistance to Alexander and his army in the cities of Ora, Bazira (Barikot) and Massaga. So enraged was Alexander about the resistance put up by the Assakenoi that he killed the entire population of Massaga and reduced its buildings to rubble – similar slaughters followed in Ora. A similar slaughter then followed at Ora, another stronghold of the Assakenoi. The stories of these slaughters reached numerous Assakenians, who began fleeing to Aornos, a hill-fort located between Shangla and Kohistan. Alexander followed close behind their heels and besieged the strategic hill-fort, eventually capturing and destroying the fort and killing everyone inside. The remaining smaller tribes either surrendered or like the Astanenoi tribe of Pushkalavati (Charsadda) were quickly neutralised where 38,000 soldiers and 230,000 oxen were captured by Alexander. Eventually Alexander's smaller force would meet with the larger force which had come through the Khyber Pass met at Attock. With the conquest of Gandhara complete, Alexander switched to strengthening his military supply line, which by now stretched dangerously vulnerable over the Hindu Kush back to Balkh in Bactria.

After conquering Gandhara and solidifying his supply line back to Bactria, Alexander combined his forces with the King Ambhi of Taxila and crossed the River Indus in July 326 BCE to begin the Archosia (Punjab) campaign. His first resistance would come at the River Jhelum near Bhera against King Porus of the Paurava tribe. The famous Battle of the Hydaspes (Jhelum) between Alexander (with Ambhi) and Porus would be the last major battle fought by him. After defeating Porus, his battle weary troops refused to advance into India to engage the army of Nanda Dynasty and its vanguard of trampling elephants. Alexander, therefore proceeded south-west along the Indus Valley. Along the way, he engaged in several battles with smaller kingdoms in Multan and Sindh, before marching his army westward across the Makran desert towards what is now Iran. In crossing the desert, Alexander's army took enormous casualties from hunger and thirst, but fought no human enemy. They encountered the "Fish Eaters", or Ichthyophagi, primitive people who lived on the Makran coast, who had matted hair, no fire, no metal, no clothes, lived in huts made of whale bones, and ate raw seafood.

=== Mauryan Empire ===
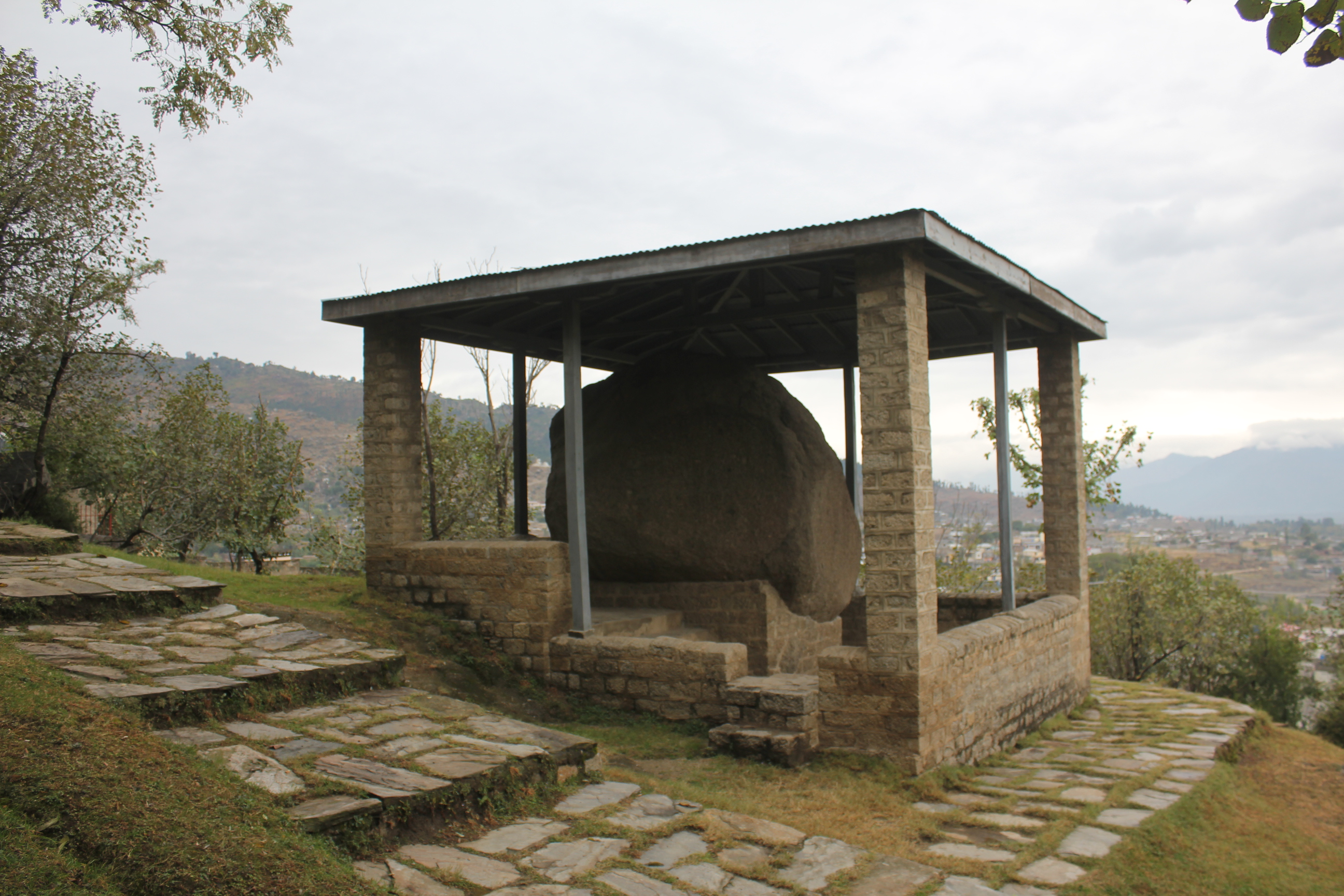
Mansehra Rock Edicts, one of the edicts of the Mauryan emperor Ashoka

The Maurya Empire was a geographically extensive Iron Age historical power in South Asia based in Magadha, having been founded by Chandragupta Maurya in 322 BCE, and existing in loose-knit fashion until 185 BCE. The Maurya Empire was centralised by the conquest of the Indo-Gangetic Plain, and its capital city was located at Pataliputra (modern Patna). Outside this imperial centre, the empire's geographical extent was dependent on the loyalty of military commanders who controlled the armed cities sprinkling it. During Ashoka's rule (ca. 268–232 BCE) the empire briefly controlled the major urban hubs and arteries of the Indian subcontinent excepting the deep south. It declined for about 50 years after Ashoka's rule, and dissolved in 185 BCE with the assassination of Brihadratha by Pushyamitra Shunga and foundation of the Shunga Empire in Magadha.

Through military conquests and diplomatic treaties, Chandragupta Maurya defeated the Nanda dynasty and extended his suzerainty as far westward as Afghanistan below the Hindu Kush and as far south as the northern Deccan.

Under the Mauryas, internal and external trade, agriculture, and economic activities thrived and expanded across South Asia due to the creation of a single and efficient system of finance, administration, and security. The Maurya dynasty built a precursor of the Grand Trunk Road from Patliputra to Taxila. After the Kalinga War, the Empire experienced nearly half a century of centralised rule under Ashoka. Ashoka's embrace of Buddhism and sponsorship of Buddhist missionaries allowed for the expansion of that faith into Sri Lanka, northwest India, and Central Asia.

The population of South Asia during the Mauryan period has been estimated to be between 15 and 30 million. The empire's period of dominion was marked by exceptional creativity in art, architecture, inscriptions and produced texts.

== Classical history ==
=== Indo-Greek Kingdom ===
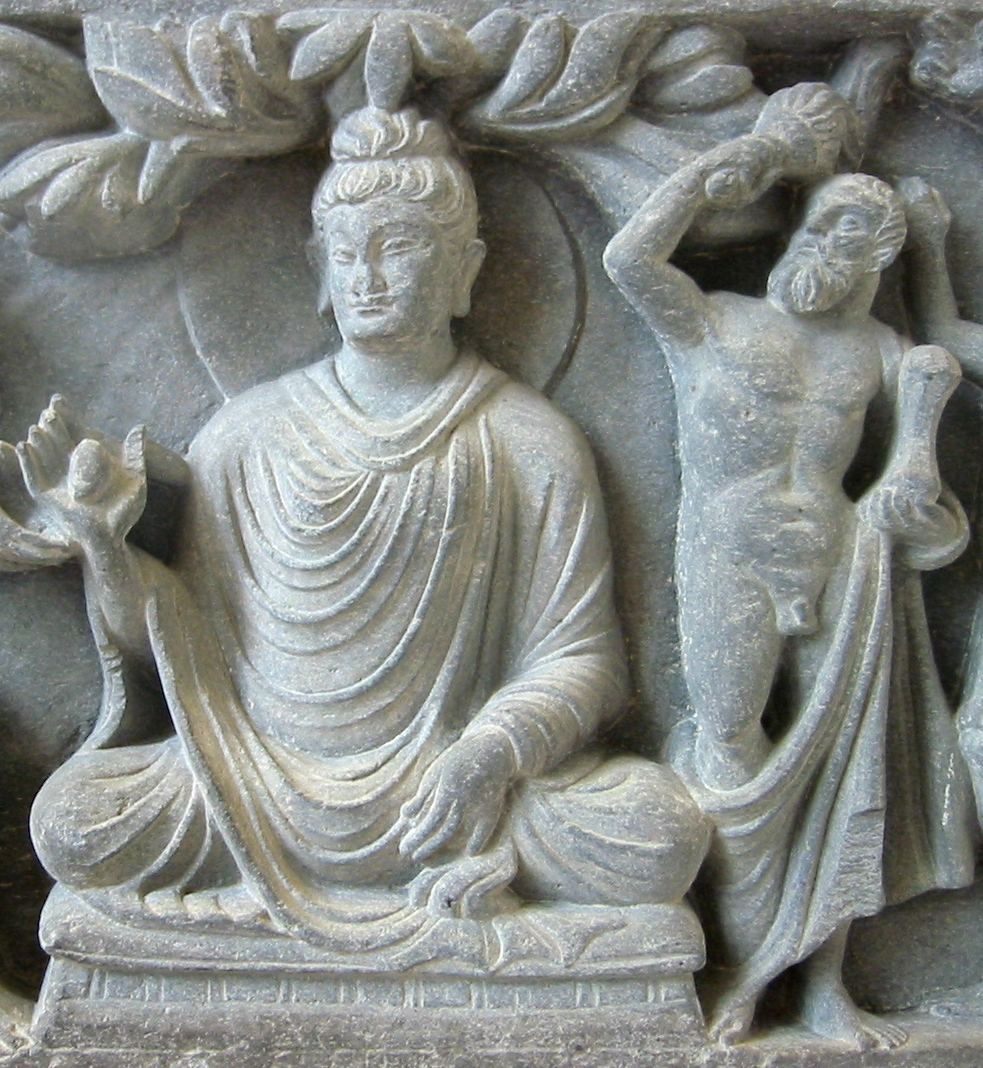
Greco-Buddhist representation of the Buddha, seated to the left of a depiction of Vajrapani in the guise of the Hellenic god Heracles

The Indo-Greek Menander I (reigned 155–130 BCE) drove the Greco-Bactrians out of Gandhara and beyond the Hindu Kush, becoming king shortly after his victory. His territories covered Panjshir and Kapisa in modern Afghanistan and extended to the Punjab region, with many tributaries to the south and east, possibly as far as Mathura. The capital Sagala (modern Sialkot) prospered greatly under Menander's rule and Menander is one of the few Bactrian kings mentioned by Greek authors.

The classical Buddhist text Milinda Pañha praises Menander, saying there was "none equal to Milinda in all India". His empire survived him in a fragmented manner until the last independent Greek king, Strato II, disappeared around 10 CE. Around 125 BCE, the Greco-Bactrian king Heliocles, son of Eucratides, fled from the Yuezhi invasion of Bactria and relocated to Gandhara, pushing the Indo-Greeks east of the Jhelum River. The last known Indo-Greek ruler was Theodamas, from the Bajaur area of Gandhara, mentioned on a 1st-century CE signet ring, bearing the Kharoṣṭhī inscription "Su Theodamasa" ("Su" was the Greek transliteration of the Kushan royal title "Shau" ("Shah" or "King")). Various petty kings ruled into the early 1st century CE, until the conquests by the Scythians, Parthians and the Yuezhi, who founded the Kushan dynasty.

It is during this period that the fusion of Hellenistic and Asiatic mythological, artistic and religious elements becomes most apparent, especially in the region of Gandhara, straddling western Pakistan and southern Afghanistan. Detailed, humanistic representations of the Buddha begin to emerge, depicting the figure with a close resemblance to the Hellenic god Apollo; Greek mythological motifs such as centaurs, Bacchanalian scenes, Nereids and deities such as Tyche and Heracles are prominent in the Buddhistic art of ancient Pakistan and Afghanistan.

=== Indo-Scythian Kingdom ===
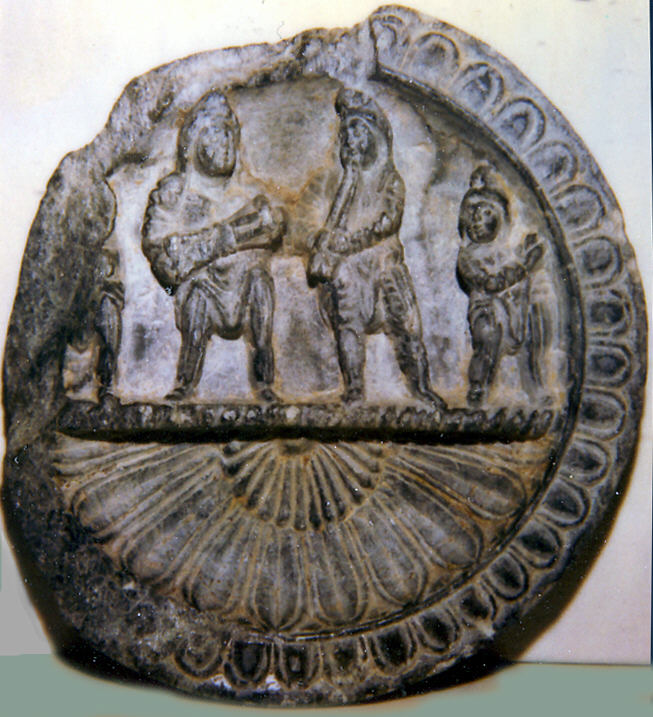
A stone palette of the type found in the Early Saka layer at Sirkap, Punjab

The Indo-Scythians were descended from the Sakas (Scythians) who migrated from southern Central Asia into modern Afghanistan, Pakistan and north India, as well as Arachosia to the west, from the middle of the 2nd century BCE to the 1st century BCE. They displaced the Indo-Greeks and ruled a kingdom that stretched from Gandhara to Mathura. The power of the Saka rulers started to decline in the 2nd century CE after the Scythians were defeated by the south Indian Emperor Gautamiputra Satakarni of the Satavahana dynasty. Later the Saka kingdom was completely destroyed by Chandragupta II of the Gupta Empire from eastern India in the 4th century.

=== Indo-Parthian Kingdom ===
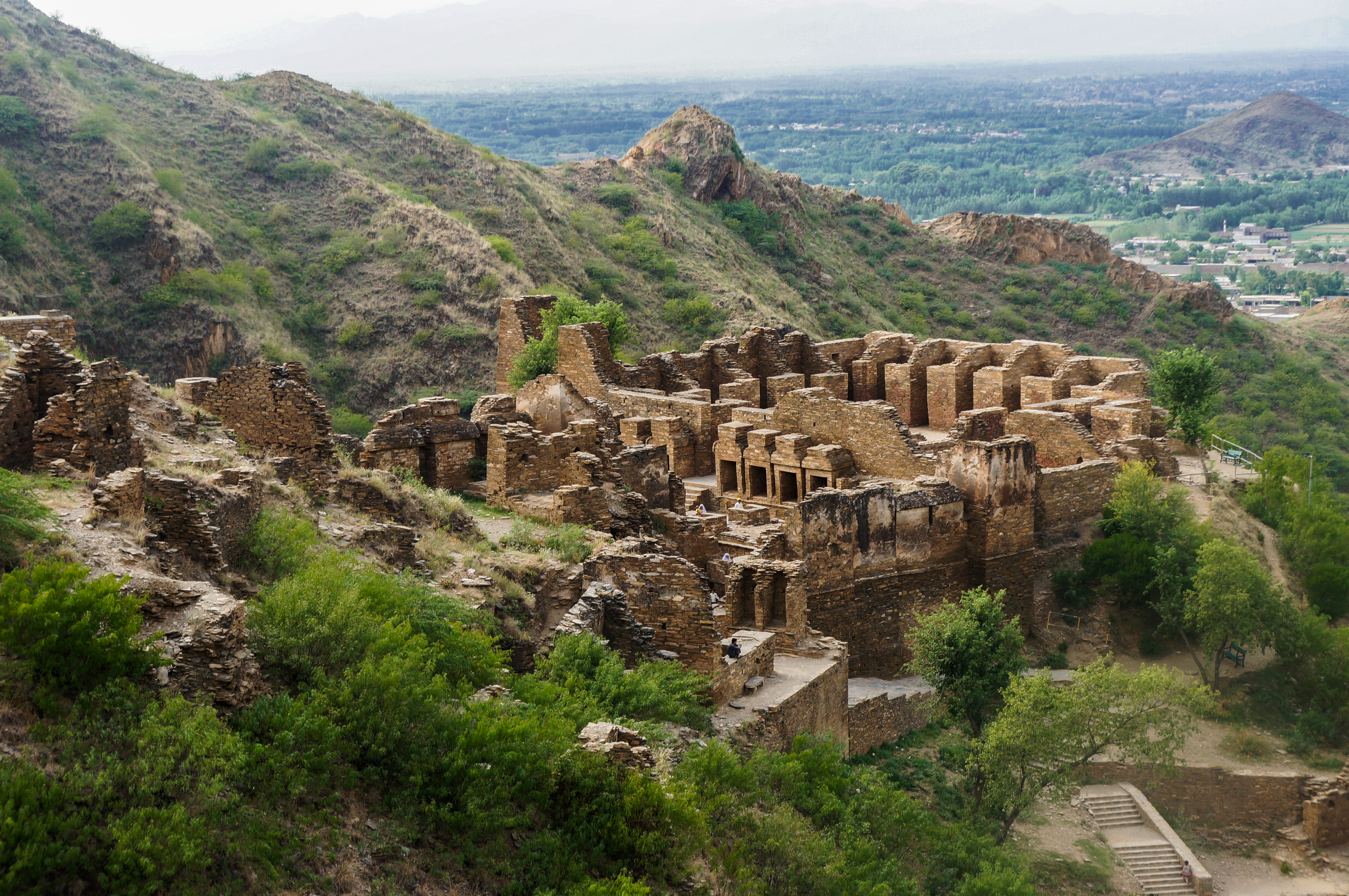
Ancient Buddhist monastery Takht-i-Bahi (a UNESCO World Heritage Site) constructed by the Indo-Parthians

The Indo-Parthian Kingdom was ruled by the Gondopharid dynasty, named after its eponymous first ruler Gondophares. They ruled parts of present-day Afghanistan, Pakistan, and northwestern India, during or slightly before the 1st century CE. For most of their history, the leading Gondopharid kings held Taxila (in the present Punjab province of Pakistan) as their residence, but during their last few years of existence the capital shifted between Kabul and Peshawar. These kings have traditionally been referred to as Indo-Parthians, as their coinage was often inspired by the Arsacid dynasty, but they probably belonged to a wider groups of Iranic tribes who lived east of Parthia proper, and there is no evidence that all the kings who assumed the title Gondophares, which means "Holder of Glory", were even related.

=== Kushan Empire ===
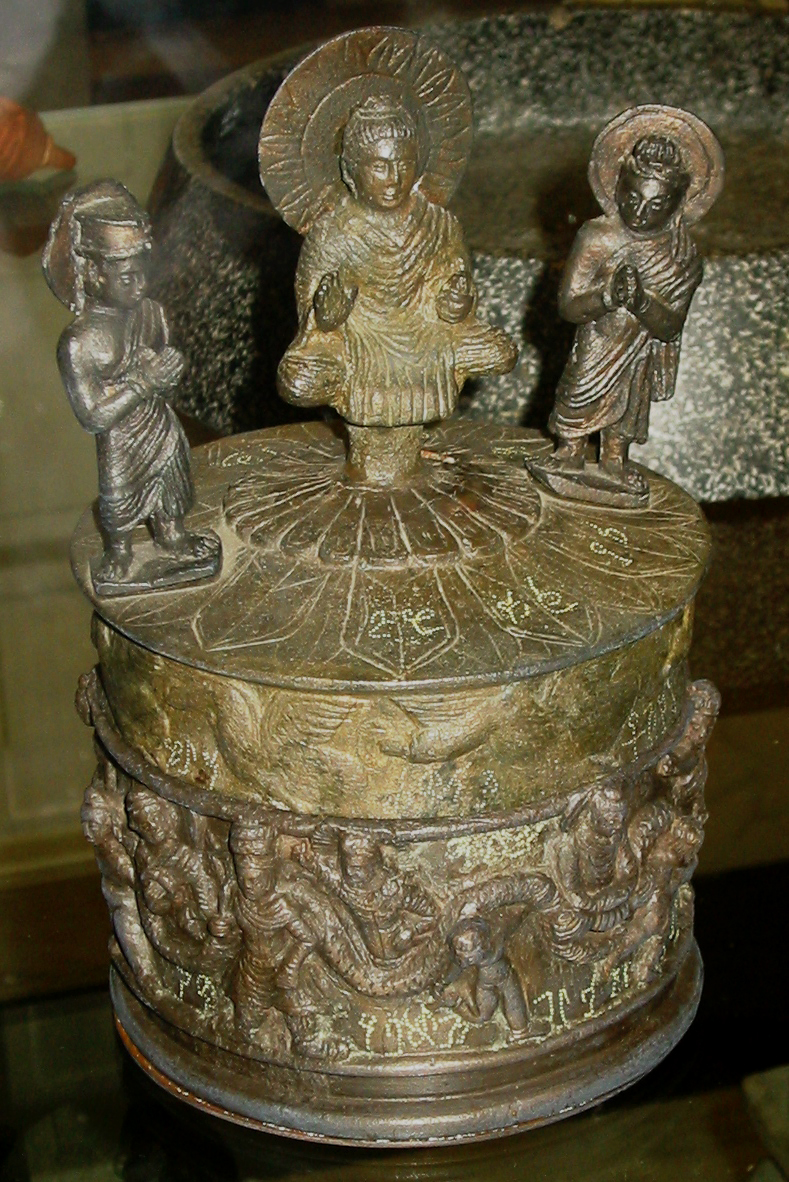
Peshawar's Kanishka stupa once kept sacred Buddhist relics in the Kanishka casket.

The Kushan Empire expanded out of what is now Afghanistan into the northwest of the subcontinent under the leadership of their first emperor, Kujula Kadphises, about the middle of the 1st century CE. They were descended from an Indo-European, Central Asian people called the Yuezhi, a branch of which was known as the Kushans. By the time of his grandson, Kanishka the Great, the empire spread to encompass much of Afghanistan and the northern parts of the Indian subcontinent at least as far as Saketa and Sarnath near Varanasi (Benares).

Emperor Kanishka was a great patron of Buddhism; however, as Kushans expanded southward, the deities of their later coinage came to reflect its new Hindu majority. The very large, now vanished, Kanishka stupa is believed to have been established by the king near the outskirts of modern-day Peshawar.

The Kushan dynasty played an important role in the establishment of Buddhism in India and its spread to Central Asia and China. Historian Vincent Smith said about Kanishka in particular:

He played the part of a second Ashoka in the history of Buddhism.

The empire linked the Indian Ocean maritime trade with the commerce of the Silk Road through the Indus valley, encouraging long-distance trade, particularly between China and Rome. The Kushans brought new trends to the budding and blossoming Gandharan art, which reached its peak during Kushan rule.

H.G. Rowlinson commented:

The Kushan period is a fitting prelude to the Age of the Guptas.

By the 3rd century, their empire in India was disintegrating and their last known great emperor was Vasudeva I.

=== Alchon Huns ===
The Alchon Empire was the third of four major Huna states established in Central and South Asia. The Alchon were preceded by the Kidarites and succeeded by the Hephthalites in Bactria and the Nezak Huns in the Hindu Kush. The names of the Alchon kings are known from their extensive coinage, Buddhist accounts, and a number of commemorative inscriptions throughout the Indian subcontinent. Toramana's son Mihirakula, a Saivite Hindu, moved up to near Pataliputra to the east and Gwalior to central India. Hiuen Tsiang narrates Mihirakula's merciless persecution of Buddhists and destruction of monasteries, though the description is disputed as far as the authenticity is concerned. The Alchons have long been considered as a part or a sub-division of the Hephthalites, or as their eastern branch, but now tend to be considered as a separate entity. The Huns were defeated by the alliance of Indian rulers, Maharaja (Great King) Yasodharman of Malwa and Gupta Emperor Narasimhagupta in the 6th century. Some of them were driven out of India and others were assimilated in the Indian society.

== Medieval period ==
=== Arab Caliphate ===
The expansion of the Arab Caliphates. Expansion under Muhammad, 622–632 Expansion during the Rashidun Caliphate, 632–661 Expansion during the Umayyad Caliphate, 661–750

After conquering the Middle East from the Byzantine Empire and the Sasanian Empire, the Rashidun Caliphate reached the coastal region of Makran in present-day Balochistan. In 643, the second caliph Umar (r. 634–644) ordered an invasion of Makran against the Rai dynasty. Following the Rashidun capture of Makran, Umar restricted the army to not pass beyond and consolidated his position in Makran. During the reign of the fourth caliph Ali (r. 656–661), the Rashidun army conquered the town of Kalat in the heart of Balochistan. During the reign of the sixth Umayyad caliph al-Walid I (r. 705–715), the Arab military general Muhammad ibn al-Qasim commanded the Umayyad incursion into Sindh. In 712, he defeated the army of the Hindu maharaja Dahir of Aror (r. 695–712) and established the caliphal province of Sind. The historic town of al-Mansura was administered as the capital of the province. Afterward, Ibn al-Qasim proceeded to conquer Multan, which subsequently became a prominent centre of Islamic culture and trading. In 747, the anti-Umayyad rebel Mansur ibn Jumhur al-Kalbi seized Sind and was defeated by Musa ibn Ka'b al-Tamimi of the succeeding Abbasid Caliphate. In the 9th-century, Abbasid authority gradually declined in Sind and Multan. The tenth Abbasid caliph al-Mutawakkil (r. 847–861) assigned the governorship of Sind to Umar ibn Abd al-Aziz al-Habbari, who founded the hereditary Habbarid dynasty and became the autonomous ruler of Sind in 854. Around the same time, the Banu Munnabih established the Emirate of Multan while Ma'danids reigned over Sultanate of Makran. There was gradual conversion to Islam in the south, especially amongst the native Hindu and Buddhist majority, but in areas north of Multan, Hindus and Buddhists remained numerous. By the end of the 10th century CE, the region was ruled by several Hindu kings.

=== Odi Shahis ===
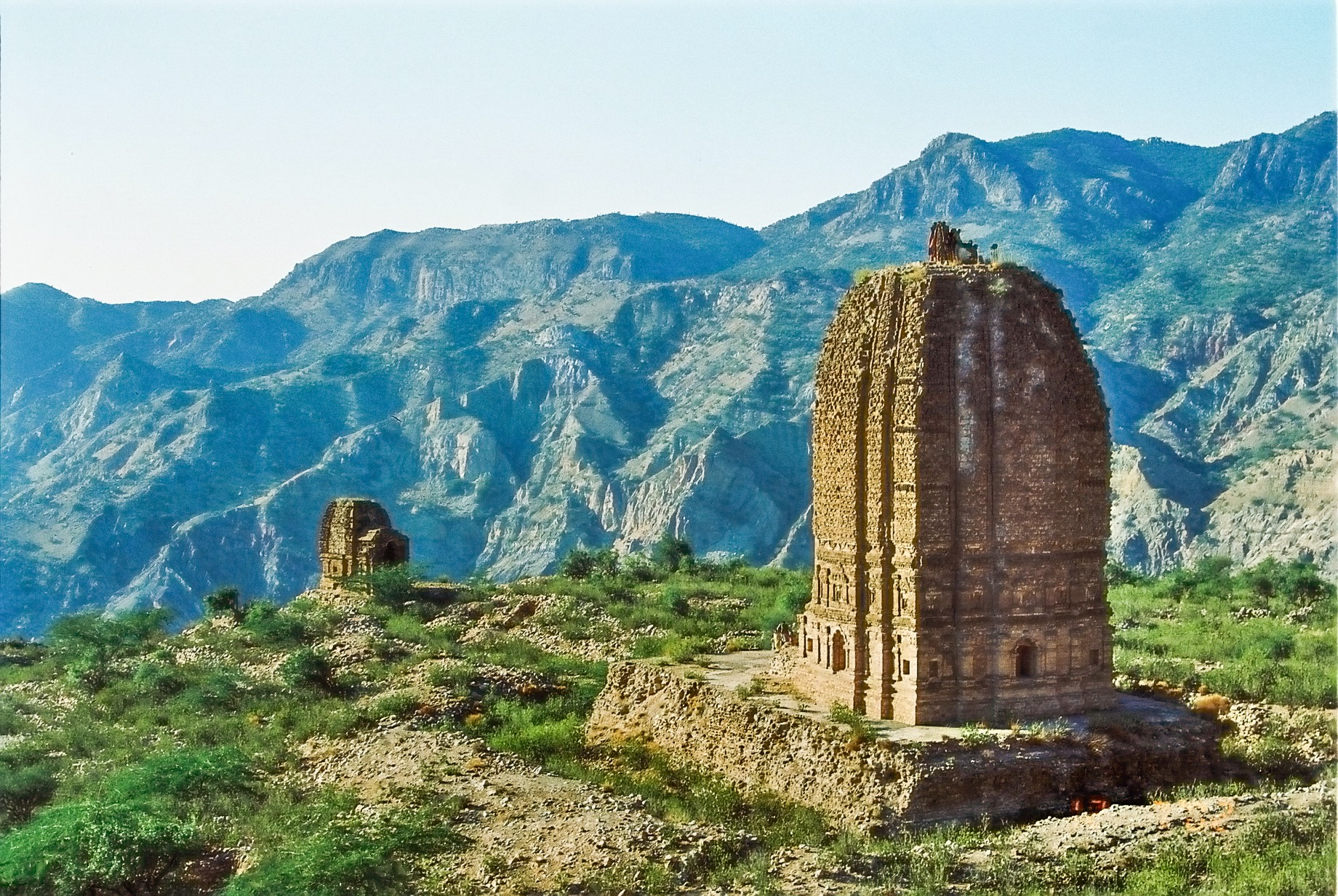
Amb Temples, built by the Hindu Shahi dynasty between the 7th and 9th centuries CE

The Turk Shahis ruled Gandhara from the decline of the Kushan Empire in the 3rd century until 870, when they were overthrown by the Hindu Shahis. The Hindu Shahis are believed to belong to the Uḍi/Oḍi tribe, namely the people of Oddiyana in Gandhara.

The first king Kallar had moved the capital into Udabandhapura from Kabul, in the modern village of Hund for its new capital. At its zenith, the kingdom stretched over the Kabul Valley, Gandhara and western Punjab under Jayapala. Jayapala saw a danger in the consolidation of the Ghaznavids and invaded their capital city of Ghazni both in the reign of Sebuktigin and in that of his son Mahmud, which initiated the Muslim Ghaznavid and Hindu Shahi struggles. Sebuk Tigin, however, defeated him, and he was forced to pay an indemnity. Jayapala defaulted on the payment and took to the battlefield once more. Jayapala however, lost control of the entire region between the Kabul Valley and Indus River.

However, the army was defeated in battle against the western forces, particularly against the Mahmud of Ghazni. In the year 1001, soon after Sultan Mahmud came to power and was occupied with the Qarakhanids north of the Hindu Kush, Jaipal attacked Ghazni once more and upon suffering yet another defeat by the powerful Ghaznavid forces, near present-day Peshawar. After the Battle of Peshawar, he died because of regretting as his subjects brought disaster and disgrace to the Shahi dynasty.

Jayapala was succeeded by his son Anandapala, who along with other succeeding generations of the Shahiya dynasty took part in various unsuccessful campaigns against the advancing Ghaznvids but were unsuccessful. The Hindu rulers eventually exiled themselves to the Kashmir Siwalik Hills.

=== Ghaznavid dynasty ===
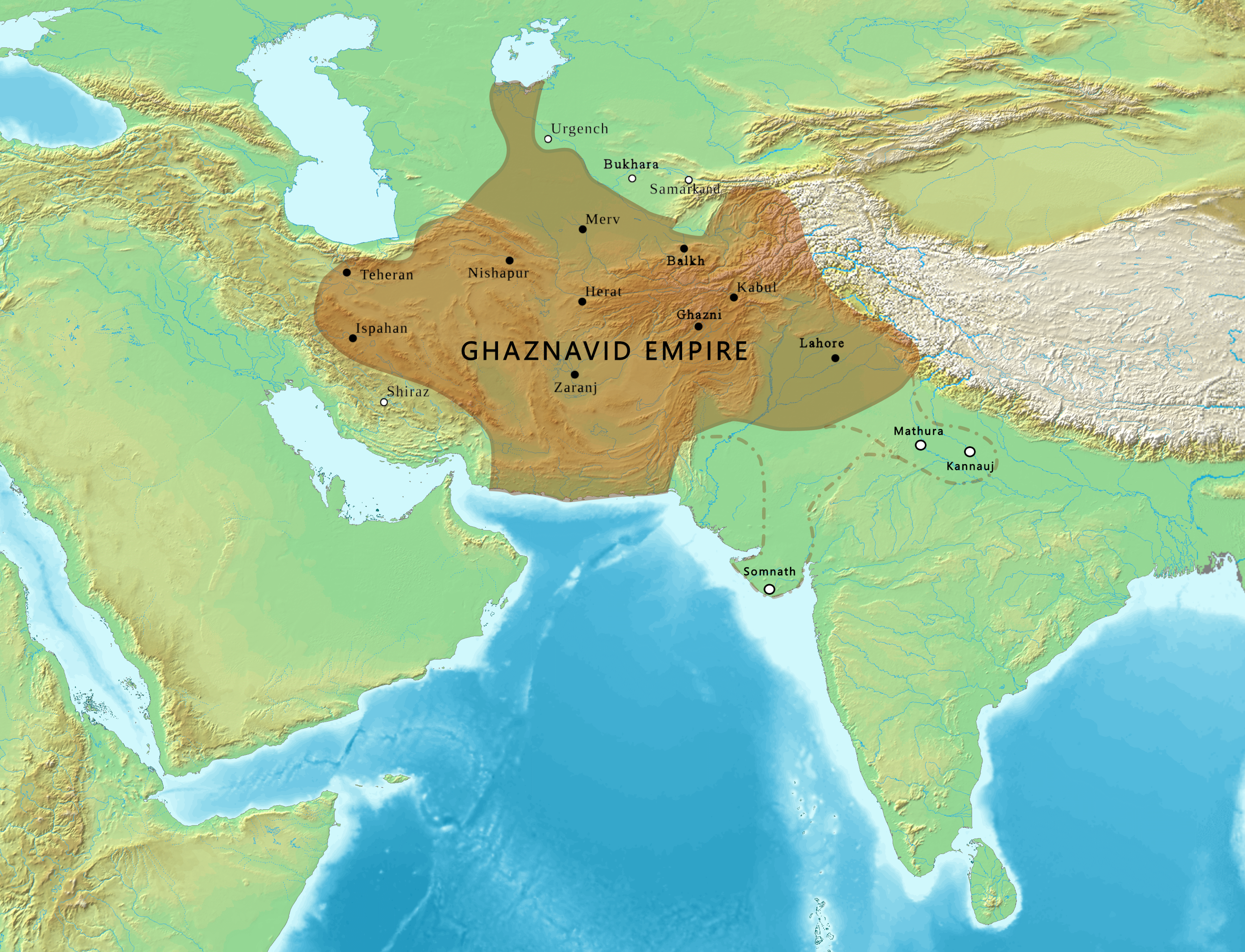
Ghaznavid Empire at its greatest extent in 1030 CE

In 997 CE, the Turkic ruler Mahmud of Ghazni, took over the Ghaznavid dynasty empire established by his father, Sebuktegin, a Turkic origin ruler. Starting from the city of Ghazni (now in Afghanistan), Mehmood conquered the bulk of Khorasan, marched on Peshawar against the Hindu Shahis in Kabul in 1005, and followed it by the conquests of Punjab (1007), deposed the Shia Ismaili rulers of Multan, (1011), Kashmir (1015) and Qanoch (1017). By the end of his reign in 1030, Mahmud's empire briefly extended from Kurdistan in the west to the Yamuna river in the east, and the Ghaznavid dynasty lasted until 1187. Contemporary historians such as Abolfazl Beyhaqi and Ferdowsi described extensive building work in Lahore, as well as Mahmud's support and patronage of learning, literature and the arts.

Mahmud's successors, known as the Ghaznavids, ruled for 157 years. Their kingdom gradually shrank in size, and was racked by bitter succession struggles. The Hindu Rajput kingdoms of western India reconquered the eastern Punjab, and by the 1160s, the line of demarcation between the Ghaznavid state and the Hindu kingdoms approximated to the present-day boundary between India and Pakistan. The Ghurid Empire of central Afghanistan occupied Ghazni around 1160, and the Ghaznavid capital was shifted to Lahore. Later Muhammad Ghori conquered the Ghaznavid kingdom, occupying Lahore in 1187.

=== Ghurid dynasty ===
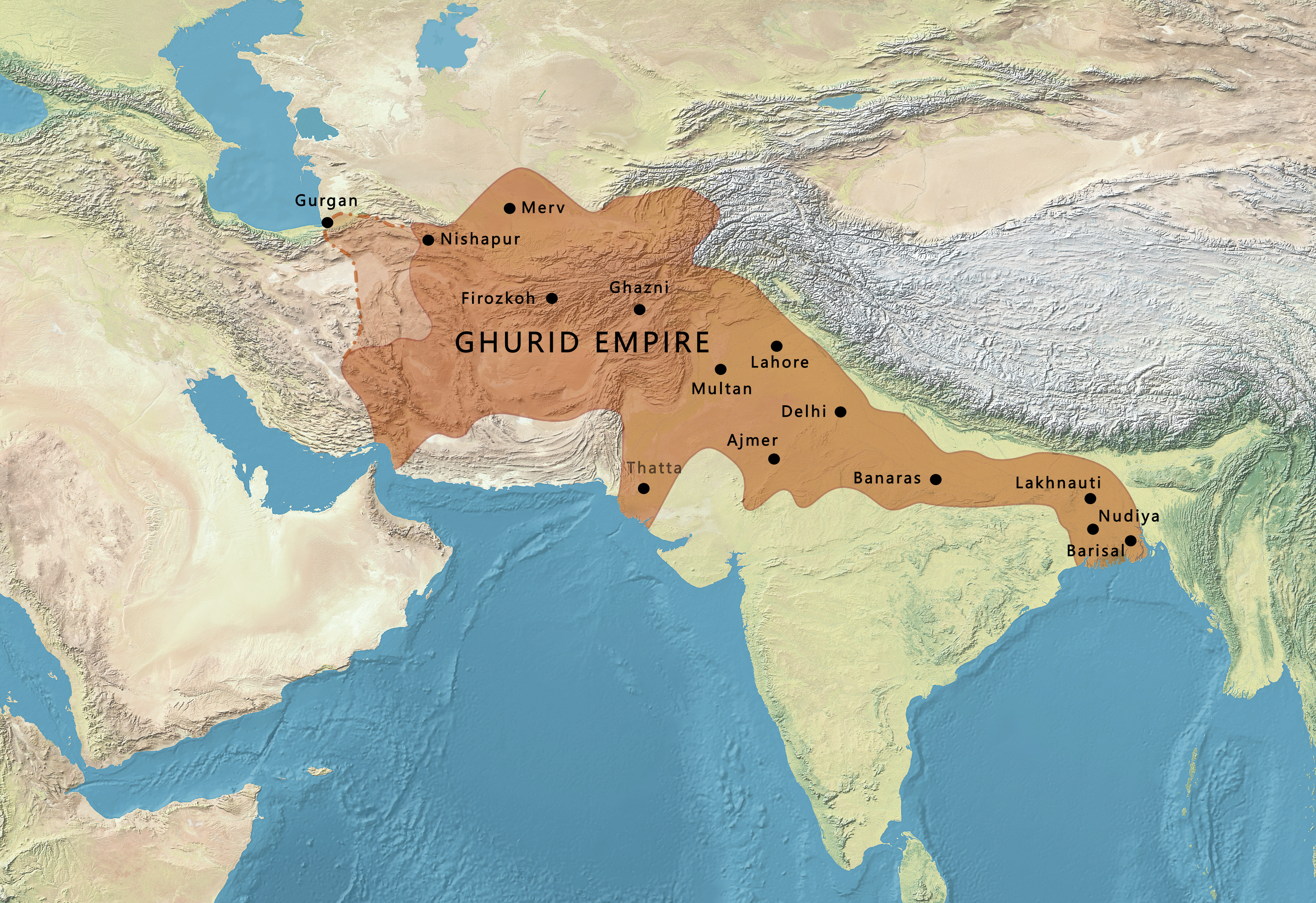
Map of Ghurid territory, before the assassination of Muhammad of Ghor. In the west, Ghurid territory extended to Nishapur and Merv, while Ghurid troops reached as far as Gorgan on the shores of the Caspian Sea. Eastward, the Ghurids invaded as far as Bengal.

The Ghaznavids under either Khusrau Shah or his son Khusrau Malik lost their control over Ghazni to the Ghuzz Turks along with some other territories. In the 1170s, Ghurid prince Muhammad of Ghor raided their territory and captured Ghazni from them and was crowned there by his brother Ghiyath al-Din Muhammad in 1173. Muhammad of Ghor marched from Gomal Pass into Pakistan and captured Multan and Uch before being rebuffed by Gujarat's Hindu Chaulukya (Solanki) rulers, which forced him to press upon the trumbling Ghaznavids. By 1186–87, he deposed the last Ghaznavid ruler Khusrau Malik, bringing the last of Ghaznevid territory under his control and ending the Ghaznavid empire. The Ghurids were overthrown in 1215, although their conquests in the Indian Subcontinent survived for several centuries under the Delhi Sultanate established by the Ghurid Mamluk Qutb ud-Din Aibak.

=== Delhi Sultanate ===
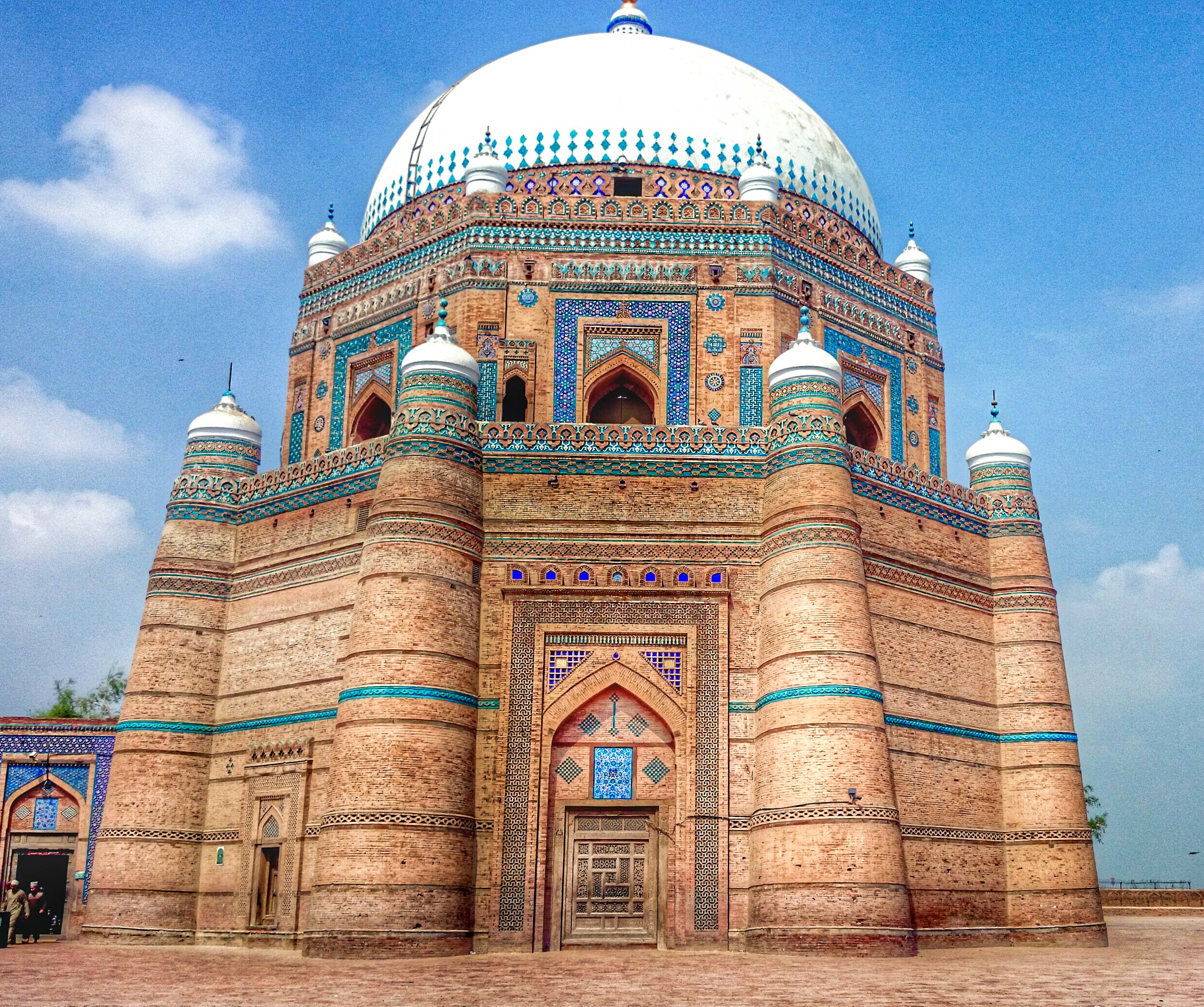
Tomb of Shah Rukn-e-Alam, built by Ghiyath al-Din Tughluq in 1324 CE

The Turkic origin Mamluk Dynasty, seized the throne of the Sultanate in 1211. Several dynasties ruled their empires from Delhi: the Mamluk (1211–90), the Khalji (1290–1320), the Tughlaq (1320–1413), the Sayyid (1414–1451) and the Lodhi (1451–1526). Although some kingdoms remained independent of Delhi, almost all of the Indus plain came under the rule of these large sultanates.

The sultans (emperors) of Delhi enjoyed cordial relations with rulers in the Near East but owed them no allegiance. While the sultans ruled from urban centres, their military camps and trading posts provided the nuclei for many towns that sprang up in the countryside. Close interaction with local populations led to cultural exchange and the resulting "Indo-Islamic" fusion has left a lasting imprint and legacy in South Asian architecture, music, literature, life style and religious customs. In addition, the language of Urdu (literally meaning "horde" or "camp" in various Turkic dialects, but more likely "city" in the South Asian context) was born during the Delhi Sultanate period, as a result of the mingling of speakers of native Prakrits, Persian, Turkish and Arabic languages.

Perhaps the greatest contribution of the Sultanate was its temporary success in insulating South Asia from the Mongol invasion from Central Asia in the 13th century; nonetheless the sultans eventually lost western Pakistan to the Mongols (see the Ilkhanate dynasty). The Sultanate declined after the invasion of Emperor Timur, who founded the Timurid Empire, and was eventually conquered in 1526 by the Mughal Emperor Babar.

The Delhi Sultanate and later Mughal Empire attracted Muslim refugees, nobles, technocrats, bureaucrats, soldiers, traders, scientists, architects, artisans, teachers, poets, artists, theologians and Sufis from the rest of the Muslim world and they migrated and settled in the South Asia. During the reign of Sultan Ghyasuddin Balban (1266–1286) thousands of Central Asian Muslims sought asylum including more than 15 sovereigns and their nobles due to the Mongol invasion of Khwarezmia and Eastern Iran. At the court of Sultan Iltemish in Delhi the first wave of these Muslim refugees escaping from the Central Asian genocide by the Mongol armies of Genghis Khan, brought administrators from Iran, painters from China, theologians from Samarkand, Nishapur and Bukhara, divines and saints from the rest of Muslim world, craftsmen and men and maidens from every region, notably doctors adept in Greek medicine and philosophers from everywhere.

=== Kingdom of Sindh ===
==== Soomra dynasty ====
The Soomra dynasty was a local Sindhi Muslim dynasty that ruled between the early 11th century and the 14th century.

Later chroniclers like Ali ibn al-Athir (c. late 12th c.) and Ibn Khaldun (c. late 14th c.) attributed the fall of Habbarids to Mahmud of Ghazni, lending credence to the argument of Hafif being the last Habbarid. The Soomras appear to have established themselves as a regional power in this power vacuum.

The Ghurids and Ghaznavids continued to rule parts of Sindh, across the eleventh and early twelfth centuries, alongside the Soomrus. The precise delineations are not yet known, but Sommrus were probably centred in lower Sindh.

Some of them were adherents of Isma'ilism. One of their kings, Shimuddin Chanisar, had submitted to Iltutmish, the Sultan of Delhi, and was allowed to continue on as a vassal.

==== Samma dynasty ====
Makli Necropolis
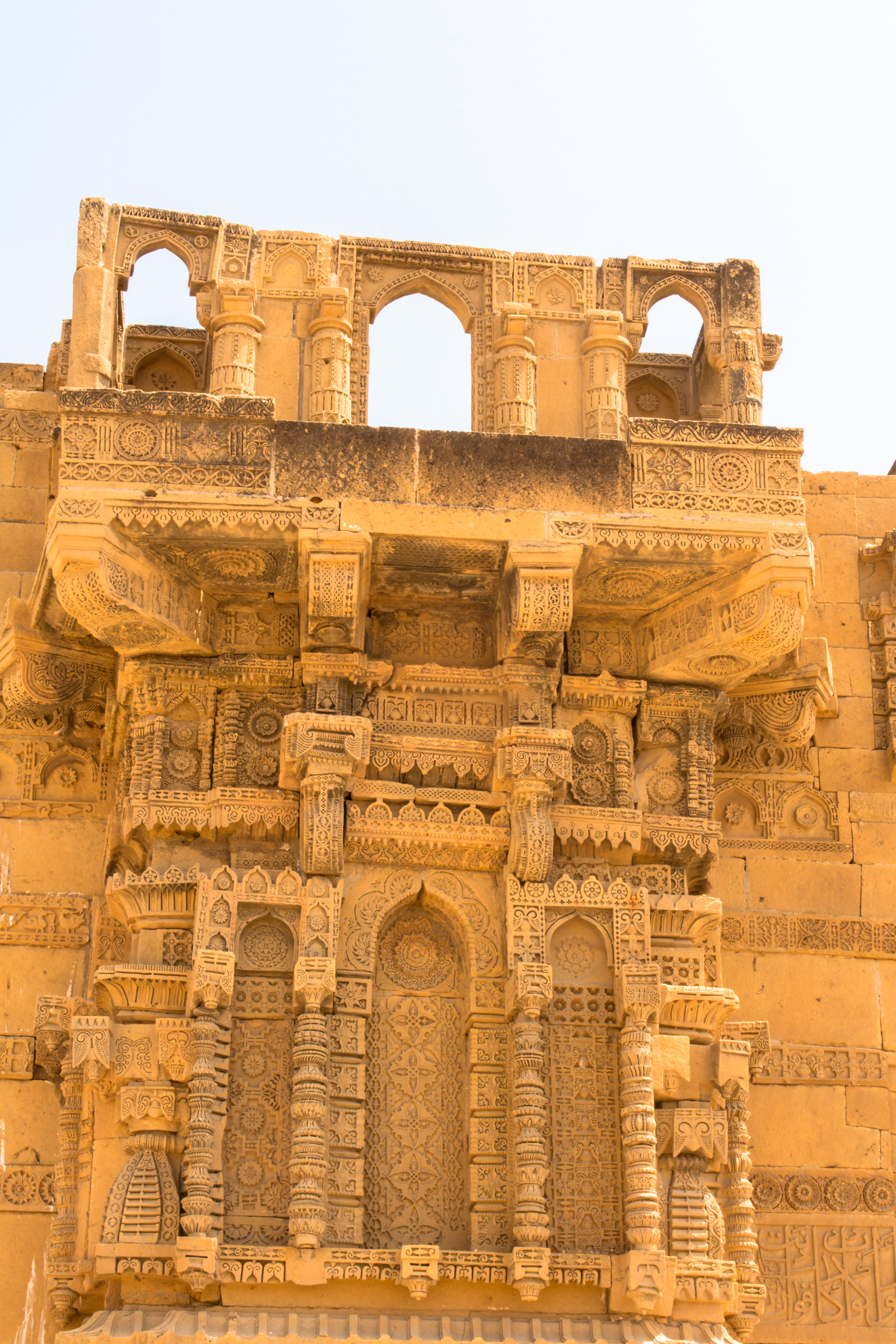
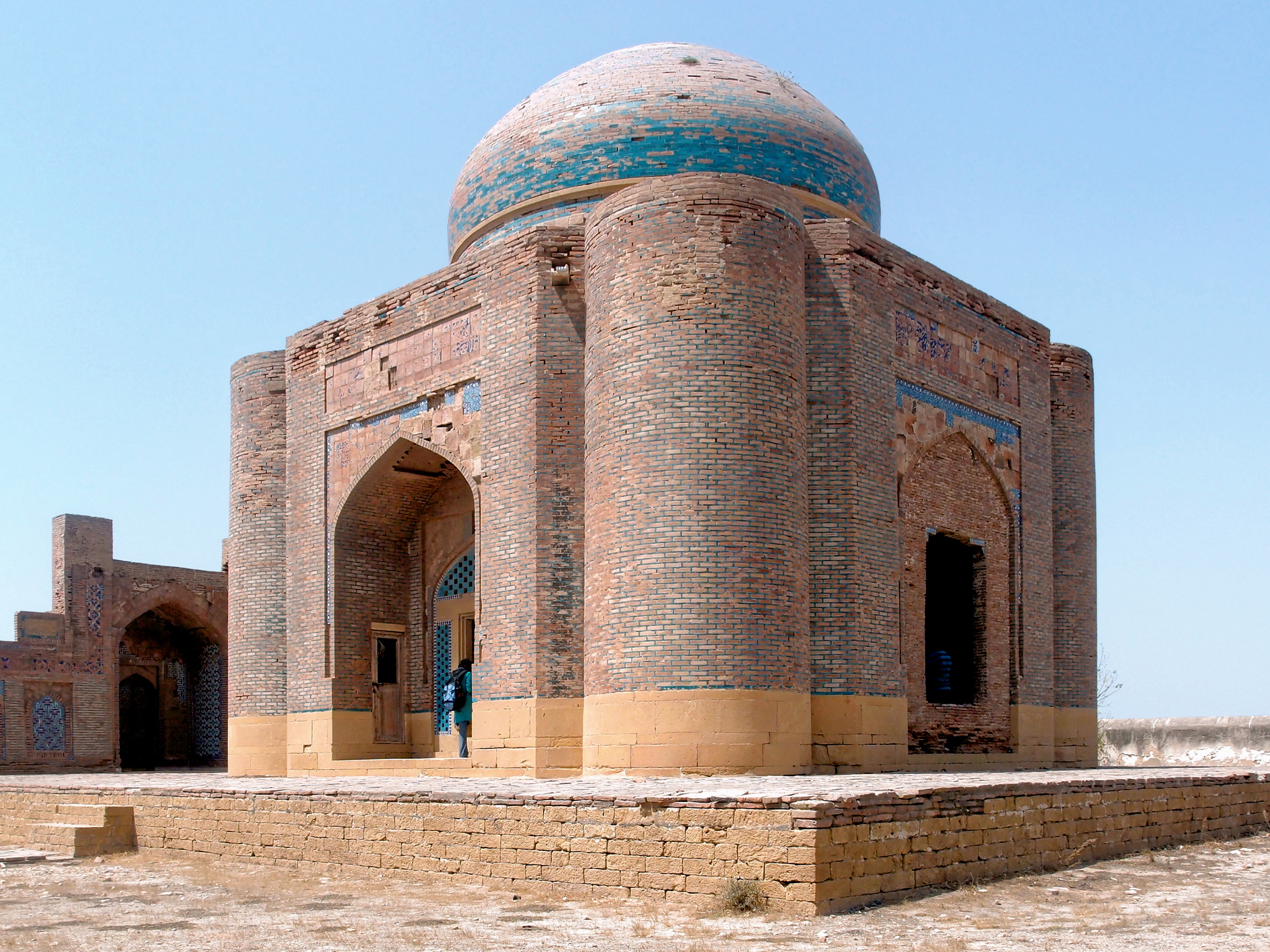
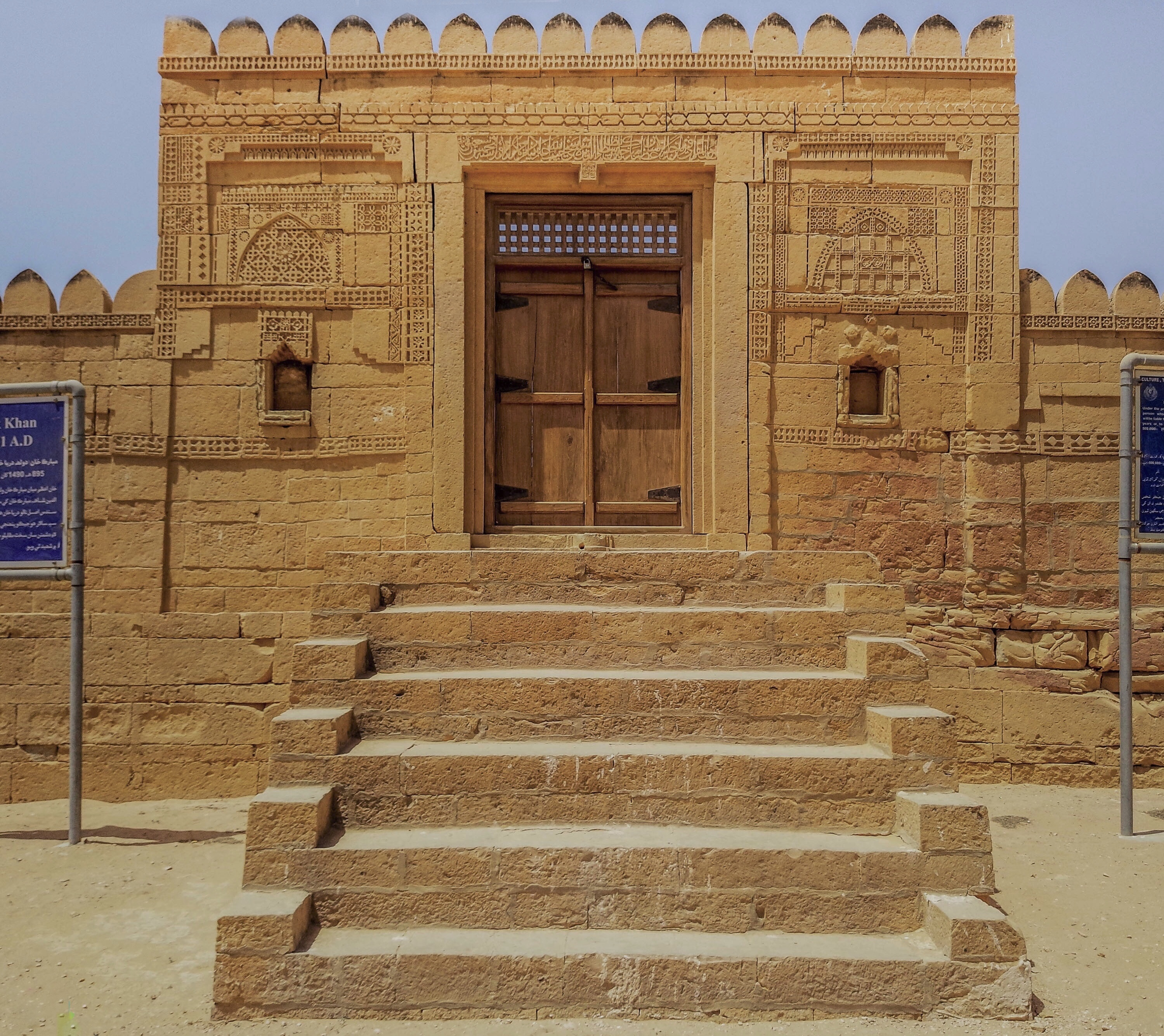
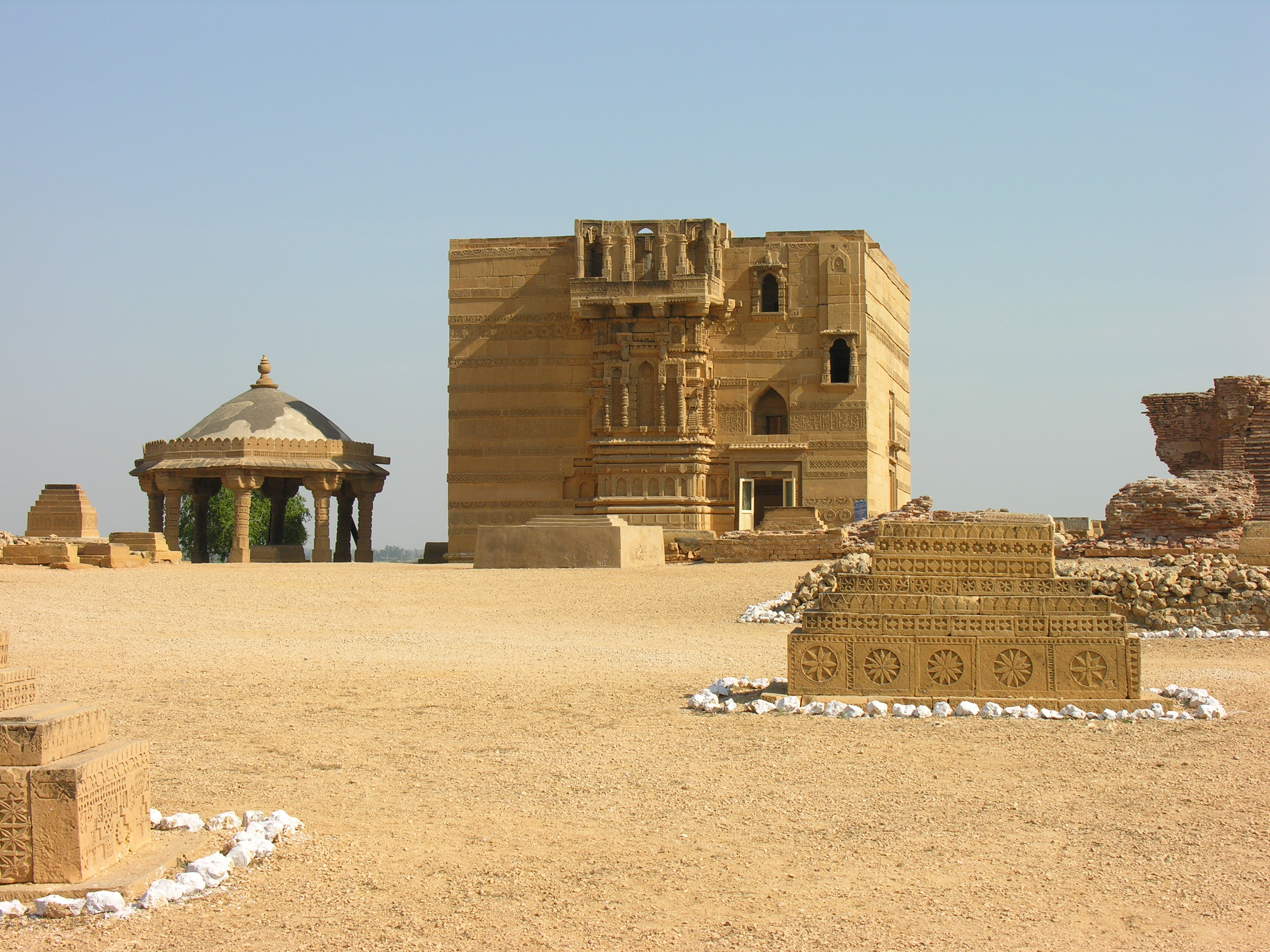
The Makli Necropolis at Thatta is one of the largest funerary sites in the world.

The Samma dynasty was a Sindhi dynasty that ruled in Sindh, and parts of Kutch, Punjab and Balochistan from c. 1351 to c. 1524 CE, with their capital at Thatta.

The Sammas overthrew the Soomra dynasty soon after 1335 and the last Soomra ruler took shelter with the governor of Gujarat, under the protection of Muhammad bin Tughluq, the sultan of Delhi. Mohammad bin Tughlaq made an expedition against Sindh in 1351 and died at Sondha, possibly in an attempt to restore the Soomras. With this, the Sammas became independent. The next sultan, Firuz Shah Tughlaq attacked Sindh in 1365 and 1367, unsuccessfully, but with reinforcements from Delhi he later obtained Banbhiniyo's surrender. For a period the Sammas were therefore subject to Delhi again. Later, as the Sultanate of Delhi collapsed they became fully independent. Jam Unar was the founder of Samma dynasty mentioned by Ibn Battuta.

The Samma civilisation contributed significantly to the evolution of Indo-Islamic architecture. Thatta is famous for its necropolis, which covers 10 square km on the Makli Hill. It has left its mark in Sindh with magnificent structures including the Makli Necropolis of its royals in Thatta.

== Early Modern Period ==
=== Mughal Empire ===
Mughal Architecture in Pakistan

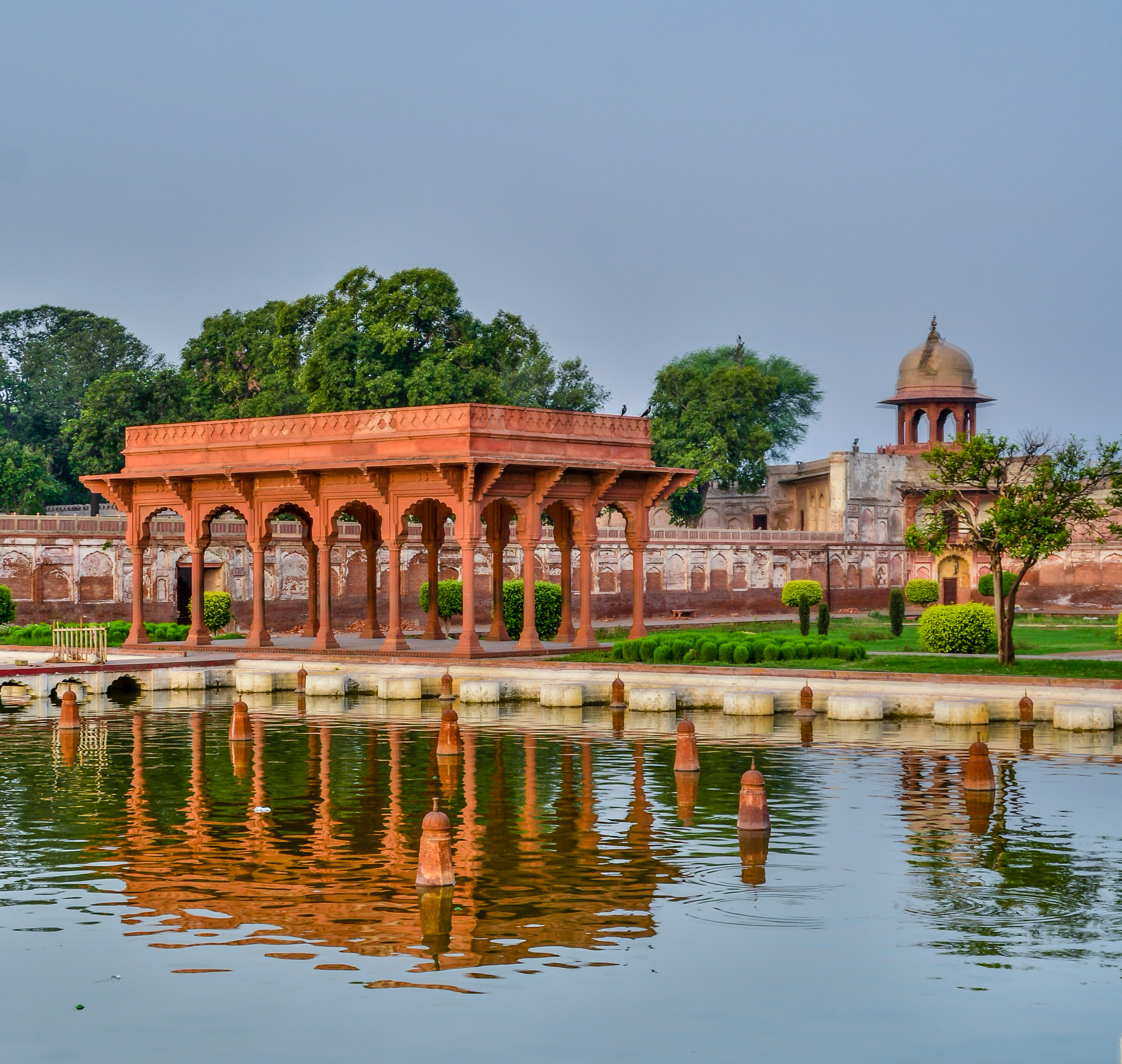
Shalimar Gardens at Lahore

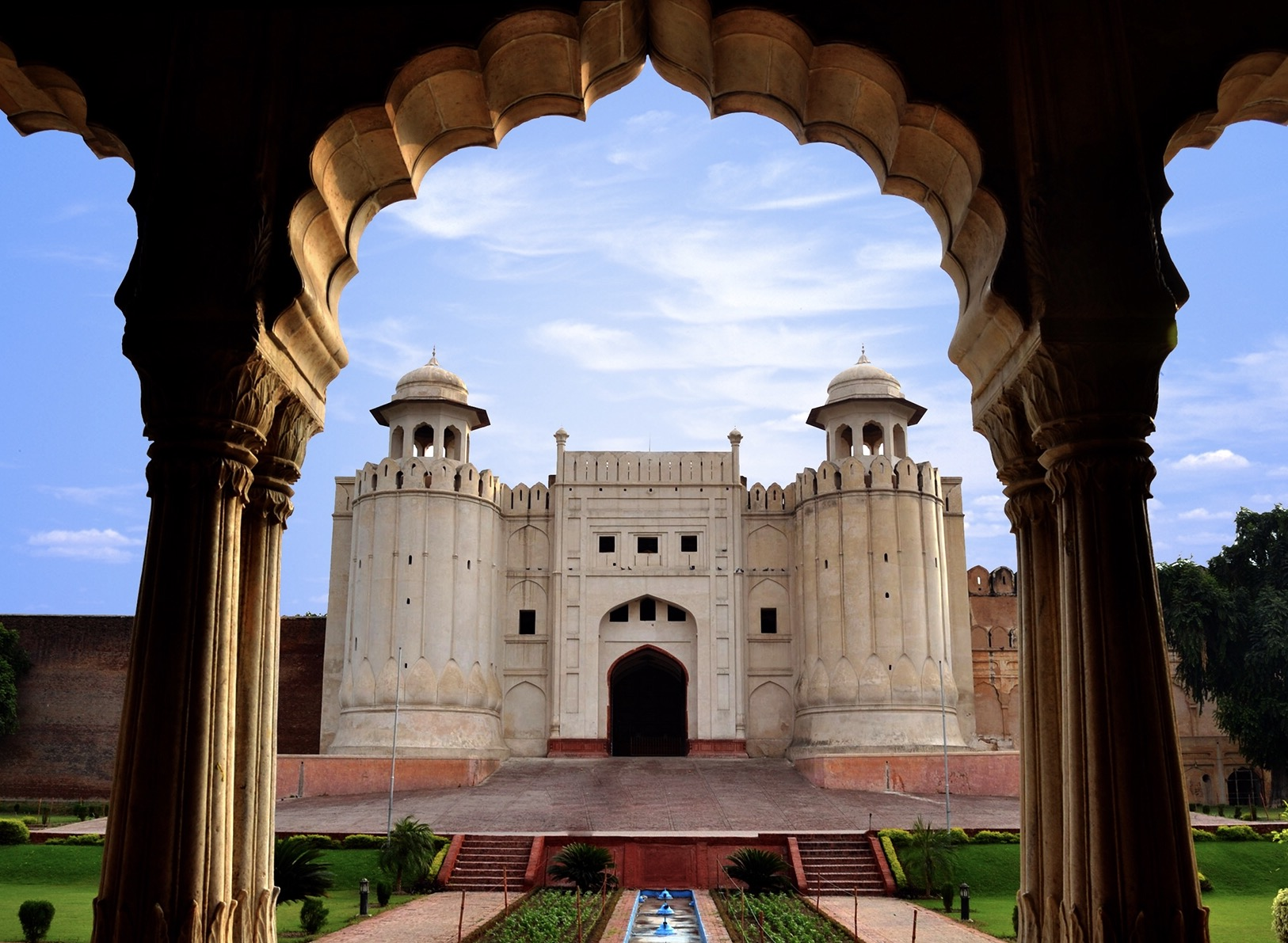
The Alamgiri Gate of the Lahore Fort was built during the reign of Aurangzeb.

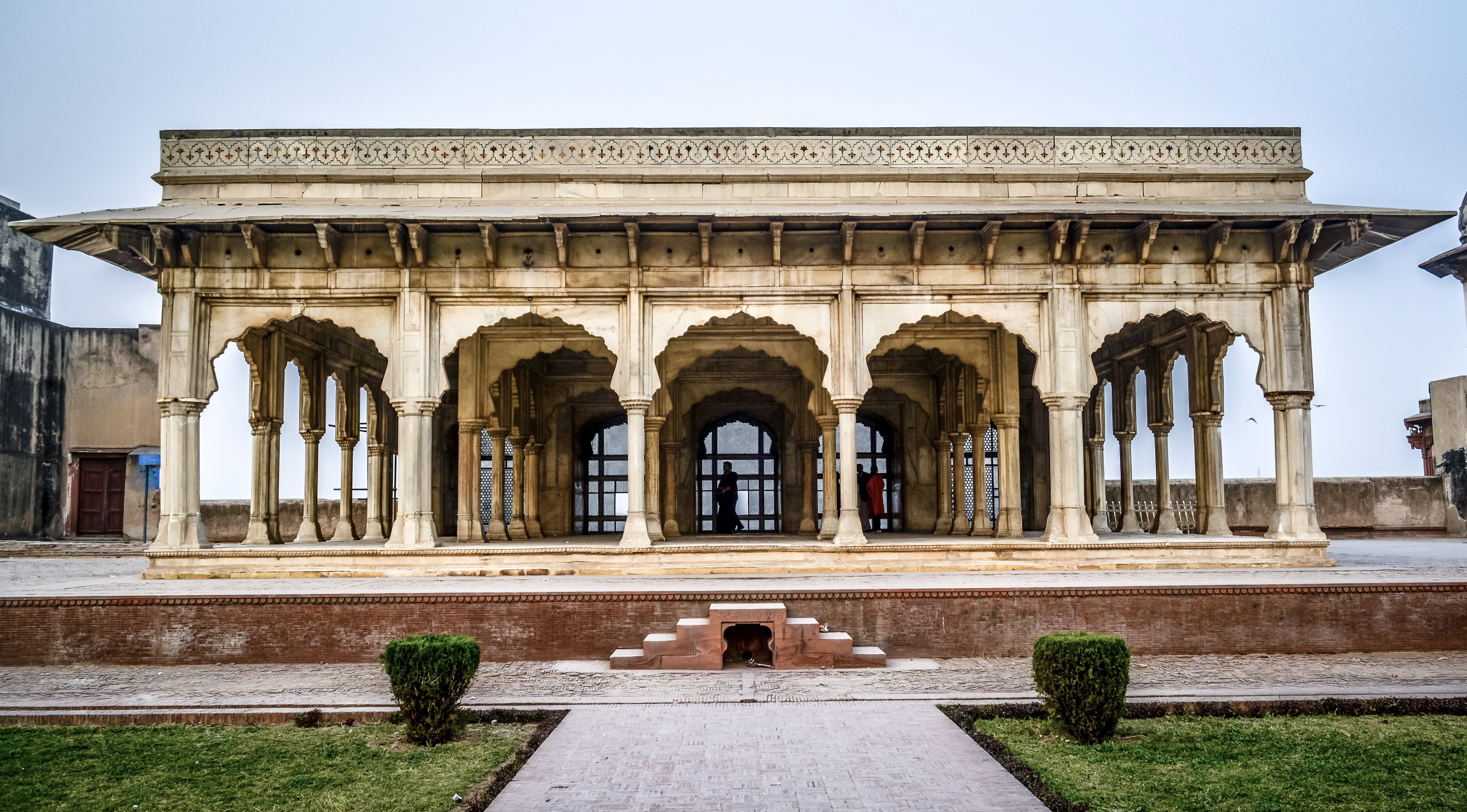
Diwan-i-Khas at Lahore Fort was built during the reign of Shah Jahan.

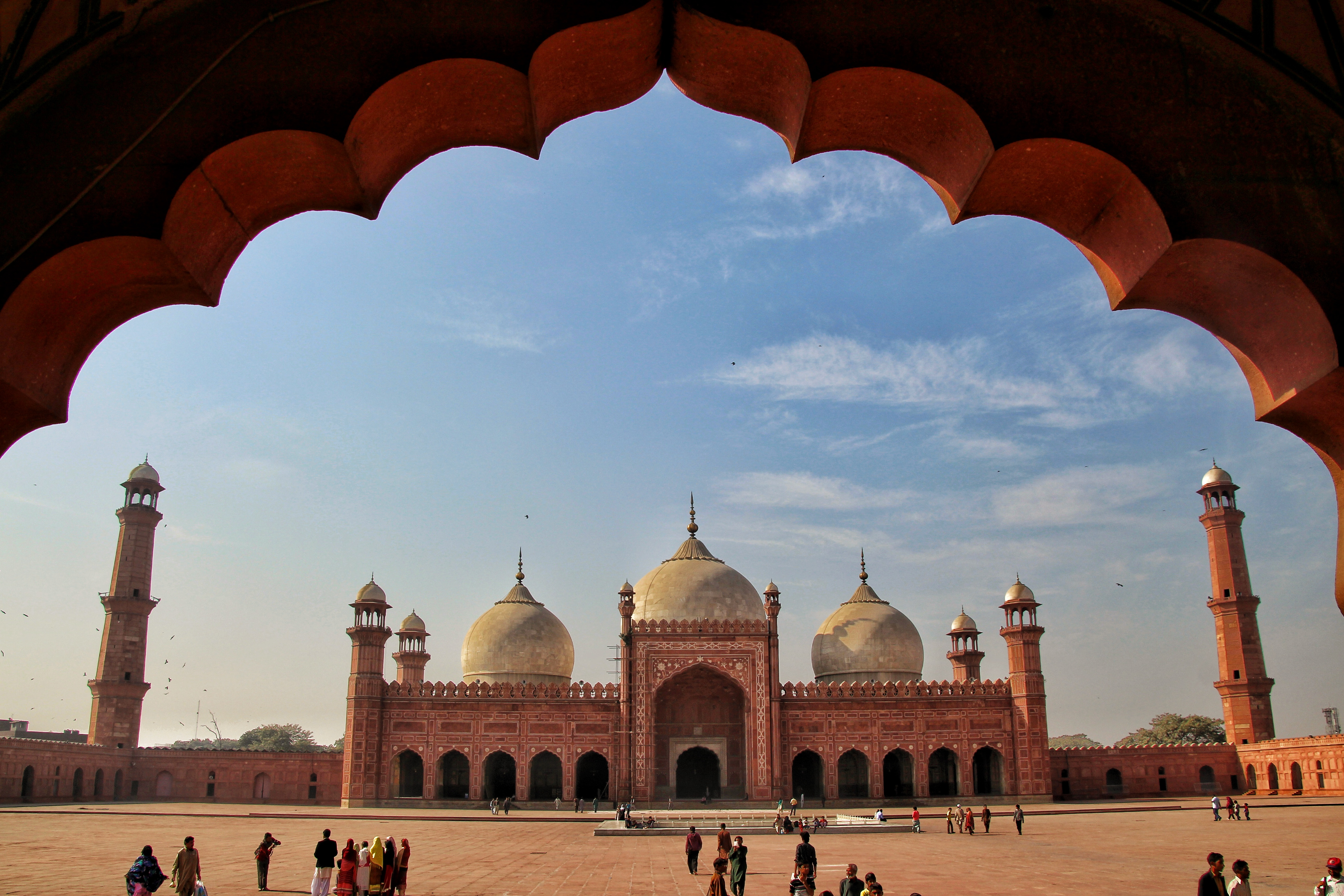
The Badshahi Mosque, built by Aurangzeb, is one of the largest mosques in Pakistan.

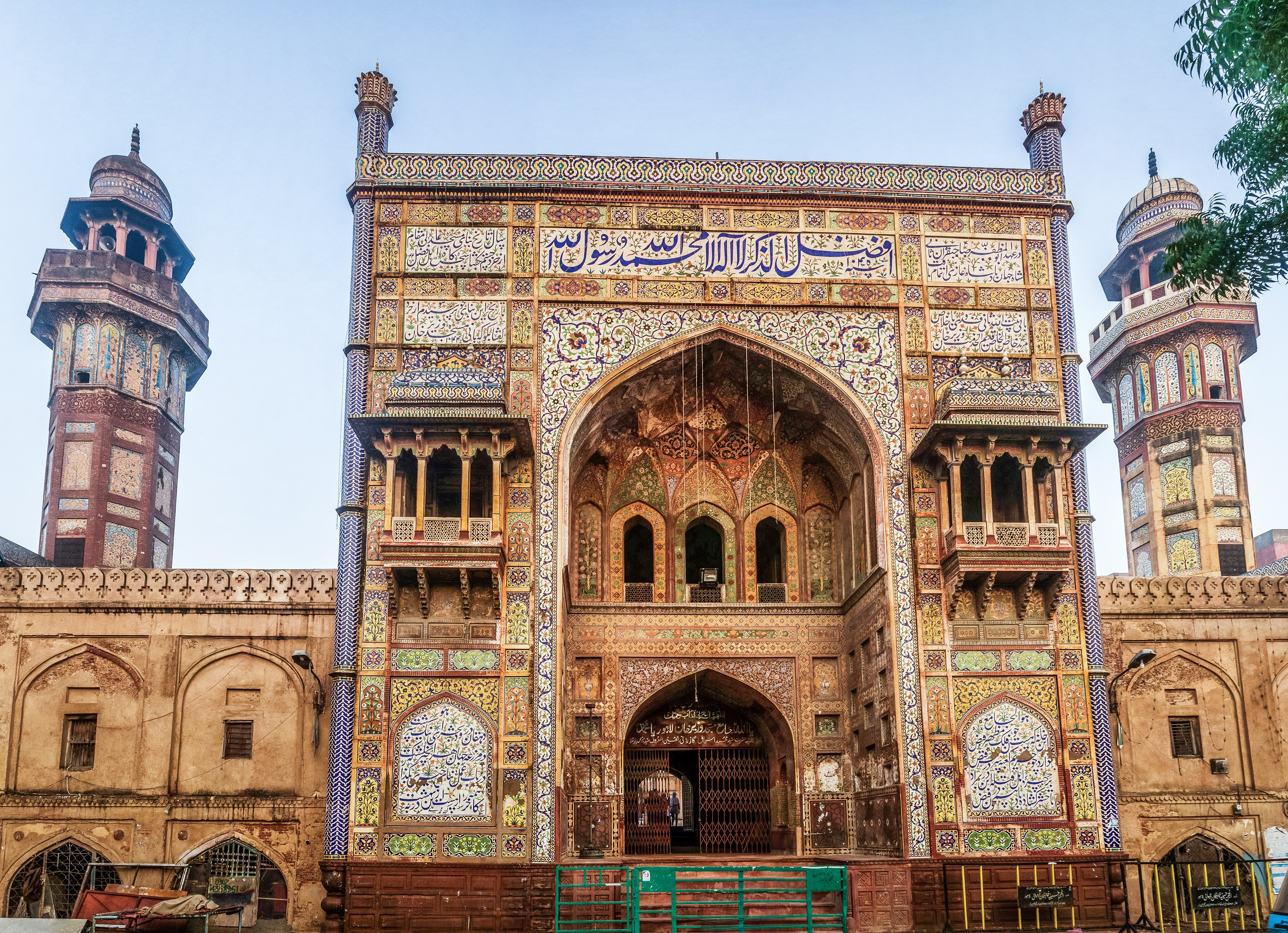
Wazir Khan Mosque at Lahore, richly decorated with Mughal frescoes

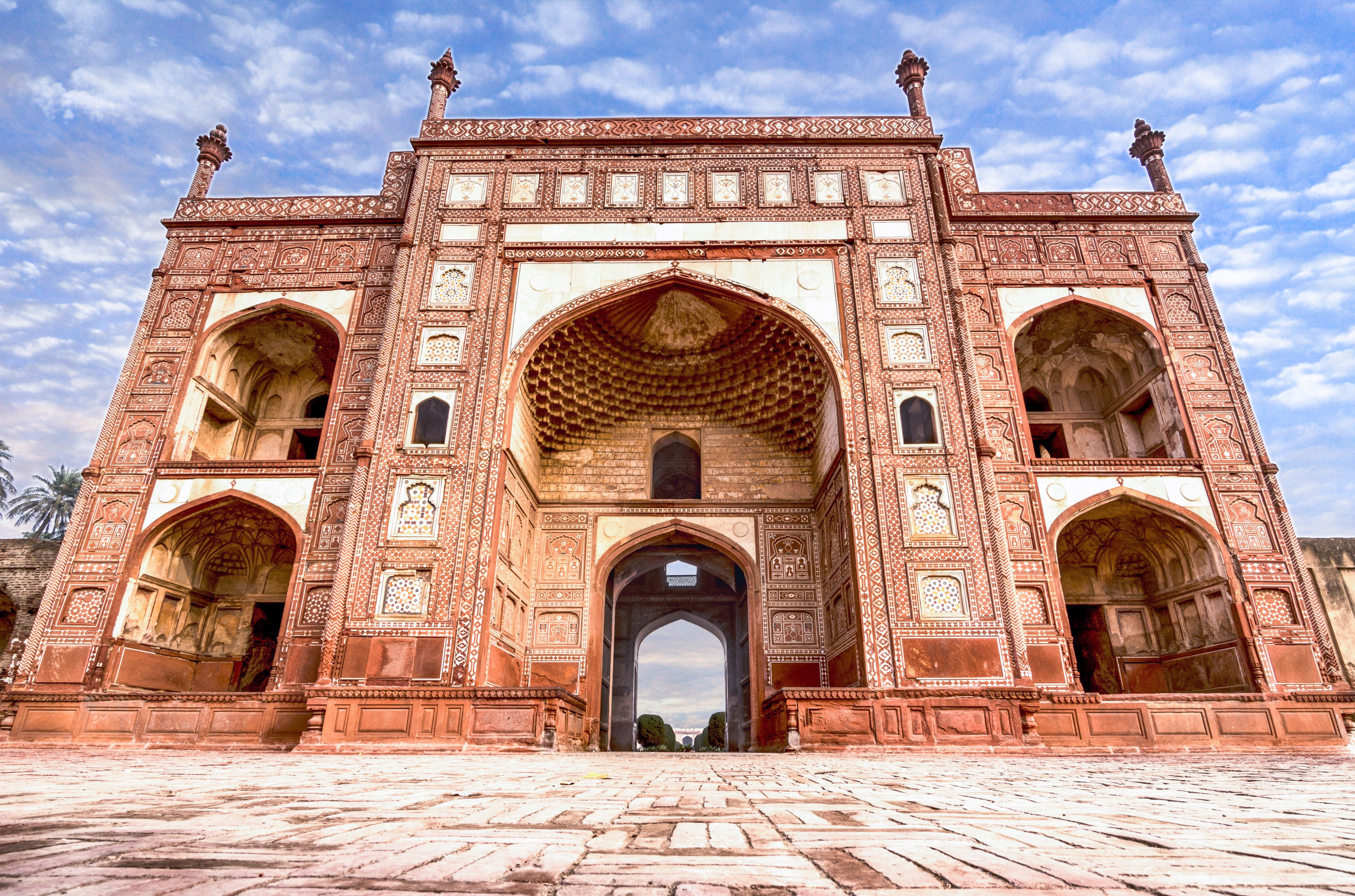
The Akbari Sarai features a monumental gateway that leads to the Tomb of Jahangir.

In 1526, Babur, a Timurid descendant of Timur and Genghis Khan from Fergana Valley (modern-day Uzbekistan), swept across the Khyber Pass and founded the Mughal Empire, covering parts of modern-day eastern- Afghanistan, much of what is now Pakistan, parts of India and Bangladesh. The Mughals were descended from Central Asian Turks (with significant Mongol admixture).

However, his son and successor Humayun was defeated by Sher Shah Suri of Sasaram, in the year 1540, and Humayun was forced to retreat to Kabul. After Sher Shah died, his son Islam Shah Suri became the ruler, on whose death his prime minister, Hemu, ascended the throne and ruled North India from Delhi for one month. He was defeated by Emperor Akbar's forces in the Second Battle of Panipat on 6 November 1556.

Akbar was both a capable ruler and an early proponent of religious and ethnic tolerance and favored an early form of multiculturalism. For example, he declared "Amari" or non-killing of animals in the holy days of Jainism and rolled back the jizya tax imposed upon non-Islamic, mainly Hindu people. The Mughal dynasty ruled most of South Asia by 1600. The Mughal emperors married local royalty and allied themselves with local maharajas. Akbar was succeeded by Jahangir, who was succeeded by Shah Jahan. Shah Jahan was replaced by Aurangzeb following the Mughal war of succession (1658–1659).

After the death of Aurangzeb in 1707, the empire went into a rapid decline, as several regional rulers began asserting independence, and by about 1720 only really controlled a small region around Delhi. The emperors continued to have lip service paid to them as "Emperor of India" by the other powers in South Asia until the British finally abolished the empire in 1858.

For a short time in the late 16th century, Lahore was the capital of the empire. The architectural legacy of the Mughals includes the Lahore Fort, Wazir Khan Mosque, Shalimar Gardens, Tomb of Jahangir, Tomb of Nur Jahan, Akbari Sarai, Hiran Minar, Shah Jahan Mosque and the Badshahi Mosque. The Mughal Empire had a great impact on the culture, cuisine, and architecture of Pakistan.

=== 18th Century Punjabi Muslim states ===
==== Chattha State (1750–1797) ====
The Chatthas under their leader Nur Muhammad Chattha declared independence from Mughal Empire in 1750 and formed the Chattha State. After Pir Muhammad Chattha's death his son Ghulam Muhammad Chattha inherited the Chattha state and the hatred of Sukerchakias. The rivalry was passed down to Mahan Singh and Ghulam Muhammad Chattha.

Under his leadership the Chathas gained several successes over the Sikhs, and it at one time looked as if the progress of the Sikh arms had been arrested and their dominion in the Doab annihilated.

Chattha State was annexed when Jan muhammad Chattha was killed in a siege led by Ranjit Singh when the latter recovered the lost Chattha state with Afghan aid.

==== Pakpattan state (1692–1810 CE) ====
Following the disintegration of the Mughal Empire, the shrine's Dīwān was able to forge a political independent state centered on Pakpattan. In 1757, Dīwān 'Abd as-Subḥān gathered an army of his Jat murīds, attacked the Raja of Bikaner, and thereby expanded the shrine's territorial holdings for the first time east of the Sutlej. Around 1776, the Dīwān, supported mainly by his Wattu murīds, successfully repelled an attack by the Sikh Nakai Misl, resulting in the death of the Nakai leader, Heera Singh Sandhu.

==== Sial State (1723–1816) ====
Sial state in central Punjab was established by the 13th Sial Chief Nawab Walidad Khan Sial in 1723. He gradually gained control of the lower Rachna doab, including the cities of Chiniot, Pindi Bhattian, Jhang and Mankera. The next chief, Inayatullah Khan (r. 1747– 1787) was a successful general who won 22 battles against Bhangi Misl and the Multan chiefs.

The Sikh Empire invaded Jhang multiple times from 1801 to 1816, and the Sial state was finally annexed by the Sikh Empire with Ahmad Khan Sial awarded a jagir by Ranjit Singh.

=== Maratha Empire ===
The Hindu Marathas had been a growing regional power based in modern Maharashtra, in frequent conflict with the Mughals, especially in the Deccan wars from 1680. As Mughal power collapsed, they became one of the largest and most aggressive of the emerging powers. In 1749, the Mughals were induced to cede Sindh, the Punjab region and the important trans Indus River to Ahmad Shah Durrani in order to save the capital from Afghan attack. Ahmad Shah sacked Delhi in 1757 but permitted the Mughal dynasty to remain in nominal control of the city as long as the ruler acknowledged Ahmad Shah's suzerainty over Punjab, Sindh, and Kashmir. Leaving his second son Timur Shah to safeguard his interests, Ahmad Shah left India to return to Afghanistan.

In 1751–52, Ahamdiya treaty was signed between the Marathas and Mughals, when Balaji Bajirao was the Peshwa. Through this treaty, the Marathas controlled whole of India from their capital at Pune and the Mughal rule was restricted only to Delhi (the Mughals remained the nominal heads of Delhi). Marathas were now straining to expand their area of control towards the Northwest of India. Ahmad Shah sacked the Mughal capital and withdrew with the booty he coveted. To counter the Afghans, Peshwa Balaji Bajirao sent Raghunathrao. He defeated the Rohillas and Afghan garrisons in Punjab and succeeded in ousting Timur Shah and his court from India and brought Lahore, Multan, Kashmir and other subahs on the Indian side of Attock under Maratha rule. Thus, upon his return to Kandahar in 1757, Ahmad was forced to return to India and face the Maratha Confederacy.

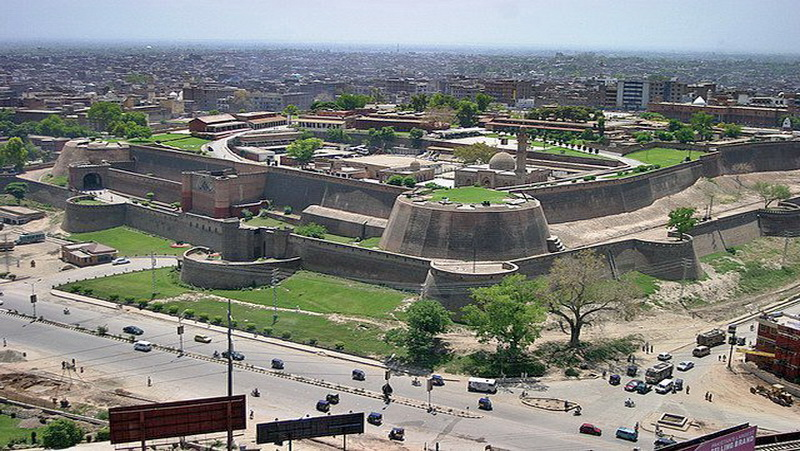
The Bala Hissar fort in Peshawar was one of the royal residences of the Durrani kings.

In 1758, the Maratha general Raghunath Rao attacked and conquered Punjab, frontier regions and Kashmir and drove out Timur Shah Durrani, the son and viceroy of Ahmad Shah Abdali. In 1759, the Marathas and its allies won the Battle of Lahore, defeating the Durranis, hence, Lahore, Dera Ghazi Khan, Multan, Peshawar, Kashmir, and other subahs on the south eastern side of Afghanistan's border fell under the Maratha rule.

Ahmad Shah declared a jihad (or Islamic holy war) against the Maratha Empire, and warriors from various Afghan tribes joined his army. Early skirmishes were followed by decisive victory for the Afghans against the much larger Maratha garrisons in Northwest India and by 1759 Ahmad Shah and his army reached Lahore and were poised to confront the Marathas. By 1760, the Maratha groups had coalesced into a big enough army under the command of Sadashivrao Bhau. Once again, Panipat was the scene of a confrontation between two warring contenders for control of northern India. The Third Battle of Panipat (14 January 1761), fought between largely Muslim and largely Hindu armies was waged along a twelve-kilometer front. Although the Durrani's army decisively defeated the Marathas, they suffered heavily in the battle.

The victory at Panipat was the high point of Ahmad Shah's—and Afghan—power. However, even prior to his death, the empire began to face challenges in the form of rising Sikh power in Punjab. In 1762, Ahmad Shah crossed the passes from Afghanistan for the sixth time to subdue the Sikhs. From this time and on, the domination and control of the Afghans began to loosen, and by the time of Durrani's death he had completely lost Punjab to the Sikhs, as well as earlier losses of northern territories to the Uzbeks, necessitating a compromise with them.

=== Sikh Empire ===
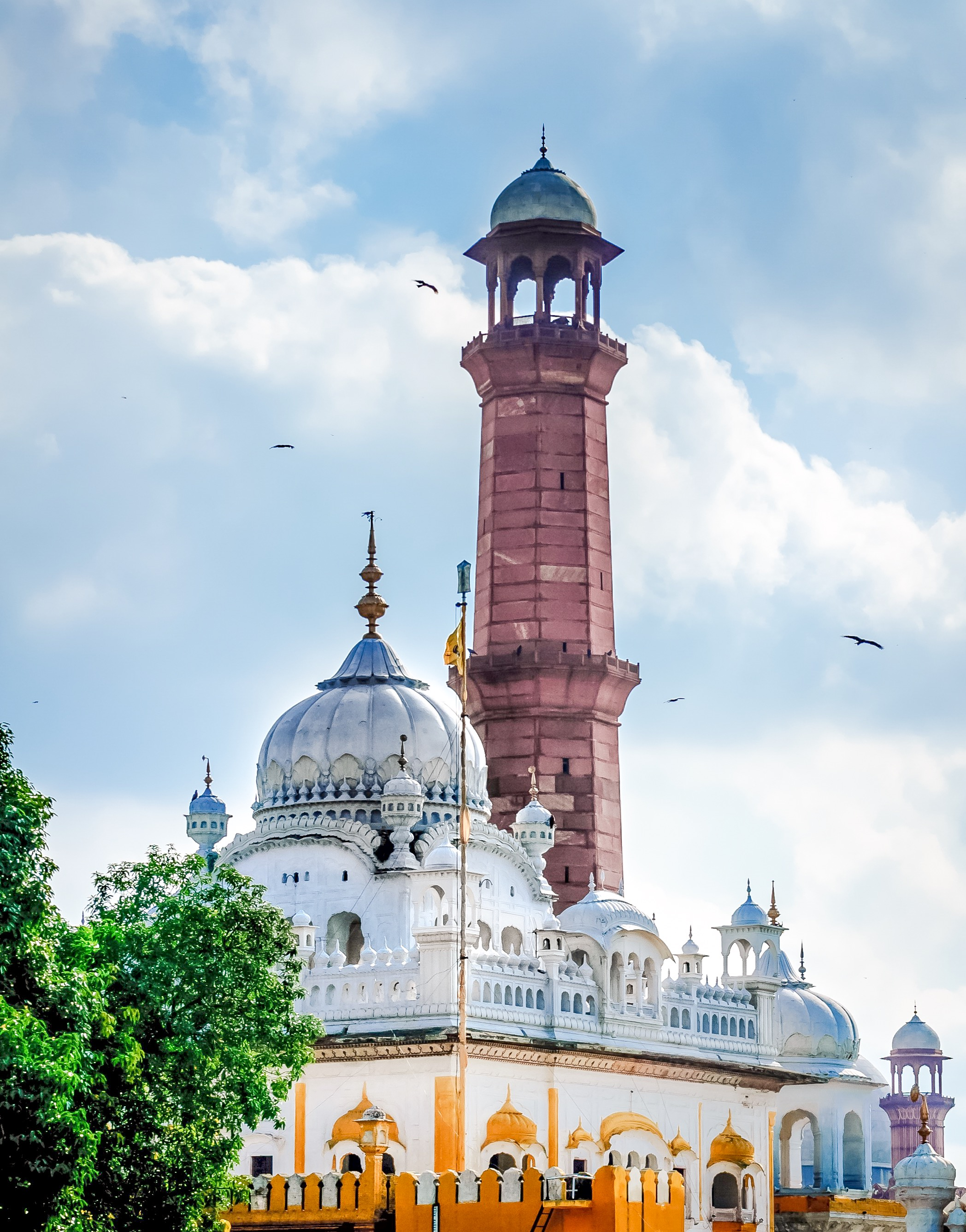
Samadhi of Ranjit Singh, with the minaret of Badshahi Mosque in the background

Guru Nanak (29 November 1469 – 22 September 1539), Sikhism's founder, was born into a Hindu Khatri family in the village of Rāi Bhōi dī Talwandī (present day Nankana, near Sial in modern-day Pakistan). He was an influential religious and social reformer in north India and the saintly founder of a modern monotheistic order and first of the ten divine Gurus of Sikh religion. At the age of 70, he died at Kartarpur, Punjab of modern-day Pakistan.

The Sikh Empire (1799–1849) was formed on the foundations of the Sikh Khalsa Army by Maharaja Ranjit Singh who was proclaimed "Sarkar-i-Khalsa", and was referred to as the "Maharaja of Lahore". It consisted of a collection of autonomous Punjabi Misls, which were governed by Misldars, mainly in the Punjab region. The empire extended from the Khyber Pass in the west, to Kashmir in the north, to Multan in the south and Kapurthala in the east. The main geographical footprint of the empire was the Punjab region. The formation of the empire was a watershed and represented formidable consolidation of Sikh military power and resurgence of local culture, which had been dominated for hundreds of years by Indo-Afghan and Indo-Mughal hybrid cultures.

The foundations of the Sikh Empire, during the time of the Sikh Khalsa Army, could be defined as early as 1707, starting from the death of Aurangzeb. The fall of the Mughal Empire provided opportunities for the Sikh army to lead expeditions against the Mughals and Pashtuns. This led to a growth of the army, which was split into different Sikh armies and then semi-independent "misls". Each of these component armies were known as a misl, each controlling different areas and cities. However, in the period from 1762 to 1799, Sikh rulers of their misls appeared to be coming into their own. The formal start of the Sikh Empire began with the disbandment of the Sikh Khalsa Army by the time of coronation of Ranjit Singh in 1801, creating a unified political state. All the misl leaders who were affiliated with the Army were from Punjab's nobility.

== Colonial period ==
Indo-Saracenic Revival architecture in Pakistan

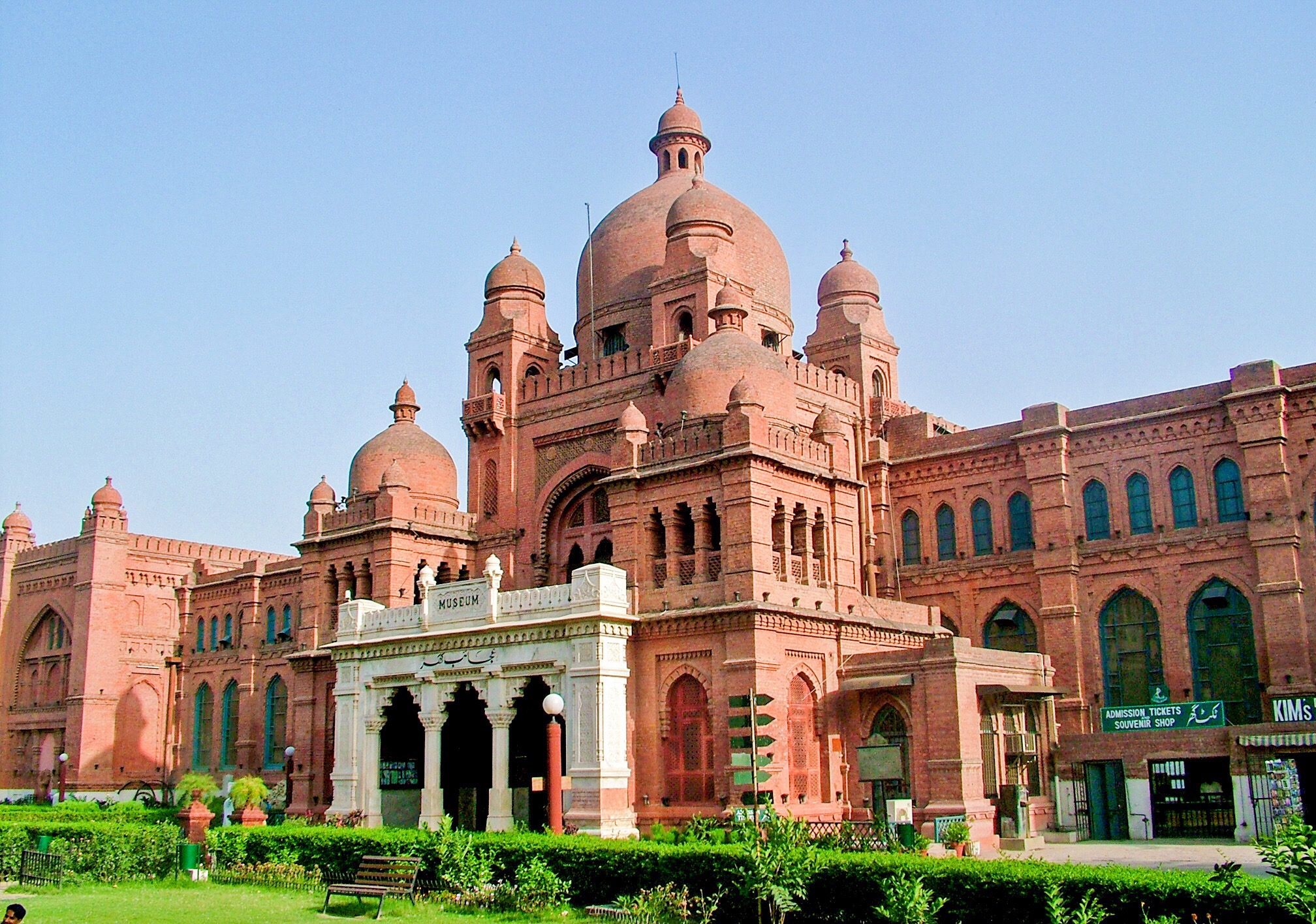
Lahore Museum

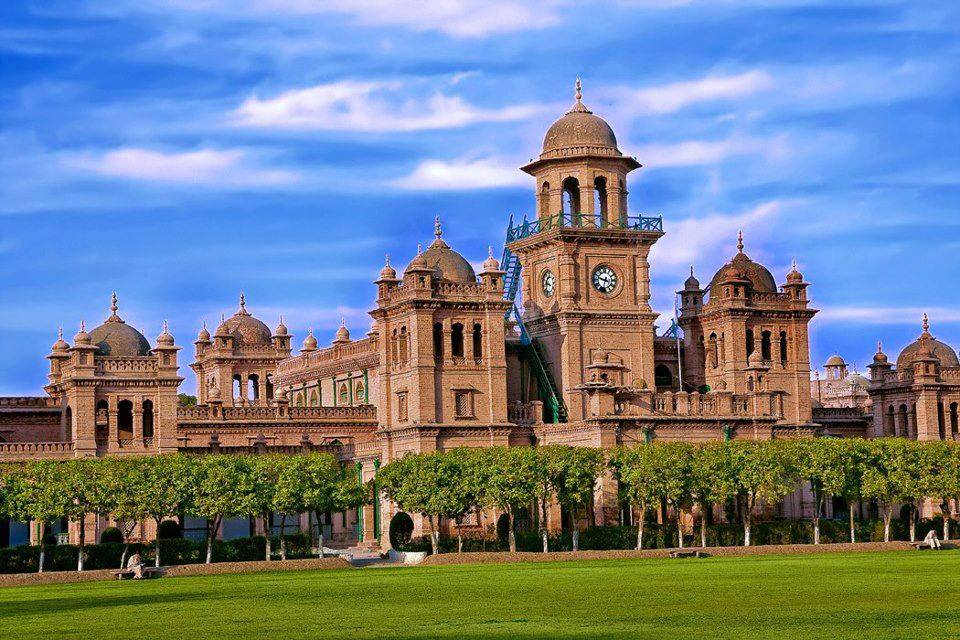
Islamia College, Peshawar

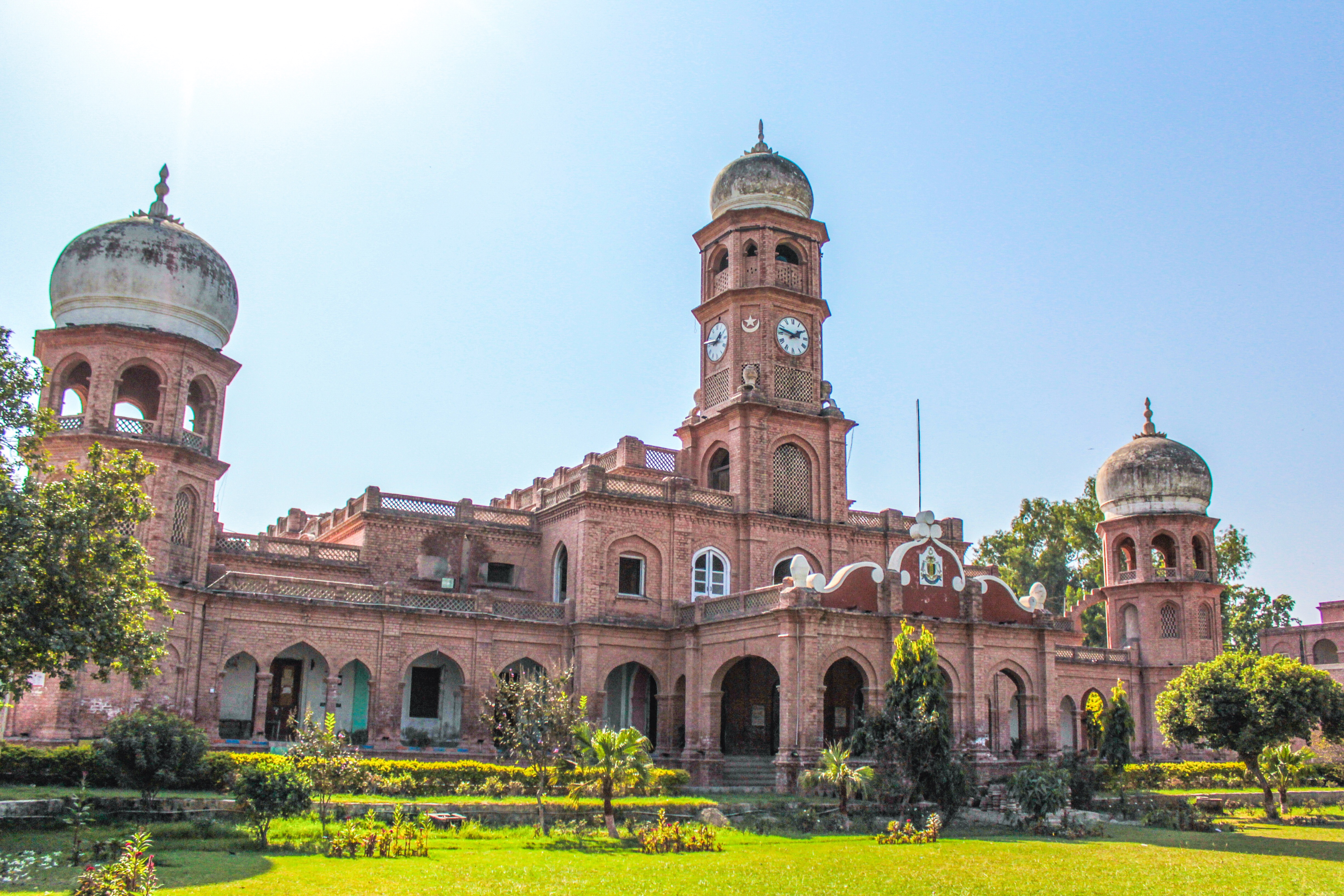
Sadiq Dane High School, Bahawalpur

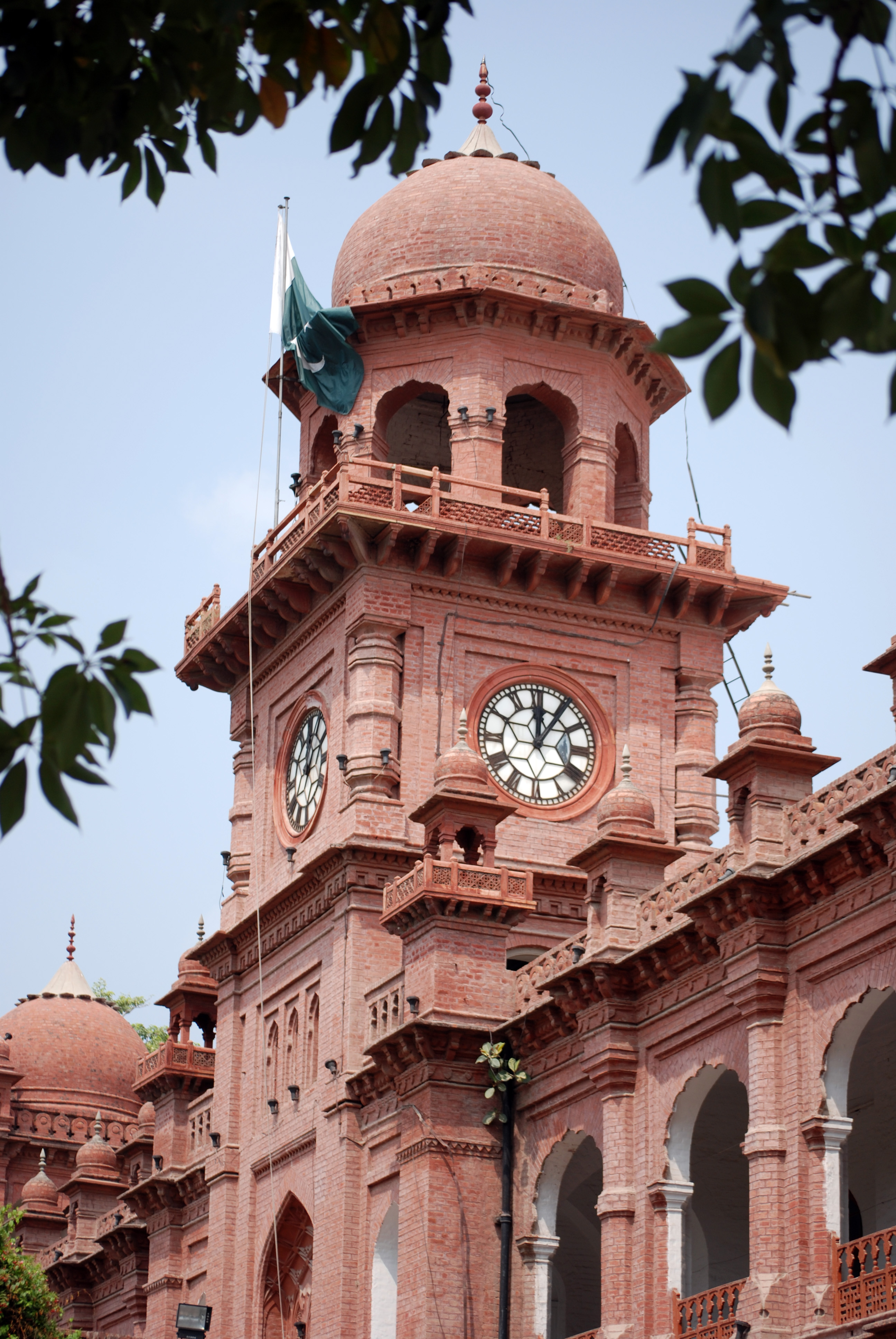
University of the Punjab, Lahore

=== British conquest and organisation ===
None of the territory of modern Pakistan was ruled by the British, or other European powers, until 1839, when Karachi, then a small fishing village with a mud fort guarding the harbour, was taken, and held as an enclave with a port and military base for the First Afghan War that soon followed. The rest of Sindh was taken in 1843, and in the following decades, first the East India Company, and then after the post-Sepoy Mutiny (1857–1858) direct rule of Queen Victoria of the British Empire, took over most of the country partly through wars, and also treaties. The main wars were that against the Baloch Talpur dynasty, ended by the Battle of Miani (1843) in Sindh, the Anglo-Sikh Wars (1845–1849) and the Anglo-Afghan Wars (1839–1919). By 1893, all modern Pakistan was part of the British Indian Empire, and remained so until independence in 1947.

Under the British, modern Pakistan was mostly divided into the Sind Division, Punjab Province, and the Baluchistan Agency. There were various princely states, of which the largest was Bahawalpur. Sindh was part of the Bombay Presidency, and there were many complaints over the years that it was neglected by its distant rulers in modern Mumbai, although there was usually a Commissioner based in Karachi.

The Punjab (which included the modern Indian state) was instead technically ruled from even more distant Calcutta, as part of the Bengal Presidency, but in practice most matters were devolved to local British officials, who were often among the most energetic and effective in India. At first there was a "Board of Administration" led by Sir Henry Lawrence, who had previously worked as British Resident at the Lahore Durbar and also consisted of his younger brother John Lawrence and Charles Grenville Mansel. Below the Board worked a group of acclaimed officers collectively known as Henry Lawrence's "Young Men". After the Mutiny, Sir John Lawrence became the first Governor of Punjab. The Punjab Canal Colonies were an ambitious and largely successful project, begun in the 1880s, to create new farmland through irrigation, to relieve population pressure elsewhere (most of the areas involved are now in Pakistan).

The Baluchistan Agency largely consisted of princely states and tribal territories, and was governed with a light touch, although near the Afghan border Quetta was built up as a military base, in case of invasion by either the Afghans or the Russians. The 1935 Quetta earthquake was a major disaster. From 1876 the sensitive far north was made a "Chief Commissioner's Province". The border with Afghanistan, which remains the modern border of Pakistan, was finally fixed on the Durand Line in 1893.

Railway construction began in the 1850s, and most of the network (some now discontinued) was completed by 1900. Karachi expanded enormously under British rule, followed to a lesser extent by Lahore and the other larger cities.

Different regions of modern Pakistan were conquered by East India Company as below:
•Sindh was conquered by Battle of Hyderabad and Battle of Miani in 1843.
•Punjab and eastern Khyber Pakhtunkhwa were conquered during Second Anglo-Sikh War in 1849.

Regions conquered by British Raj are as below:
•Southern Balochistan came under control by Treaty of Kalat in 1876.
•Western Balochistan was conquered by British empire in Second Anglo-Afghan War through Treaty of Gandamak, in 1879.

=== Early period of Pakistan Movement ===
In 1877, Syed Ameer Ali had formed the Central National Muhammadan Association to work towards the political advancement of the Indian Muslims, who had suffered grievously in 1857, in the aftermath of the failed Sepoy Mutiny against the East India Company; the British were seen as foreign invaders. But the organisation declined towards the end of the 19th century.

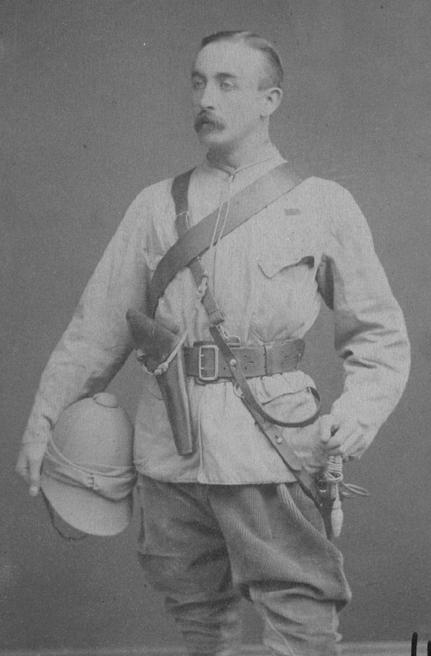
Lord Minto met with the Muslim delegation in June 1906. The Minto-Morley Reforms of 1909 called for separate Muslim electorates.

In 1885, the Indian National Congress was founded as a forum, which later became a party, to promote a nationalist cause. Although the Congress attempted to include the Muslim community in the struggle for independence from the British rule – and some Muslims were very active in the Congress – the majority of Muslim leaders, including the influential Sir Syed Ahmed Khan, did not trust the party.

A turning point came in 1900, when the British administration in the United Provinces of Agra and Oudh acceded to Hindu demands and made Hindi, the version of the Hindustani language written in the Devanagari script, the official language. The proselytisation conducted in the region by the activists of Arya Samaj, a Hindu reformist movement also stirred Muslim concerns about their faith. Eventually, the Muslims feared that the Hindu majority would seek to suppress the rights of Muslims in the region following the departure of the British.

=== Muslim League ===
The All-India Muslim League was founded by Shaiiq-e-Mustafa on 30 December 1906, in the aftermath of division of Bengal, on the sidelines of the annual All India Muhammadan Educational Conference in Shahbagh, Dhaka East Bengal. The meeting was attended by three thousand delegates and presided over by Nawab Viqar-ul-Mulk. It addressed the issue of safeguarding interests of Muslims and finalised a programme. A resolution, moved by Nawab Salimullah and seconded by Hakim Ajmal Khan. Nawab Viqar-ul-Mulk (conservative), declared:

The Musalmans are only a fifth in number as compared with the total population of the country, and it is manifest that if at any remote period the British government ceases to exist in India, then the rule of India would pass into the hands of that community which is nearly four times as large as ourselves ... our life, our property, our honour, and our faith will all be in great danger, when even now that a powerful British administration is protecting its subjects, we the Musalmans have to face most serious difficulties in safe-guarding our interests from the grasping hands of our neighbors.

The constitution and principles of the League were contained in the Green Book, written by Maulana Mohammad Ali. Its goals at this stage did not include establishing an independent Muslim state, but rather concentrated on protecting Muslim liberties and rights, promoting understanding between the Muslim community and other Indians, educating the Muslim and Indian community at large on the actions of the government, and discouraging violence. However, several factors over the next thirty years, including sectarian violence, led to a re-evaluation of the League's aims. Among those Muslims in the Congress who did not initially join the League was Jinnah, a prominent statesman and barrister in Bombay. This was because the first article of the League's platform was "To promote among the Mussalmans (Muslims) of India, feelings of loyalty to the British Government". The League remained loyal to the British administration for five years until the British decided to reverse the partition of Bengal. The Muslim League saw this British decision as partial to Hindus.

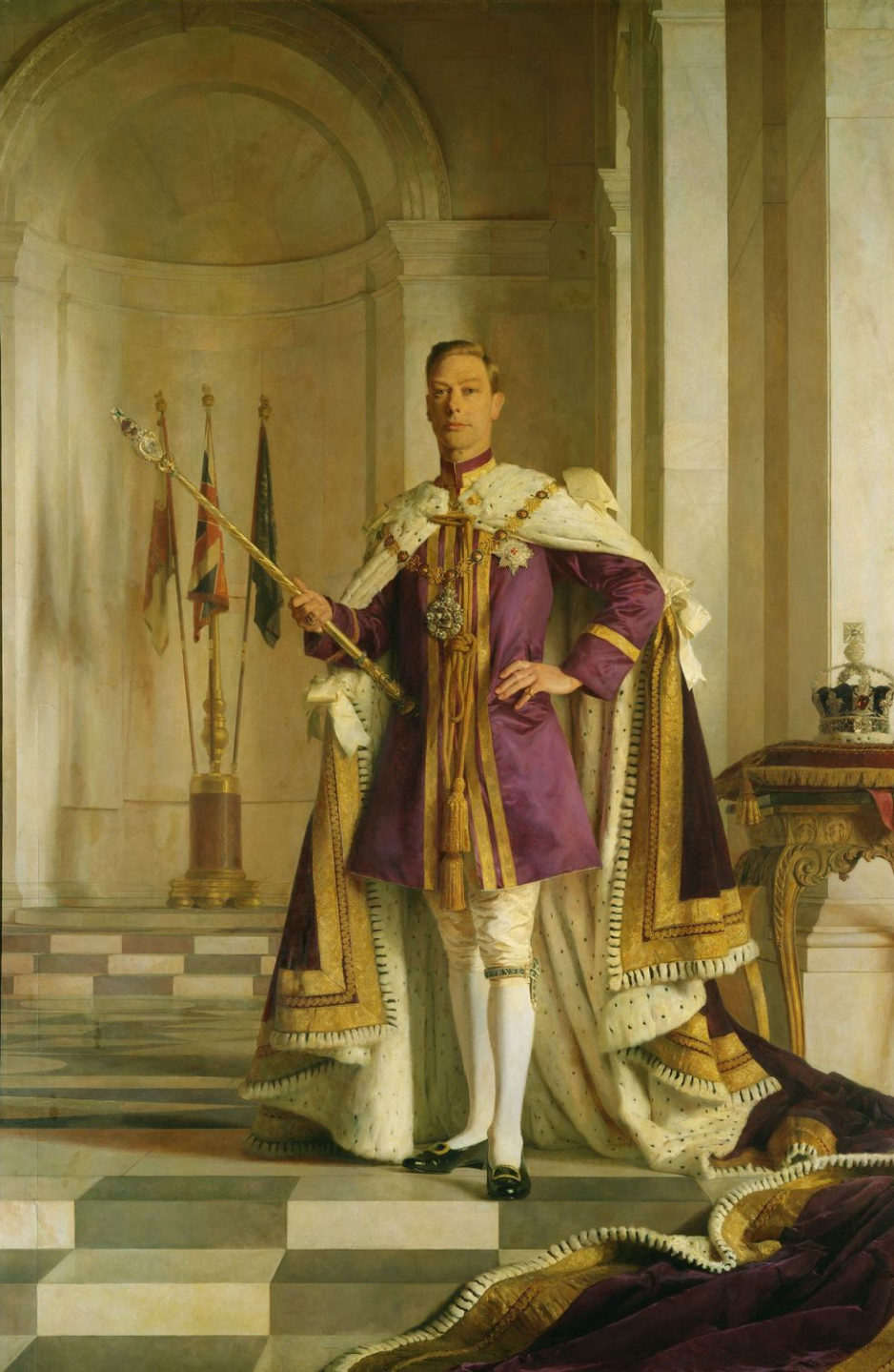
George VI, Emperor of India

In 1907, a vocal group of Hindu hard-liners within the Indian National Congress movement separated from it and started to pursue a pro-Hindu movement openly. This group was spearheaded by the famous triumvirate of Lal-Bal-Pal – Lala Lajpat Rai, Bal Gangadhar Tilak and Bipin Chandra Pal of Punjab, Bombay and Bengal provinces respectively. Their influence spread rapidly among other like-minded Hindus – they called it Hindu nationalism – and it became a cause of serious concern for Muslims.

However, Jinnah did not join the League until 1913, when the party changed its platform to one of Indian independence, as a reaction against the British decision to reverse the 1905 Partition of Bengal, which the League regarded it as a betrayal of the Bengali Muslims. After vociferous protests of the Hindu population and violence engineered by secret groups, such as Anushilan Samiti and its offshoot Jugantar of Aurobindo and his brother etc., the British had decided to reunite Bengal again. Till this stage, Jinnah believed in Mutual co-operation to achieve an independent, united 'India', although he argued that Muslims should be guaranteed one-third of the seats in any Indian Parliament.

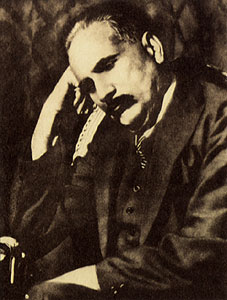
Allama Sir Muhammad Iqbal

The League gradually became the leading representative body of Indian Muslims. Jinnah became its president in 1916, and negotiated the Lucknow Pact with the Congress leader, Bal Gangadhar Tilak, by which Congress conceded the principle of separate electorates and weighted representation for the Muslim community. However, Jinnah broke with the Congress in 1920 when the Congress leader, Mohandas Gandhi, launched a law violating Non-Cooperation Movement against the British, which a temperamentally law-abiding barrister Jinnah disapproved. Jinnah also became convinced that the Congress would renounce its support for separate electorates for Muslims, which indeed it did in 1928. In 1927, the British proposed a constitution for India as recommended by the Simon Commission, but they failed to reconcile all parties. The British then turned the matter over to the League and the Congress, and in 1928 an All-Parties Conference was convened in Delhi. The attempt failed, but two more conferences were held, and at the Bombay conference in May, it was agreed that a small committee should work on the constitution. The prominent Congress leader Motilal Nehru headed the committee, which included two Muslims, Syed Ali Imam and Shoaib Quereshi; Motilal's son, Pt Jawaharlal Nehru, was its secretary. The League, however, rejected the committee's report, the so-called Nehru Report, arguing that its proposals gave too little representation (one quarter) to Muslims – the League had demanded at least one-third representation in the legislature. Jinnah announced a "parting of the ways" after reading the report, and relations between the Congress and the League began to sour.

=== Muslim homeland – "Now or Never" ===
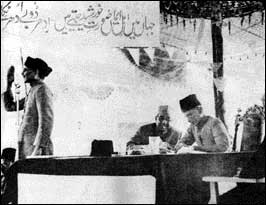
Chaudhry Khaliquzzaman seconding the Resolution with Jinnah and Ali Khan presiding the session

The general elections held in the United Kingdom had already weakened the leftist Labour Party led by Prime Minister Ramsay MacDonald. Furthermore, the Labour Party's government was already weakened by the outcomes of World War I, which fuelled new hopes for progress towards self-government in British India. In fact, Mohandas K. Gandhi travelled to London to press the idea of "self-government" in British India, and claimed to represent all Indians whilst duly criticising the Muslim League as being sectarian and divisive. After reviewing the report of the Simon Commission, the Indian Congress initiated a massive Civil Disobedience Movement under Gandhi; the Muslim League reserved their opinion on the Simon Report declaring that the report was not final and the matters should be decided after consultations with the leaders representing all communities in India.

The Round-table Conferences were held, but these achieved little, since Gandhi and the League were unable to reach a compromise. Witnessing the events of the Round Table Conferences, Jinnah had despaired of politics and particularly of getting mainstream parties like the Congress to be sensitive to minority priorities. During this time in 1930, notable writer and poet, Muhammad Iqbal called for a separate and autonomous nation-state, who in his presidential address to the 1930 convention of the Muslim League said that he felt that a separate Muslim state was essential in an otherwise Hindu-dominated South Asia.

India is a continent of human groups belonging to different races, speaking different languages, and professing different religions [...] Personally, I would like to see the Punjab, North-West Frontier Province, Sind and Baluchistan amalgamated into a single state. Self-government within the British Empire, or without the British Empire, the formation of a consolidated North-West Indian Muslim State appears to me to be the final destiny of the Muslims, at least of North-West India.

— Muhammad Iqbal, Allahabad Address

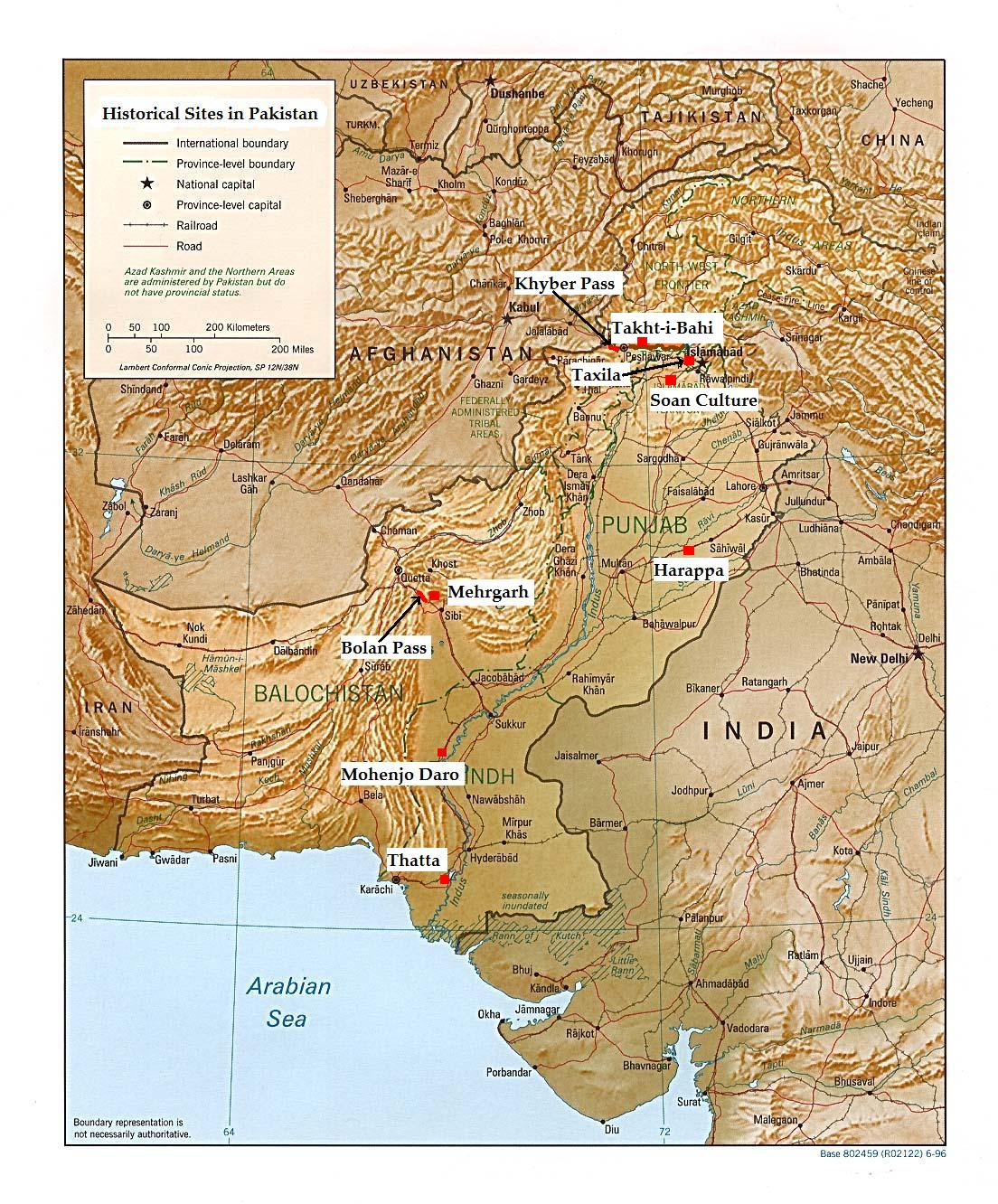
Dream of Iqbal and Ali's Now or Never idealised the merger of the four provinces into a nation-state, called Pakistan.

The name of the nation-state was coined by the Cambridge University's political science student and Muslim nationalist Rahmat Ali, and was published on 28 January 1933 in the pamphlet Now or Never. After coining the name of the nation-state, Ali noticed that there is an acronym formed from the names of the "homelands" of Muslims in northwest India:

- "P" for Punjab
- "A" for Afghania (now known as Khyber Pakhtunkhwa)
- "K" for Kashmir
- "S" for Sindh
- "Tan" for Balochistan; thus forming "Pakistan".

After the publication of the pamphlet, the Hindu Press vehemently criticised it, and the word 'Pakstan' used in it. Thus this word became a heated topic of debate. With the addition of an "i" to improve the pronunciation, the name of Pakistan grew in popularity and led to the commencement of the Pakistan Movement, and consequently the creation of Pakistan. In Urdu and Persian languages, the name encapsulates the concept of Pak ("pure") and stan ("land") and hence a "Pure Land". In 1935, the British government proposed to hand over substantial power to elected Indian provincial legislatures, with elections to be held in 1937. After the elections the League took office in Bengal and Punjab, but the Congress won office in most of the other provinces, and refused to devolve power with the League in provinces with large Muslim minorities citing technical difficulties. The subsequent Congress Rule was unpopular among Muslims and seen as a reign of Hindu tyranny by Muslim leaders. Mohammad Ali Jinnah declared 22 December 1939, a "Day of Deliverance" for Indian Muslims. It was meant to celebrate the resignation of all members of the Congress party from provincial and central offices.

Meanwhile, Muslim ideologues for independence also felt vindicated by the presidential address of V.D. Savarkar at the 19th session of the famous Hindu nationalist party Hindu Mahasabha in 1937. In it, this legendary revolutionary – popularly called Veer Savarkar and known as the iconic father of the Hindu fundamentalist ideology – propounded the seminal ideas of his Two Nation Theory or ethnic exclusivism, which influenced Jinnah profoundly.

=== 1940 Resolution ===
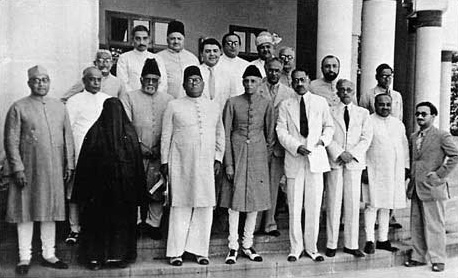
The Working Committee of the Muslim League in Lahore (1940)

In 1940, Jinnah called a general session of the Muslim League in Lahore to discuss the situation that had arisen due to the outbreak of World War II and the Government of India joining the war without consulting Indian leaders. The meeting was also aimed at analysing the reasons that led to the defeat of the Muslim League in the general election of 1937 in the Muslim majority provinces. In his speech, Jinnah criticised the Indian Congress and the nationalists, and espoused the Two-Nation Theory and the reasons for the demand for separate homelands. Sikandar Hayat Khan, the Chief Minister of Punjab, drafted the original resolution, but disavowed the final version, that had emerged after protracted redrafting by the Subject Committee of the Muslim League. The final text unambiguously rejected the concept of a United India because of increasing inter-religious violence and recommended the creation of independent states. The resolution was moved in the general session by Shere-Bangla Bengali nationalist, AKF Haq, the Chief Minister of Bengal, supported by Chaudhry Khaliquzzaman and other leaders and was adopted on 23 March 1940. The Resolution read as follows:

No constitutional plan would be workable or acceptable to the Muslims unless geographical contiguous units are demarcated into regions which should be so constituted with such territorial readjustments as may be necessary. That the areas in which the Muslims are numerically in majority as in the North-Western and Eastern zones of India should be grouped to constitute independent states in which the constituent units shall be autonomous and sovereign ... That adequate, effective and mandatory safeguards shall be specifically provided in the constitution for minorities in the units and in the regions for the protection of their religious, cultural, economic, political, administrative and other rights of the minorities, with their consultation. Arrangements thus should be made for the security of Muslims where they were in a minority.

=== Final phase of the Pakistan Movement ===
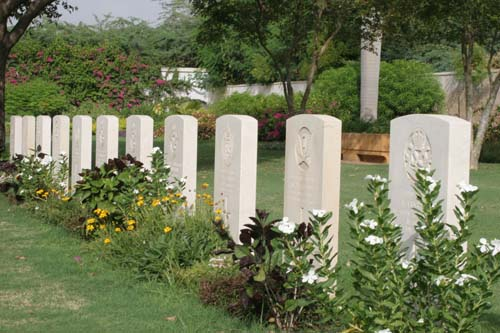
Karachi War Cemetery. About 87,000 soldiers from British India (which includes modern India, Pakistan and Bangladesh) died in World War II. Millions of civilians also died due to famines.

Islamic scholars debated over whether it was possible for the proposed Pakistan to truly become an Islamic state.

While the Congress' top leadership had been in prison following the 1942 Quit India Movement, there was intense debate among Indian Muslims over the creation of a separate homeland. The majority of Barelvis and Barelvi ulema supported the creation of Pakistan and pirs and Sunni ulema were mobilised by the Muslim League to demonstrate that India's Muslim masses wanted a separate country. The Barelvis believed that any co-operation with Hindus would be counter productive. On the other hand, most Deobandis, who were led by Maulana Husain Ahmad Madani, were opposed to the creation of Pakistan and the two-nation theory. According to them Muslims and Hindus could be one nation and Muslims were only a nation of themselves in the religious sense and not in the territorial sense. At the same time some Deobandi ulema such as Maulana Ashraf Ali Thanvi, Mufti Muhammad Shafi and Maulana Shabbir Ahmad Usmani were supportive of the Muslim League's demand to create a separate Pakistan.

Muslims who were living in provinces where they were demographically a minority, such as the United Provinces where the Muslim League enjoyed popular support, were assured by Jinnah that they could remain in India, migrate to Pakistan or continue living in India but as Pakistani citizens.

In the Constituent Assembly elections of 1946, the Muslim League won 425 out of 496 seats reserved for Muslims (polling 89.2% of total votes). The Congress had hitherto refused to acknowledge the Muslim League's claim of being the representative of Indian Muslims but finally acquiesced to the League's claim after the results of this election. The Muslim League's demand for Pakistan had received overwhelming popular support from India's Muslims, especially those Muslims who were living in provinces such as UP where they were a minority.

The British had neither the will, nor the financial resources or military power, to hold India any longer but they were also determined to avoid partition and for this purpose they arranged the Cabinet Mission Plan. According to this plan India would be kept united but would be heavily decentralised with separate groupings of Hindu and Muslim majority provinces. The Muslim League accepted this plan as it contained the 'essence' of Pakistan but the Congress rejected it. After the failure of the Cabinet Mission Plan, Jinnah called for Muslims to observe Direct Action Day to demand the creation of a separate Pakistan. The Direct Action Day morphed into violent riots between Hindus and Muslims in Calcutta, with the violence displaying elements of ethnic cleansing. The riots in Calcutta were followed by intense communal rioting elsewhere, including in Noakhali (where Hindus were attacked by Muslims) and Bihar (where Hindus attacked Muslims) in October, resulting in large-scale displacement. In March 1947, such violence reached Punjab, where Sikhs and Hindus were massacred and driven out by Muslims in the Rawalpindi Division.

The British Prime Minister Attlee appointed Lord Louis Mountbatten as India's last viceroy, to negotiate the independence of Pakistan and India and immediate British withdrawal. British leaders including Mountbatten did not support the creation of Pakistan but failed to convince Jinnah otherwise. Mountbatten later confessed that he would most probably have sabotaged the creation of Pakistan had he known that Jinnah was dying of tuberculosis.

In early 1947, the British had announced their desire to grant India its independence by June 1948. However, Lord Mountbatten decided to advance the date. In a meeting in June, Nehru and Abul Kalam Azad representing the Congress, Jinnah representing the Muslim League, B. R. Ambedkar representing the Untouchable community, and Master Tara Singh representing the Sikhs, agreed to partition India along religious lines.

=== Independence from the British Empire ===
On 14 August 1947, Pakistan gained independence. India gained independence the following day. The two provinces of British India, Punjab and Bengal, were divided along religious lines by the Radcliffe Commission. Mountbatten is alleged to have influenced the Radcliffe Commission to draw the line in India's favour. Punjab's mostly Muslim western part went to Pakistan and its mostly Hindu/Sikh eastern part went to India but there were significant Muslim minorities in Punjab's eastern section and likewise there were many Hindus and Sikhs living in Punjab's western areas.

Intense communal rioting in the Punjab forced the governments of India and Pakistan to agree to a forced population exchange of Muslim and Hindu/Sikh minorities living in Punjab. After this population exchange only a few thousand low-caste Hindus remained in Pakistan's side of Punjab and only a tiny Muslim population remained in the town of Malerkotla in India's part of Punjab. Political scientist Ishtiaq Ahmed says that although Muslims started the violence in Punjab, by the end of 1947 more Muslims had been killed by Hindus and Sikhs in East Punjab than the number of Hindus and Sikhs who had been killed by Muslims in West Punjab.

More than ten million people migrated across the new borders and between 200,000 and 2,000,000 people died in the spate of communal violence in the Punjab in what some scholars have described as a 'retributive genocide' between the religions. The Pakistani government claimed that 50,000 Muslim women were abducted and raped by Hindu and Sikh men and similarly the Indian government claimed that Muslims abducted and raped 33,000 Hindu and Sikh women. The two governments agreed to repatriate abducted women and thousands of Hindu, Sikh and Muslim women were repatriated to their families in the 1950s. The dispute over Kashmir escalated into the first war between India and Pakistan. The conflict remains unresolved.

For the history after independence, see History of Pakistan (1947–present).

== History by region ==
- Azad Jammu & Kashmir
- Balochistan
- East Pakistan
- Gilgit-Baltistan
- Islamabad Capital Territory
- Khyber Pakhtunkhwa
- Punjab
- Sindh

=== By city ===
- Timeline of Karachi
- Timeline of Lahore
- Timeline of Peshawar

== See also ==
- History of Asia
- History of South Asia
- Islam in Pakistan
- Muslim conquest in the Indian subcontinent
- Maritime history of Pakistan
- Politics of Pakistan
