= PNS Shah Jahan (D-186) =

Decommissioned Tariq-class destroyer of the Pakistan Navy

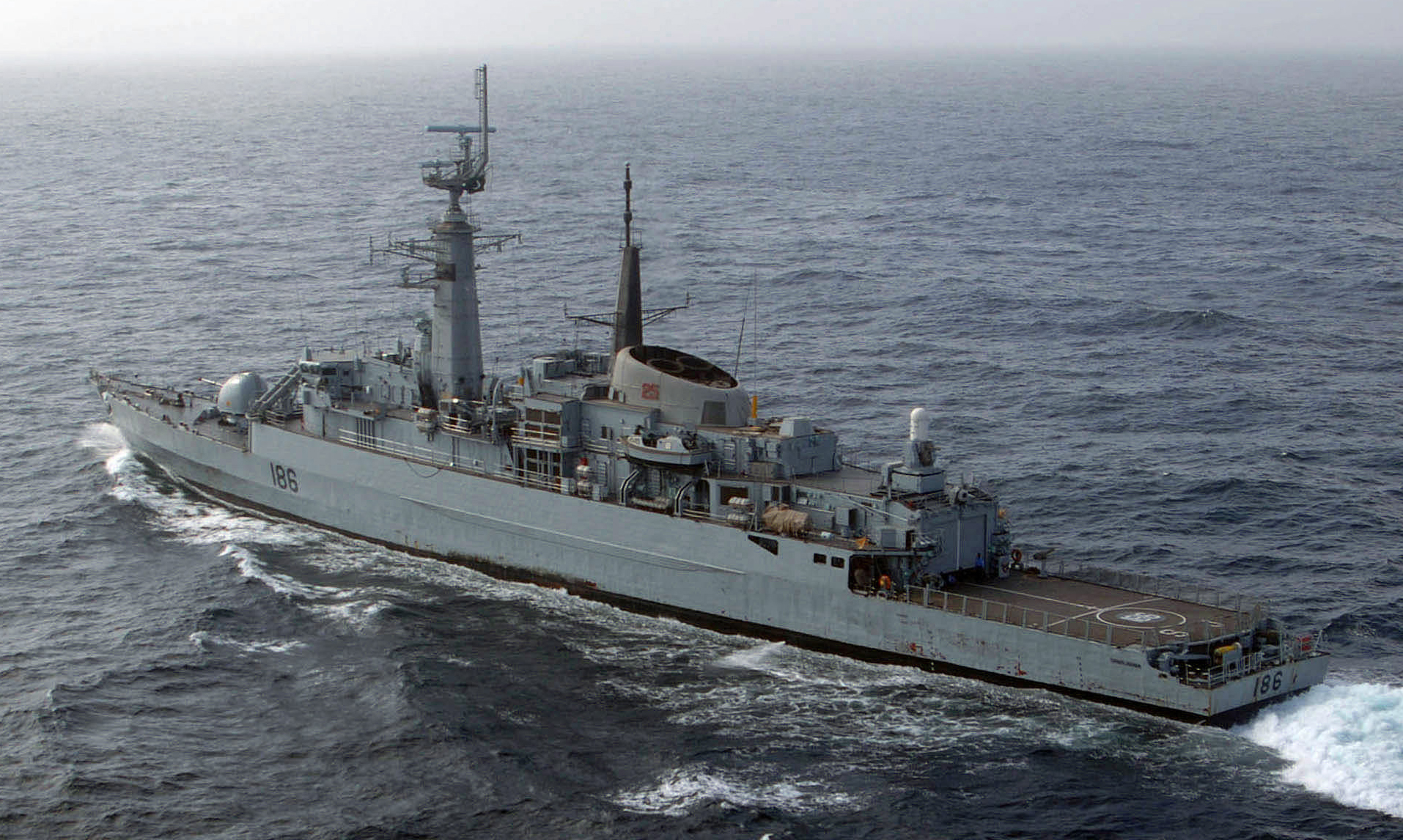
- PNS Shah Jahan in the Indian Ocean in 2002.

History

Pakistan
- Name: PNS Shah Jahan
- Namesake: Shah Jahan
- Builder: Vosper Thornycroft in England
- Laid down: 23 July 1971
- Launched: 23 November 1972
- Recommissioned: 23 September 1994
- In service: 1994–2021
- Out of service: 1 January 2021
- Home port: Naval Base Karachi
- Identification: Pennant number: D-186
- Fate: Sunk as target on 12 January 2021

General characteristics
- Class & type: Tariq-class frigate
- Displacement: 3,700 long tons (3,759 t) full load
- Length: 384 ft (117 m)
- Beam: 41 ft 9 in (12.73 m)
- Draught: 19 ft 6 in (5.94 m)
- Propulsion: COGOG: 2 × Rolls-Royce Olympus gas turbines; 2 × Rolls-Royce Tyne RM1A gas turbines for cruising
- Speed: 32 knots (59 km/h; 37 mph)
- Range: 4,000 nmi (7,400 km; 4,600 mi) at 17 knots (31 km/h; 20 mph)
- Complement: 192, 14 officers, 178 enlisted
- Armament: 1 × Vickers 4.5 in (114 mm)/55 Mk.8 AS/AA gun (25rds/min to 22 km/11.9nmi); 1 × Phalanx CIWS; 2 × triple STWS-1 torpedo launchers (for Mk 46 LWTs); 2 × 4-cell Mk 141 launchers (for Harpoon SSMs); 2 × 20 mm Oerlikon cannon
- Aircraft carried: 1 × Lynx HAS.3 helicopter; 1 × Camcopter S-100 UAV
- Aviation facilities: Flight deck and hangar

PNS Shah Jahan (DDG-186) was a Tariq-class destroyer in service with the Pakistan Navy since being recommissioned in 1994. Based on the British design, Type 21 frigate, she previously served in the Royal Navy as HMS Active as a general purpose frigate.

In 1998–2008, the extensive engineering modernization and midlife upgrade program by the KSEW Ltd. at the Naval Base Karachi reclassified her status as guided missile destroyer.

== Service history ==
She was designed and constructed by the Yarrow Shipbuilders, Ltd. at Glasgow in Scotland, she was laid down on 30 October 1974, and was launched on 19 July 1978. She eventually commissioned on 19 July 1978 in the Surface Fleet of the Royal Navy as HMS Active. During her service with the Royal Navy, she was notable for her wartime operations during the Falklands War with Argentina.

On 3 October 1994, she was purchased by Pakistan after the successful negotiation with the United Kingdom, along with PNS Tippu Sultan.

Upon arriving in Karachi, she underwent an extensive modernization and mid-life upgrade program by the KSEW Ltd. at the Naval Base Karachi in 1998–2002.

Her wartime performance included in deployments in patrolling off the Gulf of Aden, Gulf of Oman, Persian Gulf, Arabian Sea as well as deploying in the Mediterranean Sea when she was part of the multinational CTF-150.

On 12 January 2021, Shah Jahan was sunk as a target by the Pakistan Navy during a live-fire drill in the North Arabian Sea.

== Gallery ==
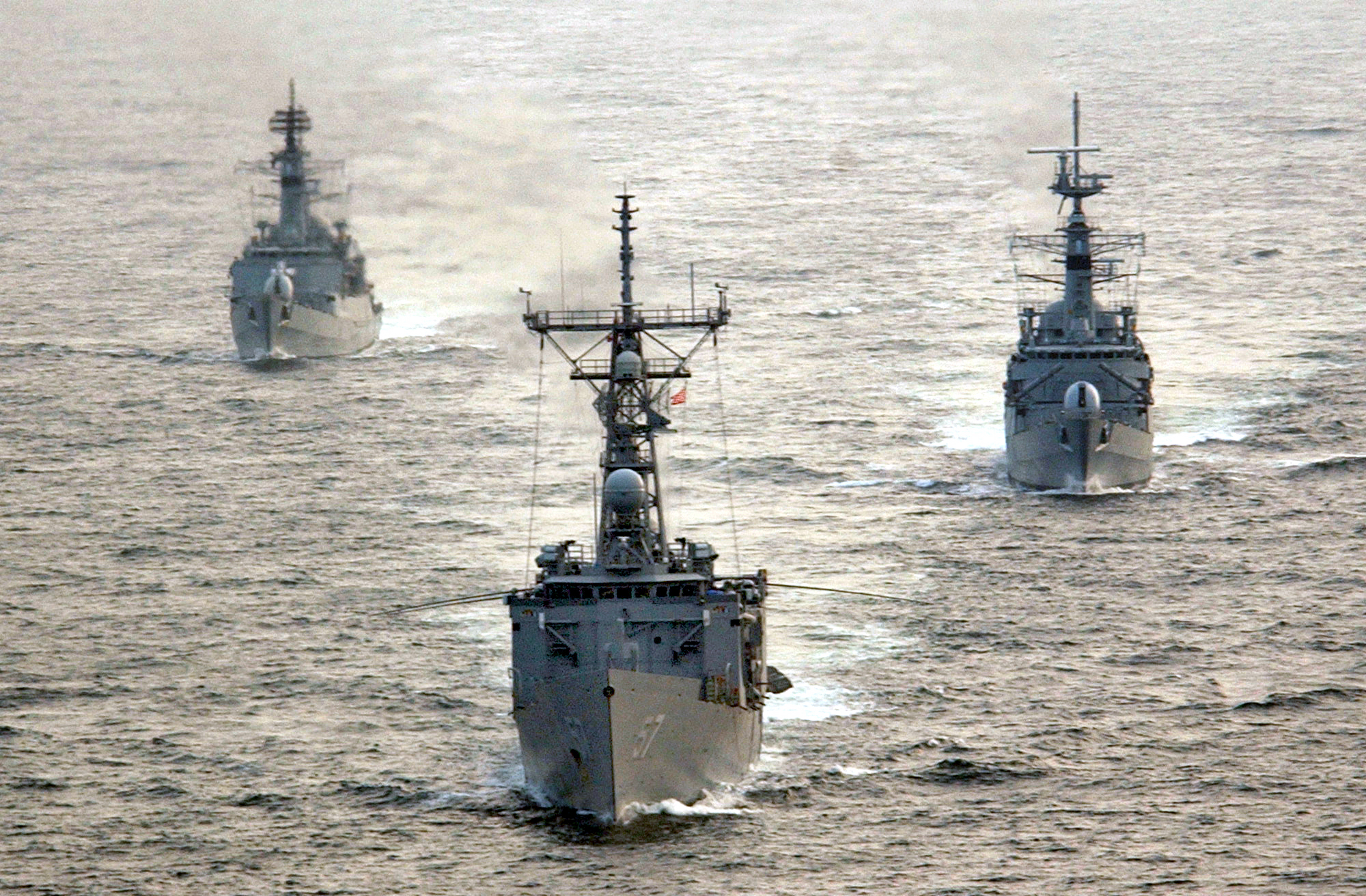
USS Reuben James leads PNS Shahjahan and PNS Tippu Sultan in Exercise Inspired Siren in the Indian Ocean in 2002.

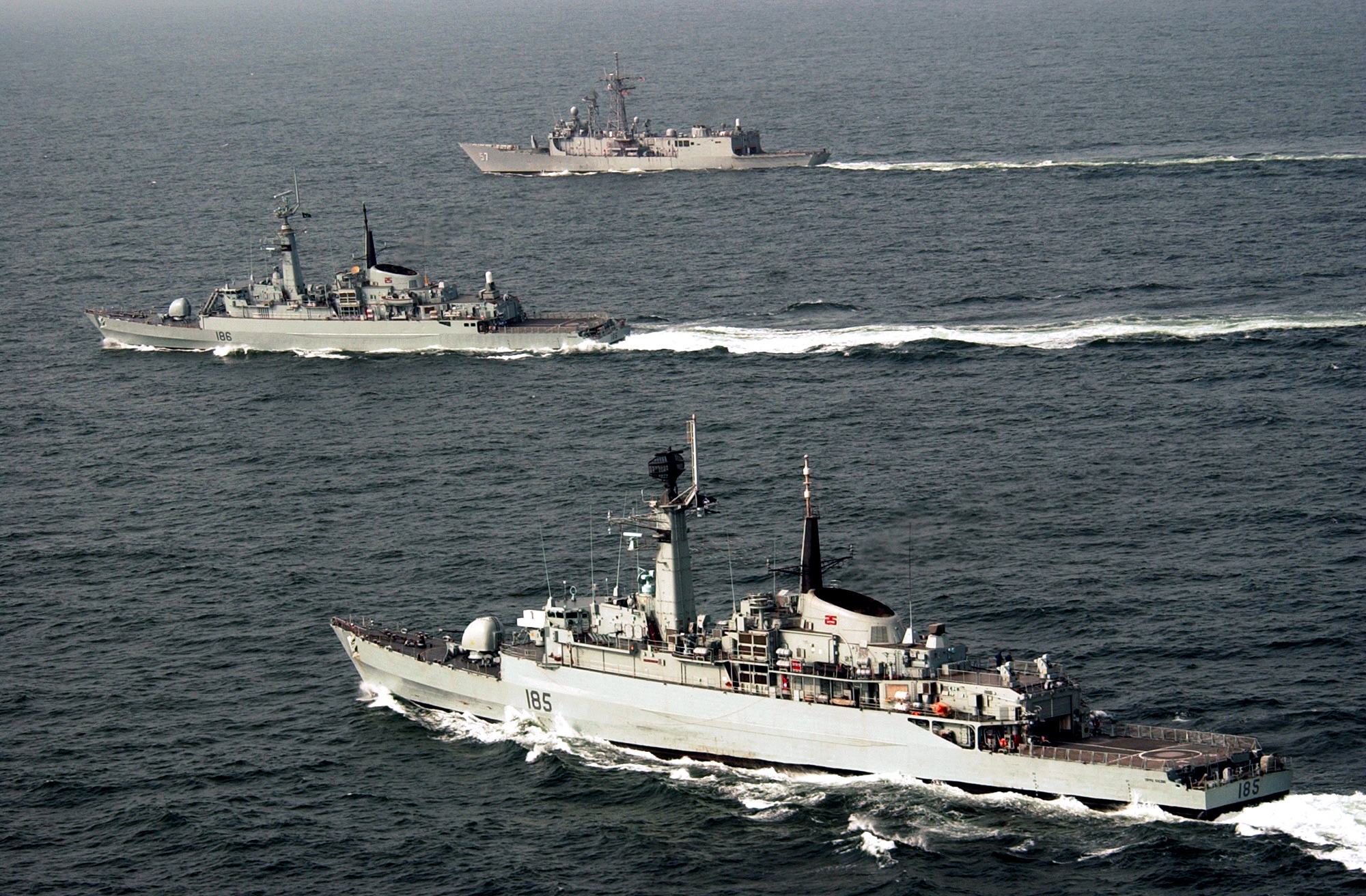
USS Rueben James, PNS Shahjahan and PNS Tippu Sultan in Exercise Inspired Siren in the Indian Ocean in 2002.

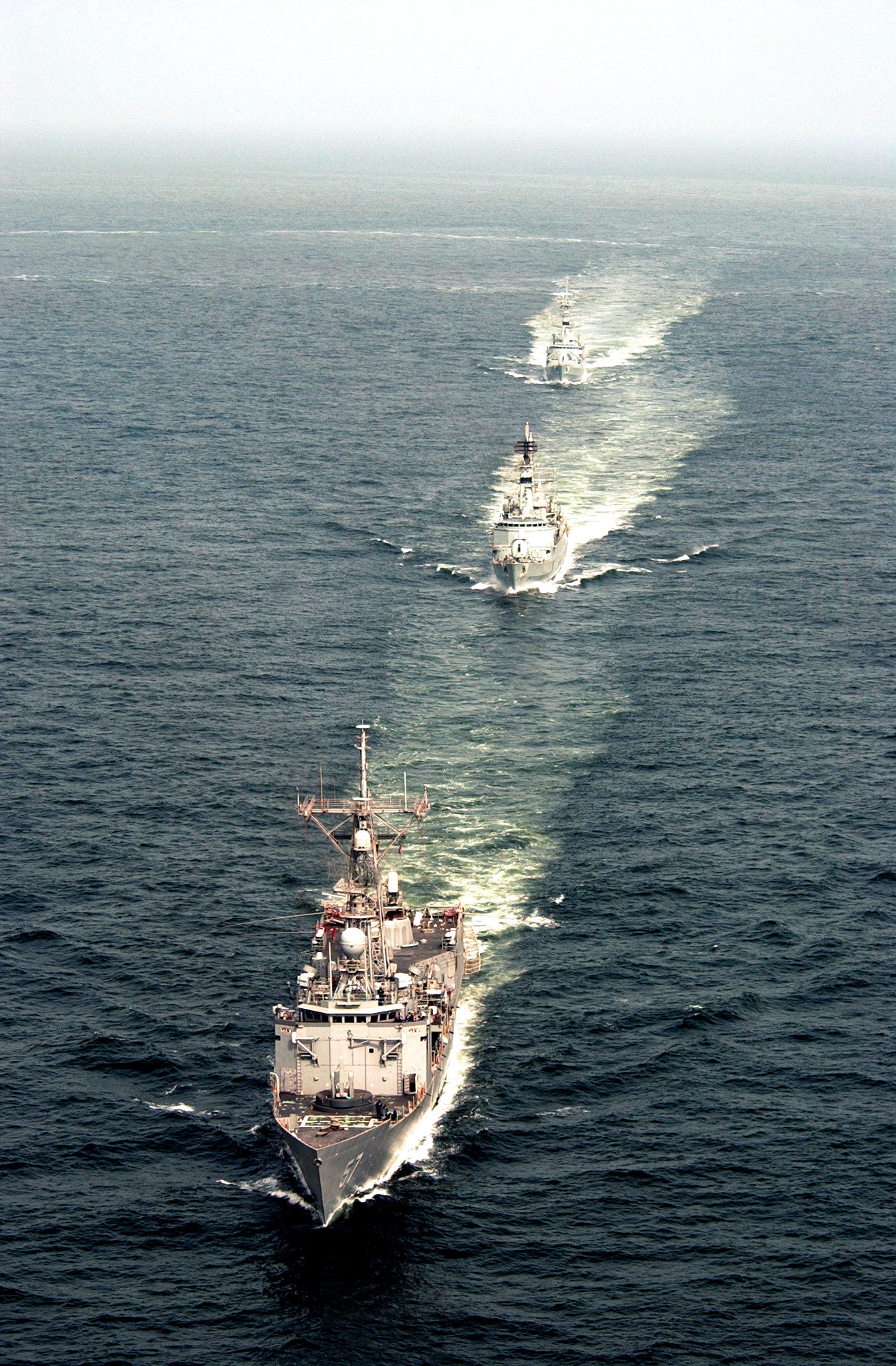
USS Rueben James, PNS Shahjahan and PNS Tippu Sultan in Exercise Inspired Siren in the Indian Ocean in 2002.

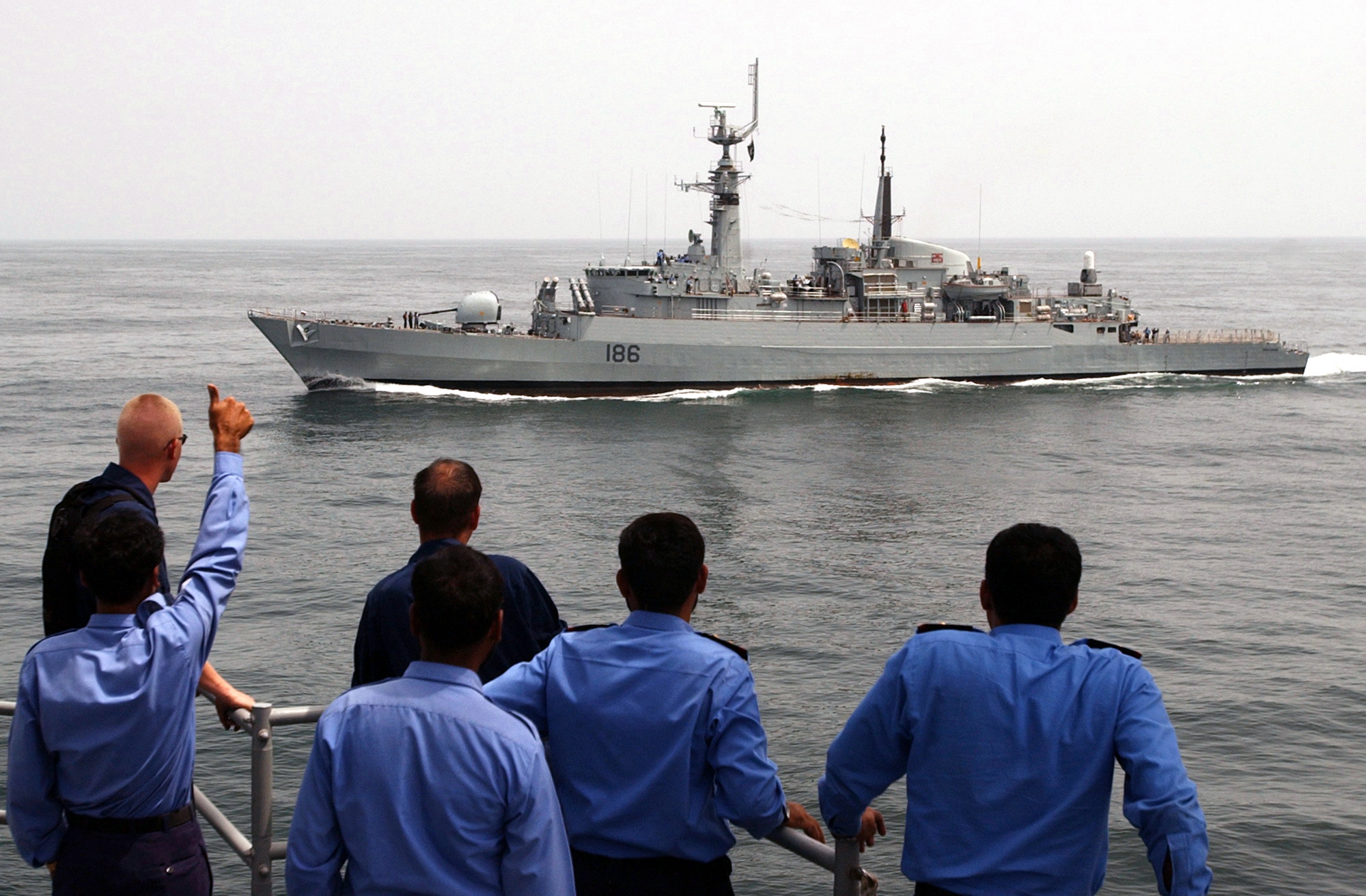
U.S. and Pakistan Navy personnel "Thumbs up" to his shipmates aboard PNS Shah Jahan in the Exercise Inspired Siren in the Indian Ocean in 2002.

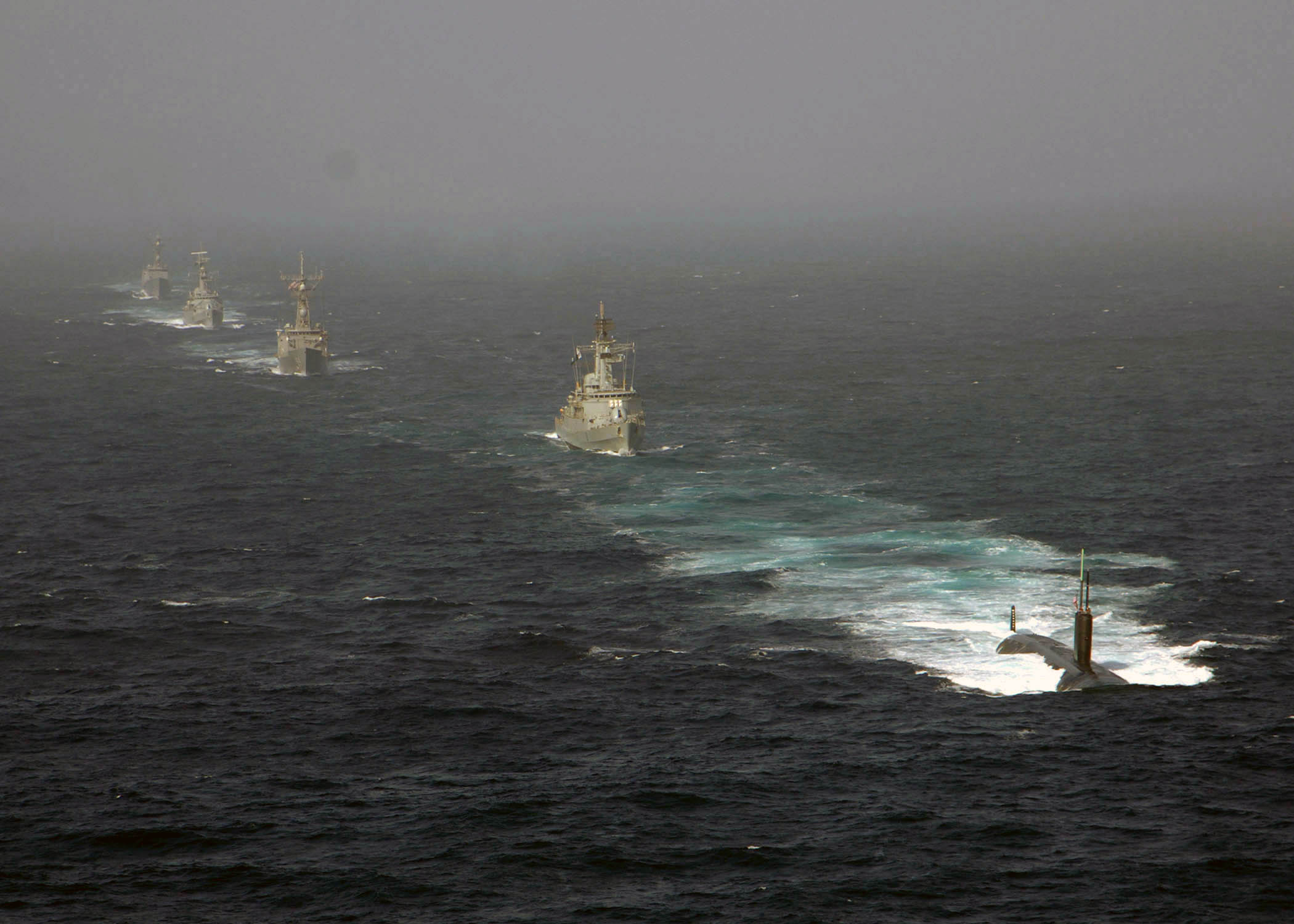
PNS Shahjahan, with PNS Tariq, participating in the Exercise Inspired Siren in the Indian Ocean in 2005.

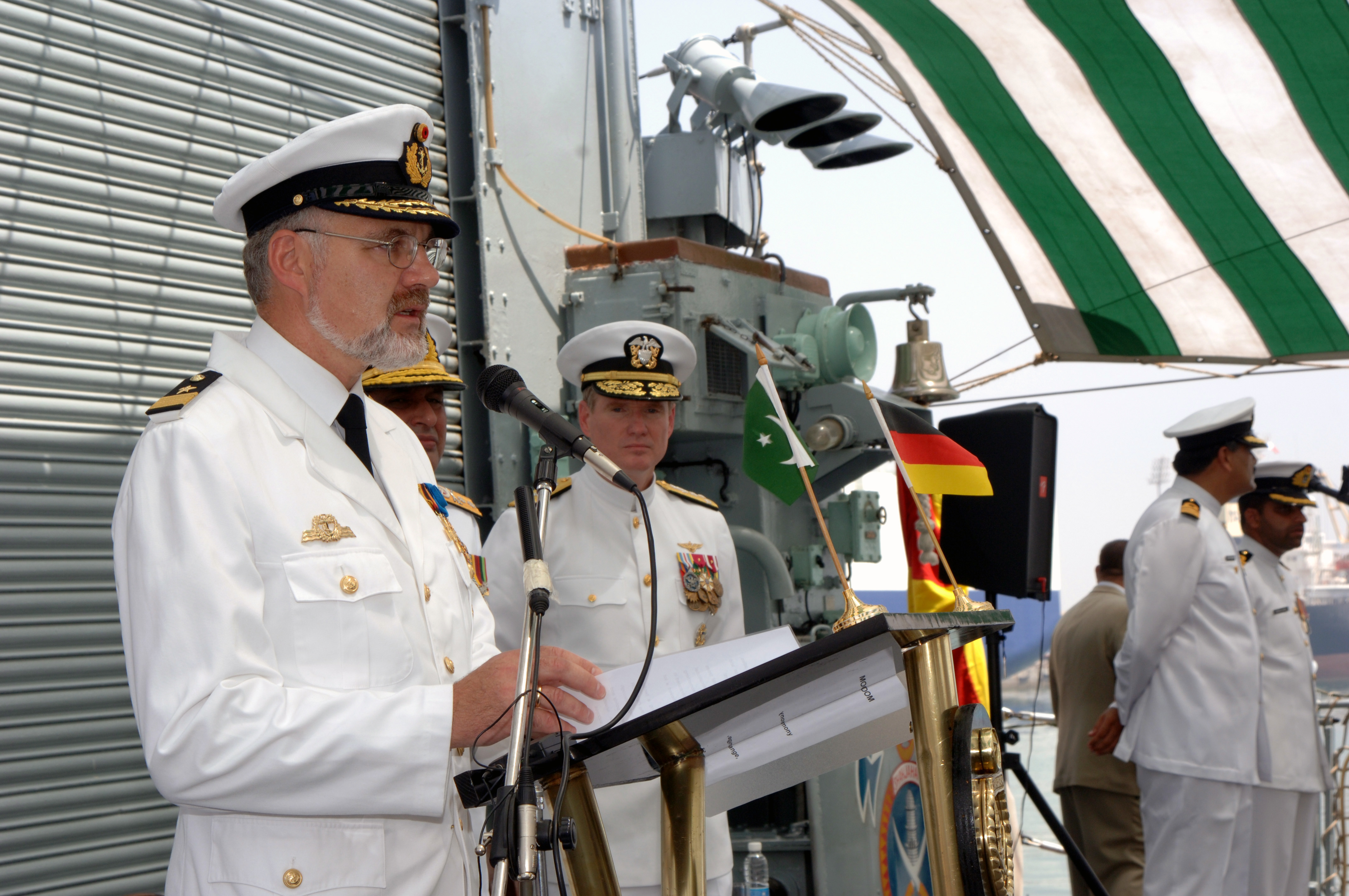
German Navy's Rear Admiral Heinrich Lange speaks during the ceremony held for CTF-151 aboard PNS Shahjahan in 2006.

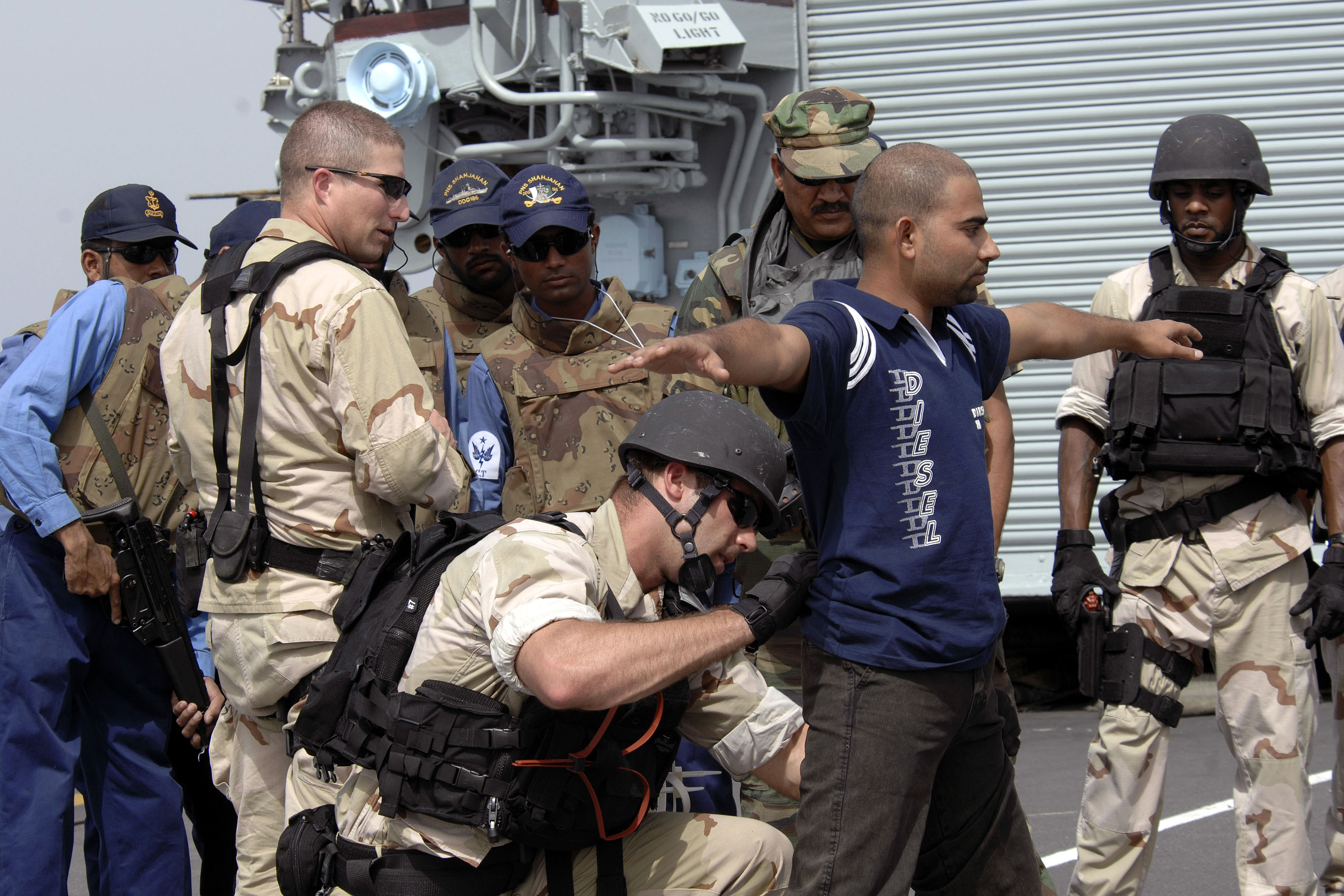
In a mock exercise, U.S. Navy's SEALs with Pakistan SSGN conducting the VBBS drill aboard PNS Shahjahan in the Indian Ocean in 2007.

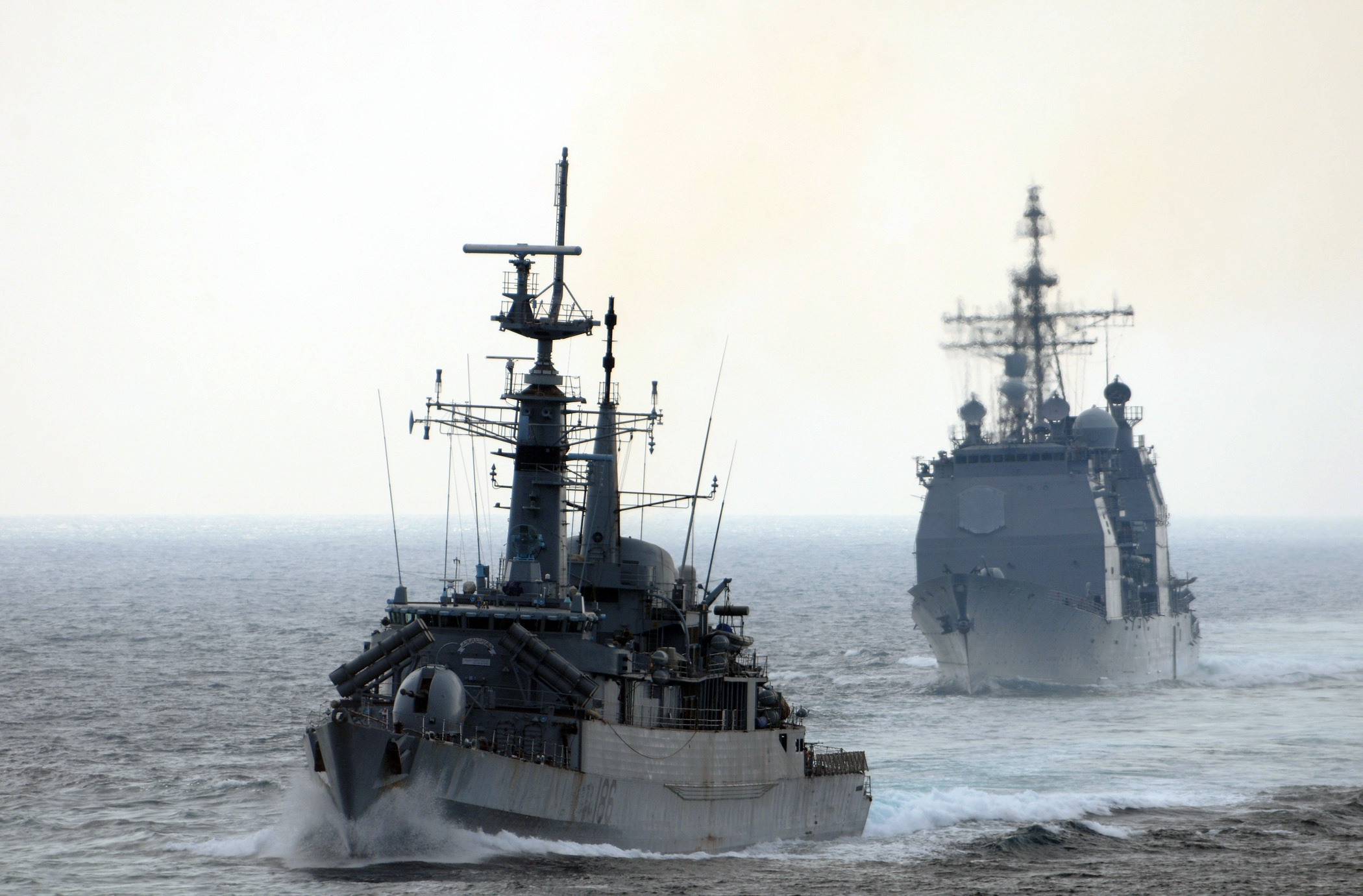
PNS Shahjahan, transiting with USS Mobile Bay in 2011.

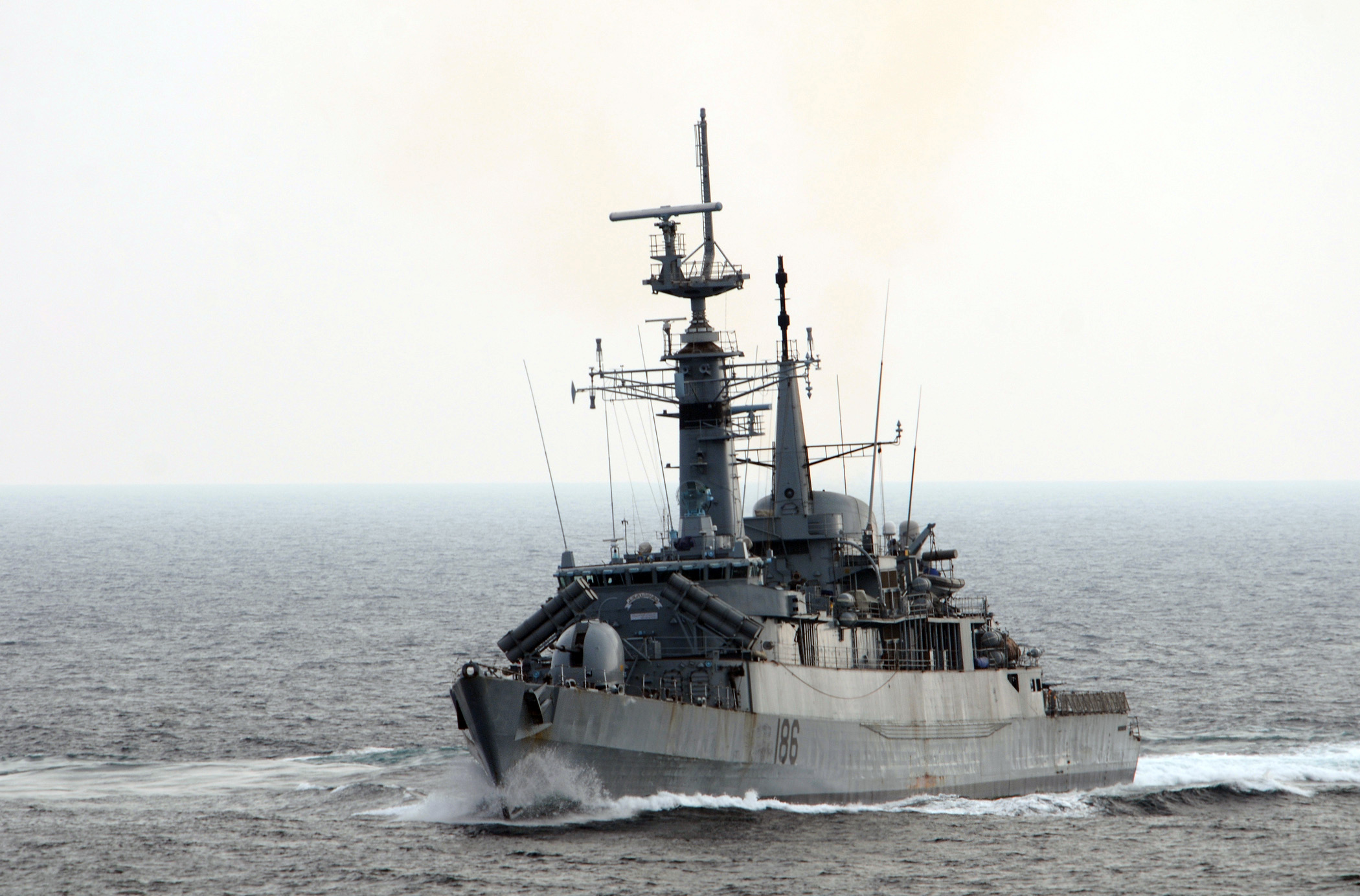
PNS Shah Jahan making manoeuvers in the Indian Ocean in 2011.

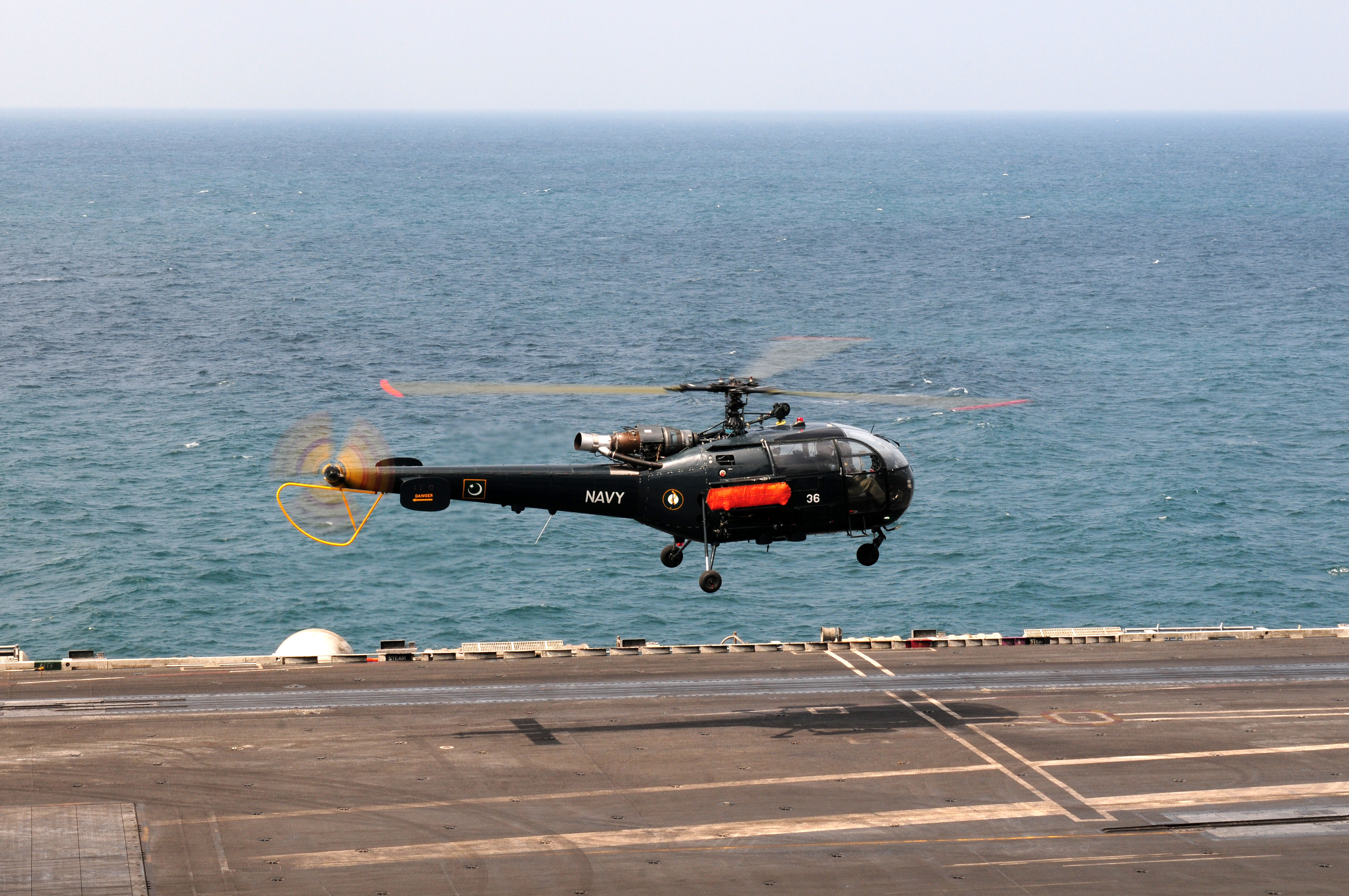
An Alouette III assigned to PNS Shah Jahan lands aboard the aircraft carrier USS George H.W. Bush in 2011.

The torpedo launching system installed in PNS Shah Jahan in 2018.
