= PNS Badr (D-184) =

Decommissioned Tariq-class guided missile destroyer of the Pakistan Navy

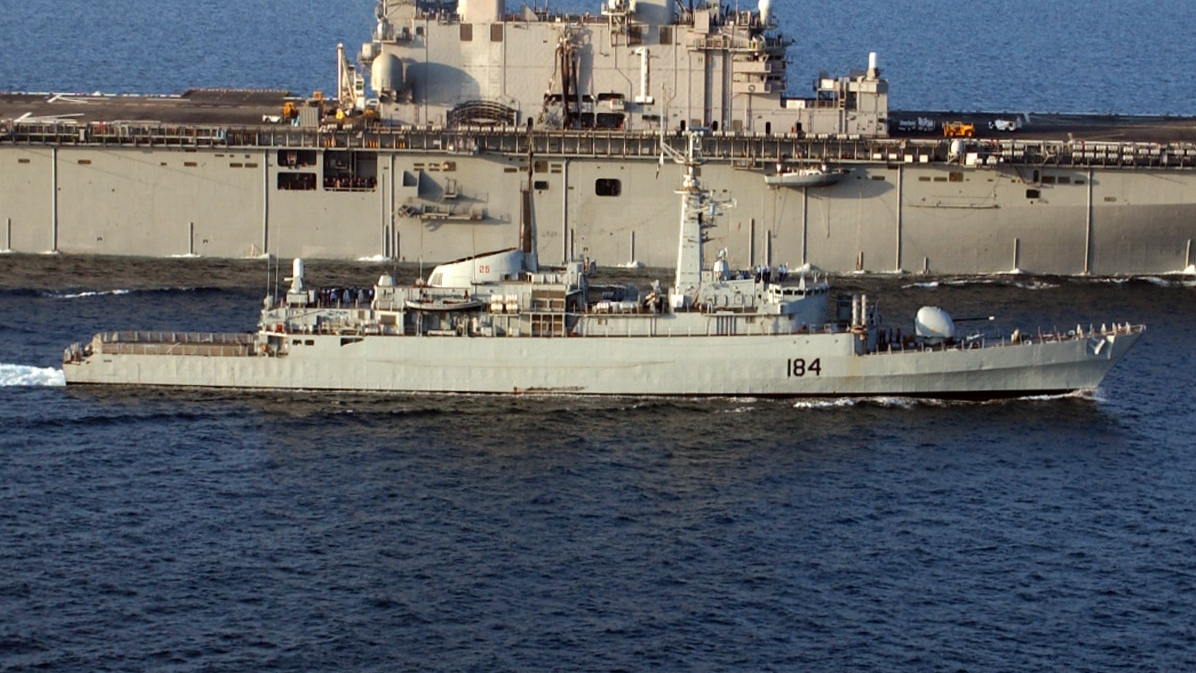
- PNS Badr (D-184) in Northern Persian Gulf in 2005.

History

Pakistan
- Name: PNS Badr
- Namesake: Badr
- Builder: Yarrow Shipbuilders in Scotland
- Laid down: 28 September 1972
- Launched: 18 September 1974
- Acquired: 1 March 1994
- Recommissioned: 26 June 1994
- In service: 1994–2014
- Home port: Naval Base Karachi
- Identification: Pennant number: D-184
- Status: Decommissioned.

General characteristics
- Class & type: Tariq-class destroyer
- Displacement: 3,700 long tons (3,759 t) full load
- Length: 384 ft (117 m)
- Beam: 41 ft 9 in (12.73 m)
- Draught: 19 ft 6 in (5.94 m)
- Propulsion: COGOG: 2 × Rolls-Royce Olympus gas turbines; 2 × Rolls-Royce Tyne RM1A gas turbines for cruising
- Speed: 32 knots (59 km/h; 37 mph)
- Range: 4,000 nmi (7,400 km; 4,600 mi) at 17 knots (31 km/h; 20 mph)
- Complement: 192, 14 officers, 178 enlisted
- Armament: 1 × Vickers 4.5 in (114 mm)/55 Mk.8 AS/AA gun (25rds/min to 22 km/11.9nmi); 1 × Phalanx CIWS; 2 × triple STWS-1 torpedo launchers (for Mk 46 LWTs); 2 × 4-cell Mk 141 launchers (for Harpoon SSMs); 2 × 20 mm Oerlikon cannon
- Aircraft carried: 1 × Lynx HAS.3 helicopter; 1 × Camcopter S-100 UAV
- Aviation facilities: Flight deck and hangar

PNS Badr (D-184) was the Tariq-class destroyer that served in the Surface Command of the Pakistan Navy from 1994 until being decommissioned from the service in 2014.

Before joining the Pakistan Navy, she was formerly designated as HMS Alacrity of the British Royal Navy as a general purpose frigate, and went through an extensive refit and midlife upgrade program by the KSEW Ltd. at the Naval Base Karachi to have mission status to be properly qualified as the destroyer.

== Service history ==
=== Acquisition, construction, and modernization ===
She was designed and constructed by the Yarrow Shipbuilders, Ltd. at Glasgow in Scotland and was laid down on 5 March 1973; eventually, she was launched on 18 September 1974. After a series of sea trials, she was commissioned on 2 July 1977 in the Surface Fleet of the Royal Navy as HMS Alacrity. During her service with the Royal Navy, she was notable for her wartime operations during the Falklands War with Argentina.

On 1 March 1994, she was purchased by Pakistan after the successful negotiation with the United Kingdom and sailed off from Port of Plymouth to the Port of Karachi, arriving on 26 June 1994.

Upon arriving in Karachi, she underwent an extensive modernization and mid-life upgrade program by the KSEW Ltd. at the Naval Base Karachi in 1998–2002.

In 2005, she was deployed to join the expeditionary strike group led by the U.S. Navy to engage in the relief efforts for the earthquake that struck the northern part of the Pakistan on 8 October 2005.

Her wartime performance included in deployments in patrolling off the Horn of Africa, Gulf of Oman, Persian Gulf, Arabian Sea, and Indian Ocean as part of the CTF-150.

In 2014, it was reported that PNS Badr was decommissioned from service.

== Gallery ==
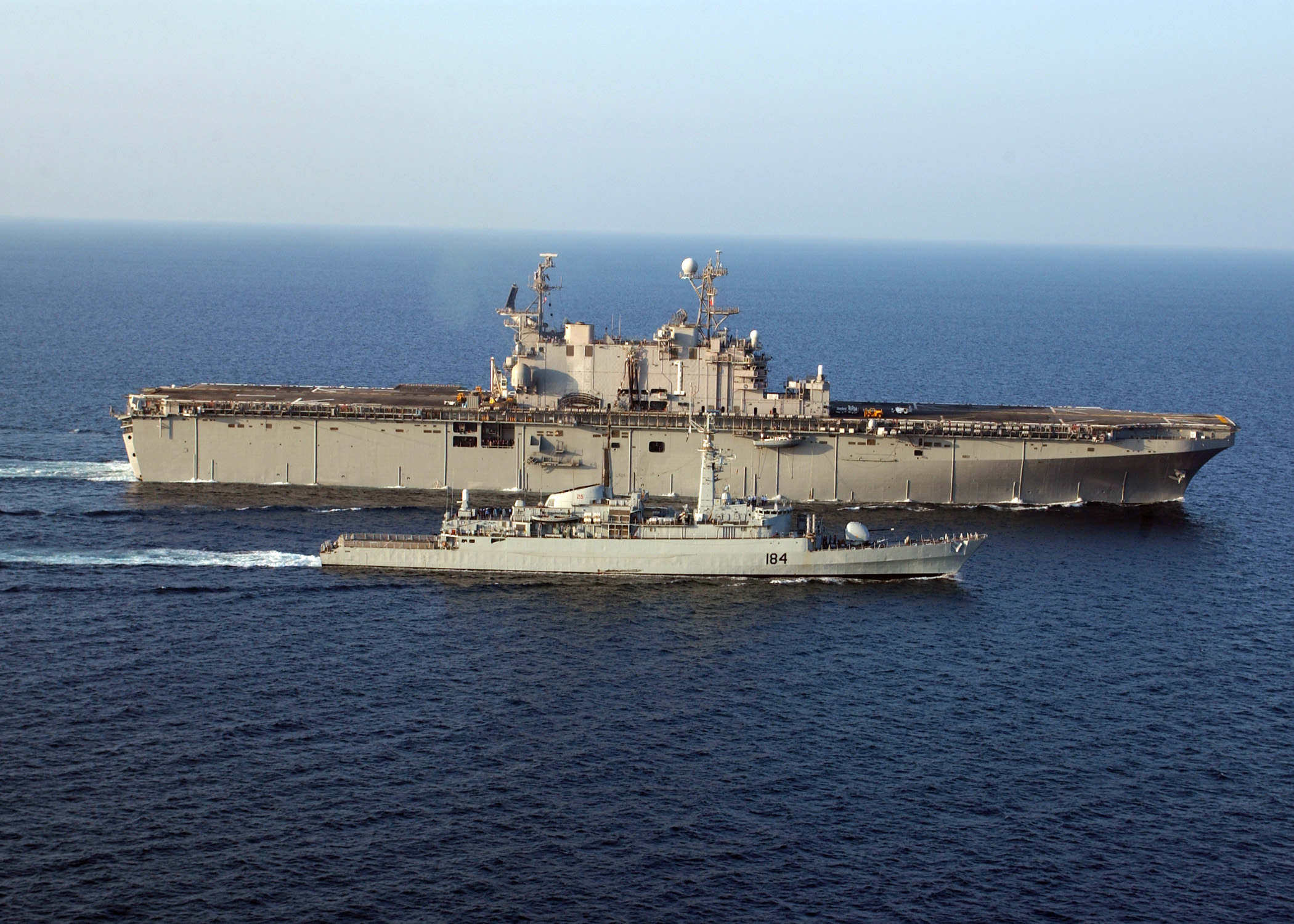
PNS Badr steams alongside USS Tarawa, an amphibious assault ship, in the Northern Persian Gulf, participating in the relief operation for the earthquake that struck the northern part of the Pakistan on 8 October 2005.

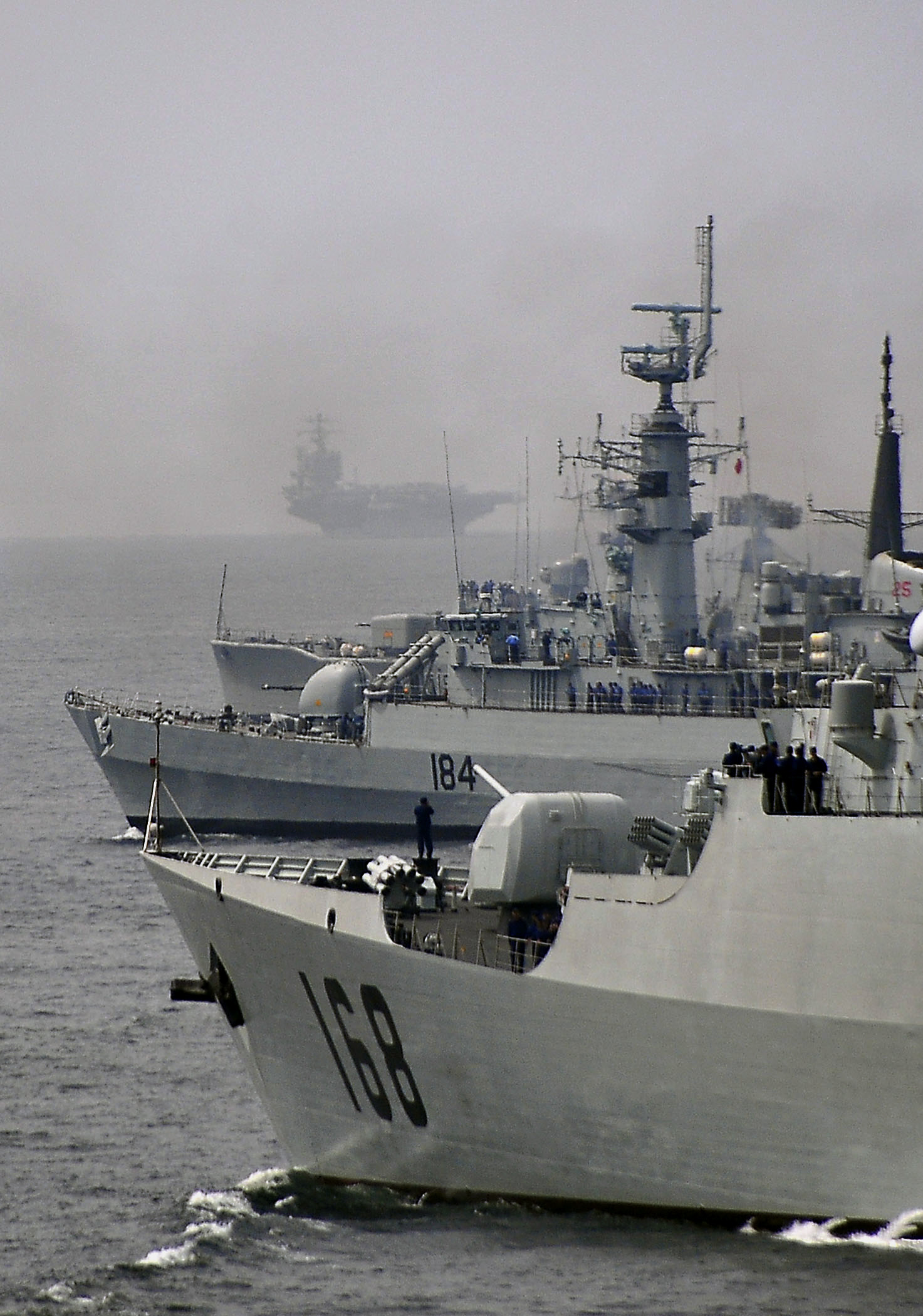
PNS Badr anchored with the Chinese Navy Guangzhou, the American USS Lake Champlain, and USS Theodore Roosevelt (the aircraft carrier in background) during the naval drill, Aman-09, hosted by Pakistan in the Indian Ocean in 2009.

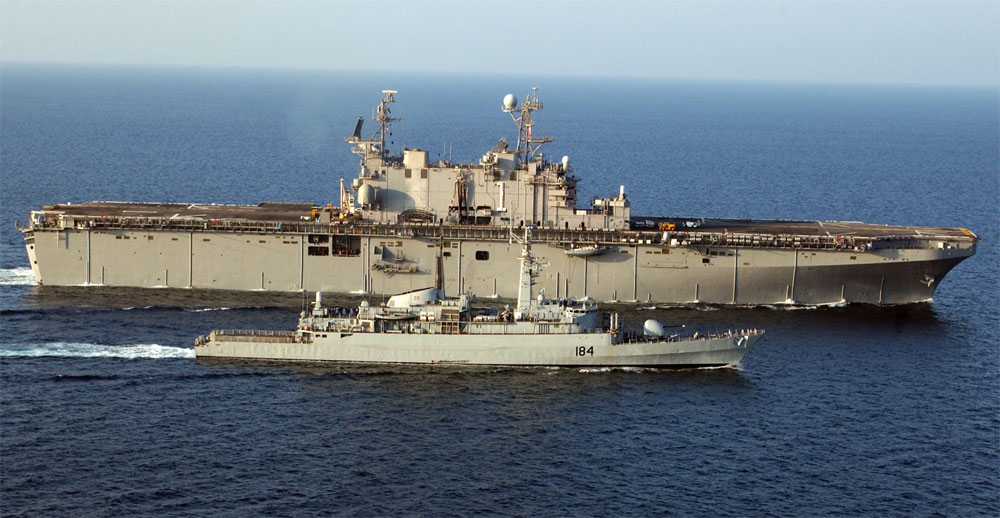
PNS Badr steams alongside USS Tarawa in Northern Persian Gulf to participate in the relief operations in Northern Pakistan in 2005.
