= Tariq-class destroyer =

Class of guided-missile warships that were transferred by the Royal Navy to Pakistan

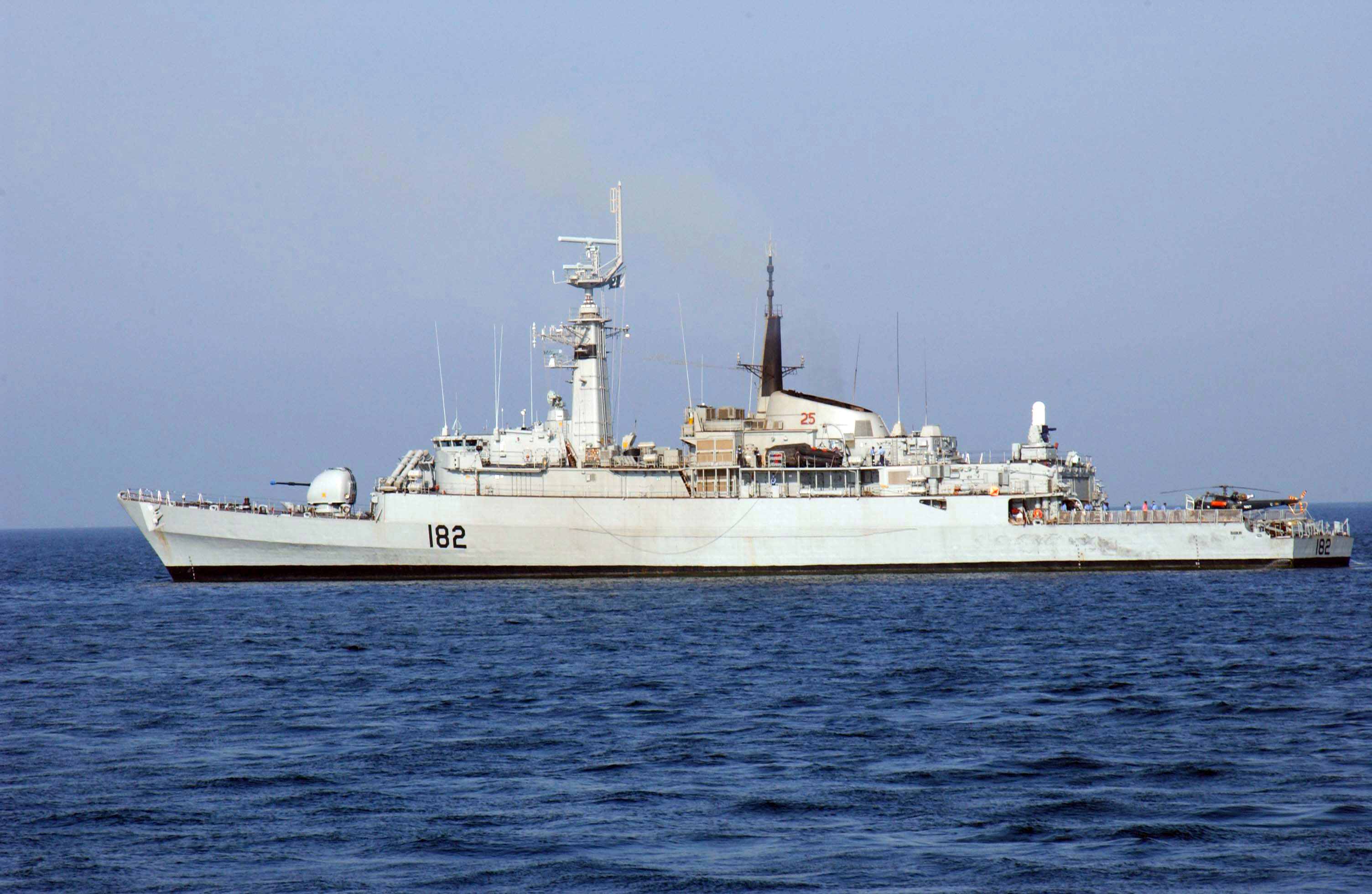
- PNS Babur, a Tariq-class destroyer, in 2004

Class overview
- Name: Tariq class
- Builders: Yarrow, United Kingdom; VT Group, United Kingdom; KSEW Ltd., Pakistan
- Operators: Pakistan Navy
- Preceded by: Type 12 Leander
- Succeeded by: Zulfiquar class
- Cost: $120 million USD (2002)
- Built: 1969–1975
- In service: 1993–2023
- In commission: 1993–2021
- Completed: 6
- Retired: 6

General characteristics
- Type: frigate/guided-missile destroyer
- Displacement: As built in the United Kingdom: 3,250 long tons (3,302 t) full load; As modernized in Pakistan: 3,700 long tons (3,759 t) full load
- Length: 384 ft (117 m) o/a
- Beam: 41 ft 7 in (12.67 m)
- Draft: 19 ft 6 in (5.94 m)
- Propulsion: COGOG; 2 × Rolls-Royce TM3B gas turbines, 50,000 hp (37 MW) (sustained); 2 × Rolls-Royce RM1C gas turbines (cruising), 9,900 hp (7.4 MW) (sustained)
- Speed: 32 knots (59 km/h; 37 mph)
- Range: 4,000 nmi (7,400 km) at 17 kn (31 km/h); 1,200 nmi (2,200 km) at 30 kn (56 km/h)
- Complement: 15 Officers, 200 Enlisted
- Sensors & processing systems: Air-to-surface search radar: 1 × Marconi Type 992R; 1 × Thales Signaal D08; Surface search radar: 1 × Kelvin Hughes Type 1006
- Electronic warfare & decoys: TKWA/MASS (Multi Ammunition Softkill System)
- Armament: 1 × Vickers 4.5 in (114 mm)/55 Mk.8 AS/AA gun; 1 × Phalanx CIWS; 2 × triple STWS-1 torpedo launchers (for Mark 46 torpedoes) [Badr and Shahjahan only]; 2 × 4-cell Mk 141 launchers (for Harpoon SSMs) [Badr, Babur and Shahjahan]; or; 1 × 6-cell LY-60N SAM launcher [Tariq, Khaibar and Tippu Sultan]
- Aircraft carried: 1 × Westland Lynx HAS.3 helicopter; 1 × Aerospatiale Alouette III helicopter; 1 × Camcopter S-100 UAV
- Aviation facilities: Flight deck and hangar

The Tariq-class destroyers were a class of guided missile destroyers of the Pakistan Navy. They were acquired from the British Royal Navy in 1993–94. The Tariqs were formerly commissioned in the Royal Navy's Surface Fleet as Type 21 (Amazon-class) frigates, a general purpose frigate in the Royal Navy.

The British frigates were immediately acquired when the United States refused to renew the lease of the four Garcia and four Brooke-class frigates, due to the enforcement of the Pressler Amendment. requiring Pakistan to return the vessels to the United States at the end of their five-year lease.

Upon acquisition, all six frigates were reconfigured to enhance their engineering design and construction and military software updates that feature Swedish technology, giving them missile launching capability. Following these upgrades, the ships were reclassified as destroyers.

In 2008, the Pakistan Navy had carried out a successful test of the Camcopter S-100, an unmanned aerial vehicle, from the flight deck of a Tariq-class destroyer. By 2020–23, the Tariq-class destroyers slowly phased out from their services, and are now all decommissioned from its military service.

== Negotiation and procurement ==
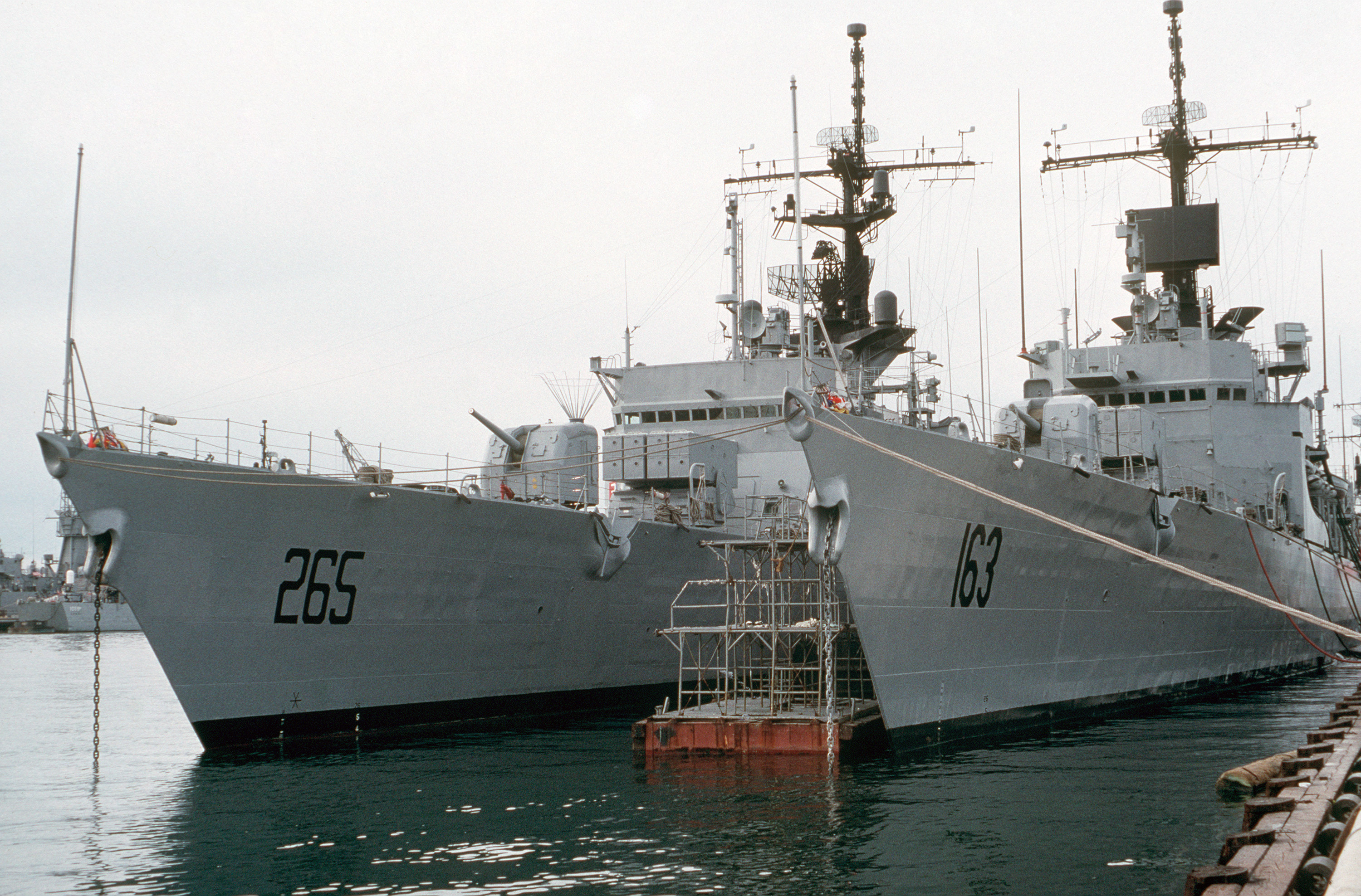
The Brooke and Garcia-class guided missile destroyers being commissioned into Pakistan Navy in 1986. All were returned to United States in 1993–95.

Procurement of Type 21 frigates dates back to 1966 when the UK first made an offer to Pakistan to jointly build three Type 21 frigates. The Ayub administration rejected the proposal as they wanted to allocate the funds to acquire Daphné-class submarines from France. Since 1966, the Pakistan Navy had wanted to acquire Type 21 frigates from the UK, submitting several proposals to the Government of Pakistan for acquiring the Type 21 frigates in 1970s.

In 1987–88, Admiral Tariq Kamal Khan entered into negotiations with the Royal Navy and began lobbying the Zia administration for releasing the funds to acquire the Type 21 frigates in 1988.

Despite the initial efforts with the Royal Navy, the Pakistan Navy leased four Garcia-class frigate and four Brooke-class frigate from the United States Navy in 1988; the selection was based on technological evaluation and Pakistani military specifications. The lease was set for five years with an option of renewing or purchasing the lease afterwards based on the mutual understanding between two nations.

After the enforcement of the military embargo by the United States Congress in 1994, the lease was not renewed, therefore, the eight warships had to be returned to the United States Navy in Singapore, resulting Pakistan's sea borders vulnerable to foreign activities.

During this time, Admiral Saeed Mohammad Khan used his personal relations with the British Admiral of the Fleet Sir Julian Oswald, who helped him negotiate with the British government to immediately procure and acquire the six remaining Type 21 frigates (Note: Two Type 21s had been lost in the 1982 Falklands War) from the British in 1993–94.

The Pakistan Ministry of Defence authorized the purchase of the Type 21 frigates from the United Kingdom for US$60 million, and reportedly spent nearly the same amount on converting and modernizing the warships from general purpose frigates to destroyer standards.

On 1 November 1993, the lead ship, Tariq (formerly HMS Ambuscade), reported to the naval base in Karachi and the transfer of all warships was completed on 1 January 1995. The induction of the Tariq-class destroyers marked the replacement of the Garcia and Brooke-class frigates in the Pakistan Navy's surface command.

== Modernization ==
In 2002, it was reported that Pakistan had spent additional US$60 million to modernize the Tariq-class fleet according their Navy's specification from the general purpose frigates to the combat variant destroyer standards. In the service of the Royal Navy, the Seacat, Exocet, torpedo tubes, and Lynx helicopters were distinct features in the Amazon/Type 21 frigates. With the Pakistan Navy's service, Exocet and the Seacat missiles were removed as well as torpedo tubes which were subsequently removed in all warships with the exception made in Badr and Shah Jahan.

The weapon systems and computers fitted in the Tariqs features Swedish technology. The flight deck and the Lynx helicopters remained with the Tariqs and arrived in Karachi with their respective warships.

The Royal Navy did not transfer the Exocet and Seacat missiles that were replaced with the Chinese-made LY-60 SAM system. Instead, the more capable U.S.-built Harpoon missiles were installed to replace the British weapon systems. Extensive installation of computer software and missile deployments allowed the classification of Tariq from the DDE (destroyer escort) to the DDG (guided missile), with lead ship featuring the installation of LY-60 guided missiles.

In 2008, it was reported by the Inter-Services Public Relations (ISPR) that the Pakistan Navy have successfully tested a flight takeoff and landing of the Camcopter S-100 UAV from a Tariq-class flight deck.

== Ships ==
Image	Name	Former name	Commissioned with RN	Fate
	Babur	Amazon	Commissioned in the Royal Navy in 1974	Transferred in 1993 to Pakistan Navy. Decommissioned in December 2014. Scrapped for metal acquisition by National Shipping Corporation.
	Tariq	Ambuscade	Commissioned into Royal Navy in 1975.	Transferred to Pakistan Navy in 1993, served as the lead ship of her class until 2023. Converted into museum ship in Scotland.
	Tippu Sultan	Avenger	Commissioned into Royal Navy in 1975	Transferred to Pakistan Navy in 1994. Decommissioned in 2020. Sunk as Target in 2020.
	Khaibar	Arrow	Commissioned into Royal Navy in 1976	Transferred to Pakistan Navy in 1994. Decommissioned and sunk as target ship during Exercise Sea Spark in 2022.
	Badr	Alacrity	Commissioned into Royal Navy in 1977	Transferred to Pakistan Navy in 1994. Decommissioned in 2014. Scrap for metal acquisition by National Shipping Corporation
	Shah Jahan	Active	Commissioned into Royal Navy in 1977	Transferred to Pakistan Navy in 1994. Decommissioned in January 2021. Sunk as Target in 2021
