= 2008 in Pakistan =

- Decades: 1980s; 1990s; 2000s; 2010s; 2020s
- See also: History of Pakistan; List of years in Pakistan; Timeline of Pakistani history

Events from the year 2008 in Pakistan.

== Incumbents ==
=== Federal government ===
- President:
  - until 18 August: Pervez Musharraf
  - 18 August-9 September: Muhammad Mian Soomro
  - starting 9 September: Asif Ali Zardari
- Prime Minister: Muhammad Mian Soomro (acting) (starting 16 November)
- Chief Justice: Abdul Hameed Dogar (acting)

=== Governors ===
- Governor of Balochistan – Owais Ahmed Ghani (until 5 January); Nawab Zulfikar Ali Magsi (starting 5 January)
- Governor of Khyber Pakhtunkhwa – Ali Jan Aurakzai (until 7 January); Owais Ahmed Ghani (starting 7 January)
- Governor of Punjab – Khalid Maqbool (until 16 May); Salmaan Taseer (starting 16 May)
- Governor of Sindh – Ishrat-ul-Ibad Khan

== Events ==
=== January ===
- 2 January – Pakistan announces that elections originally scheduled for 8 January will be postponed until the 18 February, following the assassination of Benazir Bhutto.
- 3 January – Benazir Bhutto assassination: President of Pakistan Pervez Musharraf denies any role in Benazir Bhutto's death. (CNN)
- 11 January – Beginning of Islamic Hijri year 1429 First of Muharram on Friday 11 January 2008.
- 19 January - Saturday 9th of Muharram, Official holiday in Pakistan in memory of the martyrdom of Imam Hussain
- 20 January – Sunday 10th of Muharram, Ashura, an official holiday in Pakistan-In memory of the martyrdom of Imam Hussain
- 31 January – The United States announces that Abu Laith al-Libi, a senior commander of Al-Qaeda who recruited and trained operatives, was killed in a missile strike in northwest Pakistan

=== February ===
- 9 February – 15 People are killed in an election rally in Charsada.
- 11 February – Pakistan's ambassador to Afghanistan is believed to have been kidnapped by suspected pro-Taliban militants.
- 12 February – The Government of Pakistan steps up security for "fair, transparent and peaceful" elections scheduled for 18 February.
- 13 February – Pakistan test fires a nuclear capable short range ballistic missile.
- Two suspects confessed to a judge that they helped to arm the suicide bomber who killed Bhutto.
- 14 February – Three soldiers are killed by a bomb explosion near Khair, Surabaja.
- 15 February – Pakistan announces the arrest of a fifth man in connection with the assassination of Benazir Bhutto.
- Pakistan and India agree to double the number of flights between the two nations.
- 16 February – 37 people are killed in a bombing in the town of Parachinar at an election rally.
- 18 February – Elections take place in Pakistan.
- 19 February – Election results show that President Musharraf's party Pakistan Muslim League (Q) have received a heavy defeat.
- 21 February – Pakistan's two main opposition parties agree to form a coalition following the elections.
- 29 February – At least 45 people died and 82 were wounded in a suicide attack on the funeral February 29, 2008 of a district superintendent of police – killed earlier in the day in a separate attack – in Swat province.

=== March ===
- 22 March – The PPP nominate Yousaf Raza Gillani to become the Prime Minister of Pakistan.
- 25 March – Yousaf Raza Gillani is sworn in as Prime Minister of Pakistan.
- 24 March – Prime minister Gillani vows to free judges who were detained during emergency rule.
- 29 March – PM Gillani announces to the National Assembly that the fight against terrorism will be the top priority of the new government.

=== April ===
- 1 April – The new government of Pakistan announces that it will rethink the policy on militants.
- 15 April – President Musharraf announces he is lobbying the Chinese government to build gas and oil pipelines.
- 16 April – The Olympic torch arrives in Pakistan.
- 19 April – Taliban rebels release a video of Pakistan's ambassador to Afghanistan who they are holding as a hostage.

=== May ===
- 12 May – PML (N) quits the cabinet, following the failure to restore judges.
- 16 May – Pakistan's Ambassador to Afghanistan, Tariq Azizuddin was set free by kidnappers.
- 17 May – Lawyers announced their plan for Long March to be held on 10 June, for the Restoration of Judges.

=== June ===
- 1 June – Sheikh Rasheed Ahmed left Pakistan Muslim League (Q) and formed his new Party, Awami Muslim League.
- 2 June – Car bomb attack near Denmark Embassy kills 8 people.

=== July ===
- 6 July – A suicide bomber attacked a police station in Islamabad killing 12 policemen and seven civilians in a rally marking the first anniversary of Lal Masjid siege.

=== August ===
- 12 August – First National Youth Awards conferred.
- 18 August – President Pervez Musharraf, faced with the prospect of being impeached, resigns from the office of president.
- 19 August – 32 people were killed while 55 injured in an attack in Dera Ismail Khan carried by Tehreek-i-Taliban Pakistan.
- 23 August – At least 15 people were killed in a suicide attack at a police check post in Char Bagh area of Swat. Also, three persons including two kids were killed in a bomb blast in Abuha.

=== September ===
- 9 September – Asif Ali Zardari became 11th President of Pakistan
- 20 September – The Islamabad Marriott Hotel bombing executed by unidentified terrorists kills 54 people and injures 266.

== See also ==
- 2008 in Pakistani television
- List of Pakistani films of 2008
