= PNS Tariq (D-181) =

Decommissioned Tariq-class destroyer of the Pakistan Navy

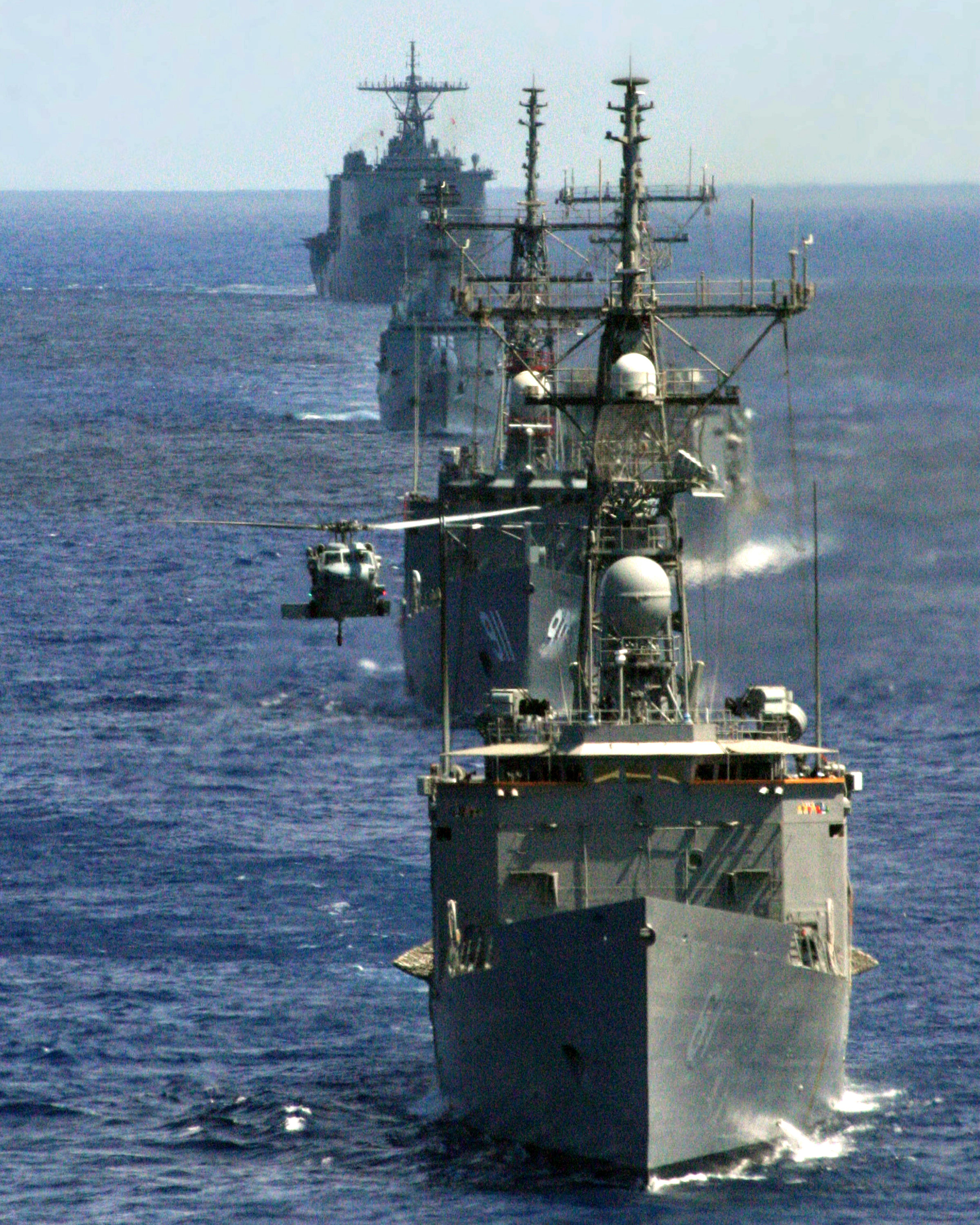
- Tariq (DDG 181) (front of USS Pearl Harbor, the last ship in the background) on the fourth row of the formation led by USS Ingraham, participating in the naval drill in the Mediterranean Sea in 2005.

History

Pakistan
- Name: PNS Tariq
- Namesake: Tariq ibn Ziyad
- Builder: Yarrow Shipbuilders in Scotland
- Yard number: 1008
- Laid down: 1 September 1971
- Sponsored by: Benazir Bhutto
- Acquired: 28 July 1993
- Recommissioned: 1 January 1993
- Decommissioned: 5 August 2023
- In service: 1993–2023
- Refit: 1993
- Home port: Naval Base Karachi
- Identification: Pennant number: D-181
- Fate: Retired
- Status: Decommissioning; currently undergoing renovation works for display as a museum ship
- Badge

General characteristics
- Class & type: Tariq-class frigate
- Displacement: 3,700 long tons (3,759 t) full load
- Length: 384 ft (117 m)
- Beam: 41 ft 9 in (12.73 m)
- Draught: 19 ft 6 in (5.94 m)
- Propulsion: COGOG: 2 × Rolls-Royce Olympus gas turbines; 2 × Rolls-Royce Tyne RM1A gas turbines for cruising
- Speed: 32 knots (59 km/h; 37 mph)
- Range: 4,000 nmi (7,400 km; 4,600 mi) at 17 knots (31 km/h; 20 mph)
- Complement: 192, 14 officers, 178 enlisted
- Armament: 1 × Vickers 4.5 in (114 mm)/55 Mk.8 AS/AA gun (25rds/min to 22 km/11.9nmi); 1 × Phalanx CIWS; 1 × 6-cell LY-60N SAM launcher; 2 × 20 mm Oerlikon cannon
- Aircraft carried: 1 × Lynx HAS.3 helicopter
- Aviation facilities: Flight deck and hangar

PNS Tariq (DDG-181) was the lead ship of the Tariq-class destroyers in the Surface Command of the Pakistan Navy that served in the military service from 1993 until 2023. Prior to being commissioned in the Pakistan Navy, she served in the Royal Navy, as general purpose frigate HMS Ambuscade.

Designed and constructed by Yarrow Shipbuilders, Ltd. at Glasgow, Scotland, in 1975, she underwent an extensive modernization and mid-life upgrade program by the KSEW Ltd. at the Naval Base Karachi in 1998–2002.

Tariq was decommissioned on 6 August 2023, alongside plans to return her to the United Kingdom for conversion to a museum ship.

== Service history ==
=== Acquisition, construction, and modernization ===
Before commissioning in the Pakistan Navy, she served in the Royal Navy as HMS Ambuscade, saw active military operations during the United Kingdom's Falklands War with Argentina in 1980s. She was lead ship based on the Type 21/Amazon design and was constructed by the Yarrow Shipbuilders, Ltd. in Glasgow in Scotland in 1973–75.

After the successful negotiations took place between Pakistan and the United Kingdom to procure the entire fleet of Type 21/Amazon frigates, she was decommissioned by the Royal Navy and a contingent of Pakistan Navy's personnel under Commander Muhammad Anwar arrived to receive training of her operations. She was commissioned in the services of Pakistan Navy on 28 July 1993 at the Port of Plymouth in England, reporting to its Naval Base Karachi on 18 November 1993.

She was named after Tariq ibn Ziyad, the commander who led the Umayyad conquest of Visigothic Hispania in 711–718 A.D. She was sponsored by the Benazir Bhutto, who as a chief guest and then-Prime Minister serving at that time.

The Royal Navy did not transfer either the Exocet and Seacat missiles, which were removed prior to arriving at Karachi but the Westland Lynx helicopters remained with the ship. The modernization of the ship was performed by KSEW Ltd which later installed the Phalanx system in place of the Seacat missiles as well as the Mk. 36 SRBOC launchers and 20 mm and 30 mm guns were fitted.

=== Deployment ===
Her wartime performance included in deployments in patrolling off the Gulf of Aden, Gulf of Oman, Persian Gulf, Arabian Sea as well as deploying in the Mediterranean Sea when she was part of the multinational military exercise with the U.S. Navy in 2005.

After the Indian Ocean tsunami in 2004, Tariq was deployed on a search-and-rescue mission to the Maldives, where she rescued 377 tourists.

== Decommissioning and disposal ==
On 6 August 2023, after 30 years service, Tariq was decommissioned in the presence of the Minister of Foreign Affairs, Bilawal Bhutto Zardari, son of the ship's original sponsor, Benazir Bhutto.

The Pakistan Navy has responded positively to proposals to return the Falklands veteran to the UK to become a museum ship near her birthplace on the River Clyde, at Glasgow or Greenock.

In October 2026 Navy Lookout published an article that assessed that the return of Ambuscade to the UK seemed unlikely.

== Gallery ==
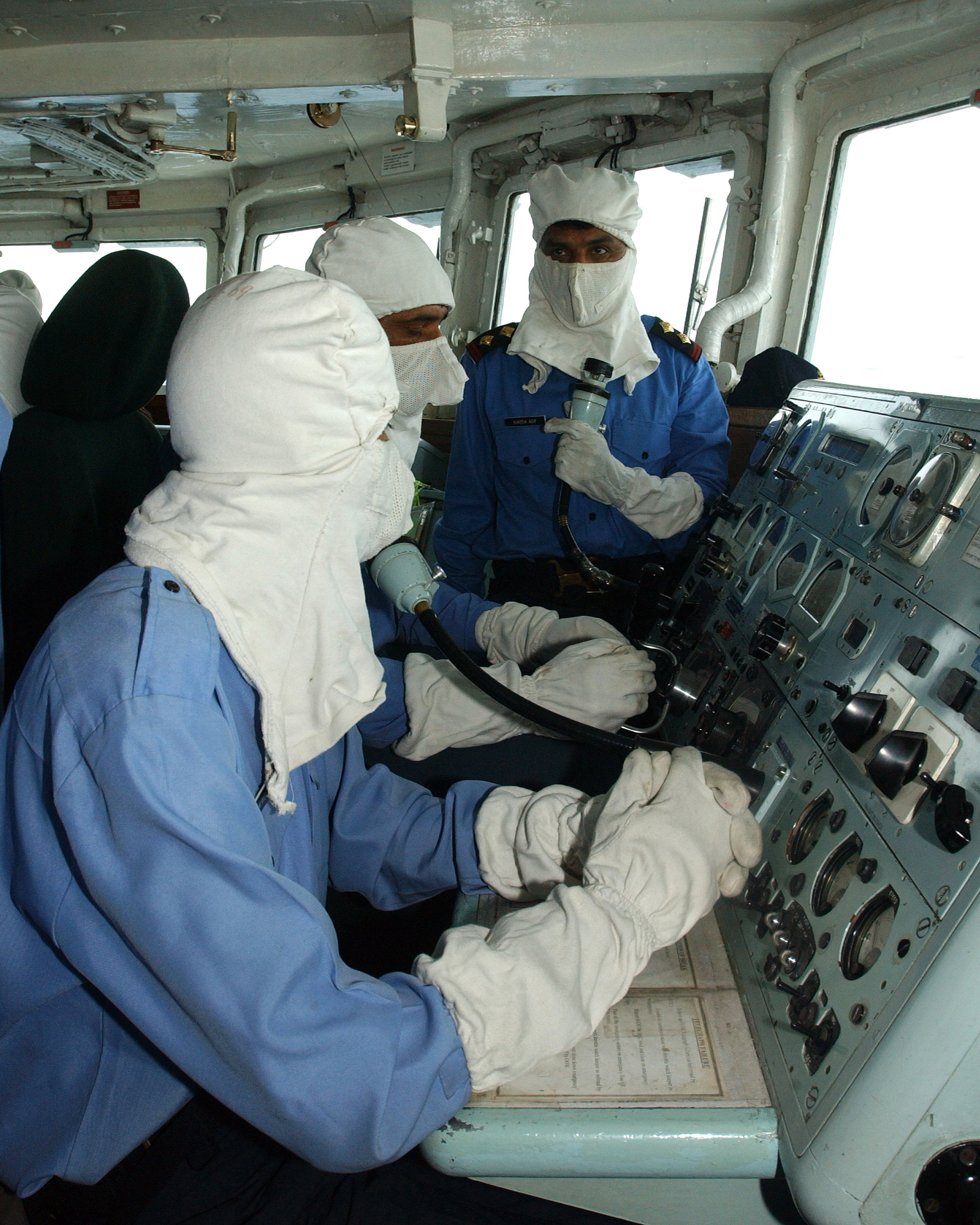
The Pakistan Navy's enlists wearing the anti-flash gear observing the VBSS drill under the Pakistan Navy SSGN and the U.S. Navy SEALs during CTF-150 operations in the Gulf of Oman in 2005.

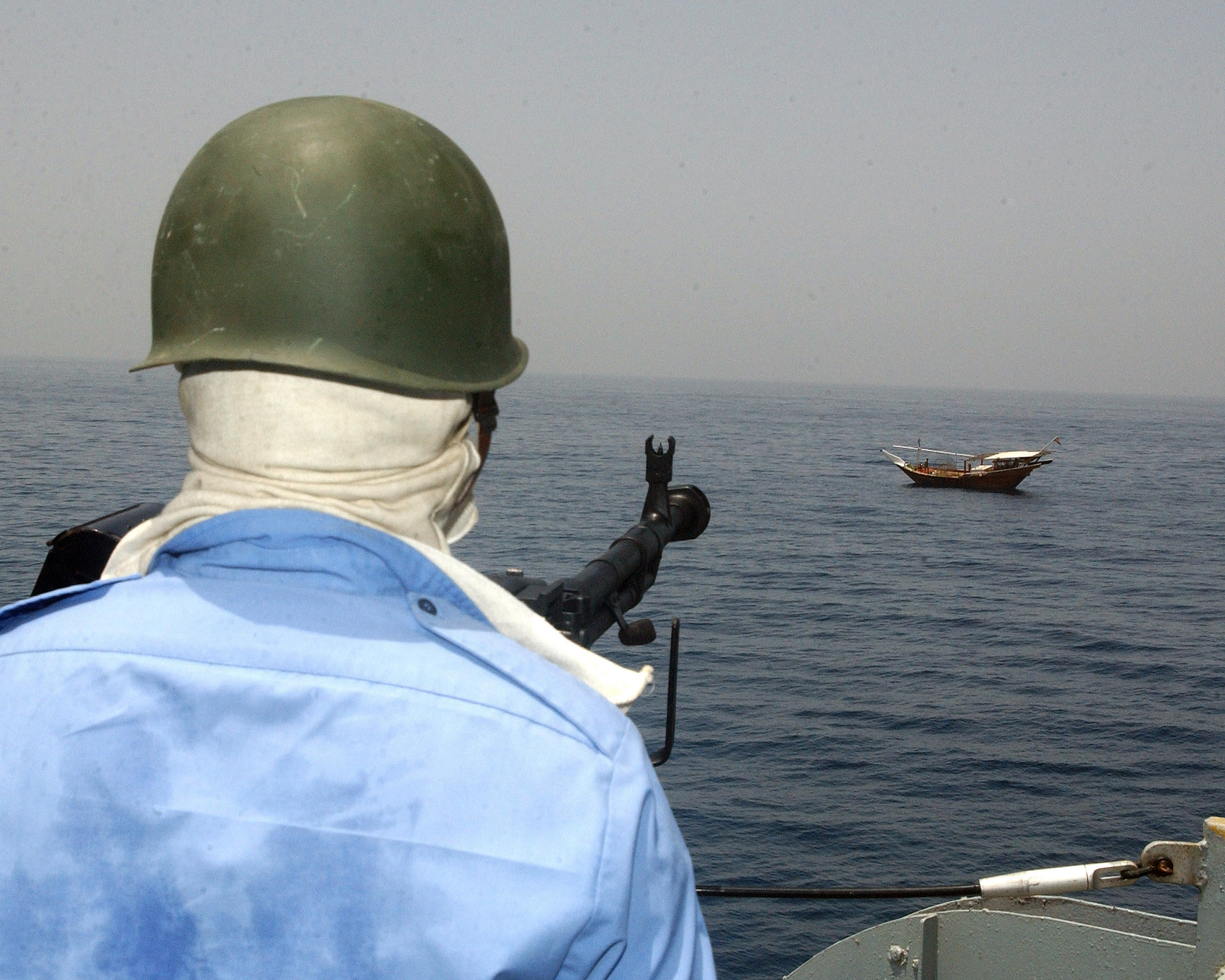
The Pakistan Navy's Master-at-Arms observes the VBBS drill holding on the naval gun in Gulf of Oman in 2005.

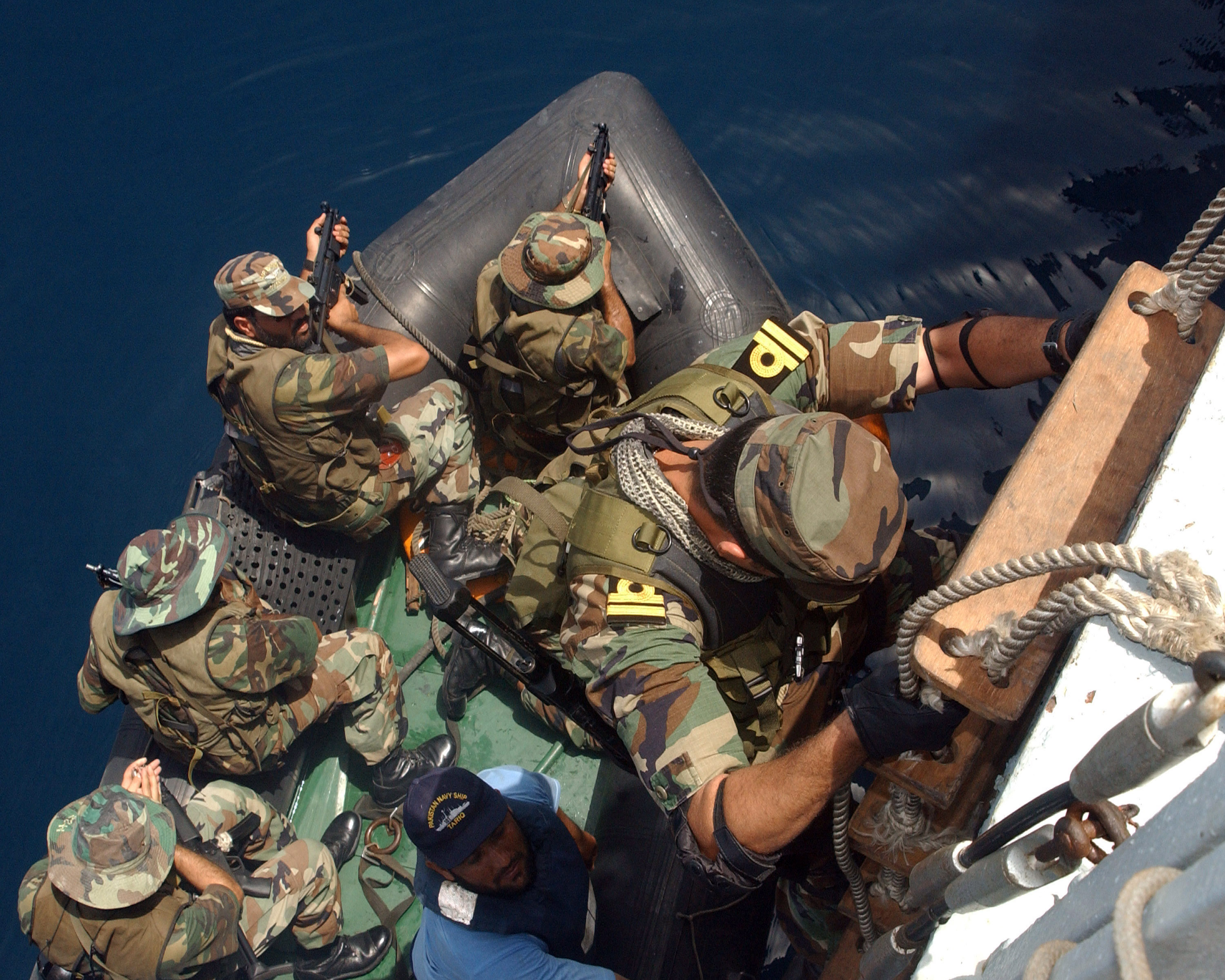
The Pakistan Navy SSGN performing the VBSS drill aboard PNS Tariq in 2005.

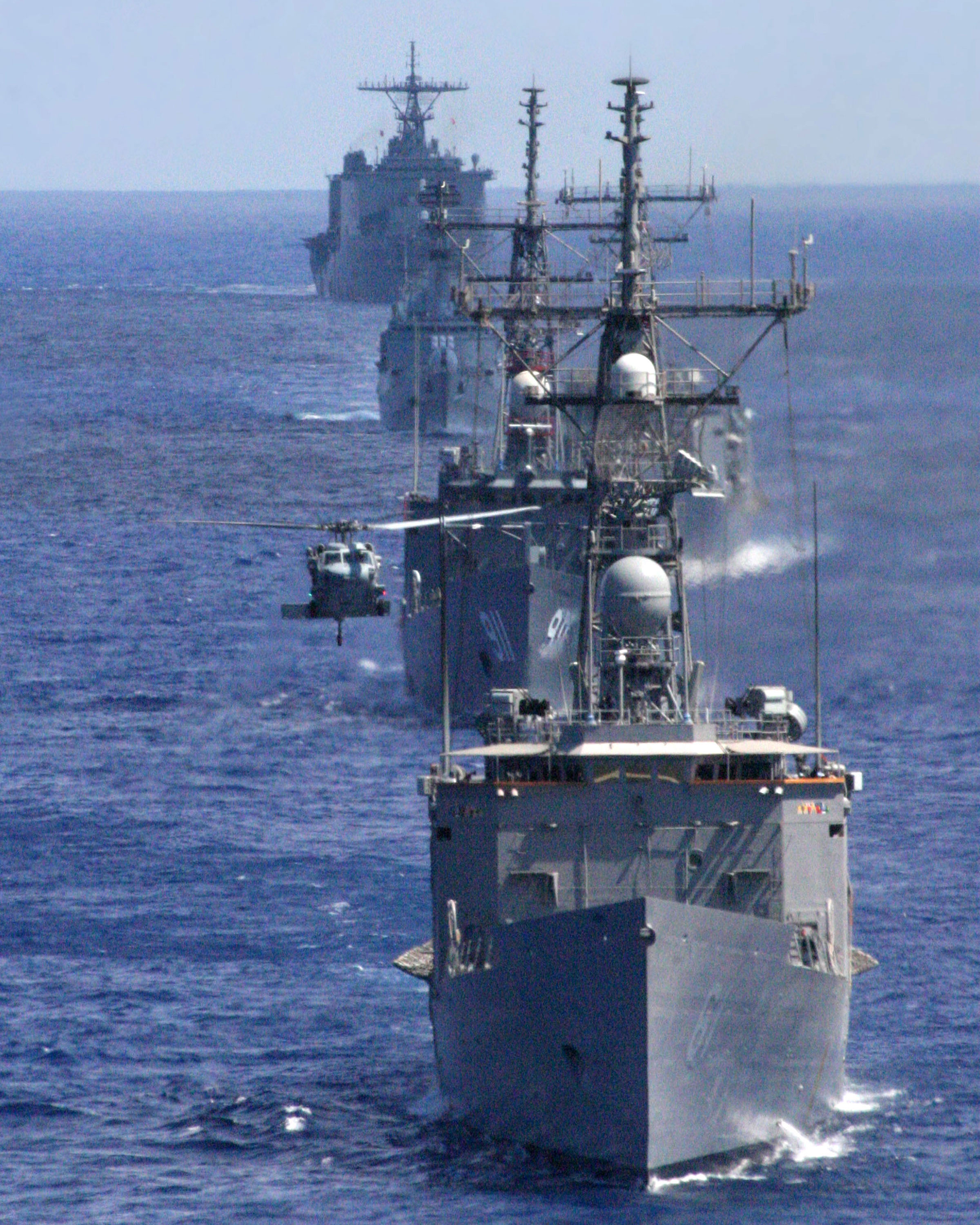
A SH-60 Seahawk helicopter preparing to land on the flight deck of USS Ingraham, leading the task force of Egyptian and Pakistan Navy during the Operation Bright Star in the Mediterranean Sea in 2005. Tariq is in the fourth row in front of USS Pearl Harbor, the last ship of this column.
