= 2003 in Pakistan =

- Decades: 1980s; 1990s; 2000s; 2010s; 2020s
- See also: History of Pakistan; List of years in Pakistan; Timeline of Pakistani history

Events from the year 2003 in Pakistan.

== Incumbents ==
=== Federal government ===
- President: Pervez Musharraf
- Prime Minister: Zafarullah Khan Jamali
- Chief Justice: Sheikh Riaz Ahmad (until 31 December)

=== Governors ===
- Governor of Balochistan –
  - until 29 January: Amir-ul-Mulk Mengal
  - 29 January-11 August: Abdul Qadir Baloch
  - starting 11 August: Owais Ahmed Ghani
- Governor of Khyber Pakhtunkhwa – Iftikhar Hussain Shah
- Governor of Punjab – Khalid Maqbool
- Governor of Sindh – Ishrat-ul-Ibad Khan

== Events ==
=== January ===
- An NGO launches a pilot mine clearance project in the Bajaur Agency.

=== March ===
- The Pakistan cricket team are not happy following their poor performance at the world cup, which led to them being knocked out in the first round. They were fined for their poor performance.

=== August ===
- Floods in Sindh province result in tens of thousands of people fleeing to relief camps and a food crisis. Badin District is the worst affected area.

=== September ===
- President Pervez Musharraf at the UN General Assembly in New York says that Pakistan would be willing to send troops to Iraq.

=== November ===
- The National Assembly of Pakistan meets for the first time since the 1999 coup.

== Births ==
- 15 February – Naseem Shah, cricketer
- 11 October – Arisha Razi, actress
