= 2001 in Pakistan =

- Decades: 1980s; 1990s; 2000s; 2010s; 2020s
- See also: History of Pakistan; List of years in Pakistan; Timeline of Pakistani history

Events from the year 2001 in Pakistan.

== Incumbents ==
=== Federal government ===
- President: Muhammad Rafiq Tarar (until 20 June), Pervez Musharraf (starting 20 June)
- Chief Justice: Irshad Hasan Khan

=== Governors ===
- Governor of Balochistan – Amir-ul-Mulk Mengal
- Governor of Khyber Pakhtunkhwa – Iftikhar Hussain Shah
- Governor of Punjab – Muhammad Safdar (until 29 October); Khalid Maqbool (starting 29 October)
- Governor of Sindh – Muhammad Mian Soomro

== Events ==
=== May ===
- 23 May – India invites future president Pervez Musharraf to peace talks.
- 28 May – Musharraf formally accepts the invitation.

=== July ===
President Musharraf meets Indian PM Vajpayee in Agra for a three-day summit; the talks fail.

=== September ===
- The September 11 attacks in America result in Pakistan agreeing to cooperate with the campaign against Al Qaeda.

=== August ===
- The Pakistan cricket team beats Bangladesh at Multan.

=== November ===
- Anthrax-infected letters, the first in Asia, are sent to the Karachi office of the Jang newspaper; there are no casualties.

=== December ===
- India blames an attack on its parliament on Pakistan, leading to a massive build-up of troops on both sides of the border and rising tension between the two nations.

== Births ==
- 5 January – Javeria Abbasi, television actress and former female model
- 12 January – Sara Kashif, actress
- 22 February – Zuhab Khan, actor
