= 2006 in Pakistan =

- Decades: 1980s; 1990s; 2000s; 2010s; 2020s
- See also: History of Pakistan; List of years in Pakistan; Timeline of Pakistani history

Events from the year 2006 in Pakistan.

== Incumbents ==
=== Federal government ===
- President: Pervez Musharraf
- Prime Minister: Shaukat Aziz
- Chief Justice: Iftikhar Muhammad Chaudhry

=== Governors ===
- Governor of Balochistan – Owais Ahmed Ghani
- Governor of Khyber Pakhtunkhwa – Khalilur Rehman (until 23 May); Ali Jan Aurakzai (starting 23 May)
- Governor of Punjab – Khalid Maqbool (until 16 May); Salmaan Taseer (starting 16 May)
- Governor of Sindh – Ishrat-ul-Ibad Khan

== Events ==
=== January ===
The Indian cricket team began its tour of Pakistan.

=== March ===
March 1, 2006
Nationwide poultry tests planned: The federal health minister said here on Tuesday that health and agriculture ministries had formed special teams to check poultry stock throughout the country to counter potential bird flu threat.

March 2, 2006
Bush to help resolve Kashmir dispute, hopes Musharraf: President General Pervez Musharraf said on Wednesday he expected US President George W. Bush to use his influence to help settle the Kashmir dispute.

March 3, 2006
India, Pakistan got nukes legitimately: The US Ambassador to the United Nations, John Bolton, said on Wednesday the way India and Pakistan had obtained nuclear arms was legitimate, in contrast to Iran.

March 4, 2006
Govt urged to promote sheep farming: The Union of Small and Medium Enterprises (UNISAME) has reiterated its call for setting up sheep breeding farms all over the country to meet protein requirements of the country.
President Bush and President Musharraf of Pakistan Discuss Strengthened Relationship: US President George W. Bush arrived in Islamabad on Friday night for his first visit to Pakistan.

March 5, 2006
Agreement on trade security signed: Pakistan has become the first country to receive American equipment for trans-ocean clearance of goods for blocking terror-related shipments from Pakistani export outlets to the United States.

March 6, 2006
PM Shaukat Aziz arrives in the UK: Prime Minister Shaukat Aziz said on Sunday his three-day official visit to Britain was aimed at promoting economic, political and defence relations between the two countries.

March 7, 2006
Focus on reducing poverty, creating jobs: Musharraf: ‘Pakistan not in arms race’: President Gen Pervez Musharraf has said Pakistan is focused on improving its economy and alleviating poverty and eradicating terrorism from its soil and is not interested in joining a "numerical arms race" with India.

March 8, 2006
Kabul told to bolster border control: President Gen Pervez Musharraf held talks on Wednesday with a senior US military general on escalating tension with neighbouring Afghanistan and demanded intelligence sharing by Kabul on militants in ‘real time’’ to help improve security along their border, officials said.

March 9, 2006
Pakistan, India to discuss expansion of civil aviation links: India and Pakistan on Tuesday agreed to continue discussions for the enhancement of capacities, frequencies and gateways for the benefit of the peoples of the two countries.

March 10, 2006
2006 Pakistan landmine blast

March 11, 2006
Leaders want to forget past, think of future: A dinner hosted by Foreign Minister Khurshid Kasuri for participants of the Pugwash-sponsored International Conference on Kashmir here on Friday ended on a frenzied note.

March 12, 2006
Senators elect chairman, deputy today: Fifty newly elected senators will take oath today (Sunday) following which the House will elect a new chairman and his deputy. With their oath, the newly elected senators will replace half of the senators who got retired on Saturday after completing three-year term in the Upper House of parliament.

March 16, 2006
First bus from Jalalabad arrives in Peshawar: The first bus with about 25 passengers aboard arrived here on Wednesday from the Afghan city of Jalalabad after a gap of 27 years.

March 21, 2006
Blasphemous Pakistani internet sites blocked: The Supreme Court was told on Monday that all 12 websites displaying sacrilegious cartoons of Muhammad on the internet had been blocked.

S.H. Hashmi passes away: S. H. Hashmi, one of the pioneers of the advertising industry in Pakistan and managing director of Orient McCan Ericson, died after suffering from chronic respiratory disorder. He was 71.

- March 23 – Pakistan Day being observed today: Pakistan Day is being observed today (Thursday) with determination to strive harder for the country's prosperity, stability and security. The day will dawn with 21-gun salute in the federal capital and 19- gun salute in provincial capitals. Prayers will be offered for the country's progress and stability. It is a public holiday today. National flag will be hoisted on major government buildings. According to a decision taken after last year's earthquake, the day will be observed with simplicity and the usual armed forces’ parade will not be held. The major ceremony of the day will be held in President House where President Pervez Musharraf will confer awards upon top-ranking army and civil officials. Wreaths will be laid on the graves of Quaid-i-Azam Mohammad Ali Jinnah and Allama Iqbal.
- March 23 – The United States and the United Kingdom are identified as the top portfolio investors in Pakistan sparking fears and concern that any disturbance in political relations with the two could cause instability in Pakistan.

=== April ===
April 11, 2006
The 2011 Cricket World Cup will be the tenth time this tournament has been held, and will be held in the four Asian Test cricket playing countries India, Pakistan, Sri Lanka and Bangladesh.

=== June ===
June 26, 2006
Suicide car bomber kills nine Pakistani soldiers. Officials say that the explosives-laden vehicle detonated about six kilometres (four miles) east of Miranshah, the main town in the North Waziristan region.

=== August ===
August 26, 2006
Baloch rebel chief Akbar Bugti killed. The Pakistan Air Force bombed his mountain hideout.

=== September ===
September 24, 2006
National Blackout: A technical fault in Water and Power Development Authority (WAPDA) triggered a nationwide blackout in Pakistan on Sunday. It was not sabotage.

Bird Show organized by Budgerigar Society of Pakistan (BSP) in Lahore: BSP changed bird fancying in Pakistan after organizing the first ever Bird Show in Pakistan where they invited an international judge for a Budgerigar Competition in Pakistan. The judge was invited from London. It was the first ever bird show which was organized under WBO standards. Spokesman Naveed Ijaz confirmed that BSP will continue organizing such events, he also shared that the next event of this level by BSP will be organized on October 21, 2007 at Avari Hotel Lahore.

=== October ===
October 16, 2006
Asif and Shoaib fail doping test: Pakistan have withdrawn fast bowlers Shoaib Akhtar and Mohammad Asif from the Champions Trophy in India after testing positive for nandrolone. The tests were carried out by the Pakistan Cricket Board three weeks ago and showed positive results for the performance-enhancing steroid. They are Pakistan's best new-ball bowlers but face bans of up to two years if the second test is confirmed.

== Deaths ==
- Akbar Bugti, Tumandar of the Bugti tribe of Baloch people who served as the Minister of State for Interior and Governor of Balochistan Province, on 26 August

== See also ==
- 2006 in Pakistani television
- List of Pakistani films of 2006
