= 2004 in Pakistan =

- Decades: 1980s; 1990s; 2000s; 2010s; 2020s
- See also: History of Pakistan; List of years in Pakistan; Timeline of Pakistani history

Pakistan experienced unprecedented economic growth during FY 2004. Its large-scale manufacturing sector grew at a rate of over 18%. Hard-currency reserves, having grown phenomenally in recent years, reached record levels. GDP growth reached 8.4% in the twelve months ending June 30, 2004. Pakistan's stock market has been one of the best-performing stock markets this century, as of 2005. The government's credit rating was upgraded by Moody's and Standard & Poor's. Pakistan announced that it no longer needed International Monetary Fund (IMF) assistance. The government's economic reforms were praised highly by supranational institutions such as the World Bank, IMF and the Asian Development Bank.

== Incumbents ==
=== Federal government ===
- President: Pervez Musharraf
- Prime Minister:
  - until 26 July: Zafarullah Khan Jamali
  - 26 July-30 July: vacant
  - 30 July-20 August: Chaudhry Shujaat Hussain
  - starting 20 August: Shaukat Aziz
- Chief Justice: Nazim Hussain Siddiqui

=== Governors ===
- Governor of Balochistan – Owais Ahmed Ghani
- Governor of Khyber Pakhtunkhwa – Iftikhar Hussain Shah
- Governor of Punjab – Khalid Maqbool
- Governor of Sindh – Ishrat-ul-Ibad Khan

== Events ==
=== Politics ===
- January 1 – Musharraf wins a vote of confidence from the electoral college, obtaining 658 votes out of 1170, and is deemed to be elected to the office of President.
- March 27 – Pakistan Army troops that battled foreign militants and their local supporters in South Waziristan are winding up their operation.
- April 7 – The National Assembly passed the National Security Council (NSC) bill.
- April 14 – The Senate of Pakistan passed the National Security Council (NSC) bill.
- April 19 – President Pervez Musharraf signs the recently passed National Security Council (NSC) Bill, bringing into being the 13-seat NSC.
- April 20 – The National Alliance announced the merger of the alliance with the unified Pakistan Muslim League.
- April 22 – The European Parliament voted in favour of a new trade and cooperation agreement with Pakistan, giving a vital boost to Islamabad's relations with the European Union.
- April 27 – The Pakistan Army is reducing its numerical strength by about 50,000 men.
- May 22 – The Commonwealth Ministerial Action Group welcomed Pakistan back into the Commonwealth, noting the restoration of the Constitution and progress made in rebuilding democratic institutions and restoring democracy.

=== Economy ===
- April 15 – Representatives of the provinces agreed to share resources on a multi-factor formula, provided the federal government enhanced their share.
- April 21 – The World Bank expects that poverty will start reducing soon in Pakistan, as the country has surpassed most of the targets set by the bank under its country assistance strategy (CAS).
- April 29 – Pakistan Telecommunication Company Limited (PTCL) earns a net profit of Rs 19.53 bn in the first three quarters of the financial year.

=== Sports ===
- March 28 – The ninth SAF Games are launched in an Olympics-style opening ceremony.

=== Miscellaneous ===
- January 18 – Pakistani agents arrest seven Al-Qaida suspects and confiscate weapons during a raid in the southern city of Karachi.
- March 29 – Indus River System (Irsa) is expected to distribute water among provinces on the basis of historical use.
- April 29 – Major power breakdown all over northern and central Punjab.
- September 9 – About 70 people, believed to be Taliban or Al Qaida militants, are killed when Pakistan's air force jets raid a terrorist training camp in a tribal region bordering Afghanistan.

== Deaths ==
- 24 June – Pir Syed Muhammad Binyamin Rizvi, Member of the Provincial Assembly of Punjab.
