= 2007 in Pakistan =

- Decades: 1980s; 1990s; 2000s; 2010s; 2020s
- See also: History of Pakistan; List of years in Pakistan; Timeline of Pakistani history

Events from the year 2007 in Pakistan.

== Incumbents ==
=== Federal government ===
- President: Pervez Musharraf
- Prime Minister: Shaukat Aziz (until 16 November), Muhammad Mian Soomro (acting) (starting 16 November)
- Chief Justice:
  - until 9 March: Iftikhar Muhammad Chaudhry
  - 9 – 24 March: Javaid Iqbal (acting)
  - 25 March – 20 July: Rana Bhagwandas (acting)
  - 20 July – 3 November: Iftikhar Muhammad Chaudhry
  - starting 3 November: Abdul Hameed Dogar (acting)

=== Governors ===
- Governor of Balochistan – Owais Ahmed Ghani
- Governor of Khyber Pakhtunkhwa – Ali Jan Aurakzai
- Governor of Punjab – Khalid Maqbool (until 16 May); Salmaan Taseer (starting 16 May)
- Governor of Sindh – Ishrat-ul-Ibad Khan

== Events ==
=== January ===
- 26 January
  - United States legislation seeks ban on assistance to Pakistan after it reviewed inconsistencies in the Pakistan's nuclear and missile programmes.
  - Suicide bombing at a Marriott Hotel in Islamabad leaves two dead including the bomber. The bombing happened hours before a Republic Day celebrations were to be hosted at the hotel by the Indian High Commission.
- 27 January – Police chief and 12 others are killed in suicide attack in Peshawar.

=== March ===
- 9 March – President Pervez Musharraf suspends chief justice Iftikhar Muhammad Chaudhry and appoints justice Javaid Iqbal as the acting head of the Supreme Court.

=== May ===
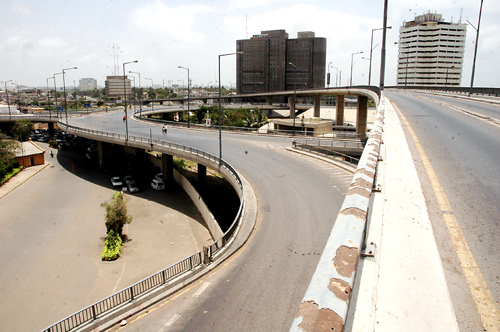
Streets throughout Karachi were left deserted on 12 May 2007 just before the riots broke out resulting in several deaths.

- 12 May – Black Saturday riots break out in Karachi at the arrival of chief justice Iftikhar Chaudhry at the Jinnah International Airport. Gunfights and clashes erupted across the city as Pakistan Peoples Party (PPP) and Awami National Party (ANP) activists who supported the judge and the pro-government Muttahida Qaumi Movement (MQM) activists took to the streets against each other. The clashes continued for several days.

=== June ===
- 23 June – Torrential rainstorms hit the southern province of Sindh and brings floods and destruction to the provincial capital of Karachi; over 200 dead were recovered and several people injured by downed trees and power lines.

=== July ===
- 3 July – Siege of Lal Masjid begins with gunfights erupting between Lal Masjid supporters and Pakistani security forces after 18 months of constant conflict amongst the two parties. Around 125 seminary scholars attack and set fire to government offices near the mosque and take over government positions.
- 14 July – A suicide attack in Miranshah results in the deaths of 24 security personnel with at least 29 people injured.
- 23 July – Muttahida Majlis-e-Amal president Qazi Hussain Ahmed resigns from his seat in the National Assembly quoting that "the parliament [was] being neglected and the whims of an individual [were] being imposed over the country".

=== August ===
- 14 August – Pakistan celebrates 60th years of independence from the British Raj.
- 19 August – A fire raging through the 15-storey building of the Pakistan National Shipping Corporation in Karachi leaves at least two firefighters injured and destroys a large number of valuable documents including official records of the National Engineering Services Pakistan.
- 25 August – Pakistan successfully test-fires a new cruise missile named Hatf-VIII (or Ra'ad) capable of carrying nuclear payloads across a range of 350 km (220 mi).

=== September ===
- 1 September – A suicide attacks results in the deaths of five people, including three security personnel with nine others injured in a Mamund tehsil in Bajaur Agency.
- 4 September – Twin blasts in Rawalpindi, one in a bus another in a market area, kill many and injuring several.
- 6 September – Pakistan's liquid foreign reserves cross 16 billion-dollar mark, despite the outflow of some 133 million dollars in portfolio investment.
- 8 September – Government decides to arrest former prime minister Nawaz Sharif and his brother Shahbaz Sharif upon the arrival of their flight in Islamabad.
- 9 September – Former prime minister Benazir Bhutto announces she would launch Pakistan Peoples Party's new campaign "Food, Clothes, Shelter for the People" upon her return to Pakistan.
- 11 September
  - Suicide bomber kills 18 people in Dera Ismail Khan of Pakistan.
  - Nawaz Sharif is forcibly sent back to Saudi Arabia in a special plane after his six-hour stay at the Islamabad airport when he arrived from London on a PIA flight.
- 13 September – Cabinet of Pakistan unanimously decides to re-elect president Musharraf in uniform from the present assemblies.
- 14 September – Pakistan Peoples Party unanimously decides that Benazir Bhutto will return to Pakistan on 18 October 2007.
- 16 September – Election Commission of Pakistan amends the Presidential Election Rules 1988 ahead of the elections so that Article 63 of the Pakistani constitution no longer applies to the president.
- 18 September – President Musharraf's counsel at the Supreme Court, Sharifuddin Pirzada, says that the general vows to doff uniform after his re-election.
- 20 September
  - Al-Qaeda chief Osama bin Laden calls Musharraf a tyrant and declares war on the government of Pakistan.
  - The Election Commission announces to hold presidential elections on 6 October 2007. Musharraf vows to give up his post as army chief if he is re-elected.
- 24 September – India won the ICC t20 world cup by beating their rivals Pakistan in the final.
- Benazir Bhutto arrives in Washington for a last visit to the US before ending her self-exile.
- 29 September – Pakistani election officials approve Musharraf's nomination for re-election as president, despite efforts to have him disqualified.

=== October ===
- 1 October – The Supreme Court suspends DIG and the deputy commissioner of Islamabad after a suo motu hearing of recent police violence that injured over 50 lawyers and journalists.
- 2 October – More than 80 opposition MPs resign from the parliament in protest of the upcoming presidential election. They challenge Musharraf's eligibility to contest.
- 6 October – Musharraf is re-elected as Pakistan's president, even though his candidacy was heavily criticised.
- 9 October – Pakistani warplanes bombarded suspected pro-Taleban militant positions on Tuesday, as fierce fighting raged near the Afghan border for a fourth day. The army says 45 troops and 150 rebels have died in battles around the town of Mir Ali. Tuesday's air strikes left 50 rebels dead, unconfirmed reports say.
- 11 October – The Pakistan Cricket Board (PCB) bans controversial fast bowler Shoaib Akhtar from playing 13 international matches and fines him ₨ 3.4 million (US$56,000) for hitting his teammate Mohammad Asif with a bat.
- 17 October – Benazir Bhutto returns to Pakistan after eight years of self-exile thronged by a crowd of a million in Karachi to welcome her back.
- 19 October – At least 124 people are killed and 320 injured in the Karachi bombings near the convoy carrying Bhutto.
- 20 October – Karachi police releases a photograph of the suicide bomber who killed at least 130 people in the Karachi bombings.
- 25 October – The Election Commission asks political parties to desist from criticising the army or the judiciary ahead of general elections in 2008.
- 28 October – The Radio Pakistan building on the M. A. Jinnah Road in Karachi is badly damaged in a blaze and the transmissions were suspended for several hours.

=== November ===
- 3 November
  - President Musharraf declares a period of emergency rule amid rising militant violence.
  - Television networks and telephone lines are blocked in various cities across Pakistan.
  - Benazir Bhutto visits Karachi, cutting short her visit to Dubai.
  - Justice Abdul Hameed Dogar takes oath as the new chief justice of the Supreme Court.
  - Militants capture two police stations in Swat.
- 5 November – Pakistan's main stock market index KSE 100 falls nearly 5% to close at 13,279.60 as investors react to the emergency rule imposed by Musharraf. The fall is registered as the biggest one-day decline on the Karachi Stock Exchange index for 16 months.
- 14 November
  - Former cricketer-turned-politician Imran Khan is arrested at the University of the Punjab in Lahore as the state of emergency continues.
  - Pakistan army kills at least 16 Taliban militants in heavy fighting in the Swat Valley.
- 15 November
  - The National Assembly completes its five-year term for the first time in the history of Pakistan.
  - Senate chairman Muhammad Mian Soomro takes oath as the caretaker prime minister after the dissolution of the National Assembly. His appointment came as a surprise to political observers who expressed concerns about the transparency and fairness of the upcoming elections.
- 17 November – Pakistan's biggest private television network, Geo TV, is ordered off air for an unspecified amount of time during the emergency rule. The network had been forced to close down all operations and also halt its transmissions from the United Arab Emirates.
- 18 November
  - Hina Jilani joins a protest in London to ask for the release of political prisoners and Musharraf's resignation.
  - US deputy security of state John Negroponte urges Musharraf to lift the state of emergency and free imprisoned political opponents.
- 19 November
  - Attorney general Malik Qayyum announces that the Supreme Court had dismissed five of the six petitions against Musharraf's re-election.
  - At least 80 people die and 100 are wounded in sectarian violence in Kurram Agency.
- 20 November
  - Thousands of people escape Pakistan's Swat District where the Pakistan Army fights with pro-Taliban militants.
  - More than 100 journalists are arrested for protesting against the state of emergency and media restrictions.
  - The Pakistani government releases 3,400 people who were jailed during the state of emergency.
  - Balochistan Liberation Army chief Mir Balach Marri is said to have been killed by Pakistan's security forces in the bordering regions of Afghanistan; whereas, his brother Sardar Gazain Marri alleges he was killed in an army operation in Balochistan.
- 21 November
  - Imran Khan is released from imprisonment at a jail in Dera Ghazi Khan.
  - Chief justice Iftikhar Muhammad Chaudhry tries to leave his house in Islamabad but is blocked by security forces.
  - Major general Waheed Arshad announces that the Pakistani army has killed 40 pro-Taliban militants in the Shangla District in Swat Valley in the last two days.
- 22 November
  - Pakistan is barred from the Commonwealth of Nations again for its imposition of emergency rule.
  - The Supreme Court dismisses the last remaining petition challenging the dereliction of president Musharraf.
- 23 November
  - The Supreme Court orders the Election Commission to declare Musharraf the winner in the 2007 Pakistani presidential election.
  - Foreign minister Inam-ul-Haq calls Pakistan's suspension from the Commonwealth "unjustified".
- 26 November – Nawaz Sharif announces he will file his nomination papers for the 2008 general elections. However, he denies to serve as prime minister under the Musharraf's presidency.

=== December ===
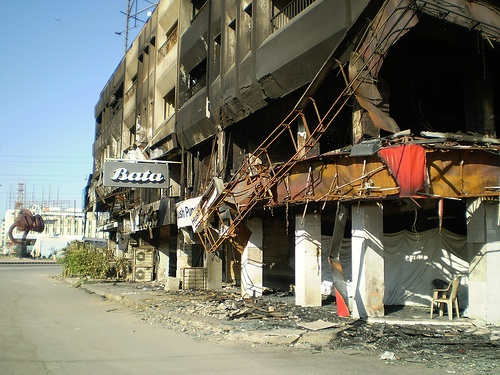
Burned-out buildings in the aftermath of riots in Karachi after Bhutto's assassination.

- 1 December – Benazir Bhutto begins her election campaign for the 2008 general election.
- 3 December – The Election Commission rejects Nawaz Sharif's nomination papers for the upcoming general elections.
- 7 December – Dr Reginald Zahiruddin, secretary of the Church of Pakistan and medical director at a hospital in Bannu, is kidnapped by Taliban militants along with his driver.
- 8 December – Gunmen attack Bhutto's PPP party office in Naseerabad, Karachi, killing three supporters.
- 27 December – Benazir Bhutto is assassinated during an election rally.

== Deaths ==
- 27 December – Benazir Bhutto, politician and Prime Minister of Pakistan (born 1953)

== See also ==
- 2007 in Pakistani television
- List of Pakistani films of 2007
