= List of Pakistani films of 2005 =

List of Pakistani films by year 2005

This is a list of films produced in Pakistan in 2005 (see 2005 in film) and in the Urdu language.

== 2005 ==
Title	Director	Cast	Genre	Notes
2005
Daku Haseena	Darwesh	Sana, khakan, Babur Ali		Also released in Punjabi language (Double version film)
Dekha Pehli Bar	Malik Imdad Hussain	Saima, Saud, Megha, Shafqat Cheema, Naghma, Sardar Kemal		
Ik Gunah Aur	Altaf Hussain	Meera, Moamar, Saud		
Jhalak	Darwesh	Aleena, Yasir, Naghma, Habib		
Khatarnaak		Sana, Shaan, Saud, Shafqat		Also released in Punjabi language (Double version film)
Koi Tujh Sa Kahan	Reema Khan	Irfan Khosat, Veena Malik, Nadeem, Moammar Rana, Reema Khan	Drama	Reema Khan's debut film as a Director and Producer, film was released on August 12, 2005
Kyun Tum Se Itna Pyar Hai	Ajab Gul	Arbaaz Khan, Veena Malik, Ajab Gul, Babrak Shah, Nadeem, Sana	Action	The film was released on April 29, 2005
Mustafa Khan		Saima, Shaan, Resham, Saud		
Naag aur Nagin	Jamshed Naqvi	Saima, Moamar Rana, Veena Malik, Babar Ali, Badar Munir, Shafqat Cheema		
Parcham	Darwesh	Sidra, Shahid Khan, Nemat Sarhadi		
Pyar To Hota Hai	Darwesh	Sidra, Shahid Khan, Nemat Sarhadi		
Sahib Log	Naseem Khan	Saima, Moamar, Nazo, Arbaz		
Saturday Night Special	Darwesh	Sidra, Shahid Khan, Nemat Sarhadi		
Tere Bin Jiya Na Jaye	Imran Malik	Zara Sheikh, Imran Malik, Nadeem, Sherry		

== See also ==
- 2005 in Pakistan
