= 2002 in Pakistan =

- Decades: 1980s; 1990s; 2000s; 2010s; 2020s
- See also: History of Pakistan; List of years in Pakistan; Timeline of Pakistani history

Events from the year 2002 in Pakistan.

== Incumbents ==
=== Federal government ===
- President: Pervez Musharraf
- Prime Minister: Zafarullah Khan Jamali (starting 23 November)
- Chief Justice:
  - until 6 January: Irshad Hasan Khan
  - 6 January-31 January: Bashir Jehangiri
  - starting 1 February: Sheikh Riaz Ahmad

=== Governors ===
- Governor of Balochistan – Amir-ul-Mulk Mengal
- Governor of Khyber Pakhtunkhwa – Iftikhar Hussain Shah
- Governor of Punjab – Khalid Maqbool
- Governor of Sindh – Muhammad Mian Soomro (until 26 December); Ishrat-ul-Ibad Khan (starting 26 December)

== Events ==
=== January ===
- 1 January – an earthquake strikes northern Pakistan.
- 12 January – President Musharraf declares a war on extremism.
- 18 January – President Musharraf, in an interview with CNN, says he believes that Osama bin Laden is dead.

=== March ===
- India shuns Pakistan's offer of talks.

=== June ===
- 22 June – A wedding feast in Pakistan's tribal areas ends in tragedy after an error during the celebratory firing of a mortar shell; fourteen people are killed.

=== October ===
- 10 October - General elections were held to elect the National Assembly of Pakistan and the provincial assemblies.

=== November ===
- 21 November - A 6.3 M_{w} earthquake strikes northern Pakistan, leaving sixteen dead, forty injured, and more than 1,000 buildings damaged.
- 26 November - The Pakistan army has to use helicopters to evacuate thousands of people following the earthquake, as roads are blocked and the temperature is falling due to the onset of winter.

== Deaths ==
- 5 August - Bashir Niaz, film screenwriter
