= 2009 in Pakistan =

- Decades: 1980s; 1990s; 2000s; 2010s; 2020s
- See also: History of Pakistan; List of years in Pakistan; Timeline of Pakistani history

Events from the year 2009 in Pakistan.

== Incumbents ==
=== Federal government ===
- President: Asif Ali Zardari
- Prime Minister: Yousaf Raza Gillani
- Chief Justice: Abdul Hameed Dogar (until 21 March), Iftikhar Muhammad Chaudhry (starting 21 March)

=== Governors ===
- Governor of Balochistan – Nawab Zulfikar Ali Magsi
- Governor of Gilgit-Baltistan – Qamar Zaman Kaira (starting 16 September)
- Governor of Khyber Pakhtunkhwa – Owais Ahmed Ghani
- Governor of Punjab – Salmaan Taseer
- Governor of Sindh – Ishrat-ul-Ibad Khan

== Events ==
=== February ===
- 20 February, A suicide bombing in Dera Ismail Khan killed 32 while injured 157 people.

=== March ===
- 3 March, The Sri Lankan cricket team are attacked in the city of Lahore.
- 6 March, Investigators in Pakistan are tracking down members of Lashkar-e-Taiba in the search for the perpetrators of the Lahore attack.
- 16 March, Prime Minister Yousaf Raza Gillani addressed the nation, restoring the deposed Chief Justice Iftikhar Muhammad Chaudhry and other judges.
- 27 March, a bomb attack in the FATA kills at least 48.
- 30 March, Unidentified gunmen attacked and seized the Manawan Police Academy, which is based in Lahore. At least 18 people were later killed and around 95 others injured in the subsequent storming of the building by the Pakistani security forces.

=== April ===
- 2009 refugee crisis in Pakistan

=== July ===
- On July 3, 2009, Taliban militants Saturday claimed responsibility for a military helicopter crash that killed 41 people in the rugged tribal area in the country's north. However, a military spokesman rejected the claim, reiterating that the helicopter had crashed due to a 'technical fault.' 41 security personnel, including 19 personnel of the paramilitary Frontier Crops, 18 regulars from the army and four crew members, on board a military transport helicopter were killed when it crashed in Chapri Ferozkhel area on the border of Khyber and Orakzai tribal regions on Friday afternoon.

=== August ===
- 1 August, The 2009 Gojra riots began. Militant Islamists attacked Pakistan's Christian minority in a massive anti-Christian pogrom.

=== October ===
- October 5, five people were killed when a suicide bomber dressed in military fatigues walked through the security cordon at the World Food Programme offices of the United Nations in Islamabad.
- October 9, in the busiest bazaar in Peshawar, the capital of the Khyber Pakhtunkhwa province, militants set off a car bomb that killed 48 people.
- October 11, 10 militants dressed in army fatigues and armed with automatic weapons, mines, grenades and suicide jackets breached the perimeter of the army headquarters in Rawalpindi in a raid that left 23 people dead and set off a 20-hour siege.
- October 12, militants launched their fourth assault in a week on strategic targets across Pakistan, this time with a suicide car bombing against a military vehicle in a crowded market in the northwest, killing 41 people and wounding dozens more.

=== December ===
- December 29 – A bombing occurs during the main Jaloos in Karachi in which the Shias were mourning over the Day of Ashura. 43 persons were killed while almost 60 persons were injured.

== Deaths ==
- 20 November – Ghulam Mustafa Jatoi, politician (born 1931)

== See also ==
- 2009 in Pakistani television
- List of Pakistani films of 2009
