= S. H. Hashmi =

Pakistani advertising pioneer (1935–2006)

- Born: 1935; Gaya, Bihar, British India
- Died: 20 March 2006 (aged 70–71); Karachi, Pakistan
- Occupation: Advertising
- Father: Allama Syed Abdul Qudoos Hashmi
- Awards: Sitara-i-Imtiaz (Star of Excellence) Award by the President of Pakistan in 2005; Pride of Performance Award by the Government of Pakistan in 1993

S.H. Hashmi (1935 – 20 March 2006) was a Pakistani advertiser and marketer who was a founding member and managing director of Orient McCann-Erickson. He was one of the pioneers of advertising industry in Pakistan.

== Early life and career ==
S. H. Hashmi was born in Gaya, Bihar, British India in 1935. His father Syed Abdul Qudoos Hashmi was an Islamic scholar.

== Awards and recognition ==
- Sitara-i-Imtiaz (Star of Excellence) award by the President of Pakistan in 2005.
- Pride of Performance award in 1993 by the President of Pakistan.
- 'Millennium Award of Lifetime Achievement' by the All Pakistan Newspapers Society in 2004
- 'Akhbar Dost Award' in 2004 by the All Pakistan Newspapers Society

== Death and survivors ==
Hashmi died at the age of 71 in Karachi after a prolonged illness which was repeatedly complicated with bouts of pneumonia and other complicating factors. He left behind his wife who later died on 24 October 2014, and their two sons, Masood Hashmi and Mahmood Hashmi, and three daughters.
