= 2005 in Pakistan =

- Decades: 1980s; 1990s; 2000s; 2010s; 2020s
- See also: History of Pakistan; List of years in Pakistan; Timeline of Pakistani history

Events from the year 2005 in Pakistan.

== Incumbents ==
=== Federal government ===
- President: Pervez Musharraf
- Prime Minister: Shaukat Aziz
- Chief Justice: Nazim Hussain Siddiqui (until 29 June), Iftikhar Muhammad Chaudhry

=== Governors ===
- Governor of Balochistan – Owais Ahmed Ghani
- Governor of Khyber Pakhtunkhwa – Iftikhar Hussain Shah (until 15 March); Khalilur Rehman (starting 15 March)
- Governor of Punjab – Khalid Maqbool
- Governor of Sindh – Ishrat-ul-Ibad Khan

== Events ==
=== May ===
- 1 May – Japanese Prime Minister Junichiro Koizumi leaves Pakistan after two days of talks with President Pervez Musharraf and Prime Minister Shaukat Aziz – the first by a Japanese PM for five years. At the conclusion of the trip a joint declaration between the two nations announces their commitment to cooperate.

=== October ===
- 5 October – Perpetrators of the racially motivated murder of Glasgow teenager Kriss Donald, extradited to the United Kingdom to face trial in a one-off agreement negotiated with Pakistan.
- 8 October – The 7.6 M_{w} Kashmir earthquake strikes with a maximum Mercalli intensity of VIII (Severe), leaving 86,000–87,351 people dead, 69,000–75,266 injured, and 2.8 million homeless.
- 10 October – The president of Pakistan appeals for international help following the earthquake, saying the country cannot deal with crisis on its own.

=== November ===
- 3 November – Pakistan announces that the official death toll from the quake is over 73,000.

=== December ===
- England complete their tour of Pakistan with a victory against the Pakistan cricket team at Rawalpindi.

== See also ==
- 2005 in Pakistani television
- List of Pakistani films of 2005
