= Mid-life update =

A mid-life update, especially within the defense context, refers to maintenance or renovation aimed at extending an item’s usefulness and capability.

== See also ==
- F-16 mid-life update
