= Surface vessels of the Royal Navy =

One of the five fighting arms of the British Royal Navy

- Country: United Kingdom
- Branch: Royal Navy

Commanders
- Current commander: Commodore Ian Feasey

Insignia
- White Ensign (1901 – present)

- Naval jack

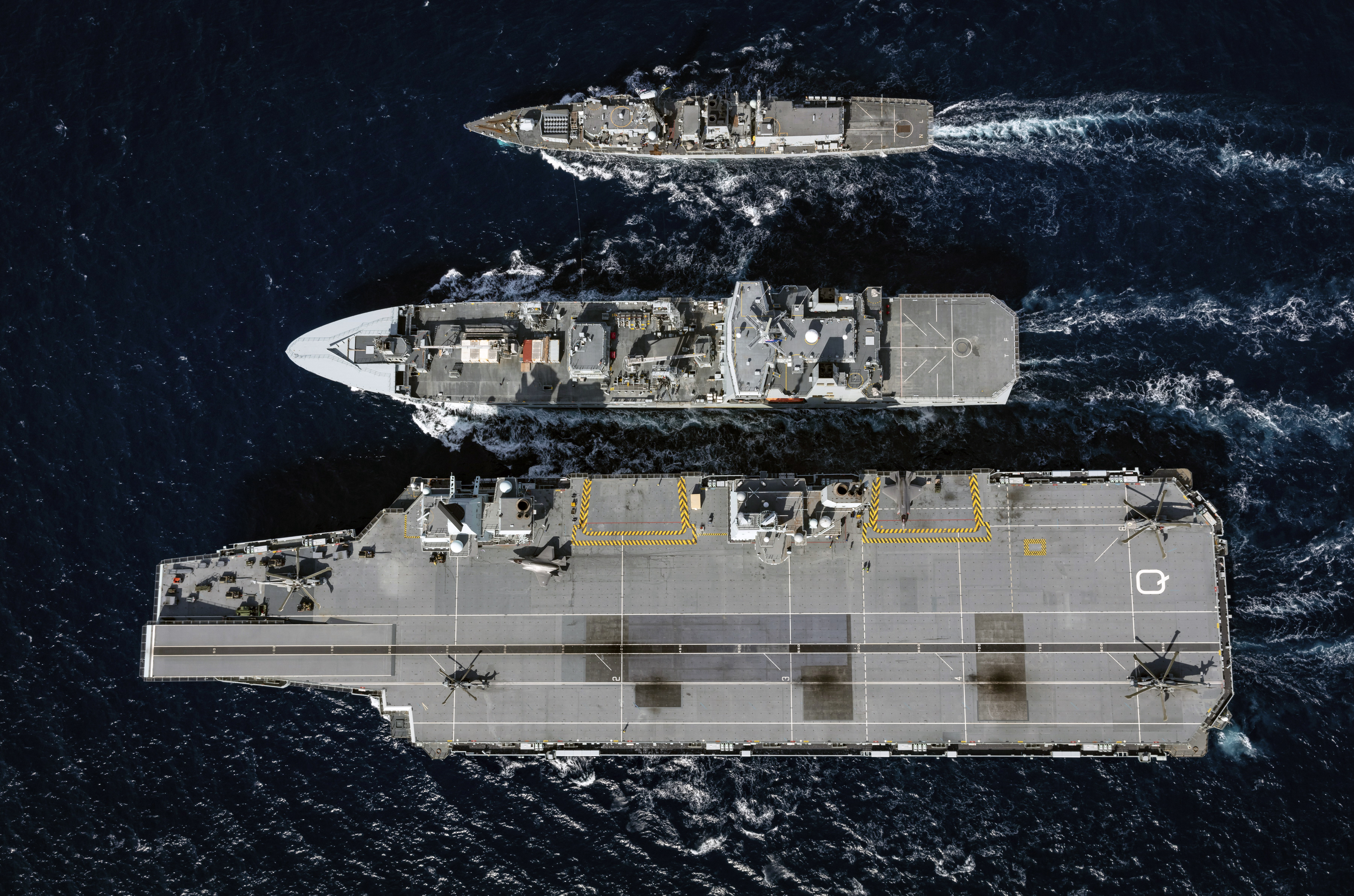
HMS Northumberland, RFA Tideforce and HMS Queen Elizabeth in 2019

Surface vessels form one of the five fighting arms of the Royal Navy.

== History ==
During much of the medieval period, fleets or "king's ships" were often established or gathered for specific campaigns or actions, and these would disperse afterwards. These were generally merchant ships enlisted into service. Unlike some European states, England did not maintain a small permanent core of warships in peacetime. England's naval organisation was haphazard and the mobilization of fleets when war broke out was slow. In the 11th century, Aethelred II had an especially large fleet built by a national levy. During the period of Danish rule in the 11th century, the authorities maintained a standing fleet by taxation, and this continued for a time under Edward the Confessor, who frequently commanded fleets in person.

Royal Navy surface ships currently consist of two flotillas based at HMNB Portsmouth and HMNB Devonport, both located on the south coast of England. Surface combatants range from aircraft carriers to mine countermeasures vessels to offshore patrol vessels, but most are escorts; destroyers (Type 45) and frigates (Type 23).

Surface combatants deploy to conduct several standing Royal Navy deployments. Closer to home, the surface fleet also conducts Fishery Protection Patrols around UK waters, by agreement with the Department for Environment, Food and Rural Affairs (DEFRA).

At some point between 2011 and 2018, Commander United Kingdom Maritime Forces and Rear Admiral Surface Ships was also given the role of Rear-Admiral Surface Ships, the 'tribal chief' of surface ships within the Navy. Commander United Kingdom Carrier Strike Group and Commander Littoral Strike Group are the two main deployable forces, led by Commodores (1* rank) under COMUKMARFOR.

The surface ships were administered by the Commander United Kingdom Strike Force and Rear Admiral Surface Ships (COMUKSTRKFOR or CSF). Commander United Kingdom Maritime Forces is a sea-going combatant command appointment.

One of the most recent Commander United Kingdom Maritime Forces was Rear Admiral Michael Utley.

In 2020-2021, the surface ships were reduced to the status of a Commodore-led flotilla, the Surface Flotilla, under Commander Operations (Royal Navy).

== See also ==
- History of the Royal Navy
- List of active Royal Navy ships
- Standing Royal Navy deployments
