= Khalid Maqbool =

Pakistan Army general

33rd Governor of Punjab
- In office 29 October 2001 – 16 May 2008
- President: General Pervez Musharraf; Asif Ali Zardari
- Prime Minister: Zafarullah Khan Jamali; Chaudhry Shujaat Hussain; Shaukat Aziz; Muhammad Mian Soomro; Yousaf Raza Gillani
- Preceded by: Muhammad Safdar
- Succeeded by: Salmaan Taseer

Personal details
- Born: 1948 (age 77–78) Lyallpur, Punjab, Pakistan
- Education: Pakistan Military Academy; Command and Staff College; National Defence University
- Profession: Military officer
- Awards: Hilal-e-Imtiaz (Military); Hilal-e-Imtiaz (civilian)
- Chief Minister: Chaudhry Pervaiz Elahi

Military service
- Allegiance: Pakistan
- Branch/service: Pakistan Army
- Years of service: 1966–2001
- Rank: Lieutenant general
- Unit: Baloch Regiment
- Commands: Command and Staff College; Corps Commander Lahore; Infantry Division
- Battles/wars: Indo-Pakistani War of 1971
- Post-Retirement Work: Civil Servant and former Governor of the Punjab former National Accountability Bureau

Khalid Maqbool Vohra (Urdu: خالد مقبول) (born 1948) is a Pakistani military officer who served as Governor of Punjab between October 2001 and May 2008. He is the longest-serving governor of Punjab in Pakistani history.

== Early life and education ==
Khalid Maqbool Vohra was born in Lyallpur (now Faisalabad) in 1948. He was commissioned in the Pakistan Army in May 1966 in the 1st War Course in the Baloch Regiment. He is a graduate of the Command and Staff College Quetta, the National Defence College, Rawalpindi and the Naval Postgraduate School, Monterey, California, where he attended the Senior International Defense Management Course. He holds an MSc. in Defense and Strategic studies.

== Military career ==
He saw action with an infantry regiment in 1971 Indo-Pakistani War in the Kashmir Sector. Throughout the 1980s, he was military secretary to General Rahimuddin Khan. During his military career he has held a number of prestigious appointments, including command of a Corps, Infantry Division and Brigade.

He has vast experience of instructional assignments including Chief Instructor at premier institutions of Pakistan for example National Defence College and Command and Staff College, Quetta, where he dealt with matters related to strategy and defence policy at the national level. In addition, he served as the Defence and Military Attaché to the United States for two and half years. From March 1995 to November 1996, he stayed as the Chief Instructor of Armed Forces War College at the then National Defence College, Islamabad.

== Corps Command of Lahore ==
Khalid Maqbool was promoted to the rank of Lt. Gen. on 16 October 1998, and made the corps commander of Lahore in place of Lt Gen Mohammad Akram (who proceeded as QMG), a post he continued till August 2000. He then took over as Chairman of National Accountability Bureau until his retirement from Army in October 2001, when he was sworn in as Governor of Punjab province.

== Political career ==
He was chairman, National Accountability Bureau for over one year before he was sworn in as Governor of the Punjab Province on 29 October 2001. For meritorious services, he is recipient of Hilal-e-Imtiaz. On 15 May 2008, Salmaan Taseer was nominated to be new governor of Punjab replacing Lt. Gen. Khalid Maqbool.

During his tenure in the Governor House his contributions to education and health have been great. He was very respected among his staff. He changed the lives of families of workers that lived in the back area of the Governor house. This was done by building new accommodations and by providing better schooling and basic necessities to the workers. Brig. Ahad Muzzafar Shah was appointed his first Military Secretary from 2001-2004.

Political offices
Preceded by Muhammad Safdar	Governor of Punjab; 2001–2008	Succeeded by Salmaan Taseer
