= 1996 in Pakistan =

- Decades: 1970s; 1980s; 1990s; 2000s; 2010s
- See also: History of Pakistan; List of years in Pakistan; Timeline of Pakistani history

The following lists events that happened during 1996 in Pakistan.

== Incumbents ==
=== Federal government ===
- President: Farooq Leghari
- Prime Minister: Benazir Bhutto
- Chief Justice: Sajjad Ali Shah

=== Governors ===
- Governor of Balochistan – Imran Ullah Khan
- Governor of Khyber Pakhtunkhwa –
  - until 5 November: Khurshid Ali Khan
  - 5 November-11 November: Said Ibne Ali
  - starting 11 November: Arif Bangash
- Governor of Punjab –
  - until 6 November: Raja Saroop Khan
  - 6 November-11 November: Khalilur Rehman
  - starting 11 November: Khawaja Tariq Rahim
- Governor of Sindh – Kamaluddin Azfar

== Events ==
=== March ===
- 17 March – Sri Lanka defeat Australia in Lahore in the finals of the cricket world cup.

== Births ==
- Syed Ali Mujtaba Shah Bokhari was born in April 5, 1996 in Lahore and is a professional squash player who represented Pakistan. He reached a career-high world ranking of World No. 133 in April 2013.
- Ahmed Siddiqui was born in 1996 and He is an American of Pakistani descent who described being kidnapped with his mother and two younger siblings in March 2003.

The repeated bomb blasts in major cities of Punjab during 1995-1996 terrorized people. During the year 1995–96, this state was in great curse and the government was in several dilemmas.

== Deaths ==
In 1996, 2,000 people were killed in Karachi. The PPP, with its own government in Sindh, had the unique opportunity to heal the wounds of ethnic violence in Karachi.

- September 20; Murtaza Bhutto, (born 1954), leader of the opposition party Pakistan Peoples Party (Shaheed Bhutto) killed during a gunfight with police.
- November 21; Abdus Salam, (born 1926), Pakistani Nobel physicist dies in Oxford.
