= 1997 in Pakistan =

- Decades: 1970s; 1980s; 1990s; 2000s; 2010s
- See also: History of Pakistan; List of years in Pakistan; Timeline of Pakistani history

Events from the year 1997 in Pakistan.

== Incumbents ==
=== Federal government ===
- President: Farooq Leghari (until 2 December), Wasim Sajjad (acting) (starting 2 December)
- Prime Minister: Malik Meraj Khalid (until 17 February), Nawaz Sharif (starting 17 February)
- Chief Justice: Sajjad Ali Shah (until 2 December), Ajmal Mian

=== Governors ===
- Governor of Balochistan – Imran Ullah Khan (until 22 April); Miangul Aurangzeb (starting 22 April)
- Governor of Khyber Pakhtunkhwa – Arif Bangash
- Governor of Punjab – Khawaja Tariq Rahim (until 11 March); Shahid Hamid (starting 11 March)
- Governor of Sindh – Kamaluddin Azfar (until 17 March); Moinuddin Haider (starting 17 March)

== Events ==
=== March ===
- 3 February – General elections are held.

=== August ===
- 14 August – Pakistan celebrates 50 years of independence from British rule.

=== November ===
- 13 November – Nawaz Sharif promises US president Bill Clinton he will find those responsible for the killing of four US businessmen and their Pakistani driver.
- 26 November – Pakistan's first motorway linking Islamabad to Lahore is opened.

=== December ===
- 2 December – Pakistan's president, Farooq Leghari, resigns. Wasim Sajjad becomes interim president for the second time.

== Births ==
- 20 May – Shazia Masih, torture victim (died 2010)
- 12 July – Malala Yousafzai, activist for female education

== Deaths ==
- 16 August – Nusrat Fateh Ali Khan, Pakistani Qawwali artist (b. 1948)
