= 1994 in Pakistan =

- Decades: 1970s; 1980s; 1990s; 2000s; 2010s
- See also: History of Pakistan; List of years in Pakistan; Timeline of Pakistani history

Events from the year 1994 in Pakistan.

== Incumbents ==
=== Federal government ===
- President: Farooq Leghari
- Prime Minister: Benazir Bhutto
- Chief Justice:
  - until 14 April: Nasim Hasan Shah
  - 15 April-4 June: Saad Saud Jan
  - starting 5 June: Sajjad Ali Shah

=== Governors ===
- Governor of Balochistan – Abdul Rahim Durrani (until 19 May); Imran Ullah Khan (starting 19 May)
- Governor of Khyber Pakhtunkhwa – Amir Gulistan Janjua (until 26 March); Khurshid Ali Khan (starting 26 March)
- Governor of Punjab – Iqbal Khan (until 26 March); Chaudhary Altaf Hussain (starting 26 March)
- Governor of Sindh – Hakeem Saeed (until 23 January); Mahmoud Haroon (starting 23 January)

== Births ==
- January 01 - M Zunair Saeed, engineer and philanthropist
- January 17 – Sajal Ali, actress and model
- July 2 – Hasan Ali, cricketer
- October 15 – Babar Azam, cricketer
