= 1993 in Pakistan =

- Decades: 1970s; 1980s; 1990s; 2000s; 2010s
- See also: History of Pakistan; List of years in Pakistan; Timeline of Pakistani history

The year 1993 saw political unrest within Pakistan as president Ghulam Ishaq Khan and prime minister Nawaz Sharif duelled for supremacy. Khan dissolved Sharif's government, only for it to be restored by a Supreme Court verdict.

While Pakistan moved closer to peaceful negotiations with Afghanistan, its relationships continued to worsen with India over the Kashmir issue and the 1993 Bombay bombings. Meanwhile, the United States imposes stricter sanctions on Pakistan and any country that traded with Pakistan.

== Incumbents ==
=== Federal government ===
- President
  - Ghulam Ishaq Khan: until 18 July 1993
  - Wasim Sajjad: 18 July – 13 November 1993 (caretaker)
  - Farooq Laghari: since 13 November 1993
- Prime Minister
  - Nawaz Sharif: until 18 April 1993
  - Balakh Sher Mazari: 18 April – 26 May 1993 (caretaker)
  - Nawaz Sharif: 26 May – 18 July 1993
  - Moeenuddin Ahmad Qureshi: 18 August – 19 October 1993 (caretaker)
  - Benazir Bhutto: since 19 October 1993
- Chief Justice: Muhammad Afzal Zullah (until 18 April), Nasim Hasan Shah

=== Governors ===
- Governor of Balochistan – Gul Mohammad Khan Jogezai (until 19 July); Abdur Rahim Durrani (starting 19 July)
- Governor of Khyber Pakhtunkhwa – Amir Gulistan Janjua (until 19 July); Khurshid Ali Khan (starting 19 July)
- Governor of Punjab –
  - until 25 April: Mian Muhammad Azhar
  - 25 April-19 July: Chaudhary Altaf Hussain
  - starting 19 July: Iqbal Khan
- Governor of Sindh – Hakeem Saeed (until 19 July); Mahmoud Haroon (starting 19 July)

== Events ==
=== January ===
- 8 January – The United States decides against branding Pakistan a terrorist nation.
- 9 January – The US president-elect Bill Clinton gives Pakistan six months to refute Indian charges that it is sponsoring international terrorism.

=== February ===
- 5 February – Kashmir Solidarity Day is observed for the very first time in Pakistan.

=== March ===
- 7 March – Political groups from Afghanistan sign the Islamabad Accord in Pakistan, forming a coalition until elections can be held.
- 17 March – Mian Zahid Sarfaraz demands an early dissolution of the National Assembly.
- 27 March – Hamid Nasir Chattha and three other ministers resign from the federal cabinet.

=== April ===
- 2 April – The Pakistan government vows to crack down on Arab militants.
- 4 April
  - India presents evidence implicating Pakistan in the 1993 Bombay bombings.
  - The federal cabinet nominates Ghulam Ishaq Khan as the president for a second term.
  - 3 MNAs resign from the National Assembly.
- 8 April
  - After a crack down on illegal immigrants, hundreds of Arab nationals are arrested on suspected links to Islamic militants.
  - 92 MNAs tender their resignation from the house.
- 13 April – Crack down continues against illegal Arab immigrants to prevent any extremists among them from using Pakistan to foment violence in other countries.
- 18 April
  - President Ghulam Ishaq Khan dissolves the National Assembly, dismissing the Sharif cabinet.
  - Balakh Sher Mazari is appointed the caretaker prime minister.
- 19 April – Federal ministers in the Mazari caretaker ministry are sworn into office and handed ministerial portfolios.

=== May ===
- 23 May – In record busts against drug smugglers in southeastern Balochistan, navy officers seize 132,000 pounds (60 t) of hashish and 440 pounds (200 kg) of heroin.
- 26 May – The Supreme Court restores the National Assembly and prime minister Nawaz Sharif.

=== June ===
- 5–24 June Pakistani soldiers are massacred in Somalia while serving with a UN peacekeeping mission.
- 16 June – Bosnian Muslim refugees leave Croatia for Pakistan.

=== July ===
- 18 July
  - After weeks of negotiations with army chief Gen Abdul Waheed Kakar, both president Khan and prime minister Sharif resign from their posts.
  - Wasim Sajjad becomes the caretaker president.
- 20 July – The US threatens to impose sanctions on China if it continues to ship missiles to Pakistan in defiance of an international agreement.

=== August ===
- 18 August – Moeenuddin Ahmad Qureshi becomes the caretaker prime minister.

=== October ===
- 6 October – General elections are held. PPP wins 86; PML-N secures 72 seats.
- 19 October – Benazir Bhutto becomes the prime minister by 121 votes for a second time.

=== November ===
- 4 November – Police arrest Murtaza Bhutto, the brother of PM Bhutto, moments after his plane landed in Pakistan ending his 16 years in exile.
- 9 November – Fire rages through the National Assembly building, destroying the main chamber. According to PTV, the cause is believed to be an electric short circuit.
- 13 November – Farooq Laghari is sworn in as the eighth elected president of Pakistan.
- 24 November – India and Pakistan agree to resume talks on the Kashmir issue.

=== December ===
- 16 December – Pakistan accuses India of stepping up attacks on civilians in Kashmir.
- 28 December – Pakistan begins a campaign to eradicate polio.

== Births ==
- 4 October – Rehman Khalid, Pakistani baseball pitcher
- 7 November – Haris Rauf, Pakistani cricketer

== Deaths ==
- 8 January – Gen Asif Nawaz dies of a heart attack in Rawalpindi.
- 18 March – Former prime minister Muhammad Khan Junejo dies in a hospital in the United States undergoing treatment for leukaemia.
