= 1995 in Pakistan =

- Decades: 1970s; 1980s; 1990s; 2000s; 2010s
- See also: History of Pakistan; List of years in Pakistan; Timeline of Pakistani history

Events from the year 1995 in Pakistan.

== Incumbents ==
=== Federal government ===
- President: Farooq Leghari
- Prime Minister: Benazir Bhutto
- Chief Justice: Syed Sajjad Ali Shah

=== Governors ===
- Governor of Balochistan – Imran Ullah Khan
- Governor of Khyber Pakhtunkhwa – Khurshid Ali Khan
- Governor of Punjab –
  - until 22 May: Raja Saroop Khan
  - 22 May-19 June: Muhammad Ilyas
  - starting 19 June: Raja Saroop Khan
- Governor of Sindh – Mahmoud Haroon (until 21 May); Kamaluddin Azfar (starting 21 May)

== Events ==
- January - Pakistan became a founding member of the World Trade Organization
- Pakistan invests in the private sector to boost power production.
- June - the government announced policies that backtracked on earlier commitments to reduce the fiscal deficit and lower import tariffs.
- July – The Pakistani embassy in Kabul is attacked.
- December – A bomb blast targeting the Egyptian embassy in Islamabad kills 13.
- First Pakistan Auto Show

== Births ==
- 5 January – Muhammad Tousiq, field hockey player
- 2 February – Arfa Karim, student, world's youngest Microsoft Certified Professional (2004–2008) (died 14 January 2012)
- 10 March – Aima Baig, singer
- 15 October – Diana Baig, female cricketer
- 9 November – Sara Raza Khan, singer
- 12 December – Sami Aslam, cricketer
- 10 October – Kamran Ghulam, cricketer, who scored a century on his Test debut against England in Multan in October 2024.
- 28 December – Mohammad Abubakar Durrani, canoeist

== Deaths ==
- April 16 – Iqbal Masih, born 1983, children's right activist
