= 2015 in Pakistan =

- Decades: 1990s; 2000s; 2010s; 2020s
- See also: History of Pakistan; List of years in Pakistan; Timeline of Pakistani history

The following lists events that happened during 2015 in Pakistan.

== Incumbents ==
=== Federal government ===
- President: Mamnoon Hussain
- Prime Minister: Nawaz Sharif
- Chief Justice:
  - until 16 August: Nasir-ul-Mulk
  - 17 August-10 September: Jawwad S. Khawaja
  - starting 10 September: Anwar Zaheer Jamali

== Events ==
=== January ===
- January 4 – Insurgency in Khyber Pakhtunkhwa
  - A United States airstrike kills 8 Uzbek people claimed to be linked with al-Qaeda.
  - The Pakistan Air Force strikes Pakistani Taliban positions in Khyber Agency killing 31 militants.
  - A bomb detonates at a volleyball match in Orakzai Agency killing four people and injuring eight.
- January 10
  - A suicide bomb attack on a Shiite mosque in Rawalpindi kills at least seven people.
  - A traffic accident between an oil tanker and passenger coach en route to Shikarpur from Karachi on the Pakistan National Highway Link Road near Gulshan-e-Hadeed, Karachi, results in at least 57 dead and scores injured.
- January 25 – A massive blackout strikes Pakistan, leaving as much as 80 percent of the country without electricity at its height as officials rush to restore power.

=== February ===
- February 13 – Pakistan announces the arrest of twelve Tehrik-i-Taliban Pakistan terrorists for their alleged involvement in the 2014 Peshawar school massacre.
- February 13 – Police and Taliban terrorists exchange gunfire in Peshawar after an explosion is reported at a nearby Shia mosque.
- February 17 – A bomb in a Shi'ite mosque in the Pakistani city of Rawalpindi kills at least two people and injures six.

=== March ===
- March 15 – A bombing of a church in Lahore kills at least eleven people with 48 more injured.
- March 23 –
  - 2015 Pakistan Day Parade
  - The Pakistan Army claims to have killed 80 Tehrik-i-Taliban Pakistan fighters in fighting in Khyber Pakhtunkhwa in recent days while the Taliban claims to have killed at least six soldiers.

=== April ===
- April 5 – Suspected murderer and fugitive Gul Ahmad Saeed kills his fiancé and nine of her relatives. The previous year he had killed his family for objecting to their marriage.

=== May ===
- May 13 - Karachi Bus Shooting Massacre
  - eight gunmen attacked a bus traveling in Safoora Goth, Karachi, Sindh in Pakistan. The shooting left at least 46 people dead. All of the victims were of the Ismaili Shia Muslim minority, suggesting the attack was a targeted killing of sectarian nature.
- May 19 – Zimbabwe Cricket Team toured Pakistan to play International Cricket Series. It was the first tour by a Test-playing nation since the attack on the Sri Lankan cricket team in 2009.
- May 22 – First T20 Match was played between Pakistan And Zimbabwe at Gaddafi Stadium in Lahore. Tickets for both of the T20 matches sold out within two days, with 60,000 people attending the first game.
- 20 May – 2015 Khyber Pakhtunkhwa local elections

=== August ===
- August 14 – People of Pakistan celebrated 69th independence day of their country on 14 August.

=== September ===
- September 6 – People of Pakistan celebrated Defense day of their country on 06 Sep.

=== December ===
- December 29 – the Mardan suicide bombing killed 26 people and wounded more than 50 others.

== Economy ==
- 2014–15 Pakistan federal budget
- 2015–16 Pakistan federal budget

== Sport ==
=== Cricket ===
International

- Pakistani cricket team in New Zealand in 2014–15
- Zimbabwean cricket team in Pakistan in 2015

Domestic

- 2015 Haier Super 8 T20 Cup
- 2014–15 Haier T20 Cup

=== Football ===
- 2014–15 Pakistan Premier League

== Deaths ==
- February 23 – Justice Rana Bhagwandas
- May 12 – Saulat Mirza, murderer (b. 1971; executed)

== See also ==
- Timeline of Pakistani history
- 2015 in Pakistani television
- List of Pakistani films of 2015
