= 1992 in Pakistan =

- Decades: 1970s; 1980s; 1990s; 2000s; 2010s
- See also: History of Pakistan; List of years in Pakistan; Timeline of Pakistani history

1992 was a year mixed with euphoria and tragedy for Pakistan. While Pakistan won the finals of the Cricket World Cup, thousands died in the flooding that occurred in the northern regions of Pakistan as a result of torrential rains swelling the Indus river. The Nawaz government inaugurated a few projects in the province of Punjab towards the betterment of road networks and ordered a military operation in the province of Sindh to counter the growing language riots and ethnic tension.

== Incumbents ==
=== Federal government ===
- President: Ghulam Ishaq Khan
- Prime Minister: Nawaz Sharif
- Chief Justice: Muhammad Afzal Zullah

=== Governors ===
- Governor of Balochistan – Gul Mohammad Khan Jogezai
- Governor of Khyber Pakhtunkhwa – Amir Gulistan Janjua
- Governor of Punjab – Mian Muhammad Azhar
- Governor of Sindh – Mahmoud Haroon

== Events ==
- 12 January – Lahore-Islamabad motorway project launched.
- 22 February – Nawaz Sharif introduces yellow-cab taxi scheme.
- 26 April – Pakistan's Alam Channa enters Guinness Book of World Records as the tallest man in the world.
- 20 May – A 6.0 magnitude earthquake affects northern Pakistan causing moderate damage, killing 36 and injuring 100.
- 19 June – Military operation starts in Sindh.
- 8 September – 1992 India–Pakistan floods, almost 1,000 people die and 3 million are evacuated due to flooding in Punjab province caused by torrential rains swelling the Indus river and its tributaries, a thousand more are also killed in the Kashmir region.
- 28 September – Pakistan International Airlines Flight 268, an Airbus A300B4-203, crashes into the southern slope of the Chure Hills on approach to Tribhuvan International Airport in Kathmandu, Nepal, killing all 167 passengers and crew.

== Sports ==
=== Cricket ===
- 25 March – Pakistan defeats England by 22 runs in Melbourne in the finals of the 1992 Cricket World Cup.

== Births ==
- 2 January – Manzoor Ahmed, footballer
- 9 March – Farhan Zaman, squash player
- 14 April – Mohammad Amir, cricketer
- 15 April – Rabia Ashiq, athlete
- 1 June – Mohammad Rizwan, cricketer
- 21 June – Kainat Imtiaz, cricketer
- 8 July – Raza Hasan, first-class cricketer
- 9 July – Muhammad Adil, footballer
- 28 September – Mawra Hocane, actress and model
- 10 October – Humaira Asghar, actress and model (died 2024)
- 4 November – Alycia Dias, singer

== Deaths ==
- 25 January – Mir Khalil ur Rehman.
- 20 February – Muhammad Asad.
- 5 March – Jam Sadiq Ali.
- 17 June – Ishrat Hussain Usmani.
- 8 May – Gul Mohammad.
- 9 July – Mujaddid Ahmed Ijaz.
- 27 October – Nayyar Sultana.
