= 2011 in Pakistan =

- Decades: 1990s; 2000s; 2010s; 2020s
- See also: History of Pakistan; List of years in Pakistan; Timeline of Pakistani history

Events in the year 2011 in Pakistan.

== Incumbents ==
=== Federal government ===
- President – Asif Ali Zardari
- Prime Minister – Yousaf Raza Gillani
- Commerce Minister – Ameen Faheem
- Minister of Communications – Arbab Alamgir Khan
- Culture Minister – Khawaja Saad Rafique
- Defence Minister – Ahmad Mukhtar
- Minister of Defence Production – Rana Tanveer Hussain
- Finance Minister – Abdul Hafeez Shaikh
- Minister of Foreign Affairs – Hina Rabbani Khar
- Interior Minister – Rehman Malik
- Minister for States and Frontier Regions – Najmuddin Khan
- Minister for Water and Power – Raja Pervaiz Ashraf
- Chief Justice – Iftikhar Muhammad Chaudhry

=== Governors ===
- Governor of Balochistan – Nawab Zulfikar Ali Magsi
- Governor of Gilgit-Baltistan – Wazir Baig (until 27 January); Pir Karam Ali Shah (starting 27 January)
- Governor of Khyber Pakhtunkhwa – Owais Ahmed Ghani (until 9 February); Syed Masood Kausar (starting 9 February)
- Governor of Punjab –
  - until 4 January: Salmaan Taseer
  - 4 January-13 January: Rana Muhammad Iqbal
  - starting 13 January: Latif Khosa
- Governor of Sindh – Ishrat-ul-Ibad Khan

== Events ==
=== January ===
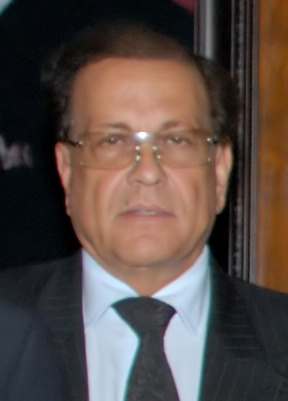
Salmaan Taseer, governor of Punjab was shot in January.

- January 3: The government enters into urgent talks with opposition parties after the Muttahida Qaumi Movement resigns from the coalition, depriving it of its majority.
- January 4: Salmaan Taseer, the governor of Punjab, is shot by one of his bodyguards near his home. Taseer dies of his wounds soon afterwards. His killer, Malik Mumtaz Qadri, turns himself in and claims he killed the governor due to his opposition to the blasphemy law in Pakistan.
- January 11: Internationally acclaimed Pakistani painter and Pride of Performance winner Prof. A. R. Nagori passes away
- January 13: a reporter of Geo News, Wali Khan Babar is shot by unknown political gunmen in Karachi as target killing once again gripped the city.
- January 19: The 7.2 M_{w} Dalbandin earthquake shook a remote region of Balochistan with a maximum Mercalli intensity of VI (Strong), causing moderate damage, leaving three dead and several injured.
- January 25: At least thirteen people are killed while 70 others injured in a suicide bomb explosion in a mourning procession of Imam Hussain near its concluding point at Kerbala Gamay Shah at Bhat Gate in Lahore.
- January 25: A suicide bomber rammed his explosive-laden motorbike into a police van at Malir 15 area of Karachi, killing at least three people while 5 people were injured.
- January 27: A US diplomat, Raymond Davis, kills two men on a motorbike in Lahore allegedly in self-defence while a companion of the diplomat, who is also an American citizen, crushed to death a bike rider in a hit-and-run incident, following the shooting.

=== March ===
- March 1: The Minister for Minority Affairs, Shahbaz Bhatti, a Christian was assassinated in Islamabad
- March 30: Pakistan plays Cricket World Cup semi-final with India.
- March 30: Famous Comedian Liaquat Soldier dies.

=== April ===
- April 22: Internationally renowned Pakistani actor, Moin Akhtar, dies at the age of 60 years in Karachi after suffering from a heart attack.

=== May ===
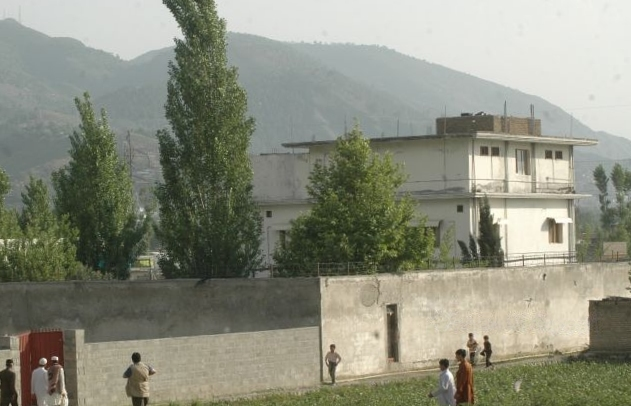
Osama bin Laden's compound

- May 2: Death of Osama bin Laden: The US Navy Seals killed Osama bin Laden in the city of Abbottabad.
- May 24: Hakim Ali Zardari, father of President Asif Ali Zardari died at the age of 81 years at a private ward in the Pakistan Institute of Medical Sciences Hospital in Islamabad.

=== June ===
- June 24 – The cell phone of Osama bin Laden's courier is reported to contain contacts with Harakat-ul-Mujahadeen, suggesting potential ties to Pakistan's intelligence agencies

=== July ===
- During the months of July and August 2011, a number of targeted killings in Karachi, Pakistan left hundreds of people dead. The attacks are part of an ongoing terrorist campaign of political, ethnic and religious violence that has gripped the city in its worst form in the recent years. By late August and September 2011 the security situation in Karachi has stabilized and target killings have largely stopped, though isolated incidents still occur.

=== August ===
- August 11 – 2011 Sindh floods

=== November ===
- November 22: Husain Haqqani resigned as Pakistan Ambassador to the United States following claims of his alleged affiliation with the Memogate controversy.
- November 26: A NATO attack on two Pakistani border checkposts in Salala in the Baizai subdivision of Mohmand Agency in FATA kill 24 soldiers of the Pakistan Army.

== Sport ==
- The 2011 Cricket World Cup was held in India, Sri Lanka and Bangladesh.

== Deaths ==
- 4 January – Salmaan Taseer, 64, governor of Punjab, shot dead
- 10 January – Naseerullah Babar, 82, soldier and politician, Governor of Khyber Pakhtunkhwa (1976–1977) and Interior Minister (1993–1996).
- 11 January – Prof. A. R. Nagori, 71, renowned Pakistani artist.
- 13 January – Babar, 28, journalist and reporter, shot dead.
- 22 January – Aslam Khokhar, 91, cricketer.
- 23 January – Colonel Imam, who was kidnapped along with former ISI official Khalid Khawaja, British journalist Asad Qureshi and his driver in the tribal belt on March 26 last year, died due to a heart attack in the custody of his captors. (body found on this date)
- 2 March
  - Shahbaz Bhatti, Federal Minister for Minority Affairs
  - Saadat Khiyali, journalist, columnist and trade union leader
- 22 April – Moin Akhtar, 60, acclaimed Pakistani actor.
- 2 May – Usama bin Laden, 54, Saudi terrorist.

== Holidays ==
These holidays were held in some provinces of Pakistan.

- 5 January – All educational institutions, offices and banks remained closed in Punjab province to mourn the death of Salmaan Taseer.
- 19 January – The Sindh government had declared January 19 (Wednesday) a provincial holiday on account of the Urs of Shah Abdul Latif Bhitai.
- 25 January – The Sindh government declared a provincial holiday on the account of Chelum of Imam Hussain.

== See also ==
- Terrorist incidents in Pakistan in 2011
- 2011 in Pakistani television
- List of Pakistani films of 2011
