= 2014 in Pakistan =

- Decades: 1990s; 2000s; 2010s; 2020s
- See also: History of Pakistan; List of years in Pakistan; Timeline of Pakistani history

Events in the year 2014 in Pakistan.

== Incumbents ==
=== Federal government ===
- President: Mamnoon Hussain
- Prime Minister: Nawaz Sharif
- Chief Justice: Tassaduq Hussain Jillani (until July 6), Nasir-ul-Mulk

=== Governors ===
- Governor of Balochistan – Muhammad Khan Achakzai
- Governor of Gilgit-Baltistan – Pir Karam Ali Shah
- Governor of Khyber Pakhtunkhwa – Shaukatullah Khan
- Governor of Punjab – Mohammad Sarwar
- Governor of Sindh – Ishrat-ul-Ibad Khan

== Events ==
=== January ===
- January 1 – A bomb blasted on the Qambrani road in Akhtarabad, Quetta near a bus, which was carrying at least 50 pilgrims from Iran to Pakistan. Police confirmed that three of the passengers are killed and at least twenty-four injured.
- January 6 – A bomb detonates in a tribal elder's home in Khyber Agency, killing 10 people and injuring another 9.
- January 9–14-year-old boy Aitizaz Hassan in northern Pakistan is killed stopping a suicide bomber at the main gate of his school but saves the lives of all of his schoolmates gathered for their morning assembly. The Sunni group Lashkar-e-Jhangvi claims responsibility for the attack.
- January 10 – A car suicide-bomb was blasted by Tehrik-i-Taliban Pakistan near the car of a senior police officer Chaudhry Aslam Khan, in which Khan was killed with two others.
- January 11 – Aitizaz Hassan is nominated for an award by Nawaz Sharif.
- January 11 – A ten-year-old servant girl is tortured to death in Punjab raising concerns about human rights in Pakistan.
- January 19 – A bomb attack on an army convoy in the city of Bannu kills at least 20 soldiers.
- January 20 – A suicide bomber blows himself up near Pakistan's military headquarters in Rawalpindi killing at least 13 people.
- January 20 – The United Kingdom rejects its involvement in combat drone attacks by the United States in Pakistan.
- January 20 – War in North-West Pakistan
  - Pakistani military aircraft bomb suspected Taliban hideouts killing 25 militants in North Waziristan.
  - A bomb rips through a bus full of Shi'ite pilgrims in western Pakistan killing at least 22 people.
- January 31 – A bomb kills three Pakistan Army soldiers and injures four others in the restive province of Balochistan.

=== February ===
- February 9 – An exchange of gunfire on the border between the Pakistani states of Sindh and Balochistan kills at least nine people.
- February 9 – Gunmen attack an Islamic religious gathering in Karachi, killing 8 people.
- February 11 – At least 11 people are killed after a grenade is thrown into a movie theatre in the city of Peshawar.
- February 12 – Militants in northwestern Pakistan kill nine male family members of a slain leader of a pro-government militia in an attack on the family's house outside the city of Peshawar.
- February 13 – At least eight police officers are killed in a suicide bomb attack in Karachi.
- February 16 – A bomb derails a train in southwest Pakistan killing 8 people.
- February 17 – Tehrik-i-Taliban Pakistan say they have killed 23 captured Pakistani security force members, in a setback to peace talks aimed at ending the Islamist insurgency.
- February 17 – Former president Pervez Musharraf appeared in front of a civil court for the first time.
- February 21 – Pakistan vs India Match was played on ICC T20 2014 CUP

=== March ===
- March 1 – A bomb killed at least 11 people and another 10 injured in Federally Administered Tribal Areas.
- March 1 – War in North-West Pakistan
  - A bomb attack on a polio vaccination team in a village in Khyber Pakhtunkhwa Province kills at least ten people.
  - The Pakistan Taliban announces a one-month ceasefire aimed at reviving peace talks.
- March 2 – Pakistani military bombs the hideout of a Taliban militant leader killing five insurgents.
- March 3 – Young men with guns open fire at a local court in Islamabad, resulting in at least 11 deaths and 22 injuries.
- March 14 – Attacks all across Pakistan leave dozens dead, with the most violence centered in Peshawar and Quetta.
- March 22 – At least 35 people die in Balochistan, in a collision between a petrol tanker and two buses.
- March 31 – A Pakistani court charges former President Pervez Musharraf with high treason in relation to the imposition of the emergency rule in 2007.

=== April ===
- April 3 – Former President of Pakistan Pervez Musharraf survives an assassination attempt in Islamabad. There are no reports of injuries.
- April 8 – A bomb detonates on a rail car in Sibi, killing 13 people and injuring another 35.
- April 9 – A bomb blast in a market kills 26 people in the outskirts of Islamabad.
- April 11 – Two rival factions of the Tehrik-i-Taliban Pakistan clash in Waziristan, leaving 12 insurgents dead.
- April 12 – Gunmen kidnap 100 men from a tribal gathering in North-West Pakistan.
- April 13 – 73 people are released from captivity by the Taliban, a day after they were kidnapped.
- April 17 – The Tehrik-i-Taliban Pakistan announces that it will not extend a ceasefire with the Pakistani government.
- April 22 – Nine people are killed and dozens wounded in two separate bomb and gun attacks in north west Pakistan.
- April 25 – A bomb detonates in Karachi, killing 4 people and wounding 25.

=== May ===
- May 7 – An alleged American FBI agent is arrested for carrying ammunition while trying to board a flight, which is in violation of Pakistan's anti-terror laws.
- May 8 – A roadside bomb near the Afghan border in North Waziristan, kills 8 Pakistani soldiers.
- May 9 – Geo TV transmission banned by the government
- May 21 – Pakistan Air Force fighter jets bomb suspected militant hideouts in North Waziristan, killing approximately 60 militants and injuring another 30.
- May 27 – A Pakistani woman is stoned to death with bricks outside a courthouse by family members including her father, two brothers, and ex-fiancé for marrying a man she loved against the family's wishes.
- May 28 – A split emerges in the Tehrik-i-Taliban Pakistan after the Mehsud faction walked out, saying the group leaders' tactics were "un-Islamic".
- May 31 – Taliban insurgents from Afghanistan attack a Pakistani border post in the Bajur tribal area, resulting in the deaths of 14 militants and one soldier.

=== June ===
- June 4 – A suicide bomber detonates his explosives near a military vehicle in Islamabad, killing 5 people.
- June 5 – Pakistani police arrest multiple people involved in the stoning of Farzana Parveen, bringing the total number of people in custody to 12.
- June 6 – Ashiqullah Mehsud, a senior commander in the Tehrik-i-Taliban Pakistan, is shot and killed by unknown assailants, speculated to be from the Mehsud splinter group, in the village of Urmuz in the North Waziristan region.
- June 8 – At least 24 people were killed when militants attacked a bus carrying Shia pilgrims from Iran to Quetta in Balochistan province of Pakistan.
- June 8 – Gunmen attack Karachi's Jinnah International Airport resulting in at least 13 deaths and leading to all flights to and from the airport being cancelled.
- June 9 – 2014 Jinnah International Airport attack
  - Karachi's Jinnah International Airport will resume services after yesterday's attack which claimed 21 lives.
  - The Tehrik-i-Taliban Pakistan claims responsibility for the attack.
- June 10 – 2014 Jinnah International Airport attack
  - The Pakistan Air Force conducts bombing raids against Tehrik-i-Taliban Pakistan positions in the Tirah region killing at least 15 militants in response to the Jinnah International Airport attack in Karachi.
  - Gunmen attack a training facility near the Jinnah International Airport.
- June 11 – Tirah air strike
  - At least 25 suspected militants were killed and 15 injured when military planes bombed their hideouts in Tirah valley of Khyber Agency.
- June 11 – Five killed in separate clashes near Swat Valley
  - In the first incident, unidentified men fired at a car in the Kooza Bandi village of Swat Valley, killing three people including a police guard.
  - In a separate incident, up to six militants stormed a checkpoint in the northwestern town of Dargai, that lies in the Malakand region neighbouring Swat. Two Levies personnel were killed in the attack, Express News reported.
- June 12 – At least ten more militants are killed in a suspected United States drone attack in North Waziristan.
- June 15 – War in North-West Pakistan
  - Airstrikes in the northwestern tribal area bordering Afghanistan kill as many as 100 militants.
  - Abu Abdur Rehman Almani, the alleged mastermind behind 2014 Jinnah International Airport attack, is killed during air strikes carried out by Pakistan Air Force.
  - Pakistan formally launches military operation against the insurgents in North Waziristan.
- June 16 – The Pakistan Air Force conducts airstrikes against 6 Tehrik-i-Taliban Pakistan positions in North Waziristan, killing 27 militants.
- June 17 – Clashes in Lahore between the Punjab Police and Pakistan Awami Tehreek activists results in several protesters being killed by police gunfire.
- June 29 – The Islamic Festival of Ramzan started in Pakistan.

=== July ===
- July 1–28 – The Islamic Festival of Ramzan was ongoing in Pakistan
- July 29–31 – Eid ul Fitar was celebrated

=== August ===
- August 4 – 2014 Kulachi, Dera Ismail Khan Bomb Blast, Faqir Jamshed Ahmed Khan, the crown-prince of Noori Darbar Kulachi, falls prey to a remote controlled IED
- August 13 – The process of Long March and Sit-In started by PTI and PAT
- August 14 – Pakistan's 67th dependence day was celebrated during Long March from Lahore to Islamabad
- August 15 – 2014 Quetta Airbase attack, 12 militants, and 11 persons injured after a failed attack on PAF bases in Quetta
- August 16 – Sit-In started outside the Parliament house by PTI and PAT
- August 26 – Javed Hashmi got separate from Sit-In by PTI

=== September ===
- September 1 – Pakistani protesters armed with sticks and stones clash with police in the centre of Islamabad after protests calling for the resignation of Prime Minister Nawaz Sharif turn violent. All schools in the capital have been closed as a result of the clashes.
- September 1 – The Pakistan Television Corporation goes off air after protesters storm its headquarters.
- September 2 – Date of birth of Jahanzaib Mirza (A renowned Engineer and Advocate).
- September 4 – Monsoon rains in Pakistan kill more than 40 people.
- September 9 – The death toll from the floods rises to at least 205 in Pakistan and 200 in India.
- September 9 – At least nine people are killed as a roof collapses in a mosque in the low income neighbourhood of Daroghawala in Lahore.
- September 10 – The Chenab River overflows its banks threatening Jhang District.
- September 11 – A ban is imposed on Saeed Ajmal by ICC.
- September 13 – One month has been completed for Sit-In of PTI and PAT.
- September 21 – PTI's one of the bigger Seminar hold in Karachi.
- September 22 – Javed Hashmi challenged Shah Mehmood Qureshi to fought election from NA-149 Multan.
- September 23 – Three people are killed in a bombing in Peshawar.
- September 28 – At least 21 militants are killed in airstrikes and a gunfight in Pakistan's northwestern tribal areas.

=== October ===
Multan Tragedy October 2014

- October 10 – Activist Malala Yousafzai becomes just the second Pakistani to win Nobel Peace Prize for her struggle to voice girls right to education.

=== November ===
- November 2 – More than 60 people were killed and more than 110 people were injured in a suicide attack on the Pakistan side of the Wagah border. (2014 Wagah border suicide attack)
- November 3 - To boost the morale of the nation, Punjab Rangers allowed people on Monday to attend the flag-lowering ceremony at the Wagah border, a day after the devastating suicide attack that left 62 people dead. Defying the threat posed by terrorists, a good number of people, including women and children, thronged the Wagah border to witness the ceremony.
- November 10 – At least four policemen are killed and another four are wounded in separate attacks in Karachi and Rawalpindi.
- November 11 – A gunfight and two bombings leave at least 15 militants and 5 soldiers dead.
  - 58 people are killed in a bus crash in the Sukkur District in Sindh province.
- November 28 – Gul Ahmad Saeed murdered his parents, brother, and sister-in-law when they obstructed his marriage and goes on the run. He would eventually be suspected of 14 murders.

=== December ===
- December 16 – 2014 Peshawar school attack: Taliban gunmen storm a military-run Army Public Schools in Peshawar, killing at least 141, including 132 children and nine employees, with most of five hundred students evacuated. The shooting ends with all seven gunmen dead.
- December 17 – Pakistan lifts the moratorium on the death penalty for terror-related cases following the Taliban's assault on a school in Peshawar on 16 December that killed 141, including 132 children.
  - All Parties Conference (APC) on December 16, 2014 at Peshawar.
    - Pakistan Tehreek-e-Insaf end their sit-in after 126 days, after Peshawar school attack.

== Economy ==
- 2014 Pakistan federal budget

== Science and technology ==
- Pakistan Remote Sensing Satellite

== Sport ==
=== Cricket ===
International

- Pakistan played in the T20I World cup 2014 and was restricted to the group stage for the first time in T20I World cups, due to the defeat against West Indies by 84 runs (which is a worst defeat for any team). Before the World Cup, they also played Asia cup 2014 and reached to final and lost by 5 wickets.

=== Olympics ===
- Pakistan at the 2014 Summer Youth Olympics
- Pakistan at the 2014 Winter Olympics
- Pakistan at the 2014 Asian Beach Games

== Deaths ==
- January 6 – Aitzaz Hasan, 15, student, bomb blast.
- January 9 – Chaudhry Aslam Khan, 53, police chief and SSP of the Crime Investigation Department in Sindh Police, bomb blast.

== See also ==
- 2014 in Pakistani television
- List of Pakistani films of 2014
