= 1991 in Pakistan =

- Decades: 1970s; 1980s; 1990s; 2000s; 2010s
- See also: History of Pakistan; List of years in Pakistan; Timeline of Pakistani history

1991 in Pakistan was characterized by political and economic readjustment. In 1990 Nawaz Sharif was elected prime minister after the incumbent Benazir Bhutto faced corruption charges, and in 1991 she sought to delegitimize his election. Although the end of United States foreign aid in October 1990 affected the economy, Pakistan’s GDP nonetheless rose 5.6% and exports and foreign investment grew over the 1990-1991 fiscal year. The government also planned to privatize the industrial and financial sectors.

== Incumbents ==
=== Federal government ===
- President: Ghulam Ishaq Khan
- Prime Minister: Nawaz Sharif
- Chief Justice: Muhammad Afzal Zullah

=== Governors ===
- Governor of Balochistan – Musa Khan (until 12 March); Gul Mohammad Khan Jogezai (starting 13 July)
- Governor of Khyber Pakhtunkhwa – Amir Gulistan Janjua
- Governor of Punjab – Mian Muhammad Azhar
- Governor of Sindh – Mahmoud Haroon

== Events ==
- 1991 – Pakistan and India sign the Rail Communication Agreement, also known as the "Samjhauta Express agreement".
- 1991 – Pakistan launches "Pakistan Antarctic Programme" and sends an expedition of scientists to Antarctica.
- 1991 – Retirement of the famed International Pakistani hockey player, Zahid Shareef.

=== June ===
- 5 June – In the Enforcement of Shari’ah Act, the government is given control over the actions of the Muslim population under Islamic law, also known as Shari'ah Law

=== October ===
- 2 October – The Punjab subordinate judiciary service tribunal act is passed.

=== December ===
- A train travelling from Karachi to Lahore hits a parked freight train at Ghotki, killing over 100 of the 800 passengers.

== Births ==
- 15 January – Rubab Raza, swimmer
- 6 February – Sarah Mahboob Khan.
- 16 March – Hammad Azam, cricketer.
- 21 September - Shamoon Ismail, singer/songwriter
- 25 November – Muhammad Rizwan Jr.

== Deaths ==
- Mahmood Hussain, cricketer.
- Fazle Haq, army general

== See also ==
- List of Pakistani films of 1991
