= 1998 in Pakistan =

- Decades: 1970s; 1980s; 1990s; 2000s; 2010s
- See also: History of Pakistan; List of years in Pakistan; Timeline of Pakistani history

Events from the year 1998 in Pakistan.

== Incumbents ==
=== Federal government ===
- President: Wasim Sajjad (acting) (until 1 January), Muhammad Rafiq Tarar (starting 1 January)
- Prime Minister: Nawaz Sharif
- Chief Justice: Ajmal Mian

=== Governors ===
- Governor of Balochistan – Miangul Aurangzeb
- Governor of Khyber Pakhtunkhwa – Arif Bangash
- Governor of Punjab – Shahid Hamid
- Governor of Sindh – Moinuddin Haider

== Events ==
- The fifth census of Pakistan is compiled.
- The Australian cricket team begin their first successful tour
- May 28 – The first nuclear test — Codename Chagai-I — was conducted and supervised by the Pakistan Atomic Energy Commission (PAEC) on May 28, 1998 Ras Koh Chaghi, Baluchistan.
- May 30 – The second nuclear test — Codename Chagai-II — was conducted and supervised by the Pakistan Atomic Energy Commission (PAEC) on May 30, 1998.
- Japan and other nations to impose economic sanctions.
- Pakistan celebrates Youm-e-Takbir annually.

== Movie ==
- Choorian - one of the highest grossing film of all times in Pakistan was released.
- Pakistani films of 1998

== Music ==
- Azadi album was released in India in February 1998 by EMI.
- Dosti was released by Junoon in Pakistan.

== Births ==
- 10 August - Azam Khan, cricketer.
- 4 October - Shadab Khan, cricketer.
