= 1999 in Pakistan =

- Decades: 1970s; 1980s; 1990s; 2000s; 2010s
- See also: History of Pakistan; List of years in Pakistan; Timeline of Pakistani history

Events from the year 1999 in Pakistan.

== Incumbents ==
=== Federal government ===
- President: Muhammad Rafiq Tarar
- Prime Minister: Nawaz Sharif (until 12 October)
- Chief Executive: Pervez Musharraf (starting 12 October)
- Chief Justice: Ajmal Mian (until 30 June), Saeeduzzaman Siddiqui

=== Governors ===
- Governor of Balochistan –
  - until 17 August: Miangul Aurangzeb
  - 17 August – 25 October: Sayed Muhammad Fazal Agha
  - starting 25 October: Amir-ul-Mulk Mengal
- Governor of Khyber Pakhtunkhwa –
  - until 17 August: Arif Bangash
  - 17 August – 21 October: Miangul Aurangzeb
  - starting 21 October: Mohammad Shafiq
- Governor of Punjab –
  - until 18 August: Shahid Hamid
  - 18 August – 25 October: Zulfiqar Ali Khosa
  - starting 25 October: Muhammad Safdar
- Governor of Sindh –
  - until 17 June: Moinuddin Haider
  - 19 June – 25 October: Mamnoon Hussain
  - starting 25 October: Azim Daudpota

== Events ==
- Pakistan tests its Ghauri II missile.

=== May ===
- 20 May – massive hurricane strikes Sindh.
- 3 May – 26 July The Kargil conflict between Pakistan and India begins.
- 31 May – Bangladesh defeats the Pakistan Cricket Team during the 1999 Cricket World Cup.

=== June ===
- 20 June – The Pakistan cricket team lose the 1999 World cup final to Australia at Lord's.

=== October ===
- 12 October – Nawaz Sharif is deposed in a coup d'état by general Pervez Musharraf.

=== November ===
- 23 November – Pakistan is suspended from the commonwealth, after emergency rule is applied following the coup.

== Deaths ==
- 11 August – Mirza Ibrahim, Pakistani politician (b. 1905)
