= 2013 in Pakistan =

- Decades: 1990s; 2000s; 2010s; 2020s
- See also: History of Pakistan; List of years in Pakistan; Timeline of Pakistani history

Events in the year 2013 in Pakistan.

== Incumbents ==
=== Federal government ===
- President – Asif Ali Zardari
- President (September 9 – Present) – Mamnoon Hussain
- Prime Minister (June 22, 2012 – March 16, 2013 ) – Raja Pervaiz Ashraf
- Prime Minister (June 5 – Present) – Nawaz Sharif
- Prime Minister – Caretaker (March 25, 2013 – June 4, 2013) – Mir Hazar Khan Khoso
- President – Asif Ali Zardari
- Chief Justice – Iftikhar Muhammad Chaudhry (until December 11), Tassaduq Hussain Jillani

=== Chief ministers ===
Here is a list of chief ministers of provinces elected in General Elections 2013, Pakistan

- Chief Minister Punjab, Pakistan (June 8 – Present) – Muhammad Shahbaz Sharif
- Chief Minister Khyber Pakhtunkhwa (May 31 – Present) – Parvez Khattak
- Chief Minister Sind (May 30 – Present) – Qaim Ali Shah
- Chief Minister Balochistan (June 7 – Present) – Abdul Malik Baloch
- Chief Minister Punjab – Caretaker (March 27, 2013 – June 6, 2013) – Najam Sethi

=== Governors ===
- Governor of Balochistan – Nawab Zulfikar Ali Magsi (until 11 June); Muhammad Khan Achakzai (starting 11 June)
- Governor of Gilgit-Baltistan – Pir Karam Ali Shah
- Governor of Khyber Pakhtunkhwa – Syed Masood Kausar (until 10 February); Shaukatullah Khan (starting 10 February)
- Governor of Punjab – Syed Ahmed Mahmud (until 2 August); Mohammad Sarwar (starting 2 August)
- Governor of Sindh – Ishrat-ul-Ibad Khan

== Events ==
=== January ===
- January 10 – A series of terrorist attacks killed more than 100 people in Quetta.
- January 6 – Qazi Hussain Ahmed, a political leader and Ameer of Islamic political party Jamaat-e-Islami died in Islamabad.

=== March ===
- March 9 – A Christian, Sawan Masih, 28 is accused of blasphemy against the Islamic prophet Muhammad in a Christian neighborhood in Badami Bagh area.
- March 25 – Mir Hazar Khan Khoso is appointed as caretaker Prime Minister of Pakistan, following the completion of the PPP-led government's term in office. Khoso will oversee the general elections scheduled in May.

=== May ===
- May 11 – General Elections 2013 held across Pakistan.
- May 25 – A school bus explosion kills 17 children and injures seven more in Gujrat.

=== June ===
- June 5 – Nawaz Sharif is elected Prime Minister of Pakistan, following the Pakistan Muslim League (N)'s victory in the 2013 general election.
- June 26 – June 2013 Karachi bombing

=== July ===
- July 30 – Mamnoon Hussain is elected as the 12th President of Pakistan in 2013 Presidential election, he will be sworn in on September 9.

=== August ===
- August 6 – 2013 Pakistan–Afghanistan floods
- August 14 – People of Pakistan celebrated 67th independence day of their country on August 14.

=== September ===
- September 6 – Defence Day is celebrated in Pakistan.
- September 9 – Mamnoon Hussain is sworn in as the 12th President of Pakistan.
- September 24 – A 7.7 magnitude earthquake hits Baluchistan, at least 825 people are killed and hundreds injured.
- September 25 – International Conference of Muslim Leaders, under the supervision of Syed Munawar Hassan, Chief Of Jamaat-e-Islami Pakistan, held in Mansoora, Lahore.

=== October ===
In the end of October the prime minister went to Washington DC to have a meeting with US president Barack Obama.

=== November ===
November 9 celebrated as Iqbal day in Pakistan

- November 1 – Hakimullah Mehsud, leader of Tehrik-i-Taliban Pakistan (TTP) killed by a US drone attack.
- November 29 – Pakistan Chief of Army Staff, General Ashfaq Parvez Kayani retires. General Raheel Sharif becomes the next COAS.

=== December ===
- December 11 – Chief Justice Iftikhar Muhammad Chaudhry retired from his position, he remained in the Supreme Court from 2005 to 2013, Justice Tassaduq Hussain Jillani becomes the next Supreme Court Chief Justice.

== Sport ==
=== Cricket ===
Domestic

- 2012–13 Faysal Bank T20 Cup

International

- Pakistani cricket team in India in 2012–13
- Pakistani cricket team in South Africa in 2012–13

== Deaths ==
- January 2 – Maulvi Nazir, 37–38, Pakistani militant commander, drone strike.
- January 4 – Anwar Shamim, 81, Pakistani Air Force air marshal, Chief of Air Staff (1978–1985).
- January 6 – Qazi Hussain Ahmad, 74, Pakistani politician, Ameer of Jamaat-e-Islami (1987–2009), cardiac arrest.
- March 18 – Muhammad Mahmood Alam), 77, Pakistan Air Force Air Commodore (retd), Sitara-e-Jurat, died after a protracted illness.
- May 9 – Sanaullah Haq, 52?, criminal and terror suspect
- June 18 – Imran Khan Mohmand, politician who fell victim to the Mardan funeral bombing
- August 5 – Quraish Pur, 81, scholar, Urdu writer/novelist, columnist and media expert died after a protracted illness.

== See also ==
- 2013 in Pakistani television
- List of Pakistani films of 2013
