= Ibn-e-Qasim Bagh Stadium =

Stadium in Multan, Pakistan

- اسٹیڈیم باغ ابن قاسم
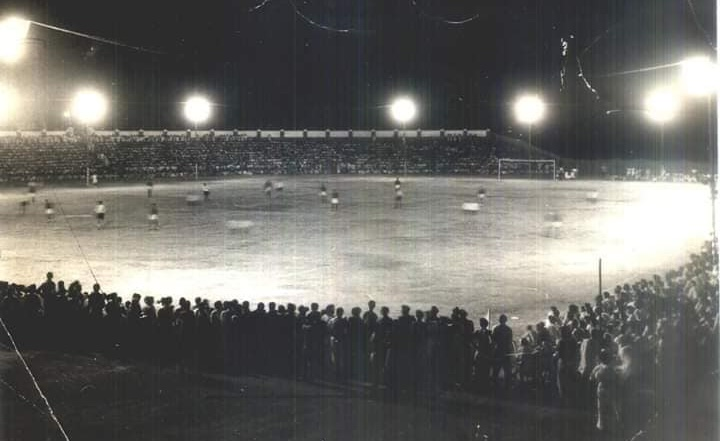
- Ismail Gold Shield Football Tournament at Ibn-e-Qasim Bagh Stadium in the 1950s
- Interactive map of Ibn-e-Qasim Bagh Stadium
- Full name: Qila Kohna Qasim Bagh Stadium
- Address: Pakistan
- Location: Multan, Pakistan
- Coordinates: 30°11′52″N 71°28′27″E
- Capacity: 18,000

Ibn-e-Qasim Bagh Stadium
- Old Fort Stadium
- Interactive map of Ibn-e-Qasim Bagh Stadium

Ground information

International information
- Only men's Test: 30 December 1980: Pakistan v West Indies
- First men's ODI: 17 December 1982: Pakistan v India
- Last men's ODI: 14 October 1994: Pakistan v Australia
- As of 9 October 2024; Source: ESPNcricinfo

The Ibn-e-Qasim Bagh Stadium, also known as Qila Kohna Qasim Bagh Stadium, is a multi-use stadium in Multan, Pakistan. It is currently used mostly for cricket and football. The stadium can accommodate 18,000 spectators.

== Etymology ==
The stadium is named in honor of Imād ad-Dīn Muḥammad ibn Qāsim ath-Thaqafī (Arabic: عماد الدين محمد بن القاسم الثقفي; c. 31 December 695 – 18 July 715), an Umayyad general who conquered the Sindh and Multan regions along the Indus River, in modern-day Pakistan, for the Umayyad Caliphate in the eighth century.

== History ==
The stadium was usually used to host various football tournaments in the mid 20th century. It regularly hosted the Ismail Gold Shield Football Tournament which featured teams from India, Iran, Ceylon, along with others. The matches were held under floodlights.

It hosted one cricket Test match in 1980.

It hosted the 2010 National Football Challenge Cup final match between KRL and Pakistan Navy.

Currently it is a regular venue for matches in the Pakistan Premier League.

On October 10, 2014, at least seven people died and 40 were injured as a result of a stampede at stadium after a rally by cricketer-turned-politician Imran Khan. Khan alleged that only two gates of the venue were opened at the end of the rally and the lights were also switched off. The local authorities denied the claim, stating that all five gates had been operational.

== List of international centuries ==
One Test century has been scored at the ground.

No.	Score	Player	Team	Balls	Inns.	Opposing team	Date	Result
1	120*	Vivian Richards	West Indies	263	1	Pakistan	30 December 1980	Drawn

Only three ODI centuries have been scored at the ground.

No.	Score	Player	Team	Balls	Inns.	Opposing team	Date	Result
1	118	Zaheer Abbas	Pakistan	86	1	India	17 December 1982	Won
2	117*	Mohsin Khan	Pakistan	118	1	India	17 December 1982	Won
3	101	Inzamam-ul-Haq	Pakistan	121	1	Sri Lanka	17 January 1992	Lost

== List of international five-wicket hauls ==
=== Tests ===
No.	Bowler	Date	Team	Opposing team	Inn	Overs	Runs	Wkts	Econ	Result
1	Imran Khan	30 December 1980	Pakistan	West Indies	1	22	62	5	2.81	Drawn

== See also ==
- List of Test cricket grounds
- List of football stadiums in Pakistan
- Multan Cricket Stadium
- List of stadiums in Pakistan
- List of cricket grounds in Pakistan
- One-Test wonder
