= 2012 in Pakistan =

- Decades: 1990s; 2000s; 2010s; 2020s
- See also: History of Pakistan; List of years in Pakistan; Timeline of Pakistani history

The following events occurred in Pakistan in the year 2012.

== Incumbents ==
=== Federal government ===
- President – Asif Ali Zardari
- Prime Minister – Yousaf Raza Gillani (until 19 June), Raja Pervaiz Ashraf (starting 22 June)
- Chief Justice – Abdul Hameed Dogar (until 21 March), Iftikhar Muhammad Chaudhry (starting 21 March)

=== Governors ===
- Governor of Balochistan – Nawab Zulfikar Ali Magsi
- Governor of Gilgit-Baltistan – Pir Karam Ali Shah
- Governor of Khyber Pakhtunkhwa – Syed Masood Kausar
- Governor of Punjab – Latif Khosa (until 22 December); Syed Ahmed Mahmud (starting 25 December)
- Governor of Sindh – Ishrat-ul-Ibad Khan

== Events ==
- Spring - The four women and two men were killed in Kohistan after a dance party in Kohistan. The incident became known as the 2012 Kohistan video case.

=== January ===
- 2 January: India-Pakistan exchange a list of their nuclear installations.
- The death toll of a fake medicine crisis at a cardiology hospital in Lahore reaches 112.

=== February ===
- Iranian consulate organised an exhibition of Iranian products at the Expo Centre Lahore in the third week of April,
- Iran assured Pakistan that it is sincerely working to provide assistance and support for overcoming the energy crisis.
- Sharmeen Obaid-Chinoy becomes the first Pakistani to ever win an Oscar. At the 84th Academy Awards, her documentary on the reconstructive surgery of acid attack victims, Saving Face wins for Best Documentary (Short Subject).

=== May ===
- Daniyal Ali Azfar, the youngest digital photographer in the world held his first exhibition at the age of 1 year, 363 days on 5 May 2012 in an art gallery in Karachi.
- A video was published involving two men and four girls went viral. This caused the murders of the people in question. The incident is known as the 2012 Kohistan scandal.

=== June ===
- Raja Pervaiz Ashraf is elected as Prime Minister of Pakistan, following the disqualification of Yousaf Raza Gillani over a contempt of court conviction by the Supreme Court of Pakistan.

=== July ===
- July 9 - A gunman attacked a military camp near Wazirabad in Punjab, killing seven security personnel. The attack came at a time when Pakistan reopened NATO supply lines to Afghanistan, which had previously been closed for eight months to protest the 2011 NATO attack in Pakistan.

=== August ===
- August 14 – The nation celebrated its 65th Independence Day

=== September ===
- 12 September - 2012 Pakistan floods
- Over 314 people die in factory fires in the Pakistani cities of Karachi and Lahore. (see 2012 Pakistan garment factory fires) (Reuters)

=== October ===
- October 9 – 15-year-old blogger Malala Yousafzai was shot in the head by the Pakistani Taliban.

=== November ===
- 6 November - US polls event organised in US embassy in Pakistan.
- 9 November - Iqbal day celebrated with full zeal across the nation.

=== December ===
- On 22 December, Bashir Ahmad Bilour was leaving after attending a meeting of ANP workers at a private residence in Peshawar, when he was attacked and critically injured by a suicide bomber at 6:15 PM. He was rushed to Lady Reading Hospital where he died at 7:40 PM. His secretary Noor Muhammad was also killed in the blast. The funeral prayer for him was held at Colonel Sher Khan Army Stadium on 23 December 2012, and he was laid to rest at Syed Hasan Pir graveyard in Peshawar

== Sport ==
=== Cricket ===
Domestic

- Faysal Bank Super 8 T20 Cup 2012
- Faysal Bank Twenty-20 Cup 2012–13

International

- Pakistani cricket team vs England in the UAE in 2011–12
- Afghan cricket team v Pakistan in the UAE in 2011–12

=== Other ===
- Pakistan at the 2012 Summer Olympics

== Deaths ==
- 10 January
  - Azeem Daultana, 32, politician and MNA, road accident.
  - Pir Pagara, 83, politician and spiritual leader, heart attack.
- 14 January – Arfa Karim, 16, Pakistani student, world's youngest Microsoft Certified Professional (2004–2008), idiopathic epilepsy seizures. (born 1995)
- 7 April – Bashir Ahmed Qureshi, 52, Sindhi nationalist politician, heart attack.
- 13 June – Mehdi Hassan, 84, Pakistani ghazal singer.
- 17 June – Fauzia Wahab, 56, Pakistani politician, complications of gall bladder surgery.
- 18 June – Ghazala Javed, Pakistani singer, shooting.
- 22 June – Obaidullah Baig, 75, journalist and author
- 22 December – Bashir Ahmad Bilour, member of the provincial assembly of Khyber-Pakhtunkhwa and Senior Minister for Local Government and Rural Development of Khyber-Pakhtunkhwa.

== See also ==
- 2012 Pakistan federal budget
- 2012 in Pakistani television
- List of Pakistani films of 2012
