= 2016 in Pakistan =

- Decades: 1990s; 2000s; 2010s; 2020s
- See also: History of Pakistan; List of years in Pakistan; Timeline of Pakistani history

The following lists events that happened during 2016 in Pakistan.

== Incumbents ==
=== Federal government ===
- Nawaz Sharif, Prime Minister, 5 June 2013 – 28 July 2017
- Mamnoon Hussain, President, 9 September 2013 – 9 September 2018
- Anwar Zaheer Jamali, Chief Justice, 10 September 2015 – 30 December 2016
- Saqib Nisar, Chief Justice, starting 31 December 2016

=== Governors ===
- Governor of Balochistan – Muhammad Khan Achakzai
- Governor of Gilgit-Baltistan – Mir Ghazanfar Ali Khan
- Governor of Khyber Pakhtunkhwa – Mehtab Ahmed Khan Abbasi (until 25 February); Iqbal Zafar Jhagra (starting 25 February)
- Governor of Punjab – Malik Muhammad Rafique Rajwana
- Governor of Sindh – Ishrat-ul-Ibad Khan (until 9 November); Saeeduzzaman Siddiqui (starting 11 November)

== Events ==
=== January ===
- The Pakistan and India governments provided one another with a full list of nuclear sites, military and civilian, in accordance with the 1988 Non-Nuclear Aggression Agreement
- A suicide bomb attacker killed 14 people and injured 20 more near a polio centre near the Pakistani city of Quetta on 13 January.
- Brahumdagh Bugti's asylum application was rejected in Switzerland on 17 January. He had been in Switzerland since he fled Afghanistan in 2010, surviving Al Qaeda, and allegedly Pakistani government, attempts on his life.
- Pervez Musharraf was acquitted on 18 January in the murder trial of Akbar Bugti, the Baloch tribal leader who died in a military operation in 2006.
- Gunmen attacked a university in Charsadda, Pakistan. At least 21 people were reportedly killed.

=== March ===
- 16 March – A bus bomb in Peshawar kills 15 people. and Pakistan played their first match of ICC WORLD T20 2016 against Bangladesh (Pakistan beat Bangladesh)
- 25 MARCH-Pakistan Cricket Star SHAHID KHAN AFRIDI Played His last INTERNATIONAL Match(T20) for Pakistan against AUSTRALIA (AUSTRALIA Won match by 21 Runs)
- 27 March – 72 people were killed in a suicide bombing in Lahore.

=== April ===
- 20 April
  - Seven policemen guarding polio team killed on duty.
  - IED blast in Mohamand agency killing two.
- In Punjab, at least 33 people died after eating sweets, accidentally tainted with insecticide. The mass poisoning occurred in April.

=== June ===
- Musician Amjad Sabri is killed in a targeted shooting.

=== October ===
- 2016 Pakistan Floods

=== November ===
- 1 November – At least 14 people are killed and 59 burned when a gas cylinder explosion aboard an oil tanker causes a major fire at the ship breaking yard in Gadani in Pakistan's Balochistan Province. Dozens other workers remain missing as many injured are transferred to hospitals in nearby Karachi.
- 3 November – At least 22 people have been killed and 65 injured following a collision of the Bahauddin Zakaria Express with a stationary train at Juma Goth Train station, Karachi, Pakistan.

=== December ===
- 7 December – PIA plane PK-661 crashed during flight killing 47 people including Junaid Jumshed and his wife.

== See also ==
- Timeline of Pakistani history
