= List of Pakistani films of 1991 =

List of Pakistani films by year 1991

A list films produced in Pakistan in 1991 (see 1991 in film) and in the Urdu language:

== 1991 ==
Title	Director	Cast	Notes
Aalmi Jasoos		Kaveeta, Qazi, Gullu	Also released in Punjabi language. (Double version film)
Aandhi		Shabana, Nadeem, Faisal	
Aansoo		Naz, Amir Farid, Reza	Also released in Punjabi language. (Double version film)
Akhri Shikar		Babra, Salma Agha, Qazi	Also released in Punjabi language. (Double version film)
Aslah		Madiha, Suleman, Tariq	Also released in Punjabi language. (Double version film)
Badmuash Thugg		Gori, Sultan Rahi, Javed	Also released in Punjabi language. (Double version film)
Bakhtawar	Iqbal Kashmiri	Neeli, Izhar Qazi, Saima, Javed Sheikh	Also released in Punjabi language. (Double version film) The film was released on November 1, 1991
Betab		Kaveeta, Asad, Shahida	Also released in Punjabi language. (Double version film)
Chitaan		Musarrat, Nasir Bholu	Also released in Punjabi language. (Double version film)
Cobra		Nadira, Sultan Rahi, Gullu	Also released in Punjabi language. (Double version film)
Darindgi		Neeli, Javed, Reema	Also released in Punjabi language. (Double version film)
Dil		Reema, Shaan, Rustam	Also released in Punjabi language. (Double version film)
Doulat Ke Pujari		Nadira, Nadeem, Neeli	Also released in Punjabi language. (Double version film)
Goli Tere Naam Ki		Sassi, Amir Farid, Ruhi	Also released in Punjabi language. (Double version film)
Grango		Musarrat, Badar Munir	
Gulfam		Madiha, Shaan, Rahi	Also released in Punjabi language. (Double version film)
Hussan Ka Chor	Altaf Hussain	Shaan Shahid, Javed Sheikh, Nadira	Also released in Punjabi language. (Double version film)
Ishq		Reema, Shaan, Rustam	Also released in Punjabi language. (Double version film)
Ishq Deewana	Nasir Hussain	Madiha Shah, Shaan	Also released in Punjabi language. (Double version film) The film was released on September 13, 1991
Kalay Chor			
Khatron Ke Khilari		Neeli, Javed, Reema	
Mard	Altaf Hussain	Madiha Shah, Shaan, Khushbu	Also released in Punjabi language. (Double version film) The film was released on January 18, 1991
Medan-e-Jang		Reema, Sultan Rahi, Madiha	Also released in Punjabi language. (Double version film)
Naag Devta		Reema, Shaan, Qureshi	Also released in Punjabi language. (Double version film)
Nadira	Altaf Hussain	Nadira, Shaan, Saima, Naghma	Also released in Punjabi language. (Double version film) The film was released on August 2, 1991
Nigahen	Hasnain	Afzaal Ahmad, Shahida Mini, Shaan Shahid, Madhiha Shah	Also released in Punjabi language. (Double version film) The film was released on August 2, 1991
Pyar Aur Paisa		Neeli, Ismael Shah	
Pyar Hi Pyar		Reema, Shaan, Nida	Also released in Punjabi language. (Double version film)
Pyar Kiya To Darna Kya	Aslam Daar	Durdana Rehman, Shaan, Babur	Also released in Punjabi language. (Double version film) The film was released on September 21, 1991
Rambo		Reema, Ajab Gul, Hamayun	Also released in Punjabi language. (Double version film)
Rangeelay Chor		Madiha, Ajab Gul	Also released in Punjabi language. (Double version film)
Riaz Gujjar			
Saat Khoon Muaf		Neeli, Javed, Reema	Also released in Punjabi language. (Double version film)
Sailab		Reema, Shaan, Asad	Also released in Punjabi language. (Double version film)
Son of Shehnshah		Shehnaz, Badar Munir	
Teen Yakke Teen Chhakke		Neeli, Sultan Rahi, Qazi	Also released in Punjabi language. (Double version film)
Watan Ke Rakhwaley		Nadira, Nadeem, Rahi	
Zid	Javed Fazil	Ghulam Mohiuddin, Nadeem, Babra Sharif	Based on 1990 American film Revenge

== See also ==
- 1991 in Pakistan
