= 2017 in Pakistan =

- Decades: 1990s; 2000s; 2010s; 2020s
- See also: History of Pakistan; List of years in Pakistan; Timeline of Pakistani history

The following lists notable events that happened during 2017 in Pakistan.

== Incumbents ==
=== Federal government ===
- Nawaz Sharif, Prime Minister, 5 June 2013-28 July 2017
- Shahid Khaqan Abbasi, Prime Minister, 1 August 2017 - incumbent
- Mamnoon Hussain, President, 9 September 2013-9 September 2018
- Saqib Nisar, Chief Justice, 31 December 2016-present

=== Governors ===
- Governor of Balochistan – Muhammad Khan Achakzai
- Governor of Gilgit-Baltistan – Mir Ghazanfar Ali Khan
- Governor of Khyber Pakhtunkhwa – Iqbal Zafar Jhagra
- Governor of Punjab – Rafique Rajwana
- Governor of Sindh – Saeeduzzaman Siddiqui (until 8 February); Mohammad Zubair (starting 8 February)

== Events ==
=== January ===
- January 21 - A bombing at a vegetable market in Parachinar, Pakistan led to the death of 25 people.

=== February ===
- February 9 – The second season of the Pakistan Super League began.
- February 16 – A suicide bombing at the Shrine of Lal Shahbaz Qalander in Sehwan, Pakistan resulted in the deaths of over 90 people.
- February 19 - Pakistan at the 2017 Asian Winter Games

=== March ===
- March 5 – The second season of the Pakistan Super League ended.
- March 14 – Pakistan's sixth census began.

=== April ===
- April 19 – 16th Lux Style Awards's ceremony was held in Karachi and was hosted by Atif Aslam.

=== June ===
- June 1 - 18 – Pakistan won the 2017 ICC Champions Trophy 2017, defeating India in the final.
- June 23 - A series of bombings in Quetta and Parachinar led to the death of over 90 people.

=== July ===
- July 28 – A unanimous verdict by the Supreme Court of Pakistan disqualified Prime Minister Nawaz Sharif from office, over the controversy of him and some of his family members names being in the Panama Papers, which led to his resignation.

=== August ===
- August 1 - Shahid Khaqan Abbasi sworn in as prime minister, succeeding Nawaz Sharif.
- August 31 - The investigation into the assassination of former prime minister Benazir Bhutto completed.

=== November ===
- November 5 - 27 Tehreek-e-Labaik, an Islamist party led by Khadim Hussain Rizvi, staged protests in the federal capital Islamabad over minor changes in the oath required for parliamentarians over belief in the finality of the prophethood of Muhammad, and demanded the resignation of the Federal Minister of Law and Justice Zahid Hamid whom they held responsible for it. Hamid eventually resigned on November 27.
- November 24 - a suicide bomber struck the vehicle of AIG Ashraf Noor in Hayatabad, Peshawar.

=== December ===
- December 17 - An attack by two suicide bombers on a church in the city of Quetta left nine people dead and fifty-seven injured.

== See also ==
- Timeline of Pakistani history
