= List of Pakistani films of 1998 =

List of Pakistani films by year 1998

A list films produced in Pakistan in 1998 (see 1998 in film) and in the Urdu language:

== 1998 ==
Title	Director	Cast	Genre	Notes
Choorian		Moammar Rana, Saima Noor, Nargis (Actress), Sana Nawaz, Shafqat Cheema		
Deevaren		Reema, Babur, Saima		
Dil Sanbhala Na Jaye		Reema, Babur, Saima		
Do Boond Pani		Resham, Shaan, Saud		
Doli Saja Ke Rakhna		Reema, Shaan, Rambo		
Dulha Le Kar Jaun Gi		Reema, Babur, Gullu		The film was released on September 25, 1998
Duniya Dekhe Gi		Resham, Shaan, Moamar Rana		The film was released on June 19, 1998
Dupatta Jal Raha Hai	Syed Noor	Saima, Arbaz Khan, Resham, Nadeem	Drama	
Ehsas		Meera, Shaan, Javed		
Harjai		Meera, Babur, Neeli		The film was released on July 10, 1998
Haseena Numbri Aashiq Das Numbri		Meera, Shaan, Saud		
Insaf Ho To Aisa		Reema, Shaan, Babur		
Jinnah - The Movie	Jamil Dehlavi	Christopher Lee, James Fox, Maria Aitken, Shashi Kapoor, Richard Lintern	Biography; Drama	The story of Jinnah, the founder of Pakistan.
Jise De Moula		Reema, Babur, Saud		
Kabhi Haan Kabhi Naa		Meera, Shaan, Saud		
Kahin Pyar Na Ho Jaye		Resham, Shaan, Salim		
Khalnayak		Neeli, Javed, Rambo		
Khatarnak Haseena		Sabeeta, Sheeva, Noutan		
King Maker		Reema, Shaan, Saud		
Mohafiz	Syed Noor	Saima, Shahid, Nadeem	Drama	
Mohlat		Resham, Moamar, Nadeem		
Nakhra Gori Ka		Reema, Babur, Jia Ali		
Nikah	Sangeeta	Reema Khan, Shaan Shahid, Ahsan Khan, Nirma, Laila, Deeba, Abid Khan, Mishi Khan	Drama	A remake of 1970's film Aina. The film was released on June 5, 1998.
Sahib, Bibi Aur Tawaif		Chandni, Javed, Rambo		
Sahib Jee		Reema, Nadeem, Javed		Also released in Punjabi language. (double version film)
Too Chor Main Sipahi		Sana, Rambo, Mohsin		
Too Meri Main Tera		Reema, Shaan, Rambo		
Very Good Duniya Very Bad Log	S. Suleman	Reshan, Shaan, Fakhar Alam, Nargis, Neeli, Kavi, Latif Kapadia, Zaheen Tahira		Pop singer Fakhar-e-Alam's debut film.
Zevar		Reema, Babur, Shahid		
Ziddi		Samia, Saud, Babur		
Zor		Shahid, Nadeem, Reema, Babur, Moamar		

== See also ==
- 1998 in Pakistan
