= 2000 in Pakistan =

- Decades: 1980s; 1990s; 2000s; 2010s; 2020s
- See also: History of Pakistan; List of years in Pakistan; Timeline of Pakistani history

The following lists events that happened during 2000 in Pakistan.

== Incumbents ==
=== Federal government ===
- President: Muhammad Rafiq Tarar
- Chief Justice: Saeeduzzaman Siddiqui (until 26 January), Irshad Hasan Khan

=== Governors ===
- Governor of Balochistan – Amir-ul-Mulk Mengal
- Governor of Khyber Pakhtunkhwa – Mohammad Shafiq (until 15 August); Iftikhar Hussain Shah (starting 15 August)
- Governor of Punjab – Muhammad Safdar
- Governor of Sindh – Azim Daudpota (until 24 May); Muhammad Mian Soomro (starting 25 May)

== Events ==
=== April ===
- After military takeover, Former Prime Minister Nawaz Sharif is sentenced to life imprisonment.

=== October ===
- 13 October – Pakistan's supreme court rules that the 1999 coup d'état was justified.

=== December ===
- Nawaz Sharif goes into exile to Saudi Arabia.

== Deaths ==
- 13 August – Nazia Hassan, pop-singer, cancer
- 23 December – Madam Noor Jahan, playback singer
