= 2015 Pakistan Day Parade =

Military parade in Islamabad, Pakistan

Pakistan Day Parade 2015 was a military parade held on 23 March 2015 in Islamabad, Pakistan to commemorate 75 years since the Lahore Resolution of 1940. The parade was held after gap of 7 years because of growing wave of terrorism, however the decision to hold the parade was held after the launch of a mass anti-terrorism operation by the Pakistan Army. It was widely seen as a rather successful attempt to boost the self-confidence to general public.

== Overview ==
The three-hour parade featured all three service branches, the Army, Navy, and Air Force – including the army's strategic command force, which administers land-based nuclear weapons arsenal. The parade featured nuclear-capable and conventional missiles, indigenously manufactured tanks, and a squadron of JF-17 Thunder fighter jets along with Pakistan's first locally manufactured armed unmanned aerial vehicle. It was overseen by President of Pakistan Mamnoon Hussain and Prime Minister of Pakistan Nawaz Sharif.

The parade was welcomed by national media outlets. Dawn called the parade as a 'highly anticipated' event, while Pakistan Today called the event as crucial to refreshing nation's patriotism. Indian news outlet NDTV joined Reuters in calling the parade as sending a message to neighboring India. The Guardian called the revival of the military parade after a seven-year marking a further step in the rehabilitation of the army after a dismal period.
