= 2015–16 Pakistan federal budget =

2015–16 Federal Budget
- Submitted by: Ishaq Dar
- Submitted to: National Assembly
- Presented: June 5, 2015
- Country: Pakistan
- Parliament: Pakistan
- Party: PML(N)
- Treasurer: Ministry of Finance
- Website: 2015–16 Budget

The Federal budget 2015–16 is the federal budget of Pakistan for the fiscal year beginning from 1 July 2015 and ending on 30 June 2016. The budget was presented in the Parliament by the Minister of Finance, Ishaq Dar on June 5, 2015.
