= Manzoor Ahmed =

Pakistani footballer (born 1992)

Personal information
- Date of birth: 1 February 1992 (age 34)
- Place of birth: Quetta, Pakistan
- Position: Defender

Senior career*
Years	Team	Apps	(Gls)
2011–2014	WAPDA		
2014–2016	Afghan Chaman		

International career
- Pakistan U19
2011	Pakistan U21	2	(0)
2012	Pakistan U22		
2011	Pakistan	5	(0)
- * Club domestic league appearances and goals

Manzoor Ahmed (born 2 January 1992) is a Pakistani former international footballer who played as a defender. He is the secretary of sports in the Pakistani province of Balochistan.

== International career ==
Ahmed earned his first international cap at the 2012 AFC Challenge Cup qualifications against Turkmenistan on 21 March 2011.

== Career statistics ==
=== International ===
Appearances and goals by national team and year
National team	Year	Apps	Goals
Pakistan	2011	5	0
Total		5	0
