= Raja Saroop Khan =

Pakistan Army general

Lieutenant General Raja Saroop Khan
- Born: Mirpur, Azad Kashmir, Pakistan
- Died: 22 October 2020; Rawalpindi, Punjab, Pakistan
- Other name: Raja Sarup Khan
- Alma mater: Pakistan Military Academy
- Military career
- Allegiance: Pakistan
- Branch: Pakistan Army
- Service years: 1953–1998
- Rank: Lieutenant General
- Commands: II Corps
- Other work: Governor of Punjab

Raja Saroop Khan (Urdu: راجہ سروپ خان) was a career Pakistan Army General from Kashmir, out of Punjab.who served as the Governor of Punjab from 1995 to 1996.

== Career ==
Raja Saroop Khan was commissioned in the 7th PMA Long Course from Pakistan Military Academy in 1953. Later in his military career, he stayed as the Vice-Chief of General Staff (VCGS) at the GHQ, commanded an armoured division, and later served in the GHQ as Military Secretary (MS). He was promoted to lieutenant general in March 1984 and given the command of II Corps at Multan. After retiring from the army in March 1988, he started his political career.

== Death ==
Raja Saroop Khan died in Rawalpindi on 22 October 2020 due to natural causes.

Political offices
Preceded by Chaudhry Altaf Hussain	Governor of Punjab; 1995 – 1996	Succeeded by Khawaja Tariq Rahim
