= Rehman Khalid =

Pakistani baseball player (born 1993)

Rehman Khalid (born 4 October 1993) is a Pakistani baseball pitcher. He played for the national team in the 2017 WBC Qualifiers.
