= Abdul Rahim Nagori =

Pakistani painter (1939–2011)

- Born: 1939
- Died: 14 January 2011 (aged 71–72); Karachi
- Education: 1961–65: B.A. (Hon), Fine Arts (Painting), M.A. Fine Arts (Painting), University of the Punjab, Lahore
- Spouse: Mehfooza Diwan Nagori
- Awards: President's Pride of Performance Award

Prof. Abdul Rahim Nagori (1939 – 14 January 2011) was a Pakistani painter known for his socio-political themes. He has held one-man exhibitions since 1958. He taught at the University of Sindh in Jamshoro, Pakistan where he founded and headed the Department of Fine Arts.

He was honoured with President's Pride of Performance Award announced on 14 August 2010. He was married to Mehfooza Diwan Nagori.

== Exhibitions ==
- 1982: Anti-militarism and violence exhibition which got censored and banned by the martial law regime.
- 1983: Anti-martial law exhibition, sponsored by Pakistan Federal Union of Journalists (PFUJ).
- 1986: Anti-dictatorship exhibition held at Indus Gallery, Karachi. Most powerful exhibition of his career where he exposed 62 different awful national events which shook the conscience of the nation.
- 1988: Anti-dictatorship Exhibition, "Road to Democracy", held at Indus Gallery, Karachi, Pakistan. Reviewed by Mark Fineman of the Los Angeles Times. Painted the evils of society by evolving new alphabet symbols for children, basing them on the events which took place in preceding two years. Bomb blasts, crime, dacoities, guns, heroin, Ojhri, Kalashnikov, rape etc. became new symbols of the alphabet.
- 1990: "I am you" Anti-violence exhibition, large hoarding for display on road side, sponsored by Deutsche Bank, participated by International Artists.
- 1990: "Women of Myth and Reality" exhibition at Indus Gallery, Karachi. Repudiated the treatment meted out to the women.
- 1992: Exhibition on minority, held at Chawkhandi Art Gallery, Karachi. A series of 40 paintings was again a process of social and political protest for the mute, bewildered and confused society which finds itself full of tears, shame, anguish and anger.
- 1994: Exhibition "Black amongst Blacks" held at Lahore Art Gallery, Lahore.
- 2004: Exhibition "Return to Sphinx" held at V.M. Art Gallery, Karachi.

== Education ==
- 1961–65: B.A. (Hon), Fine Arts (Painting), M.A. Fine Arts (Painting), University of the Punjab, Lahore, Pakistan.

== Served as ==
- 1965–66: Lecturer, Dept of Fine Arts, University of the Punjab, Lahore.
- 1966–67: Head of Fine Arts, Cadet College Kohat, Kohat.
- 1966–70: Education Officer, Pakistan Air Force.
- 1970: Founder Head Dept. of Fine Art at University of Sindh, Jamshoro.
- 1985–1995: Professor, Fine Arts, University of Sindh, Jamshoro.
- 1983–86: Member BOG, National College of Arts, Lahore.
- 1984–85: Member NAHE, University Grants Commission, Islamabad.
- 1984: Chairman, Curriculum Committee, Art Teachers Training Programme, Ministry of Education, Islamabad.
- 1997–98: Advisor, Federal College of Art and Design, Jamshoro.
- 1996–1997: Director, Pakistan National Council of the Arts, Ministry of Culture.
- 1998–: Member BOG, Shaukat Suriya College of Liberal Arts, Hamdard University, Karachi.
- 1998:Member BOG, Pakistan National Council of the Arts, Ministry of Culture.

== Awards ==
- 2011: Pride of Performance
