= Pakistani cricket team in New Zealand in 2014–15 =

Pakistan cricket team in New Zealand in 2014–15
	New Zealand	Pakistan
- Dates: 31 January 2015 – 3 February 2015
Captains	Brendon McCullum	Misbah-ul-Haq

One Day International series
- Results: New Zealand won the 2-match series 2–0
Most runs	Ross Taylor (161)	Misbah-ul-Haq (103)
Most wickets	Grant Elliott (5)	Mohammad Irfan (3)
- Player of the series: Grant Elliott (NZ)

The Pakistan cricket team toured New Zealand from 31 January to 3 February 2015. The tour consisted of two 50-over Tour Matches and two One Day International matches which formed part of Pakistan's preparation for the 2015 Cricket World Cup to be held in Australia and New Zealand. New Zealand won the series 2–0.

== Squads ==
ODIs
New Zealand	Pakistan
Brendon McCullum (c) (wk); Corey Anderson; Trent Boult; Grant Elliott; Martin Guptill; Tom Latham (wk); Mitchell McClenaghan; Nathan McCullum; Kyle Mills; Adam Milne; Luke Ronchi (wk); Tim Southee; Ross Taylor; Daniel Vettori; Kane Williamson (vc)	Misbah-ul-Haq (c); Ehsan Adil; Shahid Afridi (vc); Sarfraz Ahmed (wk); Umar Akmal (wk); Mohammad Hafeez; Mohammad Irfan; Bilawal Bhatti; Sohail Khan; Younis Khan; Sohaib Maqsood; Wahab Riaz; Yasir Shah; Ahmed Shehzad; Haris Sohail

== Tour Matches ==
=== 50-over Tour Match ===
25 January 2015
Scorecard

Pakistanis; 313 (49.3 overs)	v	New Zealand Board Presidents XI; 317/4 (49.2 overs)
Misbah-ul-Haq 107 (119); Logan van Beek 2/53 (10 overs)		Tim Seifert 115* (89); Ehsan Adil 2/81 (9.2 overs)

New Zealand Board President's XI won by 6 wickets
Bert Sutcliffe Oval, Lincoln
Umpires: Gary Baxter and Tony Gillies
Player of the match: Tim Seifert (NZ Presidents XI)

- Pakistan won the toss and elected to bat

=== 2nd 50-over Tour Match ===
27 January 2015
Scorecard

Pakistanis; 267/7 (50 overs)	v	New Zealand Board Presidents XI; 269/9 (49.5 overs)
Misbah-ul-Haq 88* (89); Kyle Jamieson 2/49 (9 overs)		Michael Pollard 153 (132); Mohammad Irfan 3/39 (10 overs)

New Zealand Board President's XI won by 1 wicket
Bert Sutcliffe Oval, Lincoln
Umpires: Gary Baxter and Phil Jones
Player of the match: Michael Pollard (NZ Presidents XI)

- Pakistan won the toss and elected to bat

== ODI series ==
=== 1st ODI ===
31 January 2015
14:00 (D/N)
Scorecard

Pakistan; 210 (45.3 overs)	v	New Zealand; 213/3 (39.3 overs)
Shahid Afridi 67 (29); Grant Elliott 3/26 (4.3 overs)		Grant Elliott 64* (68); Shahid Afridi 1/39 (10 overs)

New Zealand won by 7 wickets
Westpac Stadium, Wellington
Umpires: Chris Gaffaney (NZ) and Michael Gough (Eng)
Player of the match: Grant Elliott (NZ)

- New Zealand won the toss and elected to field.
- This was Kyle Mills' (NZ) last international match, the latter announced retirement after the world cup, in which he did not play a single match.

=== 2nd ODI ===
3 February 2015
14:00 (D/N)
Scorecard

New Zealand; 369/5 (50 overs)	v	Pakistan; 250 (43.1 overs)
Kane Williamson 112 (88); Mohammed Irfan 2/52 (10 overs)		Mohammad Hafeez 86 (89); Nathan McCullum 2/33 (5 overs)

New Zealand won by 119 runs
McLean Park, Napier
Umpires: Rod Tucker (Aus) and Derek Walker (NZ)
Player of the match: Kane Williamson (NZ)

- New Zealand won the toss and elected to bat.
