= Saadat Khiyali =

Pakistani journalist

- Born: Saadat Khiyali
- Died: 2 March 2011
- Occupations: Journalist, Columnist
- Title: Executive Editor Daily Mashriq Lahore.

Saadat Khiyali was a senior Pakistani journalist, columnist, and committed trade union leader. He was Executive Editor of Daily Mashriq Lahore. He was also known for his columns in Urdu newspapers. He worked under Shaukat Butt who was Vice President of the Union of Journalists Rawalpindi from 1970–74.

== Career ==
Khiyali broke the news of SIX Points of Mujib ur Rheman in Kohistan. Ghulam Akbar, Chief Editor of Al Akhbar, was then the Executive Editor of Kohistan. Enayat Ullah recruited Sadat Khayali in Kohistan for his reporting.

== Death ==
Saadat Khiyali died on 2 March 2011.
