= Gul Ahmad Saeed =

Pakistani suspected mass murderer

- Born: 1990 (age 35–36); Pakistan

Details
- Date: November 28, 2014; April 5, 2015
- Locations: Charsadda, Khyber Pakhtunkhwa, Pakistan
- Targets: Family members, fiancé
- Killed: 14
- Injured: 0
- Weapon: Kalashnikov rifle

Gul Ahmad Saeed (born 1990) is a suspected Pakistani mass murderer who killed 14 people. On November 28, 2014, Saeed is believed to have murdered his parents, brother, and sister-in-law when they obstructed his marriage. After the murders, he went on the run. On April 5, 2015, Saeed, along with some accomplices, murdered his fiancé and nine of her relatives. All of them were shot by a Kalashnikov rifle.
