= 2014 Multan stampede =

Crowd crush in Multan, Pakistan

Multan stampede
- Date: 10 October 2014
- Location: Multan, Pakistan
- Type: Stampede
- Cause: Overcrowding and mismanagement
- Deaths: 8
- Injuries: 40
- Inquiries: Three-member committee headed by Secretary Environment Iqbal Muhammad

On October 10, 2014, a stampede occurred in Multan, Pakistan at a public rally for political party, Pakistan Tehreek-e-Insaf (PTI). It caused the deaths of more than half a dozen people.

== Cause ==
No definitive cause for the incident has been identified.

As Imran Khan ended his speech, a large number of people rushed together towards the main gate to leave the venue. Khan accused the administration of deliberately sabotaging the rally. He said that a large number of people were deliberately sent on to the stage, electricity was disconnected and only two gates were allowed to open, which led to the incident. He said, "I condemn the role deputy commissioner Multan played. Out of six main gates, only two were opened after the rally.”

Eight people were killed and 40 others suffered injuries in the stampede.

== Response ==
After the tragedy, the Chief Minister of Punjab, Shahbaz Sharif, ordered the provincial government of Punjab to investigate. A three-member committee headed by Secretary Environment Iqbal Muhammad was formed to investigate the incident. However, PTI rejected the probe. PTI Vice Chairman Shah Mehmood Qureshi blamed DCO Multan Zahid Saleem Gondal for the stampede at the party’s rally in the city. He said that Gondal was hiding facts by giving wrong statements. Qureshi added that the administration put PTI chairperson Imran Khan’s life in danger. Khan, Chairman of the PTI, also denounced the forming of the committee, saying “I have no confidence in Prime Minister Nawaz Sharif and Punjab Chief Minister Shahbaz Sharif”.

When the committee headed by Punjab Secretary Environment Iqbal Chauhan submitted its report, it held PTI management partly responsible for the incident, saying that organisers did not follow the rules of the agreement signed between party and the local administration. In contrast to PTI allegations, the report termed the tragedy an accident and dismissed accusations that the stampede was a conspiracy by the district administration. “All five gates, especially the gate where the stampede took place, were open at the time when people were exiting the venue and there was adequate arrangement of lighting at the time of the incident,” the report said. The inquiry committee stated that it was an accident and there was no element of subversion. The gates of the venue were open and there were proper lighting arrangements. The spray of water by Rescue-1122 proved very useful and a number of human lives were saved while the crowd was dispersed.

On 18 October 2014, eight days after the incident, a petition seeking registration of a case against senior leaders of PTI was filed in a session court in Multan by Advocate Malik Khalil. The petition sought responsibility from the PTI Chairman Khan, Vice Chairman Shah Mehmood Qureshi, Secretary General Jahangir Tarin, PTI Punjab president Ejaz Chaudhry, the party's southern Punjab president Noor Khan Bhaba, district president Ejaz Janjua and Awami Muslim League chief Sheikh Rasheed Ahmed along with the event organisers for the tragedy. Advocate Malik Khalil asked the court to order registration of a case against the accused, saying that at least seven PTI supporters were killed in the stampede on October 10.
