= Sajjad Ali Shah =

Pakistani judge (born 1957)

Sajjad Ali Shah (born 14 August 1957) is a Pakistani jurist who serving as a judge of the Supreme Court of Pakistan from 15 March 2017 until reaching the retirement age on August 14, 2022. Previously, he served as the Chief Justice of the Sindh High Court.

== Early life and education ==
Sajjad Ali Shah was born on 14 August 1957. He received his early education from the Government Islamia College, Karachi. Later, he earned his Bachelor of Laws degree in 1984 and Master of Laws in 1988 from Sindh Muslim Law College.

== Career ==
Shah began his legal career in 1985. He also served as an honorary lecturer at S.M. Law College, Karachi, from 1995 until his judicial appointment.

In 2002, Shah was appointed as Standing Counsel for the Government of Pakistan, and in 2004, he became Deputy Attorney General of Pakistan. He was elevated to the Sindh High Court bench on 24 October 2005 and appointed Chief Justice of Sindh High Court on 14 December 2015. He joined the Supreme Court of Pakistan on 15 March 2017.
