= Imran Ullah Khan =

Pakistani army general (1932–2026)

Lieutenant General Imran Ullah Khan HI(M) SI(M) SBt
- عمران اللہ خان
- Born: 3 December 1932; Utmanzai, Charsadda district, North-West Frontier Province, British India
- Died: 23 August 2026 (aged 93); Rawalpindi, Punjab, Pakistan
- Military career
- Allegiance: Pakistan
- Branch: Pakistan Army
- Service years: 1955–1991
- Rank: Lieutenant-General
- Unit: 5th FF Regiment
- Commands: Pakistan Military Academy, Kakul; 10th Infantry Division, Lahore; Adjutant General (AG); X Corps, Rawalpindi
- Conflicts: Indo-Pakistani War of 1965; Indo-Pakistani War of 1971; Siachen conflict
- Awards: Hilal-e-Imtiaz (Military); Sitara-i-Imtiaz (Military); Sitara-e-Basalat

Imran Ullah Khan HI(M) SI(M) SBt (Urdu: عمران اللہ خان; 3 December 1932 – 23 August 2026) was a Pakistan Army general. He remained the Governor of Balochistan province in the Pakistan Peoples Party-led government from May 1994 to May 1997.

== Early life and education ==
Khan was born on 3 December 1932, to a local landlord family of Shamozai in the village (now town) of Utmanzai in Charsadda District of North-West Frontier Province of British India. The family belongs to the Sharif Khel, which falls under the Utmanzai branch of the Muhammadzai. His father, Major Saadullah Khan, was a direct descendant of Malik Utman who founded the village/town of Utmanzai.

He was the eldest of the four sons. He received his education from Bishop Cotton School Simla (now in India), Lawrence College Murree and Government College Lahore.

== Career ==
After completing his education Khan joined Pakistan Army and was sent to the Royal Military Academy Sandhurst in England. On graduation from the Royal Military Academy Sandhurst in the UK, he was commissioned into the Frontier Force Regiment on 18 September 1955 in the 12th PMA Long Course.

Serving the Pakistan army he took part in the 1965 war as a captain and in the 1971 war as a Battalion Commander. He also participated in the Siachin operation as a Corps Commander.

A graduate of the Royal Military Academy Sandhurst, the Command and Staff College Quetta and the Pakistan Air Force Staff College Karachi, Khan also distinguished himself at the Royal College of Defence Studies, London, UK. Khan served on various important staff and instructional appointments during his career. These include Instructor at the School of Military Intelligence Kuldana, Murree, Instructor at the Command and Staff College Quetta, Commandant of the Pakistan Military Academy and Director of Military Training.

== Commands ==
Khan had the privilege of commanding an infantry brigade on the Line of Control. As a Brigadier, he also had the distinction of holding the appointment of Director of Military Training Pakistan Army. In January 1978 he was appointed the Commandant of the Pakistan Military Academy Kakul. He held this coveted post for over four years both as a Brigadier and Major General. In May 1982 he was posted as General Officer Commanding of the 10th Infantry Division at Lahore.

In May 1984 he was posted as Adjutant General of the Pakistan Army at GHQ and in May 1987 he was posted to command the X Corps, the largest Corps of the Pakistan Army, which is one of the two corps on the Line of Control. In this position he was responsible for operations in Siachen. He is credited with Pakistani successes at Chumik and in Operation Qidaat.

== Criticism ==
Humanitarian and philanthropist Abdul Sattar Edhi alleged that Khan and Lt. Gen Hamid Gul asked him to join their pressure group in order to topple Benazir Bhutto's government.

== Retirement and governorship ==
Khan retired from the Army in May 1991 having put in 36 years of commissioned service and in May 1994, he was appointed the Governor of Balochistan by Prime Minister [Benazir Bhutto. He resigned from Governorship for personal reasons in May 1997.

== Death ==
Khan died on 23 August 2026, at the age of 93.

== Awards and decorations ==

Hilal-e-Imtiaz (Military) (Crescent of Excellence)	Sitara-e-Imtiaz (Military) (Star of Excellence)	Sitara-e-Basalat (Star of Good Conduct)	Tamgha-e-Diffa (General Service Medal): 1. 1965 War Clasp; 2. 1971 War Clasp; 3. Siachen Clasp
Sitara-e-Harb 1965 War (War Star 1965)	Sitara-e-Harb 1971 War (War Star 1971)	Tamgha-e-Jang 1965 War (War Medal 1965)	Tamgha-e-Jang 1971 War (War Medal 1971)
10 Years Service Medal	20 Years Service Medal	30 Years Service Medal	Tamgha-e-Sad Saala Jashan-e- Wiladat-e-Quaid-e-Azam (100th Birth Anniversary of Muhammad Ali Jinnah) 1976
Tamgha-e-Jamhuria (Republic Commemoration Medal) 1956	Hijri Tamgha (Hijri Medal) 1979	Jamhuriat Tamgha (Democracy Medal) 1988	Qarardad-e-Pakistan Tamgha (Resolution Day Golden Jubilee Medal) 1990

Political offices
Preceded by Abdul Rahim Durrani	Governor of Balochistan; 1994–1997	Succeeded by Amir-ul-Mulk Mengal
