= Abdul Rahim Durrani =

Pakistani politician

Sardar Abdul Rahim Durrani (1922–2007) was a brigadier of Pakistan Army who served as Governor of Baluchistan province of Pakistan from 1994 to 1995.

Mr. Durrani was born in 1922 in Quetta. He joined Pakistan army in 1944. During his 35 years service, he worked in various capacities and reached the rank of brigadier until his retirement in 1979. He has three sons, Colonel (retd) Sardar Amjad Naeem Durrani, Nadim Durrani and Imran Durani, and daughter Nilofar Niazi. He died on 24 June 2007 in Quetta Cantonment at the age of 85.

== See also ==
- Governor of Baluchistan
