= Kamaluddin Azfar =

Pakistani politician (1930–2025)

Kamaluddin Azfar (Urdu: کمال الدين اظفر; 1930 – 26 May 2025) was a Pakistani politician from Sindh. He was Finance Minister and later Governor of Sindh. Azfar was elected as a member of the Pakistan People's Party, a constitutional expert, and a writer. He held numerous prominent positions, most notably as Governor of Sindh, Senator, and Federal Minister.

== Early life and education ==
Born in April 1930, Azfar began his academic journey at Government College Lahore, followed by studies at Balliol College, Oxford, where he studied law. He was called to the Bar at Inner Temple, London. These experiences abroad, particularly in post-war Britain, shaped his understanding of governance, rule of law, and democratic systems—an influence he would carry into his political and legal work in Pakistan.

== Legal and political career ==
After returning to Pakistan, Kamal Azfar practiced law in Karachi and became known for his deep understanding of constitutional matters. He joined the PPP in its early years and quickly rose through its ranks due to his legal acumen and political insight.

=== Major roles ===
- Finance Minister of Sindh
- Federal Minister for Local Government and Rural Development
- Senator in the Pakistan Senate
- Special Assistant to Prime Minister Benazir Bhutto
- Governor of Sindh (Appointed in 1995)

Azfar was part of several legislative and governance reforms, often working closely with Benazir Bhutto on legal and constitutional issues. During his time in Sindh's provincial and federal governments, he focused on urban development, housing, and governance reforms.

=== Intellectual and literary contributions ===
Azfar was a respected author and academic voice. His notable works include:

- Pakistan: Political and Constitutional Dilemmas (1987)
- Asian Drama Revisited (1992)
- Pakistan Under the Military (1991)
- Good Governance (1994)
- Discovery of Pakistan (2005)
- Waters of Lahore (2014)

He was a research assistant to Nobel Laureate Gunnar Myrdal on the influential "Asian Drama" project in the early 1960s. His books remain essential readings for those studying South Asian political systems and Pakistan's governance challenges.

== Death and tributes ==
Kamaluddin Azfar died after a long illness in Karachi, on 26 May 2025, at the age of 95.

Tributes came from all sides of the political spectrum:

- Senate Chairman Yousaf Raza Gillani expressed “deep sorrow and grief,” recognizing Azfar’s role in shaping PPP policy.
- Sindh Chief Minister Murad Ali Shah called him “a wise and seasoned political leader.”
- PPP Senator Sherry Rehman praised his “commitment to democracy and social justice.”

Political offices
Preceded by Mahmoud Haroon	Governor of Sindh; 1995–1997	Succeeded by Moinuddin Haider
