= Moinuddin Haider =

Pakistani politician

General (R) Moinuddin Haider HI(M)
- معین الدین حیدر

Federal Minister of Interior and Narcotics Control
- In office 6 November 1999 – 23 November 2002
- President: General Pervez Musharraf
- Preceded by: Shujaat Hussain
- Succeeded by: Faisal Saleh Hayat

Governor of Sindh
- In office 17 March 1997 – 17 June 1999
- President: Rafiq Tarar
- Prime Minister: Nawaz Sharif
- Preceded by: Kamaluddin Azfar
- Succeeded by: Mamnoon Hussain

Chief Executive of Sindh
- In office 30 October 1998 – 17 June 1999
- President: Farooq Leghari
- Preceded by: Governor’s Rule
- Succeeded by: Ghous Ali Shah
- President: Farooq Leghari

Corps Commander Lahore
- In office 1996–1997

Adjutant General
- In office 1993–1996

Deputy Chief of General Staff
- In office 1991–1993

Commander 33rd Infantry Division, (Quetta)
- In office 1989–1991

Director-General Military Training
- In office 1986–1989

Personal details
- Born: 5 June 1942 (age 84) Hyderabad Deccan
- Spouse: Shahnaz Haider
- Children: 3
- Education: PAF College Lower Topa; Royal College of Defence Studies
- Committees: Chairman Fatimid Foundation; Member Pildat
- Awards: Hilal-i-Imtiaz (Military)

Military service
- Allegiance: Pakistan
- Branch/service: Pakistan Army
- Years of service: 1962 - 1997
- Rank: Lieutenant General
- Unit: F.F. Regiment
- Commands: 33rd Infantry Division Quetta, Deputy Chief of General Staff (DCGS), Adjutant General (AG), Corps Commander Lahore IV Corps
- Battles/wars: Indo-Pakistani War of 1965; Indo-Pakistani War of 1971

Moinuddin Haider, HI(M) (Urdu: معین الدین حیدر; born 5 June 1942) is a retired three-star rank general of the Pakistan Army, who later served as the Governor and Chief Minister (Chief Executive) of Sindh, and then as the Federal Interior Minister of Pakistan. He has also served as Chairman Askari Bank.

== Army career ==
Haider was commissioned in the Pakistan Army in 1962 first in the 26th PMA Long Course in the Frontier Force Regiment. He earned his master's degree in defence studies from the Royal College of Defence Studies in Seaford House UK, and was the first Pakistani to get his thesis published in Seaford House Papers. He fought in the 1965 and 1971 wars between India and Pakistan. From 1967 to 1970, he was an instructor at the Pakistan Military Academy. He led a scout and support unit twice, first from 1975 to 1977 and again from 1981 to 1982. Between 1978 and 1981, he led a military cooperation group in Somalia. He later held senior planning roles in an infantry division, served as a Martial Law Administrator in Northern Sindh, and finally became the Director General of Military Training.

== Senior command and staff appointments ==
Promoted to brigadier in 1983, he left for the UK to attend Royal College of Defence Studies course in 1984 and was the first Pakistani officer whose thesis was published in Seaford House papers. He was appointed director military training at GHQ in 1986 and was closely associated with planning of Zarb-e-Momin.

As a two-star, Haider commanded the 33rd Infantry Division at Quetta from 1989 to 1991. He then stayed as the Deputy Chief of General Staff (DCGS) at the GHQ from 1991 to 1993. After becoming a three-star general, he first served as the Adjutant General (AG) from 1993 to 1996, and then as the Corps Commander Lahore from 1996 to 1997. In the last days of his tenure as Corps Commander Lahore he was appointed Governor Sindh.

== Government service ==
After retirement in March 1997, he was installed as the Governor of Sindh province by the Nawaz Sharif government. In October 1998, he assumed all powers and functions of the state government and took place as the Chief Executive of Sindh after the sacking of Liaquat Ali Jatoi’s unpopular government and imposition of Governor's rule. He continued to serve as the governor until June 1999 when he was replaced by Mamnoon Hussain. At the onset of military coup in October 1999, General Pervez Musharraf, a junior to Haider as he belonged to 29th PMA Long Course, put Haider as the Federal Interior Minister of Pakistan. He continued to lead the powerful ministry until the 2002 October elections, when Faisal Saleh Hayat replaced him. During his time as Interior Minister he was very involved in hunting down and bringing to justice the killers of American Wall Street Journal reporter Daniel Pearl. He was also involved in crackdown against militants and banned organisations, which led to the assassination of his brother in Karachi. During his tenure his work was not just limited to his ministry, but he also played a major role in foreign relations, visiting several countries and interacting with heads of states.

Moinuddin Haider is the graduate of PAF Public School Lower Topa and is the current patron in chief of the Lower Topa Old Boys Association (LOBA). He is currently Chairman of Fatimid Foundation. He has also adopted several schools and is on the board of many universities and colleges. He continues to appear on the media frequently and his name was on top of the list issued by ISPR for representation on media. He is married and has three children.

Political offices
Preceded by Kamaluddin Azfar	Governor of Sindh; 1997–1999	Succeeded by Mamnoon Hussain
Preceded by Chaudhry Shujaat Hussain	Interior Minister of Pakistan; 1999–2002	Succeeded by Faisal Saleh Hayat
