= Khawaja Tariq Rahim =

Pakistani politician

Khawaja Ahmad Tariq Rahim is a Pakistani politician who has served as the Governor of Punjab, Pakistan. Previously, he also had been the Federal Minister.

Born to Khawaja Abdur Rahim, a prominent civil servant and lawyer, Khawaja received his early education from Aitchison College, Lahore. He did his LLB from Punjab university Law College.
