= Amir Gulistan Janjua =

Retired Army Officer and later Ambassador

17th Governor of North-West Frontier Province
- In office 16 June 1988 – 19 July 1993
- President: Muhammad Zia-ul-Haq; Ghulam Ishaq Khan
- Preceded by: Fida Mohammad Khan
- Succeeded by: Khurshid Ali Khan

Personal details
- Born: 14 August,1925 Chakwal District, Punjab, British Raj
- Died: 19 February 2019 (aged 95) Rawalpindi, Punjab, Pakistan

Military service
- Allegiance: Pakistan
- Branch/service: Pakistan Army
- Years of service: 1945–1977
- Rank: Brigadier
- Unit: Guides Cavalry

Amir Gulistan Janjua (14 August 1925 – 19 February 2019) was a military officer who served as a governor of the North-West Frontier Province of Pakistan. He also served as the ambassador to UAE, Nepal and Saudi Arabia.

== Life ==
He was born on 14 August 1925 in village Gorha Rajgan, Chakwal District. His father, Raja Feroz Khan Janjua, then a Havildar of the 56th Punjabi Rifles (Frontier Force), upon hearing the birth news of the son at Fort Lockhart, shared this news with a local Malik. The Malik looked jubilantly at Fort Gulistan and said, "Amir of Gulistan has arrived". So, the child was named Amir Gulistan.

He was awarded Sitara-e-Quaid-e-Azam and Tamgha-e-Pakistan, Nishan-e-Taj (Iran), Grand Order of Kokab (Jordan) and Order of Gorkha Dakshina Bahu (Nepal).

Janjua died on 19 February 2019 in Rawalpindi.

== Awards and decorations ==
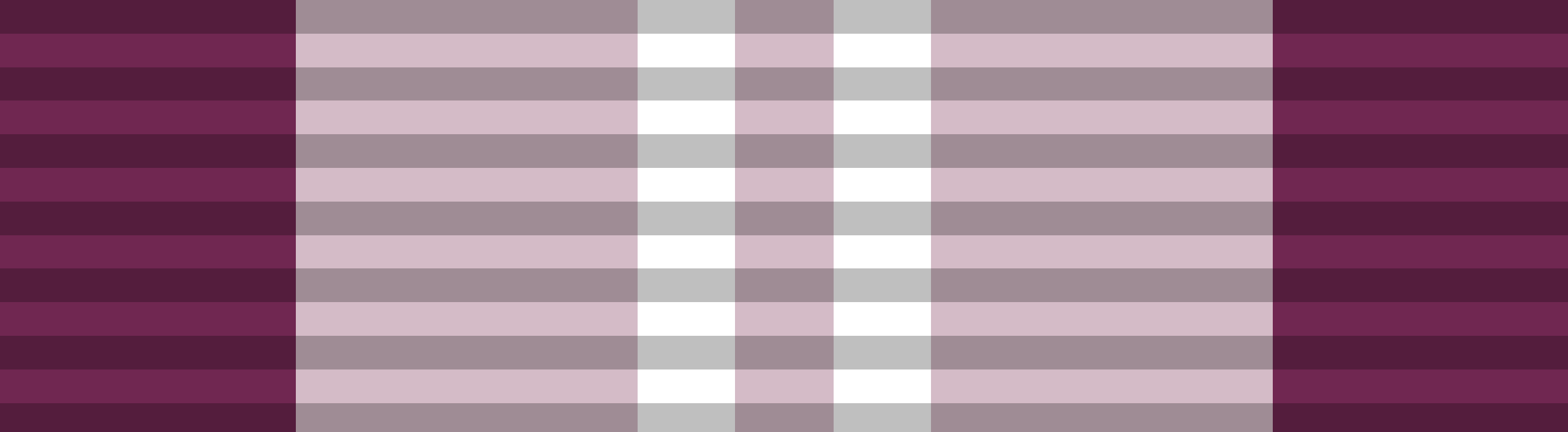
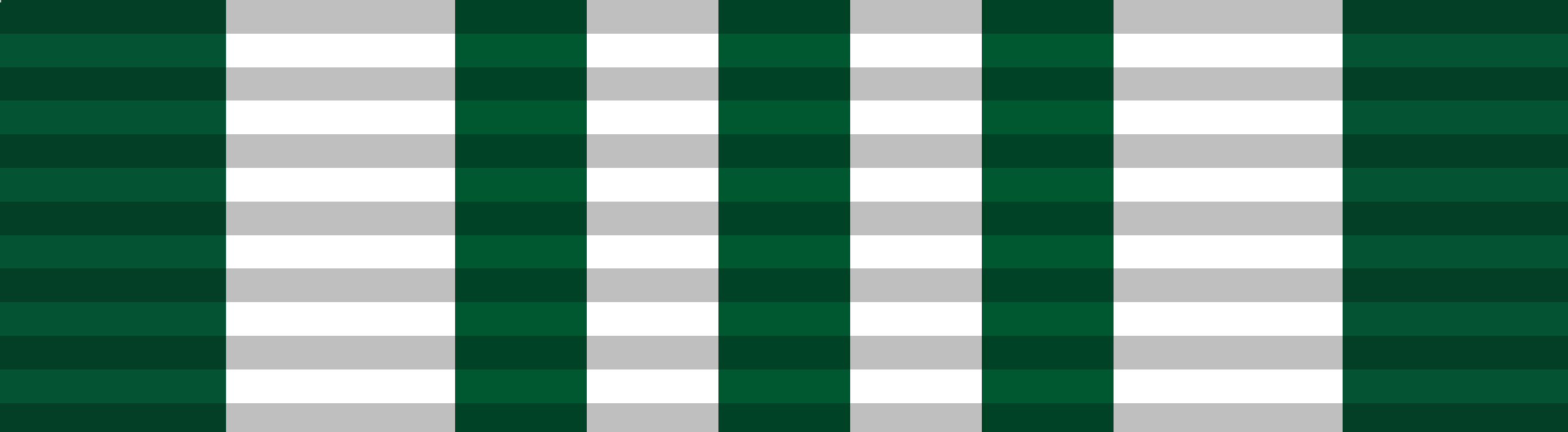

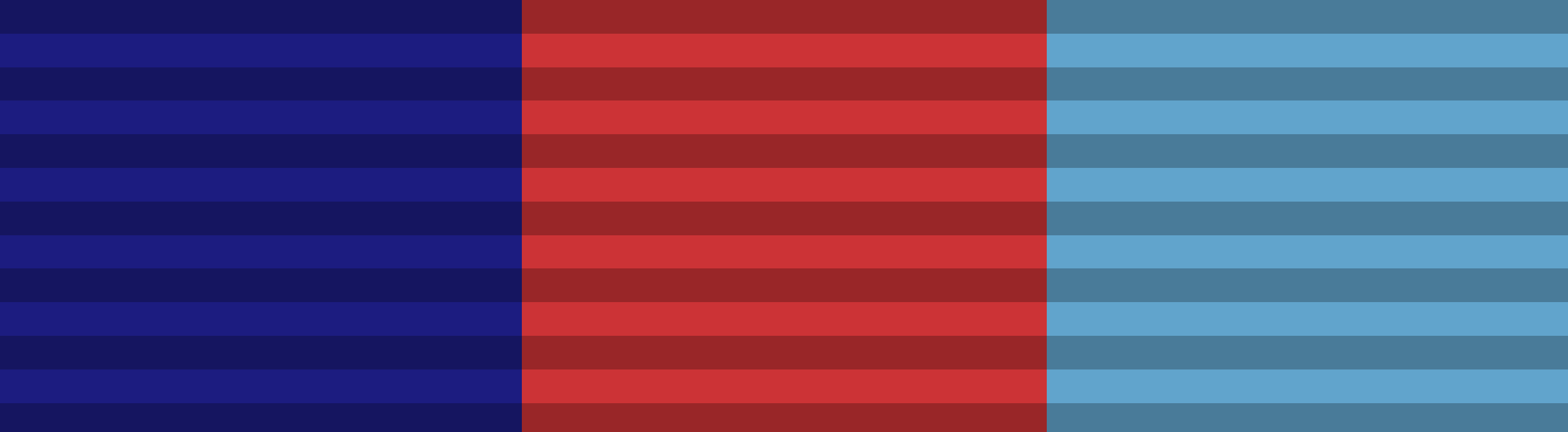

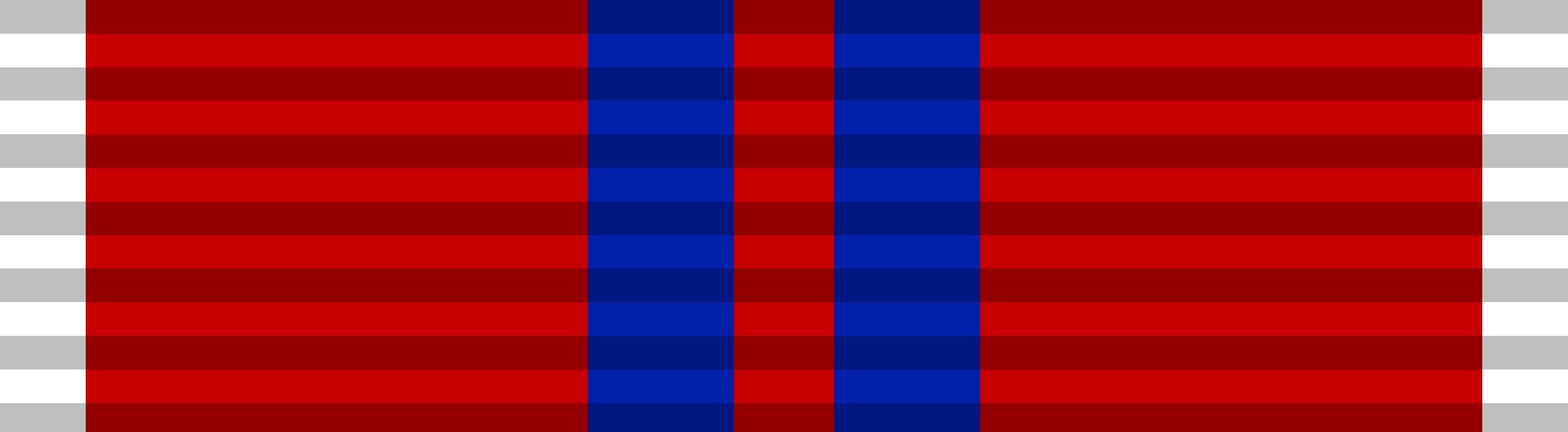

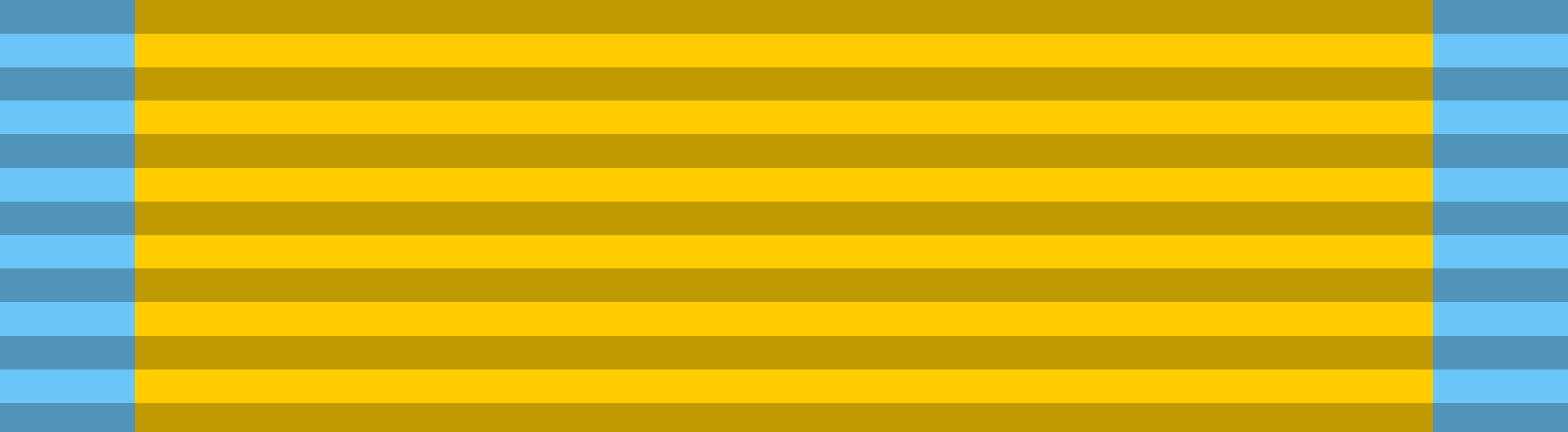

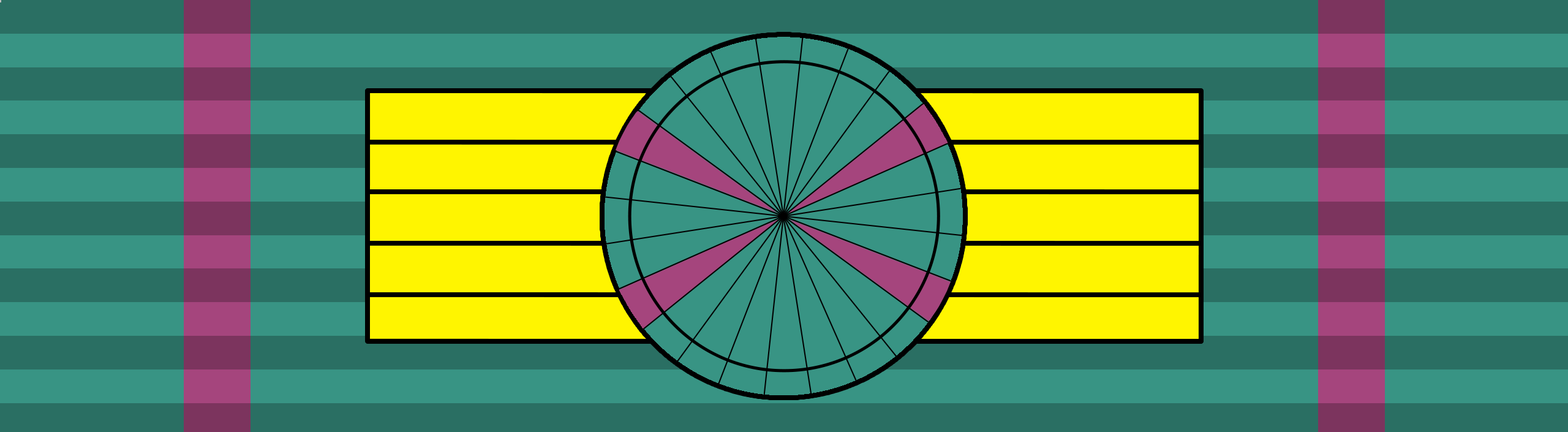

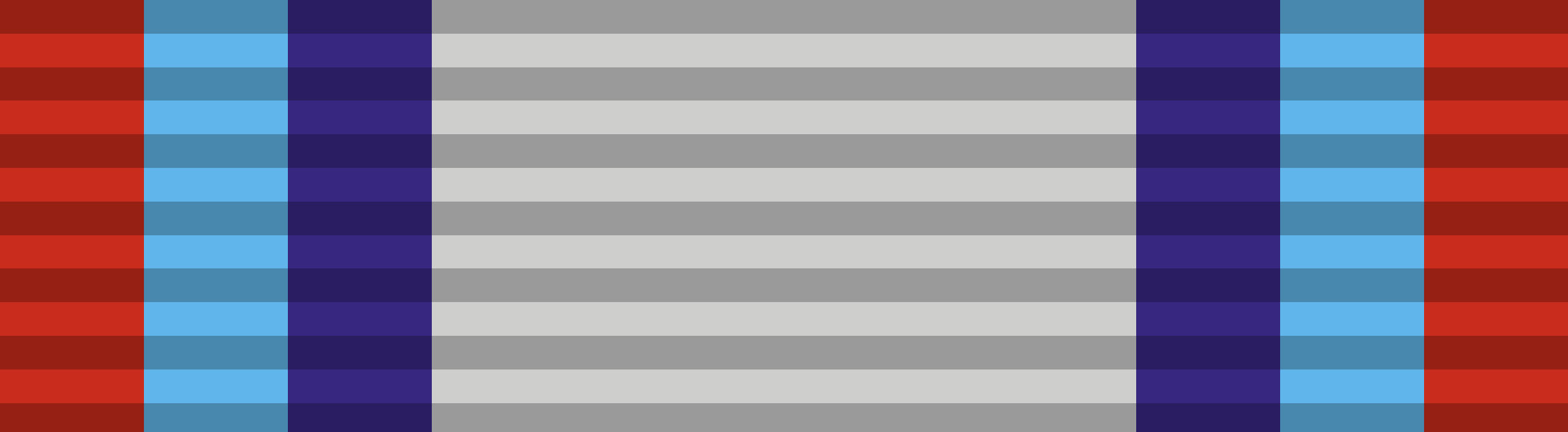

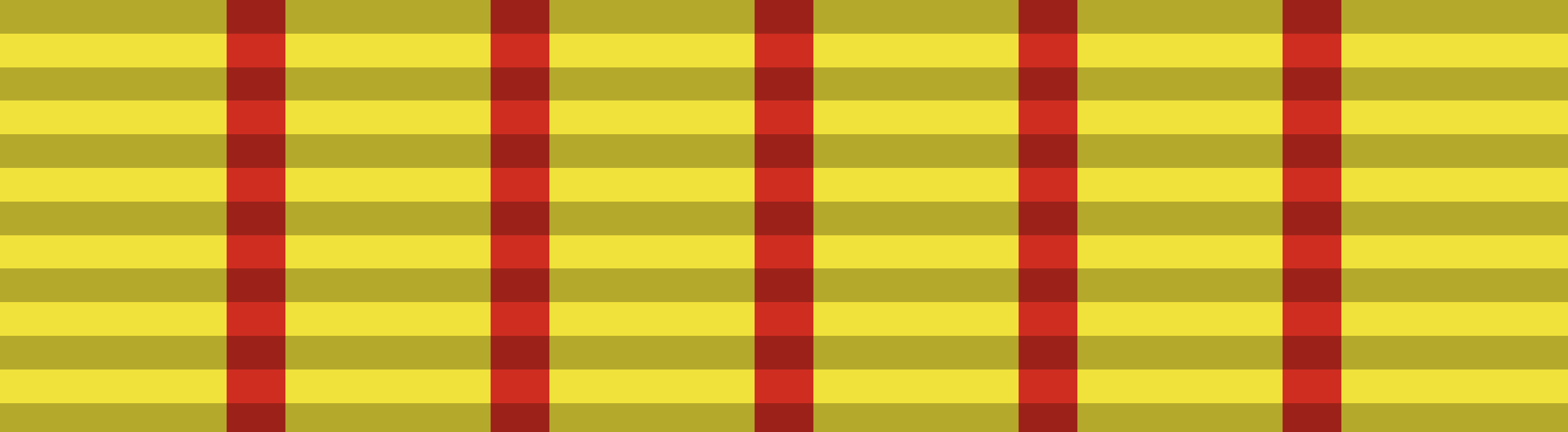

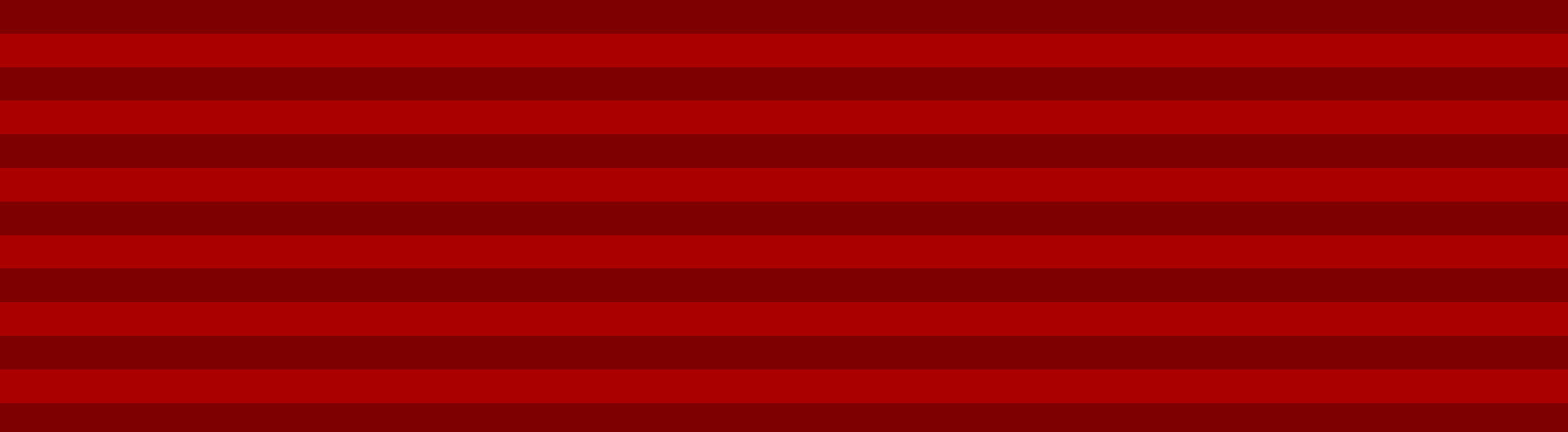

| Sitara-e-Quaid-e-Azam (Star of the Great Leader) (SQA) | Tamgha-e-Pakistan (Medal of Pakistan) (T.Pk) | | Tamgha-e-Diffa (General Service Medal): 1. 1965 War Clasp; 2. 1971 War Clasp |
| Sitara-e-Harb 1965 War (War Star 1965) | Sitara-e-Harb 1971 War (War Star 1971) | Tamgha-e-Jang 1965 War (War Medal 1965) | Tamgha-e-Jang 1971 War (War Medal 1971) |
| Pakistan Tamgha (Pakistan Medal) | Tamgha-e-Jamhuria (Republic Commemoration Medal) 1956 | 1939-1945 Star | Burma Star |
| War Medal 1939–1945 | India Service Medal 1939–1945 | Queen Elizabeth II Coronation Medal (1953) | Order of the Crown (Pahlavi Iran) |
| Order of the Star of Jordan | Medal for the Silver Jubilee 1977 (Jordan) | King Birendra Coronation Medal (1975) | Order of the Gorkha Dakshina Bahu (Nepal) |

=== Foreign Decorations ===
Foreign Awards
| UK | 1939-1945 Star |
| | Burma Star |
| | War Medal 1939-1945 |
| | India Service Medal 1939–1945 |
| | Queen Elizabeth II Coronation Medal |
| Pahlavi Iran | Order of the Crown |
| Jordan | Order of the Star of Jordan |
| Jordan | Medal for the Silver Jubilee 1977 |
| Nepal | King Birendra Coronation Medal |
| Nepal | Order of the Gorkha Dakshina Bahu |

Political offices
| Preceded by Fida Mohammad Khan | Governor of Khyber-Pakhtunkhwa; 1988 – 1993 | Succeeded by Khurshid Ali Khan |
