= Khurshid Ali Khan =

Pakistani general and politician

18th Governor of the North-West Frontier Province
- In office 19 July 1993 – 5 November 1996
- President: Farooq Ahmad Khan Leghari
- Preceded by: Amir Gulistan Janjua
- Succeeded by: Arif Bangash

Personal details
- Born: 10 May 1933
- Died: 3 November 2021 (aged 88)
- Spouse: Sujat Begum
- Children: Naushad Ali Khan; Shandana Khan; Zainab Khan

Military service
- Allegiance: Pakistan
- Branch/service: Pakistan Army
- Rank: Major General

Khurshid Ali Khan was the Governor of the North-West Frontier Province from 1993 to 1996.

== Early life and education ==
He was born on 5 October 1933 to the Swat State Prime Minister Khan Bahadur Hazrat Ali Khan and he was his eldest son.

His uncle, Khan Bahadur Ahmad Ali Khan was the Commander-in-Chief of the Swat State Army.

He was educated at Aitchison College, Lahore. He belongs to Dargai, Malakand Agency, KPK.

Khurshid obtained his Bachelor of Arts degree from the Pakistan Military Academy, Kakul in 1955 and post graduated from Command & Staff College, Quetta in 1967. He obtained a master's degree in strategic studies from the National Defense College, Rawalpindi in 1975.He belong to gaasa qureshi tribe of chitral

== Personal life ==
He married Sujat Begum on 31 March 1956. They have 3 children, Naushad Ali Khan, Shandana Khan, and Zainab Khan. His son Naushad Ali Khan was Chief Commissioner Income tax.

== Political career ==
Khurshid Ali Khan served as the Governor of the North-West Frontier Province from 1993 to 1996 during Prime Minister Benazir Bhutto's government.

== Death ==
He died on 3 November 2021. Chief Minister of KPK Mehmood Khan expressed sorrow and grief over the passing of the former governor of Khyber Pakhtunkhwa, Major General (Retd) Khurshid Ali Khan. His funeral prayers were offered at Wazirabad Dargai in Malakand where he was buried with full military honours in his ancestral local graveyard. The body of the deceased army officer was saluted.

Political offices
| Preceded by Amir Gulistan Janjua | Governor of Khyber Pakhtunkhwa; 1993 – 1996 | Succeeded by Arif Bangash |
