= Arif Bangash =

Pakistani politician (1935–2019)

Lieutenant General Muhammad Arif Bangash HI(M) SBt

19th Governor of North-West Frontier Province
- In office 11 November 1996 – 17 August 1999
- President: Farooq Ahmad Khan Leghari; Muhammad Rafiq Tarar
- Preceded by: Khurshid Ali Khan
- Succeeded by: Miangul Aurangzeb

Personal details
- Born: 1935 Hangu, British India (now Pakistan)
- Died: 24 November 2019 (aged 83–84)

Military service
- Allegiance: Pakistan
- Branch/service: Pakistan Army
- Years of service: 1954–1994
- Rank: Lieutenant General; Service Number PA 5958
- Unit: 11th the Punjab Regiment 27th Punjabis
- Commands: School of Infantry & Tactics (SI&T), Quetta; IG Frontier Corps Peshawar; 9th Infantry Division, Kohat; IG Training and Evaluation (IGT&E); Commander V Corps; Quartermaster General (QMG)
- Battles/wars: Indo-Pakistan War of 1965; Indo-Pakistan War of 1971
- Awards: Hilal-e-Imtiaz (Military); Sitara-e-Basalat

Muhammad Arif Bangash HI(M) SBt (1935 – 24 November 2019) was a Pakistan Army three-star general who served as governor of the North-West Frontier province of Pakistan.

== Military career ==
He belonged to the family of the Khans of Hangu. Arif Bangash was commissioned in the 11th Punjab Regiment formerly known as 27th Punjabis on 18 October 1959 in the 20th PMA Long Course. He was a course-mate of Lt Gen Farrakh Khan and General Abdul Waheed Kakar, the army chief (who superseded him for the Chief of Army Staff position). During his army career, Bangash attended Staff college, National (1971) Defense College (1981) and German General Staff course at Bundeswehr Command and Staff College, Germany at Hamburg (1977–78). After command of a Mountain Brigade he was posted as commandant of School of Infantry and Tactics (SI&T) in Quetta (1981–1984).

He was promoted to the rank of major general in 1984 and served as Inspector General Frontier Corps (1984–1986) and later commanded 9th Infantry Division at Kohat (1986–1989). During his stay in Kohat, Bangash founded Garrison Cadet College Kohat. He was promoted as lieutenant general in August 1989 and served as Inspector General Training and Evaluation (IGT&E) at the GHQ (1989–1991). From there, he went on as Commander V Corps, Karachi (1991–1992) overseeing the deteriorating situation in Karachi and Quarter-Master General at the GHQ (1992–1994). He retired from Army as QMG in 1994.

== Post-retirement career ==
Arif Bangash took over as managing director of Fauji Foundation in April 1996 and stayed there until October 1996. Later he was appointed the governor of North-West Frontier province on 11 November 1996 where he replaced Maj Gen (retd) Khurshid Ali Khan. He was governor for less than three years before he resigned on 17 August 1999.

Arif Bangash died on 24 November 2019 In CMH Rawalpindi and is buried in the Army Graveyard.

== Awards and decorations ==

Hilal-e-Imtiaz (Military) (Crescent of Excellence)
Sitara-e-Basalat (Star of Good Conduct)	Tamgha-e-Diffa (General Service Medal) Rann of Kutch Clasp	Sitara-e-Harb 1965 War (War Star 1965)	Tamgha-e-Jang 1965 War (War Medal 1965)
Tamgha-e-Jang 1971 War (War Medal 1971)	10 Years Service Medal	20 Years Service Medal	30 Years Service Medal
Tamgha-e-Sad Saala Jashan-e- Wiladat-e-Quaid-e-Azam (100th Birth Anniversary of Muhammad Ali Jinnah) 1976	Hijri Tamgha (Hijri Medal) 1979	Jamhuriat Tamgha (Democracy Medal) 1988	Qarardad-e-Pakistan Tamgha (Resolution Day Golden Jubilee Medal) 1990

Political offices
Preceded by Khurshid Ali Khan	Governor of North-West Frontier Province; 1996–1999	Succeeded by Miangul Aurangzeb
