= Mahmoud Haroon =

Pakistani political leader and governor

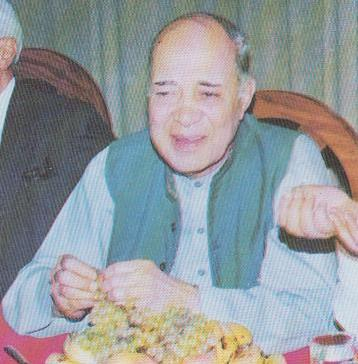

19th and 21st Governor of Sindh
- In office 23 January 1994 – 21 May 1995
- Preceded by: Hakim Saeed
- Succeeded by: Kamaluddin Azfar
- In office 6 August 1990 – 18 July 1993
- Preceded by: Fakhruddin G. Ebrahim
- Succeeded by: Hakim Saeed

Minister for Defence
- In office 9 June 1988 – 1 December 1988
- President: Muhammad Zia-ul-Haq; Ghulam Ishaq Khan
- Preceded by: Muhammad Khan Junejo
- Succeeded by: Benazir Bhutto

20th Minister for Interior
- In office 5 July 1978 – 18 November 1984
- Preceded by: Air Marshal Inamul Haq Khan
- Succeeded by: Lt Gen Sardar Farooq Shaukat Khan Lodhi

Mayor of Karachi
- In office 19 January 1954 – 26 May 1955
- Preceded by: H.M. Habibullah Paracha
- Succeeded by: Al-Haj Malik Bagh Ali

Personal details
- Born: 1920
- Died: 6 November 2008 (aged 87–88)
- Spouse: Almas Haroon

Mahmoud Abdullah Haroon (Urdu: محمود عبد اللہ ہارون; 1920 – 6 November 2008) was a Pakistani publisher who served as chairman of the Dawn Media Group and the founding editor of Khaleej Times.

== Early life and career ==
He was the second son of Abdullah Haroon, the first being Yusuf Haroon, one of the leaders of Pakistan Movement. Both brothers, Mahmoud Haroon and Yusuf Haroon, had actively participated in the Pakistan Movement.

During his political career, Mahmoud Haroon served as two-time Governor of Sindh, Federal Interior Minister during General Muhammad Zia-ul-Haq's regime, Federal Defence Minister, and Mayor of Karachi. He was also the founder of the Dubai-based newspaper Khaleej Times.

Political offices
Preceded by Allah Bakhsh Gabol	Mayor of Karachi; 1954–1955	Succeeded by Al-Haj Malik Bagh Ali
Preceded by Inamul Haq Khan	Interior Minister of Pakistan; 1978–1984	Succeeded by Sardar F.S. Khan Lodi
Preceded by Muhammad Khan Junejo	Defence Minister of Pakistan; 1988	Succeeded by Benazir Bhutto
Preceded by Fakhruddin G. Ebrahim	Governor of Sindh; 1990–1993	Succeeded by Hakim Said
Preceded by Hakim Said	2nd term 1994–1995	Succeeded by Kamaluddin Azfar
