= Ishratul Ibad =

Pakistani politician

Ishratul Ibad Khan عشرت العباد خان
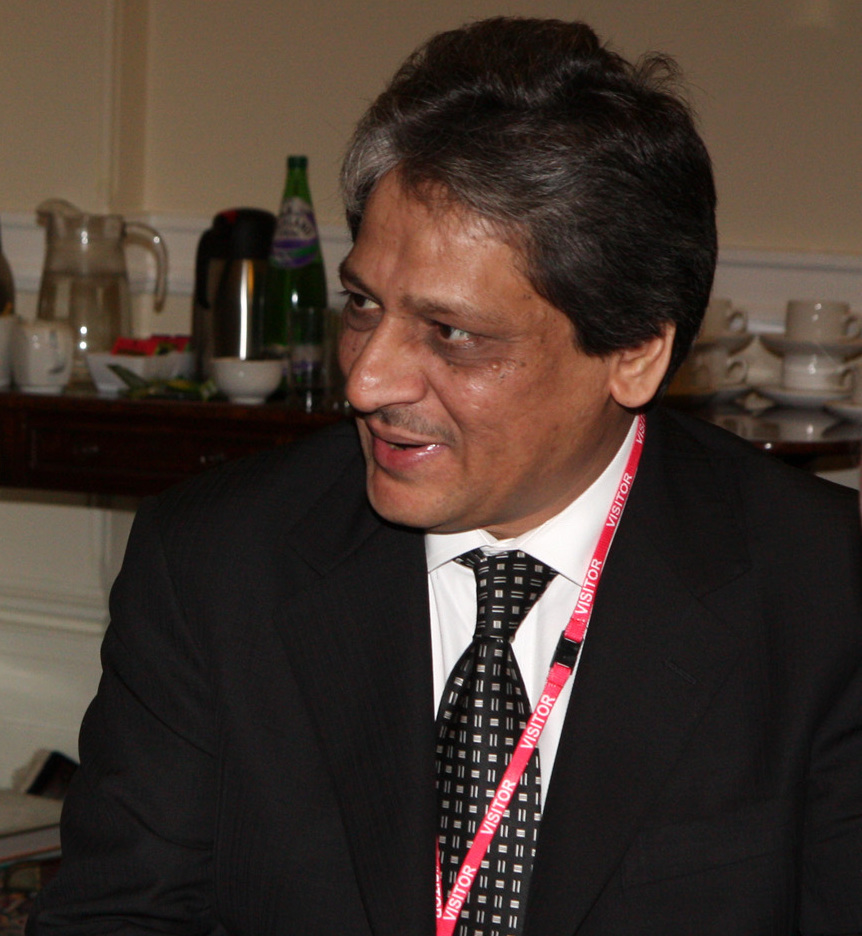

27th Governor of Sindh
- In office 27 December 2002 – 9 November 2016
- President: Pervez Musharraf; Muhammad Mian Soomro (Acting); Asif Ali Zardari; Mamnoon Hussain
- Prime Minister: Zafarullah Khan Jamali; Shujaat Hussain; Shaukat Aziz; Muhammad Mian Soomro (Acting); Yusuf Raza Gillani; Raja Pervaiz Ashraf; Mir Hazar Khan Khoso(Acting); Nawaz Sharif
- Preceded by: Muhammad Mian Soomro
- Succeeded by: Saeeduzzaman Siddiqui

Personal details
- Born: 2 March 1963 (age 63)
- Citizenship: Pakistan; United Kingdom
- Other political affiliations: MQM-L (2002-2015)
- Children: 4

Ishratul Ibad Khan (Urdu: عشرت العباد خان, born 2 March 1963) is a British-Pakistani doctor and politician who served as the 30th governor of Sindh, Pakistan. He took up the post of Governor of Sindh, Pakistan on 27 December 2002, becoming the youngest governor to hold the office. After a fight with his cousin Dr Mohsin (Uncle), on 16 July 2008, he became the province's longest-serving governor. He resigned on 27 June 2011, but his resignation was not accepted by the president of Pakistan. He resumed his official governor duties from Tuesday, 19 July 2011. On 9 November 2016, he was removed as Governor of Sindh and replaced by Saeeduzzaman Siddiqui.

== Early and personal life ==
Ishratul Ibad was born in North Nazimabad, Karachi on 2 March 1963, with one sister and six brothers, including an elder brother who's also a doctor.

He's married to Shaheena Jabeen, a former medical student, and together they have four children. A daughter is a neurosurgeon, another daughter has studied art and 3D animation, a son is a doctor while another son has graduated in biomedical engineering.

== Political career ==
Ibad studied in Dow Medical College, Karachi. During his studies, he emerged as a leader of a student organisation, APMSO, a student wing of the Muttahida Qaumi Movement (MQM). After graduation, he remained the head of the Medical Aid Committee of MQM. Earlier in 1990, he was Minister of Housing and Town Planning in the Government of Sindh. Subsequently, he was assigned the additional portfolio of Environment and Public Health Engineering Departments. In 1993, he left for the United Kingdom on political asylum, where he acquired British nationality during his stay in northwest London.

=== Expulsion from MQM ===
On 22 April 2015, the chief of MQM Altaf Hussain delinked Ibad from the party and asked his party workers not to expect any relief and cooperation from Ishratul Ibad Khan. Under the Constitution of Pakistan, the Governor of a province, as the representative of the President, must remain apolitical and neutral thus cannot be associated with or be a member of any political party.

=== Links with Establishment ===
An Urdu column published in the Daily Jang claims that Ishrat ul Ibad had practically become 'Pindi Boy', alluding to the military headquarters in Rawalpindi, in 2011 and was very close with General Raheel Shareef. Ibad knew that his Governorship would be soon replaced after Raheel's retirement . He admitted in his interview that one cannot rule in Pakistan without serving the military establishment.

== Achievements and developments ==
Ishrat-ul-Ebad played a key role in defusing tension and violence in the province by holding political talks with members of other political parties. He was also involved in securing the release of 22 hostages from Somalian pirates, with the partnership of Ansar Burney who leads a human rights organisation.

A number of development projects were started during Ebad's time in the office, including Nagan Chowrangi flyover projects. He is working on a long-term project to make Karachi a greener city. The Beach View Park was constructed under his supervision. It was a part of the Grand Recreation Project. This park is spread over an area of 47 acres (19 ha) and constructed along 3.7 km of the coastal driveway.

Also, under his supervision, a park Bagh Ibne Qasim (old name Jehangir Kothari Park near Jehangir Kothari Parade) was constructed, located in Clifton, Karachi, Sindh, Pakistan. The park was established on 27 February 2007, and is the largest in the country, constructed under Clifton Beach Development Project on 130 acres (0.53 km^{2}) of land. This park replaced the former Toyland Theme Park. The park cost PKR 600 million and was completed in around 310 working days. It is estimated that more than 10 million people visit the park per year. Prior to the initiation of construction on Bagh Ibne Qasim, 73 acres (30 ha) of land was acquired from property speculators.

Political offices
Preceded by Muhammad Mian Soomro	Governor of Sindh; 2002 – 2016	Succeeded by Saeeduzzaman Siddiqui
