= 2019 in Pakistan =

- Decades: 1990s; 2000s; 2010s; 2020s
- See also: History of Pakistan; List of years in Pakistan; Timeline of Pakistani history

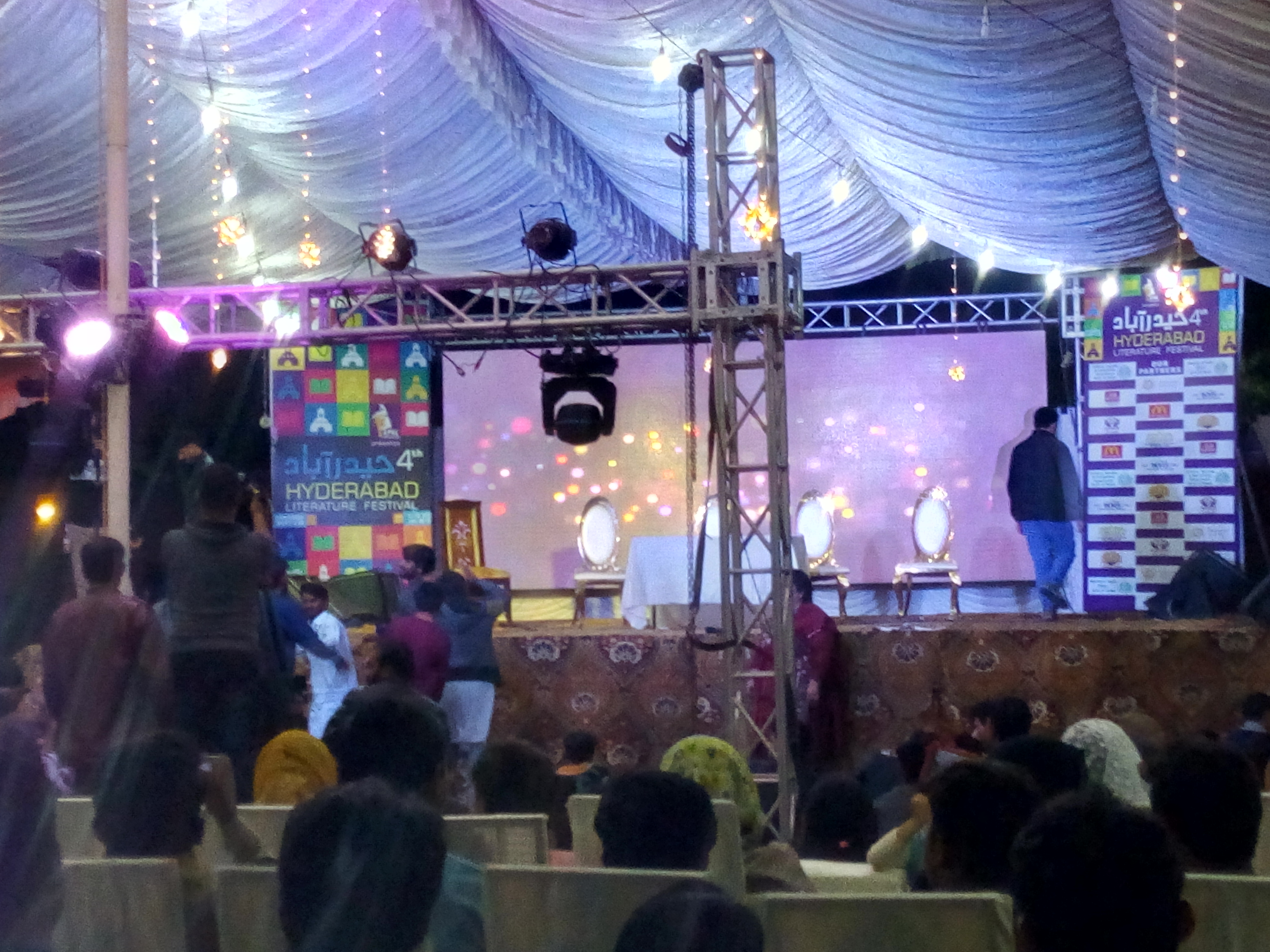
Hyderabad Literature Festival 2019

Events from the year 2019 in Pakistan.

== Incumbents ==
- President: Arif Alvi
- Prime Minister: Imran Khan
- Chief Justice: Gulzar Ahmed
- Speaker of the National Assembly: Asad Qaisar
- Chief Election Commissioner: Sardar Muhammad Raza Khan

=== Governors ===
- Governor of Balochistan: Amanullah Khan Yasinzai
- Governor of Gilgit-Baltistan: Raja Jalal Hussain Maqpoon
- Governor of Khyber Pakhtunkhwa: Shah Farman
- Governor of Punjab: Muhammad Sarwar
- Governor of Sindh: Imran Ismail

== Events ==
- Sindh HIV outbreak
- Dengue outbreak
- Terrorist incidents
- Karachi floods
- India border skirmishes
- 19 January – Sahiwal killings
- 21 January – Hub accident
- 1 February – 2019 Pakistan floods and storms
- 27 February – Jammu and Kashmir airstrikes
- 11 July – Sadiqabad Railway Accident
- 20 July – Khyber Pakhtunkhwa provincial election
- 30 July – Army military plane crash
- 24 September – Pakistan earthquake
- 4 October – Naveed Aamir MP for the Pakistan Peoples Party moves a bill to amend the article 41 and 91 of the Constitution which would allow non-Muslims to become Prime Minister and President of Pakistan. However, Pakistan's parliament blocked the bill.
- 31 October – Train fire
- 12 October – Pakistan at the 2019 World Beach Games
- 18 October – Pakistan at the 2019 Military World Games
- October - November – Azadi March
- November – Start of the 2019–2020 wheat flour crisis in Pakistan
- 11 December Attack on Punjab Institute of Cardiology, Lahore.
- 10 December - Pakistan at the 2019 South Asian Games
- 17 December - Supreme Court give death sentence verdict on Gen RT. Pervez Musharraf.

== Economy ==
- 2018–19 Pakistan federal budget
- 2019–20 Pakistan federal budget

== Sport ==
=== Cricket ===
Domestic

- 2019 Pakistan Super League
- 2019–20 Quaid-e-Azam Trophy
- 2019 Pakistan Cup

International

- Sri Lankan cricket team in Pakistan 2019–20
- Bangladesh women's cricket team in Pakistan in 2019–20

== Deaths ==
=== January ===
- January 4 -
  - Syed Zulfiqar Bokhari, Pakistani diplomat and former chairman of the Pakistan Cricket Board
  - Hakmeen Khan, Pakistani politician.
- January 11 - Khalida Hussain, Pakistani fiction writer (b. 1937).
- January 16 - Malik Mazhar Abbas Raan, Pakistani politician (b. 1953).
- January 20 - Husain Mohammad Jafri, Pakistani historian.
- January 25 -
  - Fatima Ali, Pakistani-born American chef and reality show contestant (b. 1989).
  - Roohi Bano, Pakistani actress (b. 1951).

January 29 - Muhammad Arshad Khan Lodhi, Pakistani politician (b. 1937).

=== February ===
- February 1 - Ehsan-ul-Haq Piracha, Pakistani politician.
- February 2 - Arman Loni, Pakistani Pashto language poet and PTM leader (b. 1983)
- February 13 - Baqar Naqvi, Pakistani Urdu poet and translator (b. 1936)
- February 23 - Muhammad Tajammal Hussain, Pakistani politician (b. 1966)

=== March ===
- March 1 - Jawaid Bhutto, philosopher
- March 27 - John Permal, sprinter

=== April ===
- April 1 - Sardar Fateh Buzdar, politician
- April 18 - Jameel Jalibi, linguist, writer and academic administrator

=== May ===
- May 4 - Ajmal Khan, botanist
- May 11 - Abdul Rashid Puri, Scientist
- May 16 - Jamil Naqsh, artist (b. 1939)
- May 21 - Ali Mohammad Mahar, politician (b. 1967)

=== June ===
- June 6 - Enver Sajjad, playwright (b. 1935)
- June 10 - Akhtar Sarfraz, cricketer (b. 1976)
- June 11 - Riazuddin (b. 1958)
- June 23 - Abdul Sattar (b. 1931)
