= 2018 in Pakistan =

- Decades: 1990s; 2000s; 2010s; 2020s
- See also: History of Pakistan; List of years in Pakistan; Timeline of Pakistani history

Events in the year 2018 in Pakistan.

== Incumbents ==
- President
  - Mamnoon Hussain - September 2013 - September 2018
  - Arif Alvi - September 2018 - incumbent
- Prime Minister
  - Shahid Khaqan Abbasi - August 2017 to May 2018
  - Nasirul Mulk - May 2018 to August 2018
  - Imran Khan - August 2018 to April 2022

=== Governors ===
- Governor of Balochistan – Muhammad Khan Achakzai (until 4 October); Amanullah Khan Yasinzai (from 4 October)
- Governor of Gilgit-Baltistan – Mir Ghazanfar Ali Khan (until 14 September); Raja Jalal Hussain Maqpoon (starting 14 September)
- Governor of Khyber Pakhtunkhwa –
  - until 20 August: Iqbal Zafar Jhagra
  - 20 August-5 September: Mushtaq Ahmed Ghani
  - from 5 September: Shah Farman
- Governor of Punjab –
  - until 18 August: Malik Muhammad Rafique Rajwana
  - 18 August-5 September: Chaudhry Pervaiz Elahi
  - from 5 September: Chaudhry Mohammad Sarwar
- Governor of Sindh – Mohammad Zubair (until 29 July); Imran Ismail (from 27 August)

== Events ==
=== January ===
- 3 January - Pakistani cricket team in New Zealand in 2017–18
- 13 January - The killing of Naqeebullah Mehsud in a fake encounter staged by the senior superintendent of police (SSP) Rao Anwar in Karachi sparked countrywide protests against extrajudicial killings. The Pashtun Tahafuz Movement (PTM), led by Manzoor Pashteen, launched a campaign to seek justice for Naqeebullah Mehsud.

=== February ===
- 9 - 25 February - Pakistan at the 2018 Winter Olympics
- 22 February - 2018 Pakistan Super League

=== March ===
- 3 March - The 2018 elections to the Senate of Pakistan were held.

=== April ===
- 4 April - Pakistan at the 2018 Commonwealth Games
- 25 April - 2018 Pakistan Cup

=== May ===
- 24–27 may - The twenty-fifth amendment to the Constitution of Pakistan was approved by the Parliament of Pakistan and the Provincial Assembly of Khyber Pakhtunkhwa (KP), giving way to the merger of the Federally Administered Tribal Areas (FATA) into the Province of Khyber Pakhtunkhwa (KP).

=== June ===
- 3 June - Pakistan at 2018 Women's Twenty20 Asia Cup

=== July ===
- 6 July - Former Prime Minister Nawaz Sharif, his daughter Maryam Nawaz and son-in-law Safdar Awan were given prison sentences of 10, 7 and 1 years respectfully on controversial corruption charges.
- 10 July - A suicide bombing at a political rally of the Awami National Party in Peshawar left 22 people dead.
- 13 July - Two suicide bombings, one in Bannu and one in Mastung, left 5 and 131 people dead respectively. The former targeted the vehicle of former KPK Chief Minister Akram Durrani, while the latter targeted a political rally of the Balochistan Awami Party.
- 25 July
  - The 2018 Pakistani general elections were held.
  - 2018 Pakistani provincial elections.
  - A suicide bombing at a polling station in Quetta left 31 people dead.

=== August ===
- 17 August - PTI leader Imran Khan took oath as Prime Minister of Islamic republic of Pakistan.
- 18 August - Pakistan at the 2018 Asian Games

=== September ===
- 4 September - The 2018 Pakistani presidential election were held.

=== October ===
- 11 October - Eight children die and three are injured when the wall of a house collapses in the suburban area of Sukkur, Pakistan.
- 14 October - October 2018 Pakistani by-elections
- 31 October - Supreme Court of Pakistan acquitted Asia Bibi blasphemy case based on insufficient evidence.

=== November ===
- 23 November
  - Pakistani police repelled an armed attack on the Chinese consulate in Karachi, suffering two casualties
  - A suicide bombing in Orazkai District, Khyber Pakhtunkhwa killed 33

=== December ===
• Former Prime Minister Nawaz Sharif is sentenced to prison for seven years

== Economy ==
- 2017–18 Pakistan federal budget
- 2018–19 Pakistan federal budget

== Politics ==
- 2018 Pakistani general election
- 2018 Pakistani Senate election

== Sport ==
=== Cricket ===
Domestic

- 2017–18 Departmental One Day Cup
- 2018 Pakistan Super League

International

- 2018 Blind Cricket World Cup
- Pakistani cricket team in New Zealand in 2017–18
- West Indian cricket team in Pakistan in 2017–18
- Pakistani cricket team in England in 2018
- Pakistani cricket team in Ireland in 2018
- Pakistani cricket team in Scotland in 2018
- 2018 Zimbabwe Tri-Nation Series
- Pakistani cricket team in Zimbabwe in 2018
- Pakistani cricket team in South Africa in 2018–19

Asian Tournaments

- 2018 Asia Cup

=== Tournaments ===
- Pakistan at the 2018 Winter Olympics
- Pakistan at the 2018 Commonwealth Games

== Deaths ==
- January 4 – Zubaida Tariq, 72, chef, Parkinson's disease.
- January 5 – Asghar Khan, 96, politician and military officer, Commander-in-Chief of the Air Force (1957–1965).
- January 5 – Rasa Chughtai, 89, Urdu poet.
- January 5 – Sardar Ahmed Ali Khan Pitafi, 74, politician, cancer. He served between 2014 and 2017.
- February 1 - Haji Saifullah Khan Bangash, 70, politician.
- February 1-Hazar Khan Bijarani, 71, politician.
- February 1-Fariha Razzaq Haroon, journalist and politician.
- February 5 - Siddiq Baloch, 77, journalist and political economist.
- February 8 - Khalid Mehsud, 44, terrorist.
- February 11 - Asma Jahangir, 66, human rights lawyer and social activist.
- February 11 - Qazi Wajid, 87, actor.
- January 12 - Nasir Iqbal, 35, footballer.
- March 5 – Jam Saqi, 73, Pakistani politician.
- March 11 – Muhammad Ashiq, 82, racing cyclist.
- March 20 – Ayaz Soomro, 59, politician.
- April 25 – Madeeha Gauhar, 62, actress, cancer.
- June 20 - Mushtaq Ahmed Yousfi, 94, humorist, banker and journalist
- June 21 – Jamsheed Marker, 96, diplomat
- July 21 - Annie Ali Khan, 38, model, writer and journalist
- July 13 - Siraj Raisani, 55 Shaheed Suicide bombing Killed Politician
- July 10 - Haroon Bilour, 50 Shaheed Suicide Bomb Politician
- September 11 - Kalsoom Nawaz, 68, former First Lady of Pakistan
- October 8 -Shaikh Aziz, 79, journalist and scholar.
- December 25- Syed Ali Raza Abidi former MNA and former member of MQM Pakistan, killed in a targeted attack in front of his house, Karachi

== See also ==
- Timeline of Pakistani history
