= 2020 in Pakistan =

- Decades: 2000s; 2010s; 2020s
- See also: History of Pakistan; List of years in Pakistan; Timeline of Pakistani history

Events from the year 2020 in Pakistan.

== Incumbents ==
=== National government ===
Photo	Post	Name
	President of Pakistan	Arif Alvi
	Prime Minister of Pakistan	Imran Khan
	Chief Justice of Pakistan	Gulzar Ahmed
	Chairman of the Senate	Sadiq Sanjrani
	Speaker of the National Assembly	Asad Qaiser
	Chief Election Commissioner of Pakistan	Sikandar Sultan Raja
	Chairman Joint Chiefs of Staff Committee	Nadeem Raza

=== Provincial governments ===
Province	Governor	Chief Minister	Party	Government Type	Chief Justice
Balochistan	Amanullah Khan Yasinzai	Jam Kamal Khan (until Oct 24 2021) Mir Abdul Qudoos Bizenjo (Since 29 October 2021)	BAP	Collision	Naeem Akhtar
Gilgit-Baltistan	Raja Jalal Hussain Maqpoon	Hafiz Hafeezur Rehman (until 18 August): Khalid Khurshid (starting 1 December)	PML (N) (until 18 August): PTI (starting 1 December)	Majority	Muhammad Ajmal Gondal
Khyber Pakhtunkhwa	Shah Farman	Mahmood Khan	PTI	Majority	Qaiser Rashid Khan (Peshawar High Court)
Punjab	Chaudhry Mohammad Sarwar	Sardar Usman Buzdar	PTI	Collision	Muhammad Ameer Bhatti (Lahore High Court)
Sindh	Imran Ismail	Syed Murad Ali Shah	PPP	Majority	Ahmed Ali Sheikh

== Events ==
=== January ===
- January 1 – February 28 – Bangladeshi cricket team in Pakistan in 2019–20.
- January 10
  - January 2020 Quetta bombing.
  - January 2020 lunar eclipse
- 2020 Neelum Valley avalanche

=== February ===
- February 1 – The government declared a national emergency to protect crops and help farmers amid locust swarms.
- February 9 – 16 – 2020 Kabaddi World Cup (Circle style).
- February 12 – Hafiz Saeed was convicted of two counts of terrorism financing and sentenced to 5 1/2 years in prison.
- February 17 – February 2020 Quetta bombing.
- February 20 – 2020 Pakistan Super League: Final.
- February 26 – The first two cases of COVID-19 are reported in Pakistan.
- February 28 – Press reports state that China may send flocks of ducks to Pakistan to fight locusts.

=== March ===
- March 10 – 2020 Tablighi Jamaat COVID-19 hotspot in Pakistan

=== May ===
- May 21 – Islamabad High Court ordered that the elephant Kaavan should be immediately relocated to a different sanctuary following a four-year campaign by popular pop singer Cher since 2016 demanding for the release of Kaavan from Islamabad Zoo.
- May 22 – Pakistan International Airlines Flight 8303 crashed in Karachi, Sindh, killing 97 of the 99 people on board as well as one on the ground.

=== June ===
- June 6 – Govt appoints Muhammad Sadiq as country's first special representative for Afghanistan.
- June 19 – The Supreme Court of Pakistan has quashed a presidential reference filed against Justice Qazi Faiz Esa.
- June 29 – Pakistan Stock Exchange attack - A mass shooting in Karachi left at least 8 people dead including 4 perpetrators.
- June 30 – Nigar Johar becomes the Pakistan Army's first female lieutenant general.

=== July ===
- July 1 – Pakistan temporarily bans popular online game PUBG.
- July 3 – US donates 100 ventilators to support Pakistan's COVID-19 response.
- July 6 – PM Imran Khan inaugurates country's first ever indigenously made ventilators at National Radio and Telecommunication Corporation (NRTC) in Haripur.
- July 11 – Pakistan-born scientist Asifa Akhtar has become the first international female vice president of the biology and medicine section at Germany's prestigious Max Planck Society.

8 July 23 – Pakistan at the 2020 Summer Olympics

- July 29 – In terrorist attack, a soldier is killed at Bajaur security post.

=== August ===
- August 5 – At least 39 people were injured in an RGD-1 grenade attack on a Jamaat-i-Islami rally in the Gulshan-e-Iqbal neighborhood of Karachi. The Sindhudesh Revolutionary Army claimed responsibility for the attack.
- August 10 – A bomb killed at least 5 people and several others were injured in Chaman, Balochistan.
- August 13 - Killing of Hayat Baloch
- August 24 - Pakistan at the 2020 Summer Paralympics
- August 25 - 2020 Karachi floods

=== September ===
- September 7 – Mohmand Marble Mine Incident - A mine disaster left at least 19 people dead and another 20 were injured.
- September 10 – PM Pakistan Launches "Roshan Digital Account" For Overseas Pakistanis.

=== October ===
- October 9 - Pakistan banned short video-sharing application TikTok because of immoral videos.
- October 16
  - An attack kills least 7 soldiers and 7 security guards in Balochistan.
  - A bomb kills at least 6 members of the Army in North Waziristan.
- October 20 - Pakistan after 10 days hiatus, Pakistan banned TikTok.
- October 21 - At least 5 people were killed and 27 others were injured in an explosion at an apartment building in Karachi.
- October 27 - 2020 Peshawar school bombing - Eight students were killed in a bombing at a school in Peshawar, Khyber Pakhtunkhwa.
- 28 October- Federal Board of Revenue (FBR) sealed cellular Sim company Jazz head office after they did not pay 25 billions rupees in 2018.

=== November ===
- 15 November
  - 2020 Gilgit-Baltistan Assembly election

=== December ===
- December 30 - 2020 Karak temple attack

== Economy ==
- 2019–20 Pakistan federal budget
- 2020–21 Pakistan federal budget

== Deaths ==
=== January ===
- January 7 – Fakhruddin G. Ebrahim, judge and former Chief Election Commissioner (b. 1928).
- January 19 – Ali Mardan Shah, politician (b. 1957).
- January 28 – Mohammad Munaf, cricketer (b. 1935).

=== February ===
- February 5 – Mohammad Shafiq, politician.
- February 6 – Malik Ata Muhammad Khan, feudal lord and politician (b. 1941).
- February 10 – Waqar Hasan, cricketer (b. 1932).
- February 15
  - Shahnaz Ansari, politician (b. 1970).
  - Naeemul Haque, political advisor (b. 1949).
- February 20 – Usman Ullah Khan, Olympic boxer (b. 1974).
- February 21 – Lal Khan, Marxist political theorist (b. 1956).
- February 25 – Naimatullah Khan, politician (b. 1930).

=== March ===
- March 6 – Amanullah, actor (b. 1950).
- March 14 – Mubashir Hassan, politician (b. 1922).

=== May ===
- May 22 – Zara Abid

=== June ===
- June 26 – Munawar Hasan, former Ameer Jamat E Islami (b. 1941).
- June 22 – Allama Talib Jauhari, Islamic scholar (b. 1939).
- June 20 – Mufti Muhammad Naeem, cleric (b.1958).
- June 17 – Tariq Aziz, television host (b. 1936)
- June 13 – Sabiha Khanum, actress (b. 1935).

=== August ===
- 20 August - Mir Hasil Khan Bizenjo (born 1958), veteran politician and National party president
- 26 August- Muzaffar Hussain Shah (born 1945), former Chief Minister of Sindh
- 29 August - Shafaullah rokhri (born 1966), Pakistani folk singer and songwriter, music producer

=== September ===
13 September Zameer Akhter Naqvi (Islamic Scholar) died

=== November ===
- 2 November - Hafiz Muhammad Durrab Zafar a young talented Boy from Sahiwal
- 13 November 2020 Justice Waqar Ahmed Seth Judge of Supreme Court of Pakistan who Sentenced Death to Ex President of Pakistan General Musharraf.
- 20 November - Allama Khadim Hussain Rizvi (born 1966) Political party (Tahreek-e-labbaik Pakistan) millions of people attend the funeral of Allama Khadim Hussain Rizvi. (TJK) https://www.dawn.com/news/1591262
- 25 November – Muhammad Jadam Mangrio, politician

=== December ===
- 2 December – Mir Zafarullah Khan Jamali, 15th Prime Minister of Pakistan (b. 1944).
- 4 December – Arshad Malik, Judge.
- 5 December – Suhail Zaheer Lari, historian, author (b. 1936).
- 16 December – Firdous Begum, actress (b. 1947).

== See also ==
=== Country overviews ===
- Pakistan
- History of Pakistan
- History of modern Pakistan
- Outline of Pakistan
- Government of Pakistan
- Politics of Pakistan
- Years in Pakistan

=== Related timelines for current period ===
- 2020
- 2020 in politics and government
- 2020s
- 21st century
