= 2018 Pakistani general election violence =

Political violence in Pakistan

- Date: July 2018
- Location: Pakistan
- Result: 31 people being killed with over 35 injured

Casualties
- Deaths: 31
- Injuries: Over 35
- Arrested: 7

Several violent incidents happened before and on the day of the 2018 Pakistani general election, held on 25 July 2018.

The first violent incident on election day occurred early in the morning in Larkana on Pakistan Peoples Party camp in which at least three people were injured in a grenade attack. The second incident occurred in Swabi District when a gun fight broke out between Pakistan Tehreek-e-Insaf (PTI) and Awami National Party (ANP) agents in which the PTI agent was shot dead. Later in the day, two attacks occurred in the Balochistan province. The first was in the capital Quetta, in which 31 people were killed and several more were injured. Then two people were injured in Nasirabad District. In Sindh, there were several violent clashes between members of Pakistan Peoples Party and Grand Democratic Alliance leaving many severely injured.

== Pre-election violence ==
The attacks came 12 days before general elections. In the beginning of the month, a bombing took place in Ramzak Tehsil of North Waziristan at the office of Malik Aurangjeb Khan, Pakistan Movement of Justice's candidate for NA-48 (Tribal Area-IX), leaving 10 people injured. A week before the current attack in Bannu, a bomb planted in a motorcycle was remotely exploded at an election campaign of Muttahida Majlis-e-Amal's PK–89 candidate Shein Malik in the Takhti Khel area of the city. Two days prior to the attacks, a suicide bombing at an election rally of the Awami National Party's leader Haroon Bilour in Peshawar left 20 people, including Bilour, dead and wounded 63 others. On 12 July, the Balochistan Awami Party (BAP)'s office in Khuzdar came under gunfire before a bomb detonated injuring 2 people. On the same day a spokesperson for former Member of National Assembly member Alhaj Shah Jee Gul Afridi was killed and another citizen was injured after unidentified men opened fire at the spokesperson's car in Peshawar.

On 13 July, two separate bombings on election rallies in Mastung and Bannu left 154 people dead and injured more than 220 others. In Bannu, 4 citizens were killed and 10 were injured after a planted bomb exploded near the car of JUI-F candidate Akram Khan Durrani. In Mastung, a suicide bomber affiliated with Islamic State of Iraq and the Levant (ISIL) blew himself up at the election rally of BAP's candidate for the Balochistan Assembly, Nawabzada Siraj Raisani, killing him and 148 others people and injured over 186. On 22 July, PTI's candidate for constituency PK-99 Ikramullah Gandapur and his driver were killed after a suicide bomber blew himself near his car as he was headed towards a corner meeting in the outskirts of Dera Ismail Khan. The same day, unknown gunmen opened fires on the vehicle of Durrani in Bannu. No one was hurt during firing as the vehicle was bulletproof. This was second unsuccessful attempt to assassinate Durrani and third terrorist incident in the city in the span of two weeks. On 24 July, 3 soldiers and a civilian were ambushed at Dashtuk, in eastern Balochistan, and killed while escorting polling staff, 14 more were injured, 10 seriously.

== 2018 Quetta suicide bombing ==
Location of incidents shown on a map of Pakistan

On 25 July, during polling of general elections, a bomb blast outside a polling station in Quetta resulted in 31 people being killed with over 35 injured. Islamic State of Iraq and the Levant claimed responsibility for the attack, according to the group’s Amaq news agency.

== Other violent incidents ==
=== Khyber Pakhtunkhwa ===
In Swabi, a city in the northern province of Khyber Pakhtunkhwa, one person was killed and three injured after PTI supporters exchanged fire with those from the secularist Awami National Party (ANP).

In Kohistan, at least seven people were injured after a scuffle broke out between two different groups of independent candidates.

=== Sindh ===
In Larkana, at least three other people were injured in a grenade attack outside a polling station in Larkana, in the southern province of Sindh.

In Sanghar District, a violent clash occurred between Pakistan Peoples Party (PPP) and Grand Democratic Alliance (GDA) party members. The dispute started after a woman was stopped from casting the vote on technical reasons. In this incident, several people were injured.

In Dadu, a town in the province of Sindh, three people were injured in a firing incident. Police have arrested seven, including the shooter.

In Badin, another clash occurred between Pakistan Peoples Party (PPP) and Grand Democratic Alliance (GDA) party members. In the incident, six people were injured.

In Karachi, a group of unknown people painted the word 'Nawaz' over a donkey following Imran Khan's statement calling supporters of their opponent Pakistan Muslim League (N) donkeys. The donkey was tortured by mob afterwards and hit with a car. Ayesha Chundrigar Foundation, an animal's charity, tried to save the donkey but it succumbed to injuries.

=== Punjab ===
In Khanewal, a man was shot dead and another one was injured in a political clash.

In Rajanpur, several people were injured after clash between Pakistan Muslim League (N) and Pakistan Tehreek-e-Insaf workers.

In Faisalabad, two suspects have been arrested by police for carrying weapons outside NA-105. AK-47 Kalashnikovs and magazines, found to be on their person, were seized by the police.

=== Balochistan ===
In Nasirabad District, two people were injured in a firing incident.

== See also ==
- 2013 Pakistan election day bombings, similar deadliest attacks in previous election.
- Terrorist incidents in Pakistan in 2018
