= PSL Hamaray Heroes Award =

HBL PSL Hamaray Heroes Award
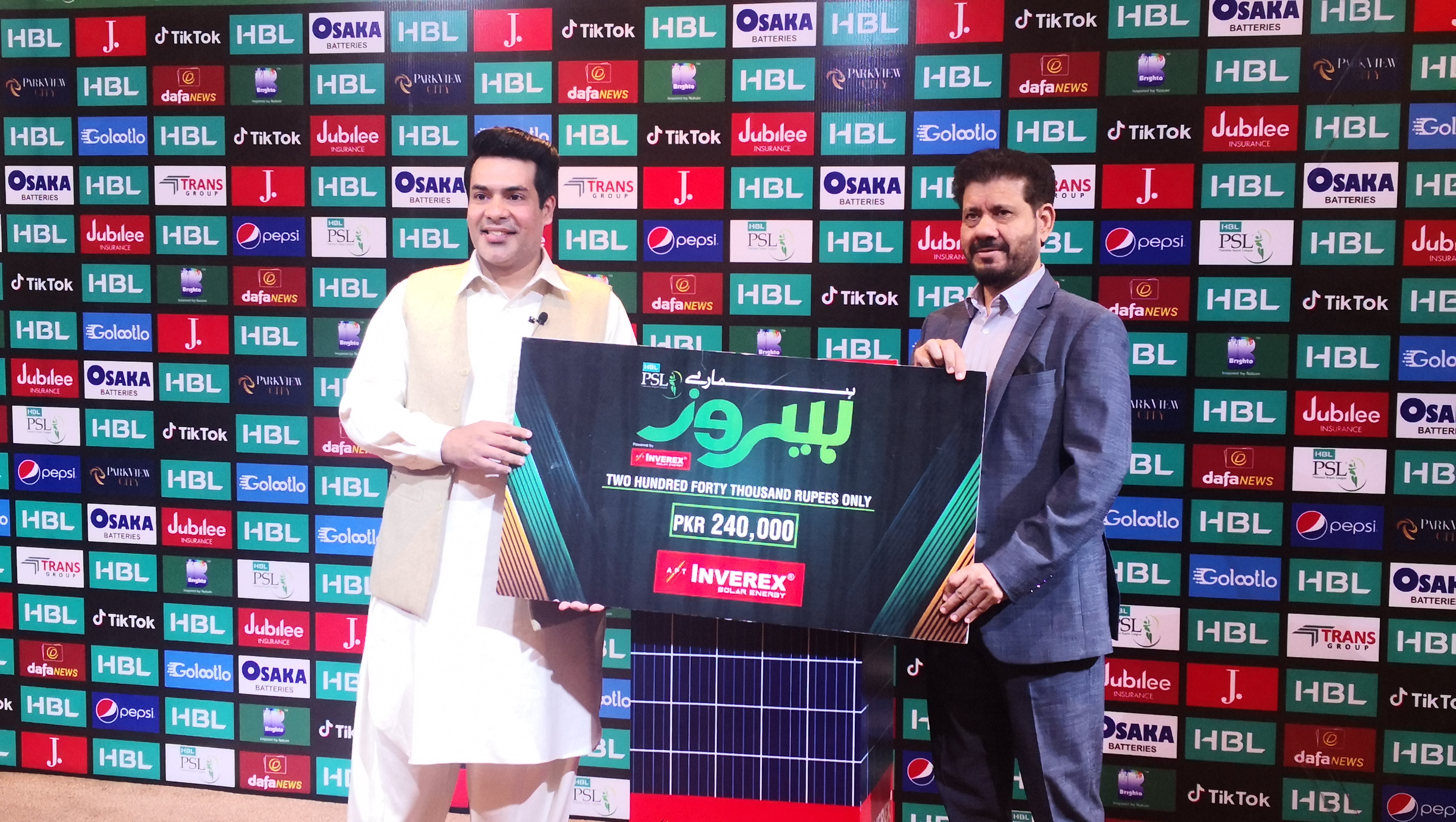
- Award Distribution (2022)
- Countries: Pakistan
- Administrator: Pakistan Cricket Board
- First edition: 2020
- Latest edition: 2026
- Website: www.psl-t20.com/hamaray-heroes/

HBL PSL Hamaray Heroes Award was introduced by Pakistan Cricket Board during the 2020 edition of the Pakistan Super League. According to the criteria of the Hamaray Heroes campaign, online nominations of individuals (with notable achievements) are received from the fans and 34 winners are finally shortlisted by PCB Board of Governors for HBL PSL Hamaray Heroes Award with a cash prize of PKR 240,000.00 every year. Individuals from different walks of life (including sports, education, healthcare, art, culture, music, social work and technology) can be nominated who directly help others, whose work contributes to the wellbeing of others, or whose achievements inspire others. Being the unsung heroes, the selected 34 winners of HBL PSL Hamaray Heroes Award are recognized, celebrated and encouraged throughout the 34 matches of the tournament.

== Recipients ==
Recipients include Hisham Sarwar, Hassan Nisar, Syed Zafar Abbas Jafri and Farhan Wilayat Butt (philanthropists), Ali Sadpara (mountaineer), Ayesha Chundrigar ( Animal Rights Activist), Marvia Malik (Pakistan's first Transgender Newsreader),, Rashid Naseem ( Martial Arts Champion)., Olympic javelin thrower Arshad Nadeem, long-range shooter Mohsin Nawaz, professional e-sports player Arslan Ash, wrestler Muhammad Inam, swimmer Kiran Khan, boxer Muhammad Waseem, and astrophysicist Dr Mariam Sultana.

== See also ==
- Pakistan Cricket Board
- Pakistan Blind Cricket Council
- Pakistan Super League
- Cricket in Pakistan
- Pakistan national cricket team
