= Terrorist incidents in Pakistan in 2018 =

Terrorist incidents in Pakistan in 2018 include:

== January ==
- 15 January - Security personnel were killed when their vehicle was ambushed in Balochistan.
- 16 January - Gunmen killed a police constable in Quetta.
- 16 January - A suicide bomber on a motorcycle in Karachi, aided by gunmen, targeted a senior officer known for leading raids on militant hideouts. The officer survived, and his guards killed two of the gunmen.
- 18 January - Gunmen killed a mother and daughter working on polio vaccination in Quetta.
- 30 January - A bomb explosion in the Upper Kurram Agency killed multiple members of the same family.

== February ==
- 2 February - A suicide bomber injured two guards.
- 3 February - Eleven soldiers of the Pakistan Army were killed from a suicide attack near a military camp in Khyber-Pakhtunkhwa.
- 5 February - Multiple casualties from a bomb that targeted a pro-government leader in Panjgur.
- 5 February - Gunmen attacked two Chinese nationals in Karachi.
- 5 February - Multiple casualties when a vehicle was attacked in North Waziristan.
- 7 February - Multiple casualties from a remote-controlled explosion in Bajaur Agency.
- 14 February - Tehrik-i-Taliban gunmen killed paramilitary soldiers in Quetta.
- 16 February - A leading tribal elder and chief of a local peace committee was killed by a bomb in Bajaur Agency.
- 21 February - A police checkpoint in Peshawar was attacked by people with hand grenades.
- 23 February - The car of a senior government official on Peshawar's Ring Road was targeted with a bomb.
- 28 February - Paramilitary soldiers were killed in a suicide bombing outside Quetta. Elsewhere in Quetta, gunmen killed two guards in a senior police officer's convoy.

== March ==
- 8 March - Two people were shot in Quetta.
- 14 March - Multiple casualties in a suicide bombing at a police checkpoint outside Lahore.
- 17 March - Terrorists killed polio workers and a paramilitary Frontier Corps soldier in Mohmand Agency.
- 24 March - A hand grenade thrown at a spring festival in Dera Ismail Khan injured dozens of people.
- 30 March - An IED killed policemen in the district police officer's convoy in Dera Ismail Khan.
- 31 March - Gunfire during an operation in Balochistan resulted in the death of one soldier and one terrorist.

== April ==
- 1 April - Gunmen attacked a vehicle in Quetta, killing a member of the Shia Hazara community.
- 9 April - A suicide bomber injured multiple people near a Balochistan Frontier Corps vehicle in Quetta.
- 15 April - Christians were shot and killed outside a church in Quetta.
- 18 April - A shopkeeper in the Shia Hazara community was shot and killed in Quetta.
- 22 April - Gunmen on a motorcycle killed Shiites outside Quetta.
- 24 April - Three suicide bombings killed multiple policemen in Quetta.
- 26 April - Multiple people were killed by a hand grenade attack at a wedding in North Waziristan.
- 28 April - Two shopkeepers in the Hazara community were shot and killed in Quetta.

== May ==
- 2 May - A roadside bomb exploded in Safi Tehsil.
- 3 May - A bomb injured three security personnel in Jani Khel.
- 3 May - A vehicle carrying civilian employees of an atomic agency PAEC was attacked in Attock. There were multiple casualties.
- 4 May - Six labourers of Punjabi descent were shot dead in Balochistan.
- 6 May - Ahsan Iqbal, Interior Minister, was shot in the shoulder while getting out of his car to attend a political meeting in Punjab province.
- 11 May - A bomb targeted a police patrol at a bus stop in Bannu.
- 14 May - A Shiite religious scholar was shot by Lashkar-e-Jhangvi terrorists in Khyber Pakhtunkhwa.
- 27 May - Two Policemen and two militants were killed when unidentified militants opened fire on Policemen at Sarki Road in Quetta, Balochistan.

== July ==
- 10 July - A suicide bombing left 20 people dead and 63 others wounded in Peshawar.
- 12 July - a spokesperson for former Member of National Assembly Alhaj Shah Jee Gul Afridi was killed and another citizen was injured after unidentified men opened fire at the spokesperson's car in Peshawar.
- 13 July - Five citizens were killed and 10 were injured after a planted bomb exploded near the car of JUI-F candidate Akram Khan Durrani in Bannu.
- 13 July - A blast killed at least 131 including BAP candidate for Balochistan Assembly, Nawabzada Siraj Raisani and injured one hundred twenty.
- 22 July - A suicide bombing targeting Ikramullah Gandapur left 3 people dead and 3 wounded in Kulachi, Dera Ismail Khan District.
- 24 July - At least three security personnel and a civilian were killed while 13 others sustained injuries after a military convoy on election duty came under attack in Turbat.
- 25 July - A bomb blast killed 31 people during polling in the polling station Quetta.

== August ==
- 4 August - A government girls' school was torched in the Darel tehsil of the Diamer District in Gilgit-Baltistan in Pakistan. In another incident, one policeman was killed and another wounded in a gun battle in the Tangir tehsil of the same district. A militant was also killed in the incident.
- 11 August - A suicide bomber of Balochistan Liberation Army targeted a bus with Chinese engineers in Dalbandin left 6 injured.
- 23 August -One security personnel was killed and an additional 3 were injured in a bomb blast in North Waziristan Pakistan.

== September ==
- 14 September - At least three levies personnel died in a motorcycle bomb blast and another two were injured on the northern by-pass in the Pishin district of Balochistan. Hizbul Ahrar claimed responsibility.
- 25 September - An IED blast in North Waziristan left a soldier dead and another injured. The Jihadi group Hizbul Ahrar claimed responsibility and claimed killing 1 and injuring 4.
- 30 September - A IED went off in the Upper Dir District of the Khyber Pakhtunkhwa province of Pakistan resulting in the death of Pakistani soldier as well as the injury of another one, no group has claimed responsibility yet for this attack.

== October ==
- 2 October - Terrorists opened fire and bombed a convoy killing 3 Pakistani Security personnel and injuring 8 more at the Awaran District of Balochistan, Pakistan. No group has claimed responsibility although Terrorist groups have done similar attacks in that area in the past.
- 8 October - A shooting attack left a policeman dead in Karachi, Pakistan the Hizbul-Ahrar militant group claimed responsibility and claimed injuring 3 policemen more.
- 11 October - A roadside bomb targeted a vehicle belonging to the Pakistani Army in the Ladha Subdivision of South Waziristan Pakistan, resulted in the deaths of three soldiers and five wounded, the Tehrik-i-Taliban Pakistan claimed responsibility for the attack.
- 13 October - Two Oil and gas employees of a company were kidnapped by Hizbul-Ahrar militants in North Waziristan. A search operation by Pakistani security forces was conducted.
- 19 October - Two soldiers of the Frontier Corps (FC) were killed when militants opened fire on them at South Waziristan. The Tehrik-i-Taliban Pakistan claimed responsibility for the attack.
- 22 October - Five people including three minor girls and a mother were injured when a toy bomb they picked up blew up. The attack occurred in the Bannu District in the restive region of Northwest Pakistan.
- 23 October - Three workers of an oil and gas exploration company and a security officer were shot dead by unknown gunmen after being abducted, their vehicle was also set on fire, the attack occurred in the restive region of North Waziristan, Pakistan.
- 24 October - 4 students were injured when several unknown gunmen opened fire outside a school in Quetta, Pakistan.
- 25 October - Balochistan militants attacked a Pakistani military convoy killing 2 in Balochistan's Washuk District.
- 25 October - A policeman in Quetta was killed when assailants opened fire on him in the Barori police station. The Tehrik-i-Taliban Pakistan later claimed responsibility for the attack.
- 29 October - A bomb detonated targeting a vehicle of the security forces in the Bajaur District of North-west Pakistan, 4 security personnel were injured. The Tehrik-i-Taliban Pakistan claimed responsibility for the attack.

== November ==
- 5 November - A security official was killed and another one was injured in a bomb blast in Datta Khel as they were patrolling. Hizbul Ahrar claimed responsibility for the bombing.
- 7 November - A security officer was killed and another four soldiers were wounded when a security officer was trying to defuse a bomb that was placed by militants in Pakistan's Mohmand district. Hizbul Ahrar claimed responsibility.
- 17 November - A former senior police officer was gunned down while walking towards his home by multiple assailants in Quetta. This former senior police officer had also survived other numerous attacks. The Tehrik-i-Taliban later claimed responsibility.
- 18 November - Two soldiers were killed and two others were wounded when militants attacked their vehicle with rockets in the North Waziristan region. Tehrik-i-Taliban later claimed responsibility.
- 22 November - Four people were injured in the Dera Bugti District when their passenger vehicle struck a roadside bomb, no group has claimed responsibility for the blast.
- 23 November
  - Karachi Chinese consulate attack
  - 2018 Orakzai bombing

== December ==
- 2 December - A Pakistani Shia coalmine worker was shot dead while another person was injured by Lashkar-e-Jhangvi terrorists in the Machh town of Pakistan.
- 6 December - Terrorists attacked a security patrol, prompting an exchange of fire in which a terrorist was killed and another one was wounded, while two police officers were also injured in the attack that took place in the Dera Ghazi Khan District.
- 14 December - Six Pakistani security officers were killed and 14 others were injured when terrorists opened fire and bombed a security convoy in the Kech district. A Balochistan separatist group claimed responsibility for the attack, 4 terrorists were later killed by security forces.
- 29 December - Two members of the bomb disposal squad were killed, when they were struck by a bomb in the Mohmand District, another person also suffered injuries, the organization Hizbul Ahrar claimed responsibility.

== See also ==
- 2018 in Pakistan
- Terrorism in Pakistan
- List of terrorist incidents in 2018
