= Karpal Kaur Sandhu =

UK woman police officer

- Born: 1943; Zanzibar
- Died: 4 November 1973 (aged 29–30); Walthamstow
- Cause of death: murdered
- Occupation: Police officer
- Employer: Metropolitan Police Service
- Known for: first female Asian police officer in Britain

Karpal Kaur Sandhu (1943-1973) was the first female Asian police officer in Britain. She served in the Metropolitan Police Service from 1971 to 1973.

== History ==
Sandhu was born in Zanzibar in 1943, before moving to Britain in 1962 and becoming a nurse at Chase Farm Hospital in Enfield. She joined the Metropolitan Police Service aged 27 on 1 February 1971, serving first in Hornsey, then in Walthamstow and Leyton. Her date of joining made her the first female Asian police officer in Britain.

Sandhu died in the line of duty on 4 November 1973. Her husband did not agree with her becoming a police officer, claiming it was neither suitably Asian nor ladylike. Eventually, her husband confronted her outside her house in Chelmsford Road, Walthamstow. When her husband attacked her, she recalled herself to duty in order to arrest him. In March 1974 he was found guilty of her murder and received a life sentence.

== See also ==
- International Association of Women Police
- Kiran Bedi
- Suhai Aziz Talpur
- Women in law enforcement
