= Anwaar ul Haq Kakar =

Caretaker Prime Minister of Pakistan (born 1971)

Senate of Pakistan Anwaar-ul-Haq Kakar
- انوار الحق کاکڑ
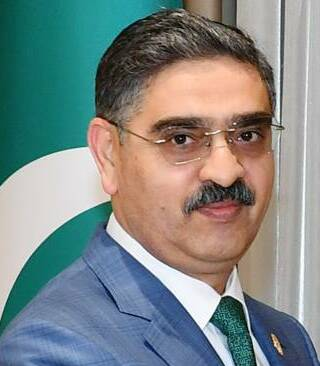
- Kakar in 2023

Prime Minister of Pakistan
- Caretaker; 14 August 2023 – 4 March 2024
- President: Arif Alvi
- Preceded by: Shehbaz Sharif
- Succeeded by: Shehbaz Sharif

Member of the Senate of Pakistan
- Incumbent
- Assumed office 9 April 2024
- Constituency: General seat from Balochistan, Pakistan
- In office 12 March 2018 – 13 August 2023
- Constituency: General seat from Balochistan

Spokesperson of the Government of Balochistan
- In office 2015–2018

Personal details
- Born: 15 May 1971 (age 55) Muslim Bagh, Qilla Saifullah, Balochistan, Pakistan
- Party: PTI (2026–present)
- Other political affiliations: Independent (2023–2026); BAP (2018–2023): PML(N) (2013–2018); PML(Q) (2006–2013)
- Education: Cadet College Kohat; University of Balochistan
- Occupation: Politician; teacher

Anwaar ul-Haq Kakar (Note: Urdu: انوار الحق کاکڑ; Pashto: انوار الحق کاکړ) (born 15 May 1971) is a Pakistani politician who served as the longest-serving caretaker prime minister of Pakistan between 14 August 2023 and 4 March 2024. He was succeeded by his predecessor Shehbaz Sharif. He assumed membership in the Upper House of Pakistan in March 2018. Before taking on the role of caretaker prime minister, Kakar had resigned from the upper house of parliament. Subsequently, he publicly declared his resignation from both the Senate and the Balochistan Awami Party (BAP), a political party he established in 2018.

Kakar also served as the spokesperson of the Government of Balochistan from 2015 to 2017.

== Early life and education ==
Kakar was born on 15 May 1971 in Qilla Saifullah, Balochistan into a prominent middle-class Kakar Pashtun family. His grandfather, Dr Noor Ul Haq Kakar, was the personal physician of the Khan of Kalat, his father Ehtesham ul Haq Kakar was a civil servant, while his maternal uncle Arbab Yousaf Kasi and other relatives have been involved in politics. He lost his mother when he was 4, while his father died when he was 18.

Kakar was educated at St. Francis School, Quetta and later attended Cadet College Kohat. He holds a master's degree in political science and sociology, which he completed at the University of Balochistan in the 1990s. He further attempted to study law at Birkbeck, University of London in the United Kingdom but did not complete the program.

He returned to Pakistan in 2005.

== Academic career ==
Kakar started his career as a teacher.

Kakar is fluent in Pashto, Urdu, Persian, English, Balochi and Brahui.

== Political career ==
While acting as the Balochistan provincial spokesperson, Kakar founded an NGO called Voice of Balochistan (VOB) in 2016 and served as its CEO. The NGO managed a wide array of pro-military social media accounts aimed at refuting reports of human rights violations, enforced disappearances, and purported staged encounters by the armed forces in Balochistan. Despite being established in 2016, VOB was not officially registered until March 2021, according to government records.

=== Senator, 2006–2023 ===
Kakar began his political career when he joined PML-Q in 2006. He contested a seat in the National Assembly from Quetta in the 2008 general election but was unsuccessful.

Kakar supported military actions in Balochistan during the ethnic nationalist insurgency from 2007 to 2013, often dismissing allegations of military abuses in the province and attributing unrest to external factors. In December 2015, his stance led to his appointment as the spokesperson for the Chief Minister of Balochistan during the tenure of the Pakistan Muslim League (N) (PML-N) government, a position he held until 2018.

In 2018, Kakar left PML-N and helped found a new political party named Balochistan Awami Party (BAP). Later, he was elected to the Senate of Pakistan as an independent candidate for a general seat from Balochistan in the 2018 Pakistani Senate election. He took oath as Senator on 12 March 2018. He also remained chairperson for the Committee of Overseas Pakistanis and Human Resource Development and members of other committees including the Business Advisory Committee, Finance and Revenue, Foreign Affairs, Science and Technology.

In 2020, Kakar was briefly considered for the Federal Minister of Information position in Imran Khan's government, but he was ultimately not appointed.

=== Caretaker Prime Minister (2023–2024) ===
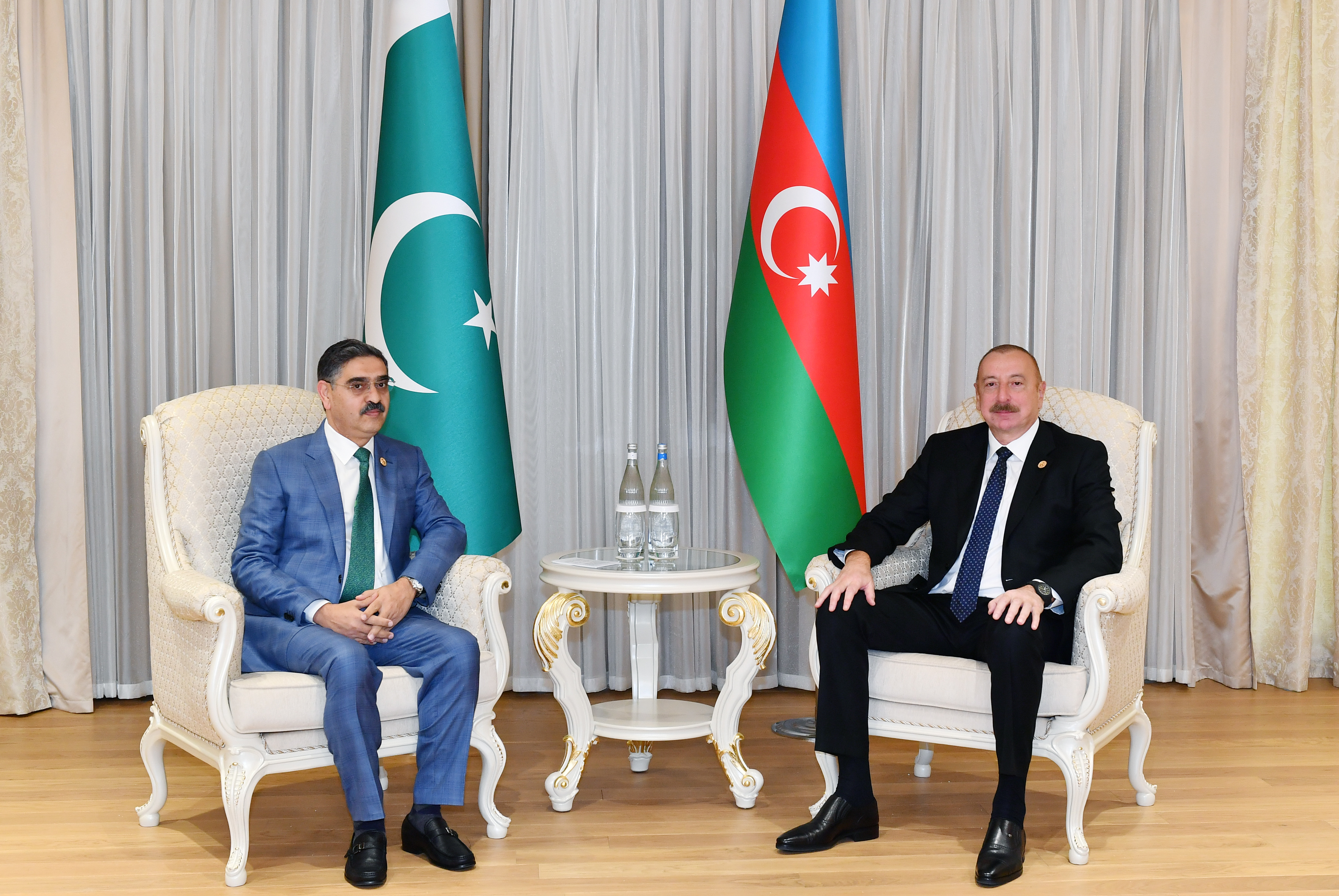
Kakar with Azerbaijan's President Ilham Aliyev in November 2023

In 2023, Kakar was nominated to serve as Caretaker Prime Minister of Pakistan by outgoing Leader of the Opposition Raja Riaz and outgoing Prime Minister Shehbaz Sharif. He was sworn in as caretaker prime minister by President Arif Alvi on 14 August 2023, the 76th independence day of Pakistan. He resigned from the Senate on 14 August 2023, which was accepted by the Chairman of the Senate Sadiq Sanjrani. Kakar's position as caretaker prime minister was given further executive power by previous government legislation, primarily to ensure Kakar was able to smoothly ensure the implementation of major policy decisions.

On 3 October 2023, Pakistan's caretaker government ordered that all undocumented immigrants, particularly the nearly 1.73 million undocumented Afghans, voluntarily leave the country by 1 November 2023 or face deportation in a crackdown. Kakar said that the government's repatriation policy is not exclusive to Afghan nationals, but applies to all illegal immigrants in Pakistan. He stated that despite not being a signatory to the Geneva Convention, Pakistan has hosted over 4 million Afghan refugees for the past 40 years. Taliban authorities condemned the deportations of Afghans as an "inhuman act."

In October 2023, he called for a ceasefire in the Gaza war. In November 2023, Kakar said that "We are witnessing a holocaust of Palestinian children in Gaza. This appalling and atrocious child holocaust must stop immediately."

== Political views ==
=== Foreign policy ===
Kakar's foreign policy is to form the bedrock of Pakistan's partnership with the United States, China and Gulf states as primary geopolitical, geoeconomics allies, especially as security actors.

=== Criticism of terrorism & Baloch separatism ===
In 2018, Kakar and Saeed Ahmed Hashmi along with some dissident Balochistan-based politicians from PML-N and PML-Q founded Balochistan Awami Party.

He is a notable critic of terrorism & Baloch separatism, he claims that because of the separatist propaganda of the Indian agency, Research and Analysis Wing (RAW), in the name of Baloch nationalism has destroyed Balochistan, and that citizens must unite for the peace, stability and progress in the region. He also clarified that thousands of Baloch youth were killed during the past 20 years, adding that only in 2014, 155 innocent Baloch people were killed as they refused to give extortion to the separatist groups.

Under his caretaker tenure, the Baloch separatists of the Baloch Nationalist Army: Sarfraz Bangulzai and Gulzar Imam surrendered to the Government of Balochistan, and were at the forefront of the low-level insurgency in Balochistan for more than two decades. Experts have described their surrender as a significant boost for the government of Pakistan and for the progress of Balochistan.

== Wealth ==
According to Election Commission of Pakistan, before assuming his role as caretaker PM, Kakar declared his net worth at Rs. 48.2 million (US$170,000). Among the mentioned assets are 10 tolas of gold, 50,000 shares in Pakistan Chagai Mining Limited, and 20 acres of inherited agricultural land valued at Rs 8 million. The acting prime minister also has more than Rs 20 million deposited in two different banks.

== Controversies ==
=== Postponing elections ===
Pakistani law requires that elections be held within 90 days of the dissolution of parliament. The main responsibility of the caretaker Prime Minister is to organize the elections, which were supposed to take place by March 2023. Prime Minister Kakar's government controversially delayed the elections due to security concerns and protracted economic turmoil. Furthermore, the 2024 Pakistani general election, held on 8 February, was marred by allegations of vote rigging by the military establishment.

=== Wheat import scandal ===
The Pakistan wheat import scandal refers to a controversy that emerged in 2024, involving the importation of a significant amount of wheat by Kakar's caretaker ministry, despite the country having surplus wheat stocks. This decision allegedly caused a loss of more than 300 billion rupees to the national exchequer.

== Committees ==
Committee Member:	Present Member of Standing Committees: Overseas Pakistanis and Human Resource Development (Chairperson Committee); Business Advisory Committee; Finance and Revenue; Foreign Affairs; Science and Technology

== Notes ==
Political offices
Preceded by Shehbaz Sharif	Prime Minister of Pakistan; Caretaker; 2023–2024	Succeeded by Shehbaz Sharif
