= 2019–2020 wheat flour crisis in Pakistan =

Spike in commodity pricing

Wheat flour crisis in Pakistan started in November 2019 and worsened around mid-January 2020 onwards.

== Background ==
The products made out of wheat flour especially roti are a staple in Pakistani diet. Wheat flour is also used to make naans and other forms of bread in Pakistan. It is estimated that 22 million tons of wheat is consumed in Pakistan annually.

When Pakistan Tehreek-e-Insaf (PTI) took over the helms of governmental affairs in August 2018, the price of the wheat flour was 50 PKR per kilogram (KG).

== Crisis ==
The crisis came to surface with its full-fledged intensity around mid-January 2020 when the Flour Mills Association (FMA) raised the wheat flour price by 6 PKR per KG hitting a total of around 70 PKR per KG. This was an increase of 20 PKR per KG since the inception of PTI government. Hiking up the price, the FMA complained that they did not receive any subsidy from the government while in addition to the price of raw commodity, the gas and electric prices were hiked up as well thus they did not have any other option but to bump up the flour prices.

== Management ==
According to Jehangir Tareen who is affiliated with the government of PTI, the crisis started in November 2019 and the federal government furnished Pakistan Agriculture Storage and Services Cooperation (Passco) with 400,000 tonnes of wheat to counter the crisis.

== Bibliography ==
- Sari Edelstein (2011), Food, Cuisine, and Cultural Competency for Culinary, Hospitality, and Nutrition Professionals, Jones & Bartlett Learning, p. 262, ISBN 978-0-76-375965-0
- Paul Shavelson (5 May 2015), "Africa Forget", Flat Food, Flat Stomach: The Law of Subtraction, Post Hill Press, ISBN 978-1-61-868932-0
