= Asad Shafiq (Pakistani politician) =

Pakistani politician from Gilgit-Baltistan

- اسد شفیق

Member of the Gilgit-Baltistan Assembly
- Incumbent
- Assumed office 22 June 2026
- Preceded by: Muhammad Ismail
- Constituency: GBA-24 Ghanche-III

Personal details
- Party: Pakistan Tehreek-e-Insaf (2026-present)
- Other political affiliations: Independent (2026)
- Parent: Mohammad Shafiq (father)

Asad Shafiq is a Pakistani politician who has served as a member of the Gilgit-Baltistan Assembly since June 2026. He is the son of Mohammad Shafiq, a former member of the Gilgit-Baltistan Assembly, and represents the same seat as his father.

== Political career ==
Shafiq was elected to the Gilgit-Baltistan Assembly from GBA-24 Ghanche-III as an independent candidate in the 2026 Gilgit Baltistan Assembly election. He received 7,763 votes and defeated Muhammad Ismail, a candidate of Pakistan People's Party (PPP). After his election, he joined Istehkam-e-Pakistan Party (IPP).
