= Pakistan wheat import scandal =

2024 political scandal

The Pakistan wheat import scandal refers to a controversy that emerged in 2024, involving the importation of a significant amount of wheat by the caretaker government, despite the country having surplus wheat stocks. This decision allegedly caused a loss of more than 300 billion rupees to the national exchequer. The import of wheat was continued in the first two months of the Shehbaz Sharif government, as 778,000 metric tons worth of wheat, costing $231.32 million continued to be imported.

== Background ==
A summary of one million tonnes of wheat imports for strategic reserves was prepared during the caretaker government. However, in reality 2.778 thousand tons of wheat was ordered. The importation took place from September 2023 to March 2024. The decision to import wheat was taken during the previous caretaker government, and continued after the PML-N government assumed power.

== Impact on farmers ==
Wheat imports led to a glut of wheat in the market, causing prices to fall and farmers to struggle to sell their produce at a reasonable price. Farmers were getting Rs 2,800 to Rs 3,000 for 40 kg of wheat while a support price of Rs 39,005 was promised. Due to this crisis, farmers resorted to protests in Lahore and many other Pakistani cities.

== Nationwide protests ==
In response to the wheat crisis, the Kissan Ittehad Pakistan announced that thousands of farmers would participate in nationwide protests beginning May 10. The protest is aimed at the government's inability to purchase harvested wheat at the announced minimum support price of Rs 3,900 per millet. 40 kg.

== Investigation and accountability ==
An inquiry committee was set up to investigate the scandal and determine responsibility. The committee began interviewing officials to identify those responsible for allowing imports of wheat due to the expected shortage. The preliminary report of the investigation has revealed that federal agencies are responsible for the unnecessary importation of wheat. The complete report was submitted to the government in three days.

Shehbaz Sharif directed the suspension of the Pakistan Agricultural Storage and Services Corporation (PASCO) Managing Director (MD) and General Manager (GM) Procurement due to "negligence and non-compliance with the PM’s instructions regarding the use of technology in the wheat procurement process," ordering third party audit of PASCO stock and additional procurement of 0.4 million metric tons (MMT) of wheat "transparently and efficiently." Shehbaz also suspended Secretary Food Security Muhammad Asif and appointed Muhammad Fakhar-e-Alam in his place.

== Reactions ==
- Pakistan Tehreek-e-Insaf (PTI) has demanded the formation of a judicial commission to investigate the wheat scandal. He alleged that the federal government's inquiry committee appeared to be an attempt to protect the big players involved in the scam.
- Pakistan Peoples Party (PPP) Secretary General, Syed Nayyer Hussain Bukhari called for a NAB investigation on the scandal, stating "The national treasury has incurred billions of rupees in losses due to the import of wheat, while farmers are on the streets despite bumper wheat production."
- Pakistan Muslim League (N) Leader Nawaz Sharif summoned Shehbaz Sharif to Jati Umra to discuss the wheat scandal. In another meeting at Model Town he said that those involved in the "wheat import scam should be taken to task," and supported accountability. Nawaz Sharif was given a briefing that said that claimed the Caretaker government was responsible for the wheat crisis. The current Punjab government also blamed the wheat import scandal on the previous care-taker administration.
- Jamaat-i-Islami (JI) Party Emir Hafiz Naeem ur Rehman on May 2 warned that his party would stage protests if the government "persisted with its anti-farmer stance," called for the establishment of a judicial commission to investigate the scandal, urged the JI Kissan (farmer) chapter to liaise with farmer organizations and advocated for land reforms to distribute land among small farmers.
- Federation of Pakistan Chambers of Commerce and Industry (FPCCI) Standing Committee on Agriculture on March 8 said that PASCO was operating in contradiction of the Prime Minister's directives through stopping wheat procurement and urged a third-party audit. Chaudhry Ahmad Jawad of the FPCCI further questioned the reason for importing wheat, the reducing of the procurement target, the delay in procuring, the sudden switch from written to online procedure and treatment of protesting farmers.
