= GBA-24 Ghanche-III =

Constituency for the Gilgit Baltistan Assembly

- Constituency for the Provincial Assembly of the Gilgit-Baltistan
- Region: Ghanche District
- Electorate: 20,180

Current constituency
- Created: 2009
- Party: Istehkam-e-Pakistan Party
- Member: Asad Shafiq

GBA-24 Ghanche-III is a constituency of Gilgit Baltistan Legislative Assembly which is currently represented by Asad Shafiq of Istehkam-e-Pakistan Party.

== Members ==
Election	Member	Party
1994	Muhammad Ismail	PPP
1999	Muhammad Ismail	PPP
2004	Muhammad Ismail	PPP
2009	Muhammad Ismail	PPP
2015	Mohammad Shafiq	PML(N)
June 2020	Muhammad Ismail (Note: Ismail was notified on 4 June 2020 as the winner of the 2015 election. Since the Assembly was dissolved on 23 June 2020, he was never sworn in.)	PPP
2020	Muhammad Ismail	PPP
2026	Asad Shafiq (Note: Asad Shafiq was elected as an independent, but later joined IPP.)	IPP

== Election results ==
=== 1994 ===
Muhammad Ismail Independent became a member of the Northern Areas Legislative Council by getting 3,770 votes.

=== 1999 ===
Muhammad Ismail of Pakistan Peoples Party became a member of the Northern Areas Legislative Council by getting 4,030 votes.

=== 2004 ===
Muhammad Ismail of Pakistan Peoples Party became a member of the Northern Areas Legislative Council by getting 4,340 votes.

=== 2009 ===
Muhammad Ismail of Pakistan Peoples Party became a member of the Gilgit-Baltistan Assembly by getting 4,770 votes.

=== 2015 ===
Mohammad Shafiq of Pakistan Muslim League (N) won this seat by getting 5,226 votes.

2015: Ghanche-III
Party	Candidate	Votes	%
PML-N	Mohammad Shafiq	5,226	45.98
PPP	Mohammad Ismail	5,193	45.69
MWM	Muhammad Ishaq Saqib	948	8.33
Turnout		11,367	67.45
PML(N) gain from PPP		Swing	

Shafiq died on 5 February 2020. On 4 June 2020, the Election Commission Gilgit-Baltistan notified Ismail as the returned candidate and posthumously de-notified Shafiq. As the assembly was dissolved nineteen days later, Ismail was never sworn in as a member.

=== 2020 ===
Mohammad Ismail of Pakistan Peoples Party won this seat by getting 6,239 votes.

2020: Ghanche-III
Party	Candidate	Votes	%
PPP	Mohammad Ismail	6,239	49.45
PTI	Syed Shams ud Din	5,666	44.91
PML	Muhammad Ibrahim	403	1.3
PML(N)	Manzoor Hussain	305	1.0
Turnout		12,732	70.45
PPP gain from PML(N)		Swing	

=== 2026 ===
General elections were held on 7 June 2026. Asad Shafiq, an independent candidate, won the election with 7,763 votes. He later joined Istehkam-e-Pakistan Party (IPP).

Election 2026: GBA-24 Ghanche-III
Party	Candidate	Votes	%	±%
Independent	Asad Shafiq	7,763	50.51	
PPP	Muhammad Ismail	5,311	34.56	
PTI	Sadaqat Hussain (Note: PTI members who contested in the general election ran as independent candidates aligned with the party because the Election Commission Gilgit-Baltistan prohibited the PTI election symbol.)	1,960	12.75	
Others	Others (three candidates)	335	2.18	
Valid ballots		15,369	98.52	
Rejected ballots		231	1.48	
Turnout		15,600	62.03	
Majority		2,452	15.95	
Registered electors		25,148		
Independent gain from PPP				
