= 2018 Quetta suicide bombing =

Terrorist attack in Quetta, Pakistan

- Part of War in North-West Pakistan
- Quetta (Balochistan, Pakistan) Quetta (Pakistan)
- Location: Quetta, Balochistan, Pakistan
- Date: 25 July 2018 (PST)
- Attack type: Suicide bombing
- Deaths: 31
- Injuries: 40
- Perpetrator: Islamic State of Iraq and the Levant
- No. of participants: 1 suicide bomber
- Motive: Derailment of 2018 Pakistani general election

On 25 July 2018, during polling for the 2018 Pakistani general election, a bomb blast outside a polling station in Quetta's Eastern Bypass area resulted in 31 people being killed and over 35 injured. Islamic State of Iraq and the Levant claimed responsibility for the attack, according to the group’s Amaq News Agency.

== Attack ==
"The bomber was trying to enter the polling station. When police tried to stop him, he blew himself," a local administration official in Quetta, Hashim Ghilzai, has said. According to Bomb Disposal Squad, 18-20 kilograms of explosives were used in the suicide attack.

== Responsibility ==
Islamic State of Iraq and the Levant claimed responsibility for the attack, according to the group’s Amaq news agency. The group said the attack was carried out by a suicide bomber, but did not provide further detail or evidence for its claim.

== Aftermath ==
Election Commission of Pakistan (ECP) while condemning the attack had summoned report from Balochistan government. ECP also suspended the internet and cellphone services in several districts in Balochistan. Polling resumed in the PB-31 polling station after being suspended briefly, however, the number of voters remained low.

== Reactions ==
- Chairman of Pakistan Tehreek-e-Insaf Imran Khan condemned the attack and called it a “terrorist attack” by Pakistan’s enemies “seeking to disrupt our democratic process”. He tweeted, "Condemnable terrorist attack in Quetta by enemies of Pak seeking to disrupt our democratic process. Saddened by the loss of innocent lives. Pakistanis must defeat the terrorists' design by coming out in strength to cast their vote."
- President of Pakistan Muslim League (N) Shehbaz Sharif also condemned the incident as a “terrorist attack” and offered his condolences to the families of the victims. He tweeted, "Heart broken to learn of martyrdom of innocent people including police officials & injuries sustained by others in a terrorist attack in Quetta at a time when the people are exercising their democratic right of vote. My profound condolences to the bereaved families."

== See also ==
- List of terrorist incidents linked to Islamic State – Khorasan Province

Terrorist incidents in Pakistan in 2018

- Pakistani general election, 2018 violence
- Quetta attacks
