= Mohsin Nawaz =

Pakistani long-range shooter

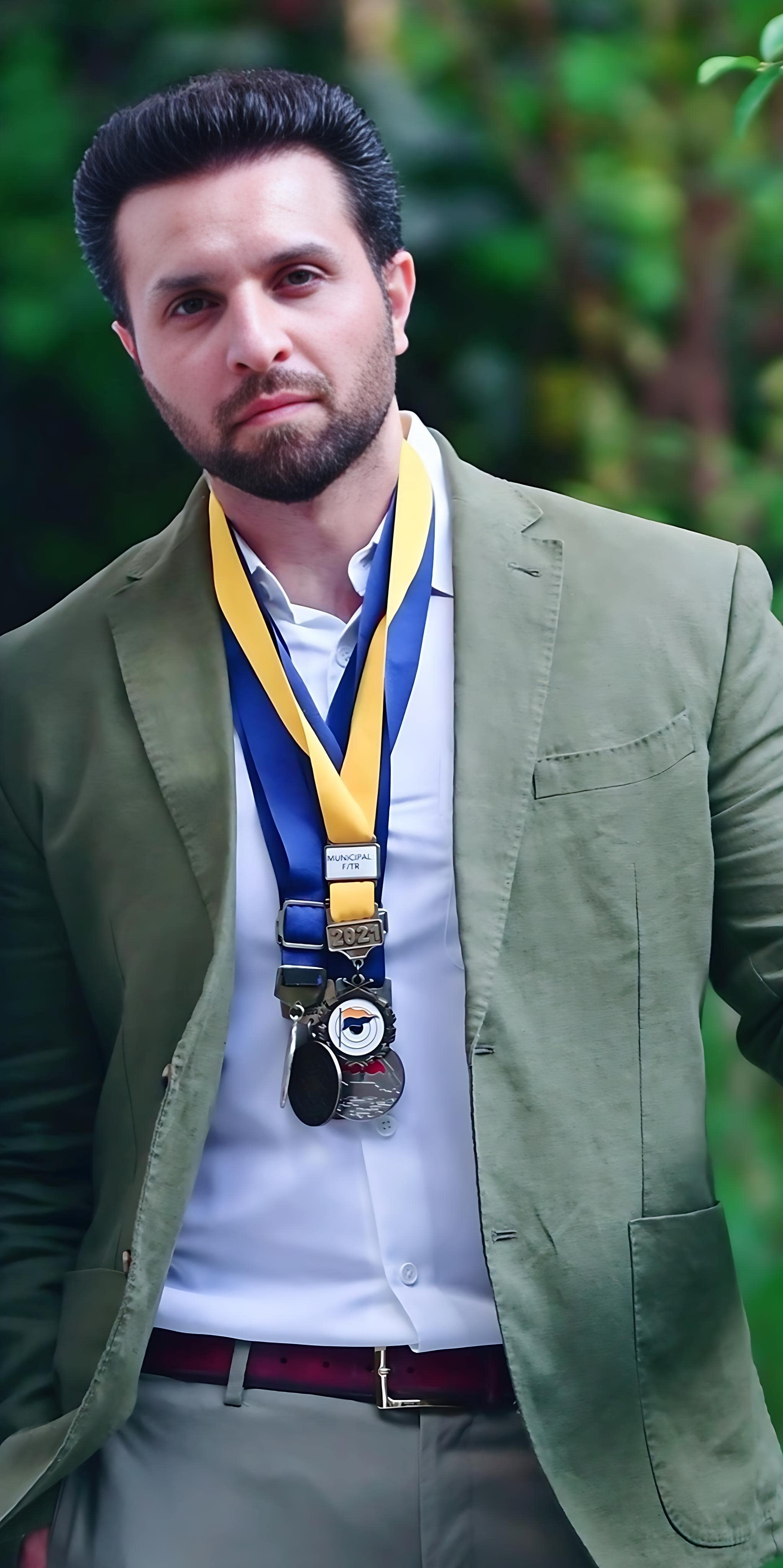
- Born: August 23, 1983 (age 42); Faisalabad, Pakistan
- Citizenship: Pakistani
- Occupations: Sports shooter Sports psychologist Nutritionist
- Years active: 2004–present
- Awards: Tamgha-e-Imtiaz (2026)
- Website: mohsinnawaz.com

Mohsin Nawaz (born August 23, 1983) is a Pakistani long range shooter, sports psychologist, and nutritionist. He represents Pakistan in long range shooting sports internationally.

Mohsin is the first long-range shooter since 1958 to receive the prestigious Tamgha-e-Imtiaz and the only Pakistani to have won 10 F-class long-range shooting medals in international competitions.

== Early life and career ==
Mohsin Nawaz was born on August 23, 1983 in Faisalabad, Pakistan. He began his career in 2004 by joining the Pakistan Ordnance Factory shooting club in Wah Cantonment.

In 2007, Mohsin won bronze medals in both the 300 meters and 300 meters Iron Sight categories at the 27th PARA Army Shooting Championship. In 2015, he earned bronze medals at the POF Shooting Championship and the All-Pakistan Long Range Shooting Championship.

At the 35th PARA Army Shooting Championship in 2016, Mohsin obtained a gold medal in the 300 meters event and a silver medal in the 800 meters event. He also secured a bronze medal in the 800 meters category at the All-Pakistan Long Range Chandio Cup that same year.

In 2017, Mohsin won a silver medal in the 300 meters Telescope category and a bronze medal in the 300 meters Iron Sight category at the NAVY Shooting Championship. In 2018, he achieved gold medals in the 1000 meters Mehran Cup at the All-Pakistan Long Range Shooting Championship and in the 800 meters category at the All-Pakistan Chandio Cup.

In 2019, Mohsin earned a gold medal in the 300 meters event at the 39th PARA Army Shooting Championship and two gold medals in the 300 meters Benchrest and 1000 meters categories at the 2nd Muhammad Ali Jinnah All Pakistan Shooting Championship. He also won a silver medal in the 1000 meters F-Open category at the CIHPRS Shooting Championship in Indianapolis, Indiana.

In 2021, Mohsin won a bronze medal in the 300 meters event at the 40th PARA Army Shooting Championship and a bronze medal in the 900 meters category at the South Africa Long Range Open Championship. In 2022, he won a gold medal in the 800 meters event at the 42nd PARA Central Meet Open National Challenge Rifle Match, secured three gold and two silver medals at the 68th Western Bisley Long Range Championship, and set a new national record in the F Open Rifle Match.

In 2023, Mohsin won a silver medal in the 800 yards category at the European Long Range Shooting Championship.

In 2024, Mohsin won a silver medal in the 300 yards category at the F Class Imperial Championship, a silver medal in the day one aggregate, and a bronze medal in the one thousand yards competition at the European Championship. In February 2024, he became the brand ambassador of Kahles Scope. Also, in February 2024, Mohsin won a bronze medal in the 800-yards event at the sixth Muhammad Ali Jinnah/The Chief of Army Staff Long Range Shooting Championship. In November 2024, Mohsin earned a bronze medal in the 200-meter .22 F-Class rifle individual event at the 2nd F-Class National Long Range Shooting Championship. Also, in 2024, at the NRA UK Imperial Championship, he won a silver medal in the Donegall 300 match and was placed in the top eight overall.

In November 2025, Mohsin secured a gold medal in the 200-meter .22 ELR Long-Range F-Class competition at the 3rd F-Class Long Range National Championship with a record-breaking score of 144 points, followed by another record in the FTR 300-meter category with a score of 50.9 V-bulls.

== Awards and recognition ==
In August 2025, Mohsin was included on the list of recipients of the Tamgha-e-Imtiaz for 2026. He received the award from the President of Pakistan Asif Ali Zardari on 13 May 2026.

In May 2026, Mohsin was honored with the Hamaray Heroes Award during the 2026 Pakistan Super League final ceremony at Gaddafi Stadium in Lahore.
