= Muhammad Ismail (Pakistani politician) =

Pakistani politician from Gilgit-Baltistan

- محمد اسماعیل

Member of the Gilgit Baltistan Assembly
- In office 25 November 2020 – 24 November 2025
- Preceded by: Mohammad Shafiq
- Succeeded by: Asad Shafiq (Pakistani politician)
- Constituency: GBA-24 Ghanche-III
- In office 10 December 2009 – 9 December 2014
- Succeeded by: Mohammad Shafiq
- Constituency: GBA-24 Ghanche-III

Member of the Northern Areas Legislative Council
- In office 2004–2009
- Preceded by: Mohammad Shafiq
- Constituency: NA-24 Ghanche-III

Minister for Finance, Gilgit-Baltistan
- In office 18 July 2023 – 24 November 2025
- Chief Minister: Gulbar Khan
- Preceded by: Javed Ali Manwa

Minister for Local Government and Census, Gilgit-Baltistan
- In office 24 April 2010 – 9 December 2014
- Chief Minister: Syed Mehdi Shah

Personal details
- Party: PPP (1994-present)

Muhammad Ismail is a Pakistani politician who had been a member of the Gilgit Baltistan Assembly from November 2020 to November 2025, from .

== Early life ==
Muhammad Ismail hails from Saltoro Siachen valley, Gilgit Baltistan. He got his Engineering degree in mechanical engineering from University of Engineering and Technology Lahore in 1992.

== Political career ==
Ismail was elected to the Northern Areas Legislative Council (NALC) in the 1999 elections.

He was re-elected to the NALC from Ghanche as a candidate of Pakistan People's Party (PPP) in the 2004 elections, defeating Mohammad Shafiq.

He was elected to the Gilgit-Baltistan Assembly from GBA-24 Ghanche-III as a candidate of PPP in the 2009 Gilgit-Baltistan Assembly election. He received 5,738 votes and defeated Mohammad Shafiq, a candidate of Pakistan Muslim League (N) (PML(N)).

He was sworn into the cabinet of Chief Minister Syed Mehdi Shah as the Minister for Local Government and Census. He served in this position until the end of the assembly's term on 9 December 2014.

He contested the 2015 Gilgit-Baltistan Assembly election from GBA-24 Ghanche-III as a candidate of PPP, but was unsuccessful. He received 5,193 votes and was defeated by Mohammad Shafiq, a candidate of PML(N).

On 4 June 2020, he was notified by the Election Commission Gilgit-Baltistan as the returned candidate from GBA-24 Ghanche-III, and Shafiq, who had passed away by then, was de-notified. This was due to a judgement by an election tribunal on 30 March 2020 and an order by the Gilgit-Baltistan Chief Court on 28 May 2020. Since the Assembly was dissolved nineteen days later, Ismail was never sworn in.

He was re-elected to the Gilgit-Baltistan Assembly from GBA-24 Ghanche-III as a candidate of PPP in the 2020 Gilgit-Baltistan Assembly election. He received 6,239 votes and defeated Syed Shamsuddin, a candidate of Pakistan Tehreek-e-Insaf (PTI).

On 18 July 2023, he was sworn into the cabinet of Chief Minister Gulbar Khan as the Senior Minister for Finance. He remained in this position until the end of the assembly's term on 24 November 2025.

He contested the 2026 Gilgit Baltistan Assembly election from GBA-24 Ghanche-III as a candidate of PPP, but was unsuccessful. He received 5,311 votes and was defeated by Asad Shafeeq, an independent candidate.

Currently Engineer Ismail also holds the position of provincial General Secretary of Pakistan People party.
