= Malik Mazhar Abbas Raan =

Pakistani politician (1953–2019)

Member of the Provincial Assembly of the Punjab
- In office 29 May 2013 – 31 May 2018

Personal details
- Born: 1 February 1953 Multan, Pakistan
- Died: 16 January 2019 (aged 65) Lahore, Pakistan
- Party: Pakistan Tehreek-e-Insaf

Punjab Assembly Lahore

Malik Mazhar Abbas Raan (1 February 1953 – 16 January 2019) was a Pakistani politician who was a Member of the Provincial Assembly of the Punjab from 1997 to 1999, from May 2013 to May 2018 and again from July 2018 to January 2019.

== Early life and education ==
He was born on 1 February 1953 in Multan.

He graduated from Government Emerson College in 1978 and has the degree of Bachelor of Arts.

== Political career ==
He ran for the seat of the Provincial Assembly of the Punjab as a candidate of Pakistan Peoples Party (PPP) from Constituency PP-166 (Multan-VII) in the 1988 Pakistani general election, but was unsuccessful. He received 21,059 votes and lost the seat to Shah Mehmood Qureshi.

He ran for the seat of the Provincial Assembly of the Punjab as a candidate of Pakistan Democratic Alliance (PDA) from Constituency PP-166 (Multan-VII) in the 1990 Pakistani general election, but was unsuccessful. He received 22,719 votes and lost the seat to Shah Mehmood Qureshi.

He was elected to the Provincial Assembly of the Punjab as a candidate of Pakistan Muslim League (N) (PML-N) from Constituency PP-166 (Multan-VII) in the 1997 Pakistani general election. He received 22,193 votes and defeated Sajjad Hussain Qureshi.

He ran for the seat of the Provincial Assembly of the Punjab as a candidate of PML-N from Constituency PP-201 (Multan-VIII) in the 2002 Pakistani general election, but was unsuccessful. He received 25,005 votes and lost the seat to Malik Muhammad Arshad Ran, a candidate of PPP.

He ran for the seat of the Provincial Assembly of the Punjab as a candidate of Pakistan Muslim League (Q) (PML-Q) from Constituency PP-201 (Multan-VIII) in the 2008 Pakistani general election, but was unsuccessful. He received 25,412 votes and lost the seat to Malik Muhammad Abbas Raan, a candidate of PPP.

He was re-elected to the Provincial Assembly of the Punjab as a candidate of PML-N from Constituency PP-201 (Multan-VIII) in the 2013 Pakistani general election. He received 35,233 votes and defeated Makhdoom Mureed Hussain Qureshi, a candidate of PPP.

He was re-elected to Provincial Assembly of the Punjab as a candidate of Pakistan Tehreek-e-Insaf (PTI) from Constituency PP-218 (Multan-VIII) in the 2018 Pakistani general election.

He died on 16 January 2019 of cardiac arrest in Lahore.
