= 2013 Pakistan election day bombings =

Terrorist incident in Pakistan

- Location: Pakistan
- Date: 11 May 2013
- Attack type: Bombing
- Deaths: 20
- Injuries: 20

On 11 May 2013, the election day for Pakistan general election several bombings took place across the country. The bombings were targeted against offices of the Awami National Party. Another blast was in Quaidabad near a polling station. The blast killed over 10 people.
