= Sardar Ahmed Ali Khan Pitafi =

Pakistani politician

Personal details
- Party: Pakistan Peoples Party
- Education: University of Sindh
- Profession: Politician

Sardar Ahmed Ali Khan Pitafi (30 May 1942 – 5 January 2018) was a Pakistani politician and a member of Pakistan Peoples Party. He served as a member of Provincial Assembly of Sindh between 1988 and 1990, 1993–96, 2008–13 and 2013–18.

He completed his graduation from University of Sindh.

On 5 January 2018, he died at the Ziadin Postgraduate Medical Centre in Karachi, aged 74.
