= Arshad Malik =

Air Marshal (Retired)

Arshad Mahmood Malik is a retired three-star officer in the Pakistan Air Force who was the CEO of Pakistan International Airlines from 2019 to 2022.

== Career in Pakistan Air Force ==
Before joining PIA, Malik was the Vice Chief of Air Staff (VCAS), of Pakistan Air Force (PAF).

During his career in PAF, he flew various trainer and fighter aircraft; and, commanded a fighter squadron, a flying wing, an operational air base and a regional air command.

He has also overseen and coordinated the development and manufacturing of JF-17 Thunder fighter aircraft, induction of transport aircraft like IL-78 and C-130. He has led sale of JF-17 Thunder aircraft and Super Mashak aircraft. Malik has been chairman of Pakistan Aeronautical Complex, Kamra.

His staff appointments include Personal Staff Officer to Chief of the Air Staff, Director Operations Project, Director Operational Requirement and Development, Assistant Chief of Air Staff (OR&D), Chief Project Director JF-17, Deputy Chief of the Air Staff (Personnel) at Air Headquarters and Vice Chief of the Air Staff.

He is a graduate of Combat Commanders’ School, Air War College, National Defence University and Air Command and Staff College, United States of America.

== Career in Pakistan International Airlines ==
Malik was a nominated Director since October 17, 2018. He was elected as acting CEO on October 26, 2018 and was appointed regular CEO w.e.f. April 26, 2019 as per PSC Guidelines 2015.

Malik was ex-officio Chairman of PIA subsidiaries viz PIA Investments Ltd, Skyrooms (Pvt.) Ltd and he was also the Chairman Al-Shifa Trust – the flagship CSR setup of PIACL.

He was Member of Board Finance Committee, Board HR & Compensation Committee, Board Procurement Committee as well as Board COE Committee. Air Marshal Malik was Member CAA Board.

== Awards and recognitions ==
He has been awarded:

- Hilal-i-Imtiaz (Military)
- Sitara-i-Imtiaz (Military)
- Tamgha-e-Imtiaz (Military)
