= Suhai Aziz Talpur =

Pakistani police officer (born 1988)

- سُهائي عزيز ٽالپر
- Born: 1988 (age 37–38); Tando Muhammad Khan District, Sindh, Pakistan
- Education: Zubaida Girls College, Hyderabad
- Police career
- Country: Pakistan
- Department: Sindh Police
- Service years: 2013–present
- Rank: Senior Superintendent of Police (SSP)

Suhai Aziz Talpur (Sindhi: سُهائي عزيز ٽالپر; born 1988) is a Pakistani law enforcement officer, serving as Assistant Superintendent of Police (ASP) since 2013, the third Sindhi woman to serve in the police force of the country in that position. Talpur was praised for her leadership role in foiling the November 2018 terrorist attack against the Chinese consulate in Karachi.

== Early life ==
Suhai Aziz Talpur was born in 1988 in the Bhai Khan Talpur village of the Tando Muhammad Khan District, Sindh, Pakistan. Her father is Aziz Talpur, a political activist and writer.

== Education ==
Talpur graduated from the Fauji Foundation Higher Secondary School, and then joined the Bahria Foundation College, in Hyderabad. She obtained her Bachelor's degree from the Zubaida Girls College and her Master's in Economics from the University of Sindh, Jamshoro. She undertook certificate courses in Chartered Accountancy at the Al-Hamd Academy, Hyderabad, and the Skans School of Accountancy.

When her parents enrolled her at school, most of their relatives started "taunting" the family. They eventually left the village and moved to a nearby town.

== Career ==
Talpur is the first female from the Lowland plateau of Sindh to reach the rank of ASP in the Pakistan Police Services.

On 13 August 2013, an attack with explosives, claimed by a banned nationalist outfit, took place at Hyder Chowk Hyderabad, killing one person. Thirty-five locations within the city were declared "sensitive" and some seventy-five checking points were set up, manned by the police, including police commandos, and Pakistan Rangers paramilitaries, while the police intensified patrols in all Hyderabad. ASP Suhai Talpur was appointed in charge of Police Headquarters and related security arrangements, until the end of Independence Day celebrations.

In 2017, she was placed in charge of the investigation at Sindh Varsity Common after allegations of sexual harassment were submitted by girl students against teaching staff.

In 2018, she announced police raids in areas of Jamshoro against organized gangs involved in theft and drug trade, and she stated that there would be "no leniency" for criminals in "a city of education."

== 2018 Karachi Chinese consulate attack ==
On 23 November 2018, three armed separatists who oppose Chinese investment in Pakistan killed two Pakistani policemen guarding the consulate of China in Karachi. The attackers then tried to enter the building using explosives

Talpur, as senior superintendent of the Karachi Police, led police units to the scene, as well as the bomb disposal squad and firemen. She was the first senior officer to reach the scene. She organized and led the two-hour battle that followed, in which all three attackers were killed.

According to Reuters, her actions during the assault on the diplomatic mission were praised "for saving countless lives." A photograph of her carrying a pistol and surrounded by commandos attracted much attention on social media in Pakistan and China. She was also nominated for Pakistan's Tamgha-e-Quaid-e-Azam medal, the first woman to receive this nomination.

== Wider significance ==
Suhai Talpur's entrance in the Pakistani police force and subsequent rise in its hierarchy are considered as important events in a culture where woman police officers are rare. Before her, only two women from Sindh had been accepted in the police.

== See also ==
- Conservatism in Pakistan
- Alice Stebbins Wells
- Pushpa Kumari Kohli
