= Killing of Hayat Baloch =

2020 killing in Balochistan, Pakistan

- Location: Absor Turbat, Balochistan, Pakistan
- Date: 13 August 2020
- Target: Hayat Baloch
- Attack type: Extrajudicial killing
- Deaths: Hayat Baloch
- Injuries: 3 FC servicemen
- Perpetrators: Shadiullah, a Frontier Corps serviceman
- Motive: Suspected involvement in a bomb blast
- Verdict: Death penalty for Shadiullah

Hayat Baloch was a BS Physiology student at University of Karachi from Balochistan. He was killed on 13 August 2020 by a serviceman of Frontier Corps (FC), a paramilitary force in Pakistan, in Absor Turbat after a bomb blast.

The accused serviceman was identified to be Shadiullah and was arrested on 20 August 2020. The accused later confessed to his crimes and was awarded death penalty by a local court in Turbat District on 20 January 2021. Hayat's family expressed satisfaction over the verdict issued by the court.

== Incident ==
On August 13, an FC vehicles was targeted by an improvised explosive device at Balochi Bazaar on Absar Road, injuring three FC serviceman. Following the explosion, security personnel launched search operation in the area. During the operation one of the FC serviceman named Shadiullah caught Hayat Baloch and killed him after tying his hands to his back. Hayat was working in the garden which was close to the site of explosion. So the FC serviceman suspected that Hayat was responsible for the attack on their vehicle.

Following the incident, other FC serviceman in the area overpowered Shadiullah and disarmed him immediately.

== Reaction ==
Federal Minister for Human Rights Shireen Mazari issued a statement in the National Assembly of Pakistan and condemned the incident.

Inspector General of FC South went to the house of the deceased to express grief over the incident.

== Response ==
On 20 August 2020, the FC serviceman responsible for killing Hayat was arrested. The accused FC serviceman later confessed to his crime and was awarded death penalty on 21 January 2021 by a local court in Turbat District.

Hayat's family expressed satisfaction over the verdict. Hayat's uncle, Hakeem Baloch, said that he was quite satisfied with the verdict and that the court has provided them with justice.
