= 2020 Neelum Valley avalanche =

Disaster in Azad Kashmir, Pakistan

- Date: 16 January 2020
- Location: Neelum Valley, Azad Kashmir, Pakistan
- Cause: Avalanche
- Deaths: At least 74
- Injuries: several

In January 2020, at least 74 people were killed and several others were injured in Neelum Valley, Azad Kashmir, Pakistan, after a series of avalanches triggered by heavy snowfall destroyed and buried houses.

A state of emergency was declared in the affected areas, with Pakistan Army helicopters flying search and rescue missions for three days. According to Deputy Commissioner of Neelum, Raja Mahmood Shahid, at least 84 houses and 17 shops were destroyed by the avalanches. A mosque and 94 houses were partially damaged besides the damage to 19 vehicles, including 10 motorbikes. Then Prime Minister Imran Khan visited the victims at the Combined Military Hospital in Muzaffarabad.
