= Mohammad Shafiq (politician) =

Pakistan politician (died 2020)

- محمد شفیق

Member of the Gilgit-Baltistan Assembly
- In office 2015 – 5 February 2020
- Constituency: GBA-24 Ghanche-III

Personal details
- Died: 5 February 2020 Islamabad, Pakistan
- Party: Pakistan Muslim League (N)
- Children: Asad Shafiq (son)

Mohammad Shafiq (died 5 February 2020) was a Pakistani politician from Gilgit-Baltistan belonging to Pakistan Muslim League (N). He was a member of the Gilgit-Baltistan Assembly. He was a minister of the Government of Gilgit-Baltistan too.

== Political career ==
He contested the 2004 Northern Areas Legislative Council election from NA-24 Ghanche-III as a candidate of Pakistan Muslim League (Q), but was unsuccessful. He was defeated by Muhammad Ismail, a candidate of Pakistan People's Party (PPP).

He contested the 2009 Gilgit-Baltistan Assembly election from GBA-24 Ghanche-III as a candidate of Pakistan Muslim League (N) (PML(N)), but was unsuccessful. He received 4,067 votes and was defeated by Muhammad Ismail, a candidate of PPP.

He was elected as a member of the Gilgit-Baltistan Legislative Assembly from GBA-24 Ghanche-III in the 2015 Gilgit-Baltistan Assembly election. He received 5,226 votes and defeated Muhammad Ismail, a candidate of PPP. Ismail challenged these results and on 4 June 2020, the Election Commission Gilgit-Baltistan (ECGB) posthumously de-notified Shafiq. This was due to a judgement by an election tribunal on 30 March 2020 and an order by the Gilgit-Baltistan Chief Court on 28 May 2020.

He served as the Minister for Mines and Minerals, Industries, Labour & Commerce and Food of the Government of Gilgit-Baltistan.

== Death ==
Shafiq died of cardiac arrest in Islamabad on 5 February 2020.
