= Shahnaz Ansari =

Pakistani politician (1970–2020)

Member of the Provincial Assembly of Sindh
- In office June 2013 – 15 February 2020
- Constituency: Reserved seat for women

Personal details
- Born: 10 January 1970 Naushahro Feroze
- Died: 15 February 2020 (aged 50) Naushahro Feroze District
- Manner of death: Assassination
- Party: Pakistan Peoples Party

Shahnaz Ansari (10 January 1970 – 15 February 2020) was a Pakistani politician who was a Member of the Provincial Assembly of Sindh from June 2013 until her assassination.

== Early life and education ==
She was born on 10 January 1970 in Naushahro Feroze. She earned the degree of Bachelor of Arts from the Shah Abdul Latif University.

== Political career ==
She was elected to the Provincial Assembly of Sindh as a candidate of the Pakistan Peoples Party (PPP) on a reserved seat for women in the 2013 Pakistani general election, and re-elected in the 2018 general election.

== Death ==
On 15 February 2020, while Ansari was in Dil Murad Khokhar village, Naushehro Feroze District, she was attacked and received six bullets to the chest. She was taken to the Peoples Medical College Hospital but died due to her injuries while on the way.

=== Trial ===
The gunman was identified as Waqar Khokhar who was sentenced to life imprisonment. The man was later murdered at a ceremony.
