= Naveed Aamir =

Pakistani politician

Member of the National Assembly of Pakistan
- Incumbent
- Assumed office 29 February 2024
- Constituency: Reserved seat for minorities
- In office 13 August 2018 – 10 August 2023
- Constituency: Reserved seat for minorities

Member of the Provincial Assembly of Punjab
- In office 2002–2007
- Constituency: Reserved seat for minorities

Personal details
- Born: 22 September 1975 (age 50) Sahiwal, Punjab, Pakistan
- Party: PPP (2002-present)

Naveed Aamir Jeeva is a Pakistani Christian politician of Pakistan Peoples Party- PPP, who had been a member of the National Assembly of Pakistan from August 2018 till August 2023 and Ex Member of the Provincial Assembly of Punjab in 2002.

== Qualification ==
- Master's degree in International Relations from Bahauddin Zakariya University, Multan
- B.ed from the University of Education
- B.A from Bahauddin Zakariya University, Multan
- Fsc from Emerson University, Multan
- Matriculation from Government Muslim Boys High School, Multan

== Political career ==
He was elected to the National Assembly- MNA of Pakistan as a candidate of Pakistan Peoples Party on a reserved seat for minorities in the 2018 Pakistani general election. He was elected as a Member of the Provincial Assembly in 2002 in Pervaiz Musharraf's Government on Minorities reserved seat from Pakistan Peoples Party.

In 2019, Naveed a Christian member of the National Assembly moved a bill to amend the article 41 and 91 of the Constitution which would allow non-Muslims to become Prime Minister and President of Pakistan. However, Pakistan's parliament blocked the bill.
