= Baqar Naqvi =

Urdu writer (1936–2019)

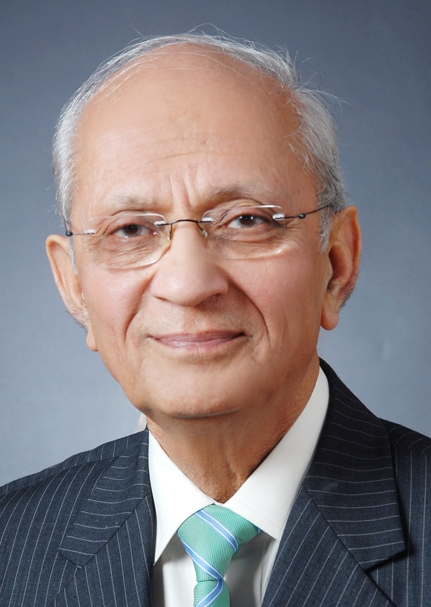
- Baqar Naqvi
- Born: Syed Mohammad Baqar Naqvi (Late); 4 February 1936
- Died: 13 February 2019 (aged 83)
- Education: CII London, Chartered Insurer
- Occupations: Urdu poet prose writer and translator Retired CEO
- Spouse: Feroza Naqvi
- Writing career
- Genre: Ghazal/Nazm/Prose/Translation
- Notable works: Nobel Adabiyaat; EFU Saga; Masnooei Zehaanat; Barqiyaat; Daaman; Ganga, Jamna, Saaraswati; Khulyay ki Dunya; Alfred Nobel; Moti Moti Rang; Mutthi Bhar Taaray; Taaza Hava

Baqar Naqvi (4 February 1936 – 13 February 2019) was a Pakistani poet, prose writer and translator in Urdu. His work includes Urdu poetry (genres - Ghazal and Nazm) Urdu prose – short stories, scientific publications, and translations in Urdu language.

His work on matters related to Alfred Nobel is first in the Urdu language.

A chartered insurer by profession, qualified ISO 9000 Lead Auditor, Baqar served as an assistant director of operations in CCL Assurance Ltd, London; executive director of EFU Life Assurance, and, twice as chief executive of ALLIANZ-EFU Health Insurance.

He died on 13 February 2019, aged 83.

== Published titles ==
- Hundred Years of Nobel Peace—Prose - (2012)
- Nobel Adabiyaat (Nobel Literature of 20th Century) Prose
- EFU Saga – (History) Urdu Translation - (2007)
- Msnooei Zehaanat (Artificial Intelligence) a brief review
- Barqiyaat - (Electronics) with Brief History of Inventions
- Daaman - Complete Poetic work (2005)
- Ganga, Jamna, Saaraswati - Selected Poems in Hindi
- Khaliyay ki Duniya (Genetics) - Prose (2001)
- Alfred Nobel - Life and Work - Prose (1999)
- Moti Moti Rang (Colored Pearls) - Poetry (1994)
- Mutthi Bhar Taaray (A Handful of Stars) - Poetry (1989)
- Taaza Hava (Fresh Air) - (1986)

== Recognition ==
- UBL-JANG Literary Excellence Award 2010 for the category Best Urdu Prose for the book Nobel Adbiyaat
- Taaza Hava - 'Best Book in the West' Award by Urdu Markaz International, Los Angeles
- Several Urdu Magazines have published Special Articles and insertions on Baqar Naqvi's work and contribution to Urdu Language.
