= 2019 Pakistan Army Beechcraft King Air crash =

Fatal aircraft crash

2019 Pakistan Army King Air 350i crash
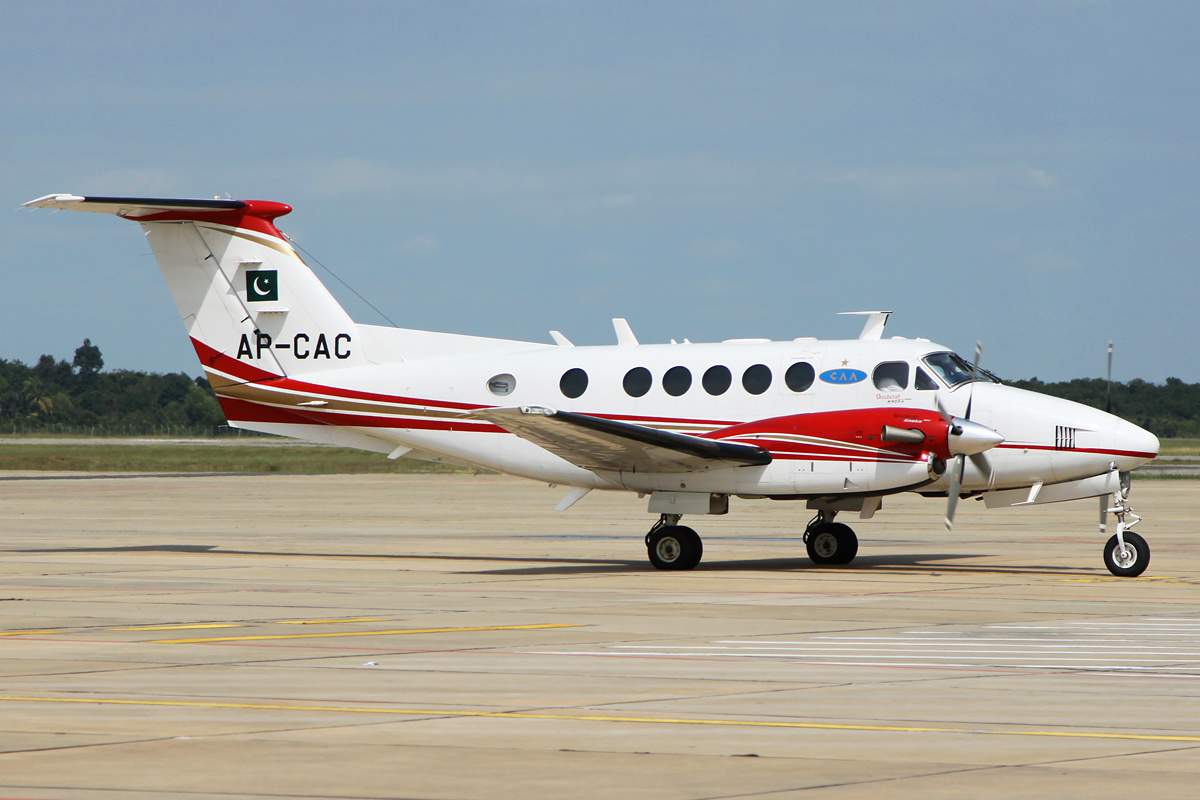
- A Beechcraft Super King Air similar to the crashed aircraft

Accident
- Date: 30 July 2019
- Summary: Impacted residential structures, cause remains unknown at this time
- Site: Mora Kalu, Rawalpindi, Punjab, Pakistan
- Total fatalities: 18
- Total injuries: Unknown

Aircraft
- Aircraft type: Beechcraft King Air 350i
- Operator: Pakistan Army
- Registration: FL-766
- Flight origin: PAF Base Nur Khan, Pakistan
- Destination: Unknown
- Occupants: 5
- Crew: 5
- Fatalities: 5
- Survivors: 0

Ground casualties
- Ground fatalities: 13
- Ground injuries: Unknown

On 30 July 2019, a Beechcraft King Air of the Pakistan Army crashed near Bahria Town, Rawalpindi. All five crew members, as well as 13 civilians, were killed when the plane crashed into a residential area.

== Aircraft ==
The accident aircraft was a Beechcraft King Air 350i registered in 2011 as FL-766 and operated by the Pakistan Army.

== Accident ==
The accident occurred at 02:00 local time (07:00 GMT) when a small Beechcraft King Air military plane operating a training flight for the Pakistan Army crashed into houses in the city of Rawalpindi, killing 18 people, many of whom were on the ground.

However, according to a local rescue member who said that 19 bodies including those of the five crew members and the bodies of 14 civilians who were sent to a local hospital. Among the victims there is also a family of 8 people, including 4 children.

== Aftermath ==
According to a tweet from the Pakistani Government, Prime Minister Imran Khan expressed his condolences to the families of the victims and wished a good recovery to the injured.

The accident has raised huge doubts about Pakistan's aviation safety due to many plane and helicopter crashes over the years. Among these are Pakistan International Airlines Flight 661 which occurred in 2016 when an ATR 42-500 crashed killing 47 occupants and AirBlue Flight 202 occurred in 2010 on an Airbus A321, which is considered the accident with the most victims on Pakistani soil with a total of 152 victims.

== Cause ==
The probable cause remains unknown, but it was reported by the BBC that the plane made a sharp turn shortly before the crash which may have led to the impact with residential structures.
