= Muhammad Arshad Khan Lodhi =

Pakistani politician (1937–2013)

Member of the Provincial Assembly of the Punjab
- In office 29 May 2013 – 29 December 2013

Personal details
- Born: 1 October 1937 Jalandhar, India
- Died: 29 December 2013 (aged 76)
- Party: Pakistan Muslim League (N)

Punjab Assembly Lahore

Muhammad Arshad Khan Lodhi (1 October 1937 - 29 December 2013) was a Pakistani politician who served as a Member of the Provincial Assembly of the Punjab, between 1985 and May 2018.

== Early life and education ==
He was born on 1 October 1937 in Jalandhar, India.

He graduated in 1959 from Government College, Lahore and has the degree of Bachelor of Arts and the degree of Bachelor of Laws which he received in 1966 from University of Karachi.

== Political career ==
He was elected to the Provincial Assembly of the Punjab from Constituency PP-204 (Sahiwal) in the 1985 Pakistani general election and became Provincial Minister of Punjab for Colonies, Revenue and Relief, Consolidation, Livestock and Dairy Development.

He was re-elected to the Provincial Assembly of the Punjab from Constituency PP-182 (Sahiwal) as a candidate of Islami Jamhoori Ittehad (IJI) in the 1988 Pakistani general election. He received 28,036 votes and defeated a candidate of Pakistan Peoples Party (PPP). He became Provincial Minister of Punjab for Revenue.

He was re-elected to the Provincial Assembly of the Punjab from Constituency PP-182 (Sahiwal) as a candidate of IJI in the 1990 Pakistani general election. He received 27,324 votes and defeated Haji Riaz Hussain, a candidate of Pakistan Democratic Alliance. He became Provincial Minister of Punjab for Revenue.

He ran for the seat of the Provincial Assembly of the Punjab from Constituency PP-182 (Sahiwal) as a candidate of Pakistan Muslim League (N) (PML-N) in the 1993 Pakistani general election, but was unsuccessful. He received 26,724 votes and lost the seat to Haji Riaz Hussain, a candidate of PPP.

He was re-elected to the Provincial Assembly of the Punjab from Constituency PP-182 (Sahiwal) as a candidate of PML-N in the 1997 Pakistani general election. He received 36,042 votes and defeated Haji Riaz Hussain, a candidate of PPP. He became Provincial Minister of Punjab for Industries & Mineral Development.

He was re-elected to the Provincial Assembly of the Punjab from Constituency PP-223 (Sahiwal-IV) as a candidate of Pakistan Muslim League (Q) (PML-Q) in the 2002 Pakistani general election. He received 24,762 votes and defeated Muhammad Hafeez Akhtar, an independent candidate.

He ran for the seat of the Provincial Assembly of the Punjab from Constituency PP-223 (Sahiwal-IV) as a candidate of PML-Q in the 2008 Pakistani general election but was unsuccessful. He received 22,982 votes and lost the seat to Muhammad Hafeez Akhtar, a candidate of PPP.

He was re-elected to the Provincial Assembly of the Punjab as a candidate of PML-N from Constituency PP-223 (Sahiwal-IV) in the 2013 Pakistani general election.

== Death ==
He died on 29 December 2013 after suffering heart attack.
