= 2017–18 Pakistan federal budget =

2017–18 Federal Budget
- Presented: 26 May 2017
- Parliament: National Assembly of Pakistan
- Party: Pakistan Muslim League (N)
- Finance minister: Ishaq Dar
- Treasurer: Ministry of Finance
- Total expenditures: Rs. 475,000 Crores
- Deficit: 4.00
- Website: Budget speech 2017-18

The Federal budget 2017–18 was the federal budget of Pakistan for the fiscal year beginning from 1 July 2017 and ending on 30 June 2018.

It was presented by Finance Minister Ishaq Dar on 26 May 2017 at the National Assembly with a total outlay of ₨. 4.75 tn. This is the fifth federal budget submitted during the tenure of Prime Minister Nawaz Sharif and his cabinet.

The budget was presented following a protest of the Pakistan Kissan Ittehad, demanding subsidies on fertilisers and electricity bills, at D-Chowk in Islamabad.

The budget proposed a 10.0% increase in the salaries and pensions of federal government employees and an increase in the minimum monthly wage from ₨. 14,000 to ₨. 15,000. The allocation made for Benazir Income Support Programme stood at ₨.121 billion for 5.5 million beneficiaries. The defence expenditure of ₨.920.2 billion (or 19.36% of total budget outlay) which was around 7% higher than it was in the outgoing year was set aside.

== Budget ==
	Original (Rs Billions)	Revised (Rs Billions)
Mark-up Payment	1363	1526.2
Development	1340.1	1062.8
Defence Affairs and Services	920.2	999.2
Grants and Transfers to Provinces / Others	430.2	461.6
Foreign Loans Repayment	286.6	428.1
Running of Civil Government	376.8	402
Pension (Military and Civil)	248	333.4
Subsidies	138.8	147.6
Total Expenditure	5103.8	5361
