= 2018 Pakistani provincial elections =

The 2018 Pakistani provincial elections may refer to:

- 2018 Balochistan provincial election
- 2018 Khyber Pakhtunkhwa provincial election
- 2018 Punjab provincial election
- 2018 Sindh provincial election
