= Ajmal Khan (botanist) =

Pakistani botanist (died 2019)

Muhammad Ajmal Khan
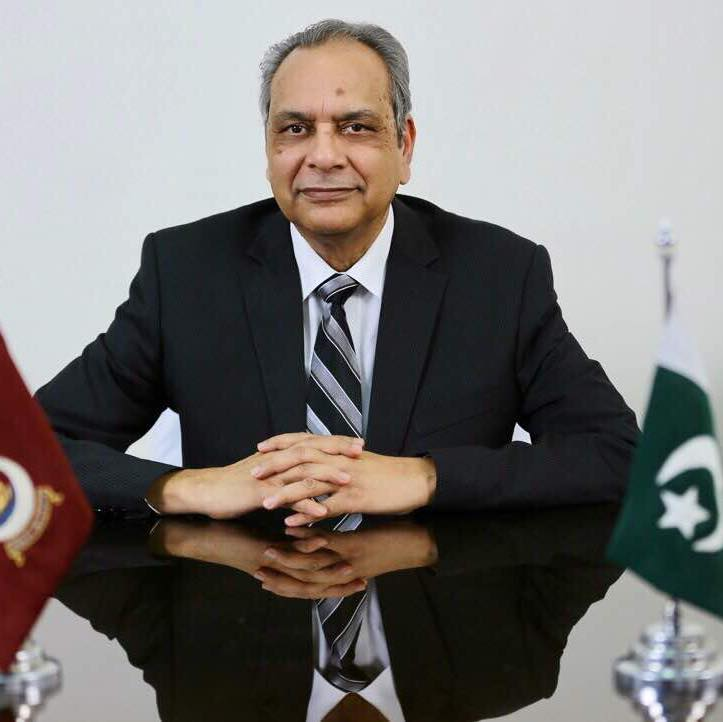
- Died: 4 May 2019; Karachi, Pakistan
- Education: University of Karachi; Ohio University
- Awards: Sitara-i-Imtiaz (Star of Excellence) Award by the President of Pakistan in 2008; Pride of Performance Award by the Government of Pakistan in 2002
- Scientific career
- Fields: Botany
- Workplaces: University of Karachi

Muhammad Ajmal Khan (died 4 May 2019) was a Pakistani botanist and the 17th Vice-Chancellor of University of Karachi.

== Education ==
Khan received his BSc (Hons) degree in botany in 1973, MSc in plant physiology in 1974 from University of Karachi, PhD in physiological ecology from Ohio University in 1985 and DSc in botany again from University of Karachi in 2010.

== Awards and honors ==
- Sitara-e-Imtiaz (Star of Excellence) awarded by the President of Pakistan in 2008.
- Fellow, Pakistan Academy of Sciences
- Presidential Pride of Performance, awarded in 2002.
- Fellow of The World Academy of Sciences (2003)
