= 2019 Pakistan floods and storms =

Natural disaster in Pakistan

2019 Pakistan Floods
- Date: 1 February 2019
- Location: Mainly Khyber Pakhtunkhwa, Balochistan, Punjab
- Deaths: 140+ deaths

From February to April 2019, widespread flash flooding affected large parts of Pakistan, most severely in Balochistan, KPK, Punjab, and other provinces. Pakistan has been hit by three major waves of rain and flooding over the course of more than one month. The first wave of rain began on 20 February, leading to flooding in to Khyber and Balochistan, therefore many villages and several cities have been evacuated, and more than 1,500 families has been rescued alone in Balochistan and many in other states. The 20 February rain and thunderstorms caused flash floods in the Lasbela area. The main areas affected were Turbat, Tump, Nasirabad and Dasht where 300 people were displaced due to the flood. These people were then moved to camps established by the Provincial Disaster Management Authority (PDMA). Casualties have came mostly due to roof collapsing amid heavy rains and flash flooding. Khyber Pakhtunwkha has witnessed the most deaths till now, 40, alongside Balochsitan has faced 26 casualties with more than 9 in Punjab and other places. Due to rain, flood and storm casualties are increasing.

== Timeline ==
- On 1 February, reportedly 4 people counted were killed in rain-related incidents in Pakistan.
- On 21 February, reportedly 28 people counted were killed by flash flooding, heavy storm, heavy snow and roof collapsing amid heavy rain in three days in KPK, Balochistan and Punjab.
- On 5 March, reportedly 25 people counted were killed by flash flooding in 4 days in KPK, Balochistan, Punjab.
- On 27 March, reportedly 6 people counted were killed by landslide due to heavy rain in 2 days in Balochistan.
- On 10 April, reportedly 6 people counted were killed by heavy raining in KPK.
- On 13 April, reportedly 12 people counted were killed by rain storm and flash flooding in KPK and Balochistan.
- On 14 April, reportedly 5 people counted were killed by Rain and dusty storm and Gutsy Wind in Karachi.
- On 17 April, reportedly 39 people counted were killed by Rain and dusty storm and Gutsy Wind in all states in three days.
- On 17 May, reportedly 2 people counted were killed by rain widespread in Sindh.
- On 19 May, reportedly 2 people counted were killed by rain widespread in Khyber Pakhtunkhwa.
- On 19 May, reportedly 2 people counted were killed by rain widespread in Khyber Pakhtunkhwa.
- On 20 May, reportedly one person counted was killed by Rain widespread in Khyber Pakhtumkhwa.
- On 21 May, reportedly one person counted was killed by Rain widespread in Balochistan.
- On 25 May, one person counted was killed by Rain widespread in Khyber Pakhtunkhwa.
- On 25 May, six people reportedly were killed by Rain widespread in Punjab.
- On July the 2019 Karachi floods occurred
