= Mariam Sultana =

Pakistani astrophysicist

Mariam Sultana is a Pakistani astrophysicist.

Sultana completed her doctoral studies in astrophysics at the University of Karachi under the supervision of Nuritdinov Salohitdin Nasritdinovich in 2012. She is the first woman to earn a Ph.D. in astrophysics in Pakistan. Sultana teaches as an assistant professor at the Federal Urdu University of Arts, Science and Technology.

== Biography ==
Mariam Sultana is from Karachi, the most populous city in Pakistan. She received her Masters of Sciences in Applied Mathematics from the University of Karachi in 2004. She started her Ph.D. course work in 2006 under the supervision of Salakhutdin Nuritdinov. She specialized in the field of astrophysics and completed her Ph.D. in 2012. She works in extragalactic astronomy and her research focuses on understanding the stability and the formation of ring galaxies. Her doctoral thesis was examined by James Binney and Ana Katrin Schenk.

== Awards and honors ==
Mariam won the Coca-Cola Beverages Pakistan Limited (CCBPL) Savvy and Successful Award in 2015. She has published 34 research papers in international journals and her work has been cited 64 times. She is the first female astrophysicist from Pakistan.

== Fellowships and memberships ==
- Assistant Professor at Federal Urdu University of Arts, Science and Technology (FUUAST),
- Research Associate at Karachi University’s (KU) Institute of Planetary Astrophysics, Karachi Pakistan.
