= 2018 attack on Chinese Consulate in Karachi =

2018 terrorist attack

Karachi Chinese consulate attack
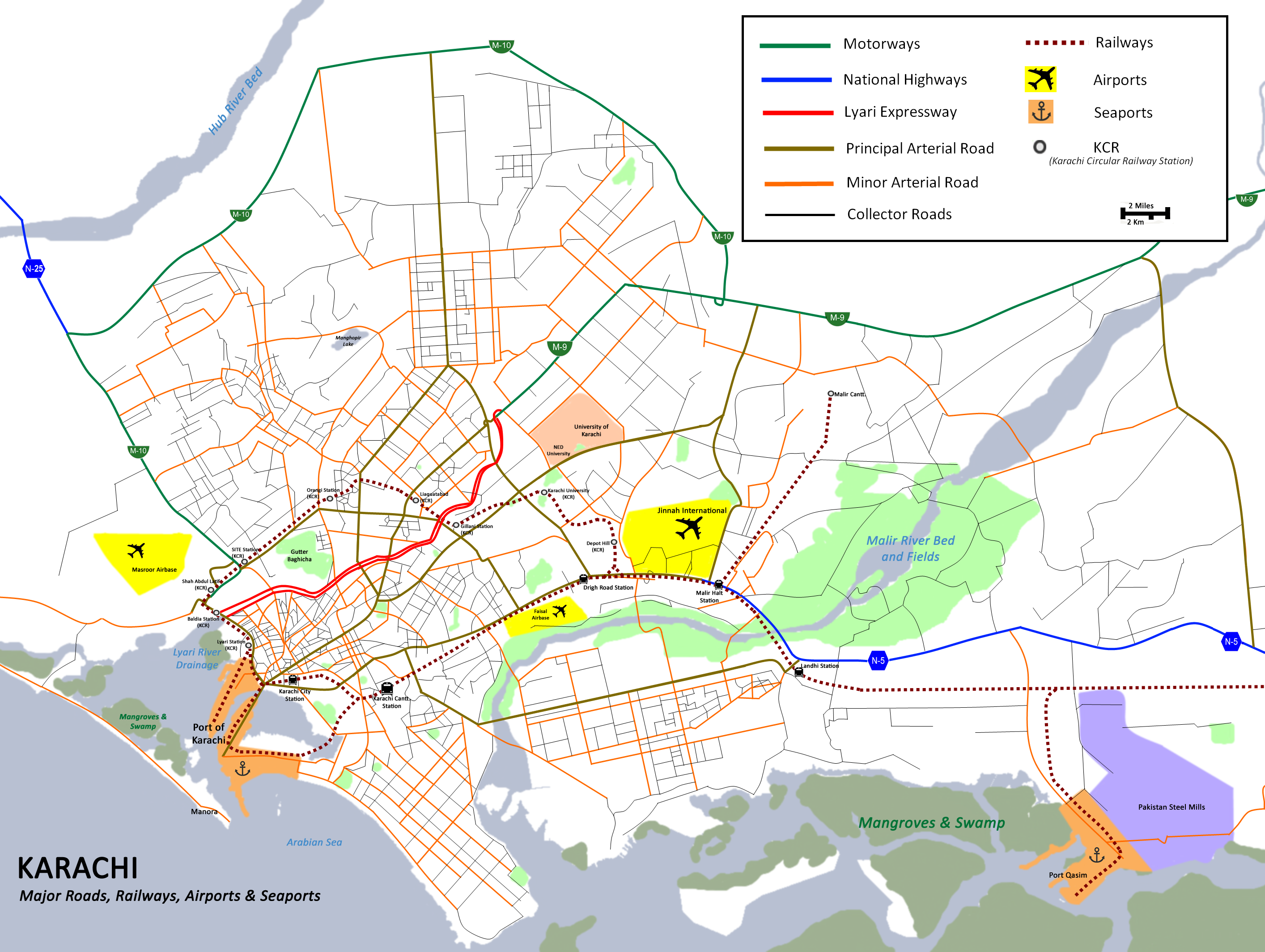
- Location: 24°48′21″N 67°01′53″E; Chinese consulate, Clifton, Karachi, Pakistan
- Date: 23 November 2018; 9:30 am - 10:00 am (PST)
- Attack type: Shooting, grenade attack
- Weapons: Guns, grenades
- Deaths: 7 (Including 3 perpetrators)
- Injuries: 1
- Perpetrator: Balochistan Liberation Army (claimed)

On 23 November 2018, an armed assault on the Chinese consulate in Clifton, Karachi, Pakistan killed seven people in an hour-long shootout. Those killed were two policemen, two Pakistani civilians and the three attackers. No Chinese nationals were injured or killed in the attack.

== Attack ==
According to the Counter Terrorism Department (CTD) officer Raja Umar Khattab, the attackers shot and killed the two policemen at the first check-post. The attackers then detonated hand grenades and also tried to open the main armored gate of the consulate with the help of C-4 explosives but did not succeed. The heavy firing and hand grenade blasts killed two civilians, and damaged one armored personnel carrier, two police vehicles and six other cars parked outside the consulate, of which three caught fire.

Policewoman Suhai Aziz Talpur, a senior superintendent of the Karachi Police, told reporters, "Around 9 am, I got the news that there was an attack at the Chinese consulate. I was already on my way to work so we redirected and rushed to the crime scene. I already had my guards with me, senior officers were on their way. In the meantime we gathered the bomb disposal squad and fire brigade as well." She organized and led the two-hour battle to defend the consulate. The battle ended after all three attackers were killed. According to Reuters, "Her fast response and actions during the nearly two-hour assault on the diplomatic mission in the southern port city have been praised for saving countless lives." She has been hailed as a hero in both Pakistan and China.

=== Victims ===
The policemen killed at the check-post were identified as Assistant Sub Inspector Ashraf Dawood and Constable Muhammad Amir by the Sindh Police. The two civilians killed were a father and son from Quetta, named Niaz Muhammad, 55, and Zahir Shah, 25, respectively; at the time they were waiting to renew their visas at the consulate. A private security guard Muhammad Jumman employed by the consulate was injured in the blast when he tried to stop the attackers from going past the barriers.

== Investigation ==
A first information report registered by Sindh Police's CTD on behalf of the state through Boat Basin SHO, booked BLA chief Hyrbyair Marri and twelve of his aides, including BLA commander Mian Aslam alias 'Achu' alias Meeraq Baloch, for masterminding and facilitating the attack. Police identified one of the attackers through fingerprints matched with National Database and Registration Authority records as Abdul Razzaq, son of Din Muhammad. On 24 November 2018, Balochistan Home Minister Mir Saleem Ahmed Khoso said that two brothers of Abdul Razzaq were arrested in Kharan.

According to AIG Dr Amir Shaikh, the attack was planned in Afghanistan and allegedly conducted with the support of India's spy agency Research and Analysis Wing with the aim of sabotaging the China-Pakistan Economic Corridor (CPEC).

On 26 May 2021, Anti Terrorism Court of Pakistan expressed displeasure at the failure of the prosecution to prove India's alleged role in the attack and present witnesses against suspected members of the Baloch Liberation Army for facilitating the attack on the Chinese consulate.

== Perpetrators ==
The Balochistan Liberation Army claimed responsibility for the attack in a tweet that included a photo of three men identified as Azal Khan Baloch, Razik Baloch and Rais Baloch. All of them were killed by police during the attack.

According to Express News, Aslam Baloch alias Achu - a commander of proscribed BLA, the mastermind of the attack on Chinese consulate was receiving medical treatment at the time at Max Hospital in New Delhi, India. Aslam Baloch alias Achu was later killed in a suicide attack in Kandahar on 25 December 2018. BLA spokesman confirmed Aslam Achu and five other BLA commanders' death in Kandahar.

== Reactions ==
Pakistani Prime Minister Imran Khan condemned the attack stating, "let there be no doubt in anyone's mind that we will crush the terrorists, whatever it takes." He said that "the attack was intended to scare Chinese investors and undermine CPEC" while adding "these terrorists will not succeed."

Chinese Foreign Ministry spokesman Geng Shuang during a regular press briefing said that "China strongly condemns any violent attacks against diplomatic agencies." He further said that the China-Pakistan Economic Corridor project would proceed despite the attack. The Deputy Chief of Mission at the Chinese embassy, Zhao Lijian, expressed appreciation for the Pakistan Army and police for their "timely and proper action" in response to the attack.

The Ministry of External Affairs, India, released an official statement on the day of the attack itself, saying that India strongly condemns the terror attack and that "the perpetrators of this heinous attack should be brought to justice expeditiously". The MEA also rejected allegations of Indian involvement by Pakistani officials, calling them "false" and "fabricated".

United States Chargé d'Affaires Ambassador Paul W. Jones, in a Twitter statement issued by the US embassy in Islamabad, said that the United States "condemns in the strongest terms today’s attack on the Chinese Consulate."

Karachi policewoman Suhai Aziz Talpur, who led the security operation that foiled the attack, became "a star" on Chinese social media. A photo of her surrounded by commandos went viral on social media in Pakistan.

== See also ==
- 2018 Orakzai bombing
