= Ayesha Chundrigar =

Pakistani activist

- Born: 30 September 1987 (age 38)
- Education: Master in Art in International Journalism
- Known for: Animal Rescue
- Website: https://www.acfanimalrescue.org/

Ayesha Chundrigar (Urdu: عائشہ چندریگر) is a Pakistani animal welfare activist, entrepreneur and journalist. She is founder of the Ayesha Chundrigar Foundation, a non profit animal rescue organization based in Karachi, Pakistan.

== Early life ==
Chundrigar was born on 30 September 1987. She graduated in 2009 with a degree in English Literature and Cinema Studies from the College of Arts & Science of the New York University. She is a licensed psychotherapist with the British Association for Counselling and Psychotherapy. She won the Green Innovation Challenge organized by WWF-Pakistan.

== Career ==
Chundrigar headed a refugee camp of 700 displaced people in Islamabad after the 2005 earthquake in Pakistan.
She founded Ayesha Chundrigar Foundation, also known as ACF in 2013 in Karachi. ACF began a rescue ambulance service and have an active rescue helpline. In 2020 the shelter has 500 animals of all kinds and is Pakistan's first animal shelter for street and homeless dogs, cats and different animals in Pakistan. ACF consists of seven core members as well as volunteers.
