= 2018 Orakzai bombing =

Terrorist attack in Pakistan

- Location: 33°44′44″N 70°57′35″E; Kalaya
- Date: 23 November 2018
- Attack type: Suicide bombing
- Deaths: 33 (+1 attacker)
- Injuries: 56
- Perpetrator: Islamic State – Khorasan Province

On 23 November 2018, at least 33 people were killed and 56 others were injured in a suicide bombing in Kalaya, Orakzai District, Khyber Pakhtunkhwa, Pakistan.

On the same day, an armed assault on the Chinese consulate in Karachi, Pakistan resulted in the deaths of four people and the three attackers. However, the two attacks are likely unconnected.

== Incident ==
On 23 November 2018, around 10:30 am PST a bomb blast on Friday in market Kalaya, Orakzai District, Khyber Pakhtunkhwa, Pakistan, the Islamic State – Khorasan Province later claimed responsibility for the bombing. At least 33 people were killed which included three members of the minority Sikh community and 56 others were injured. However a statement on Amaq, a news outlet associated with ISIL, claimed "57 Shiites were killed and 75 were wounded" in the bombing.

== See also ==
- List of terrorist incidents linked to Islamic State – Khorasan Province
