= Pakistan Agricultural Storage & Services Corporation =

Government-owned company

Pakistan Agricultural Storage & Services Corporation (PASSCO)
- پاکستان کارپوریشن برائے خدمات و تذخیرِ زراعت

Agency overview
- Formed: 1973; 53 years ago
- Jurisdiction: Government of Pakistan
- Headquarters: Lahore
- Agency executive: Mr. Sarfraz Durrani, Managing Director
- Website: www.passco.gov.pk

Pakistan Agricultural Storage & Services Corporation Ltd (PASSCO) (Urdu: پاکستان کارپوریشن برائے خدمات و تذخیرِ زراعت) is a Pakistani government-owned company working in the storage sector of Pakistan, under administrative control of Ministry of National Food Security and Research, Govt. of Pakistan. They are responsible for the storage of agricultural products from the whole country.

== History ==
It was founded in 1973.

As of 2009, PASSCO had a storage capacity of 1.3 million tons of wheat.
