= 2018–19 Pakistan federal budget =

2018–19 Federal Budget
- Presented: 28 April 2018
- Parliament: National Assembly of Pakistan
- Party: Pakistan Muslim League (N)
- Finance minister: Miftah Ismail
- Treasurer: Ministry of Finance
- Total revenue: ▲ Rs. 5.159 trillion (US$18 billion)
- Total expenditures: ▲ Rs. 5.932 trillion (US$21 billion)
- Debt payment: ▲ Rs. 2.221 trillion (US$7.7 billion)
- Deficit: ▲4.9%
- Website: Budget Brief

The Federal budget 2018–19 is the federal budget of Pakistan for the fiscal year beginning from 1 July 2018 and ending on 30 June 2019. The budget was presented by finance minister Miftah Ismail on 28 April 2018, just months before the general elections scheduled in the country for the next government.

The budget announced several measures; including an allocation Rs. 1,100 billion for defence expenditures; a ten percent hike in salaries and pensions of civil and military employees; a health tax enforced on tobacco and import taxes on cell phones; around Rs. 2.22 trillion were to be used for debt servicing; changes were made to the progressive taxation system, with no taxes to be deducted on people with annual incomes of up to Rs. 400,000; Rs. 25 billion were allocated for the health and medical sector under the Public Sector Development Programme, which would include several new projects; tax cuts were announced for the agriculture and dairy farming sectors; another Rs. 2.6 billion were announced for the National Accountability Bureau, which include employee expenses; all provinces were to get a total of Rs. 2.59 trillion as part of their share in the federal revenues; Rs. 18.2 billion would be spent on the fencing of the Afghanistan–Pakistan barrier on the border; Rs. 130 billion worth of additional levies were slapped on petroleum products; and finally, smaller expenses were announced for setting up a media development and television monitoring system. The budgets for the President and Prime Ministerial residences, borne out of tax-payers funds, had also risen notably.
