= Buttar (disambiguation) =

Buttar is a clan as well as surname of Jat people in the Punjab.

Buttar may also refer to:

== Surname ==
- Amna Buttar, a doctor and member of Provincial Assembly of Punjab, Pakistan
- Chris Buttars, a former Republican member of the Utah State Senate
- Maninder Buttar, Indian singer
- Muhammad Javed Buttar, a former justice of Supreme court of Pakistan
- Prit Buttar, British-Indian military historian
- Rashid Buttar, a holistic doctor based in North Carolina
- Rabinder Buttar, Indian biochemist
- Vinaypal Buttar, Indian actor and singer-songwriter

== Places ==
- Aasa Buttar, a village in Sri Muktsar Sahib district, Punjab
- Buttar Bakhuha, a village in Sri Muktsar Sahib district, Punjab
- Buttar Kalan, Gurdaspur, a village in Gurdaspur district
- Buttar Kalan, Moga, a village in Moga district, Punjab
- Buttar Sarinh, a village of Buttar Jatts in Sri Muktsar Sahib district, Punjab
- Buttar Sivia, a village in Amritsar district, Punjab
- Buttran, Punjab, a village in Jalandhar district, Punjab
- Gehri Buttar, a village of Buttars in Bathinda district, Punjab
- Kokri Buttran, a village of Buttars in Moga district, Punjab

== See also ==
- Butter (disambiguation)
- Butters (disambiguation)
