= Buttery =

Buttery may refer to:

== Things ==
- Buttery (bread), a savoury Scottish bread roll
- Buttery (shop), a storeroom for liquor
- Buttery (room), a service room in a large medieval household

== People ==
- Arthur Buttery (1908–1990), English footballer
- Frank Buttery (1851–1902), American baseball player
- Guy Buttery (born 1983), South African musician primarily known as a guitar player
- John Buttery (c. 1829–1912), British merchant operating in the Straits Settlements

== Other uses ==
- Imperial Buttery, a division of the Imperial Household Department in charge of cooking ordinary meals for the Qing court.

== See also ==
- Butter (disambiguation)
- Buttrey, surname
