= Sarinh =

Sarinh or Sarih may refer to:

- Sarinh, Jalandhar, a village in Jalandhar district, Punjab
- Sarinh, Ludhiana, a village in Ludhiana district, Punjab
- Buttar Sarinh, a village in Sri Muktsar Sahib district
