= Yalova Peninsula massacres =

Series of massacres during 1920–1921

- Part of the Greco-Turkish War (1919–22)
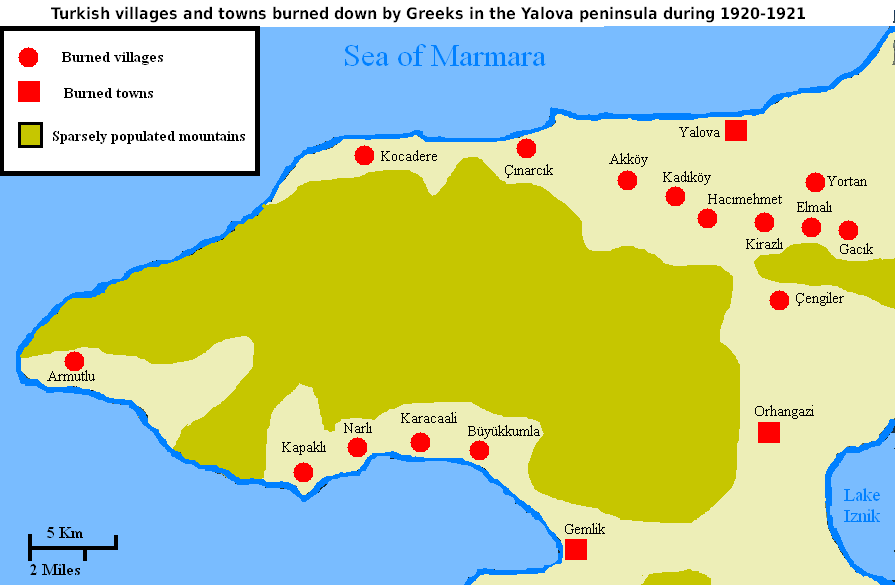
- Map of targeted villages and towns on the peninsula
- Location: Ottoman Empire, present-day Yalova and Bursa Province, Turkey
- Date: c. September 1920 – July 1921
- Target: Muslims, Turks
- Attack type: Mass murder, mass rape, theft, torture
- Deaths: 27 villages burned, estimates: 300 (April–July 1921); Ottoman inquiry of 177 survivors reported 35 as killed, wounded, beaten, or missing. 1,500 out of 7,000 Muslims remained in the region after the events or 6,000 had disappeared.
- Perpetrators: Undisciplined parts of the Hellenic Army; Groups of local Greeks, Armenians and Circassians
- Motive: Islamophobia • Anti-Turkish sentiment • Megali idea

The Yalova Peninsula massacres (Turkish: Yalova katliamı, lit. 'Yalova massacre') were a series of massacres during 1920–1921, the majority of which occurred during March – May 1921. They were committed by local Greek, Armenian and Circassian bands, "assisted by drunken and undisciplined Greek troops", against the Muslim Turkish population of the Yalova Peninsula. There were 27 villages burned and in Armutlu. According to journalist Arnold J. Toynbee c. 300 Muslims were killed during April–July 1921. In an Ottoman inquiry of 177 survivors in Constantinople, the number of victims reported was very low (35), which is in line with Toynbee's descriptions that villagers fled after one to two murders. Moreover, approximately 1,500 out of 7,000 Muslims remained in the region after the events or 6,000 had left Yalova where 16 villages had been burned. On the other hand, Ottoman and Turkish documents on massacres claim that at least 9,100 Muslim Turks were killed.

The high death toll in the events convinced Toynbee that the Greeks were unfit to rule over Turks. An Inter-Allied commission, consisting of British, French, American and Italian officers, (Note: General Hare, the British Delegate; General Bunoust, the French Delegate; General Dall'Olio, the Italian Delegate; Admiral Bristol, the American Delegate.) and headed by Maurice Gehri, the representative of the Geneva International Red Cross, and Arnold Toynbee went to the region to investigate the atrocities.

One of the results was that refugees were transported to Allied-controlled Constantinople on ships.

== Background ==
=== Greco-Turkish War (1919–1922) ===
After World War I, the Ottoman Empire officially surrendered to the Entente Powers and it had to disband its army. At the peace conference the British and French tried to secure territory for the Kingdom of Greece in Smyrna and its surrounding regions. As a result, the Greek army, with the support of the Entente Powers, invaded Anatolia and occupied Smyrna. The Ottoman government and Turkish nationalists, which included people from all layers of Turkish society ranging from soldiers to civilians, under the command of Mustafa Kemal Pasha, resisted against this decision. The latter formed a new Turkish National Movement based in central Anatolia, whose aim was to repel the foreign forces that remained in Anatolia. On the other hand, the Greek army was given the task by the allies to end the Turkish Nationalist government. Following the Greco-Turkish War (1919–1922) the Greek army was defeated and forced to retreat. During its retreat (August–September 1922) the Greek army carried out a scorched-earth policy and laid waste to many Turkish cities and villages and committed massacres against its inhabitants.

=== Population ===
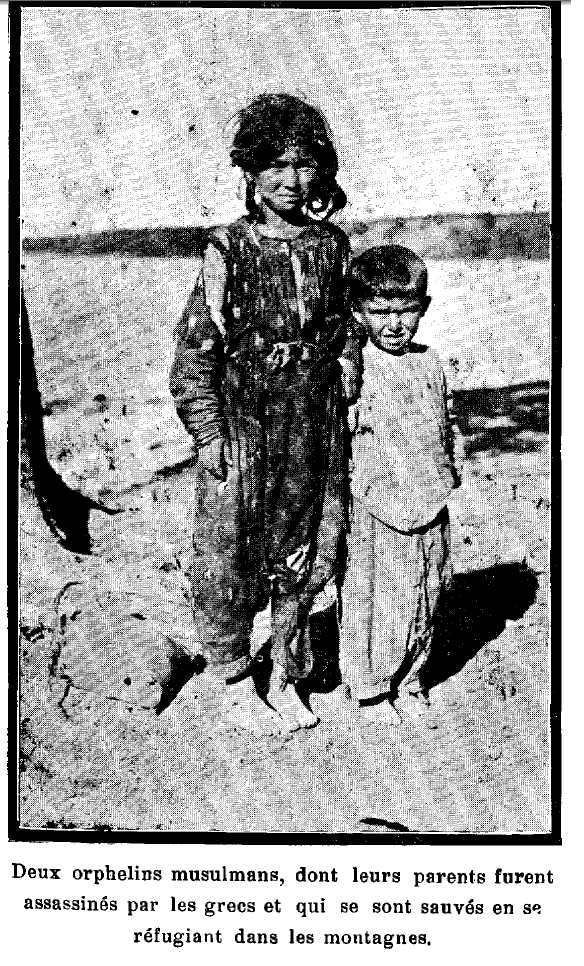
Two Muslim orphan children whose parents were killed.

The peninsula's population before World War I included an ethnically diverse population including Muslims, Greeks and Armenians. Many Muslim refugees had settled in this area during the 19th-century founding their own villages. The Kaza of Orhangazi had a majority of Armenians, with a minority of Muslims (34%). The kaza of Yalova had also a minority of Muslims in 1914 (36%), with Christians being also in majority (Greeks and Armenians). The Kaza of Gemlik was 57% Muslim but the town of Gemlik was almost entirely (90%) Greek by the time of the war. Gemlik was surrounded by Greek, Armenian and Muslim Turkish villages. Most of the Armenians in the region were deported during the Armenian genocide and their villages burned. Only a small part, some 2,000, were present at Gemlik in 1921. In 1921 there were 3,500 Greek refugees in Gemlik, mostly from areas around Iznik where they had been subject to Turkish atrocities.

Population table of 1914.

Distribution of population in the region before World War I in 1914
Religion	Gemlik	Yalova	Orhangazi
Muslims	16,373	7,954	11,884
Greeks	8,568	10,274	N/A
Armenians	3,348	3,304	22,726
Others	N/A	N/A	157
Total	28,289	21,532	33,767

An additional factor that lead to violence was the return of Greek refugees to their homes, who had been dislocated as a result of the Ottoman ethnic cleansing policies during World War I. On the other hand, thousands of Turkish refugees from the Balkan Wars, who had occupied their homes in the meantime, were expelled. This turn of events created a rural proletariat apt for brigandage and violence by irregular groups. According to a report of the Allied commission the events during World War I and the problems of the refugees were not the primary reason of the thorough destruction of numerous Turkish villages and towns in the Gemlik-Yalova Peninsula. They stated that the massacres and destruction was carried out according to a plan by the Greek army who also encouraged the local Greek and Armenians to participate.

== Massacres in 1920–21 in Gemlik-Yalova Peninsula ==
=== Events between August 1920 and March 1921 ===
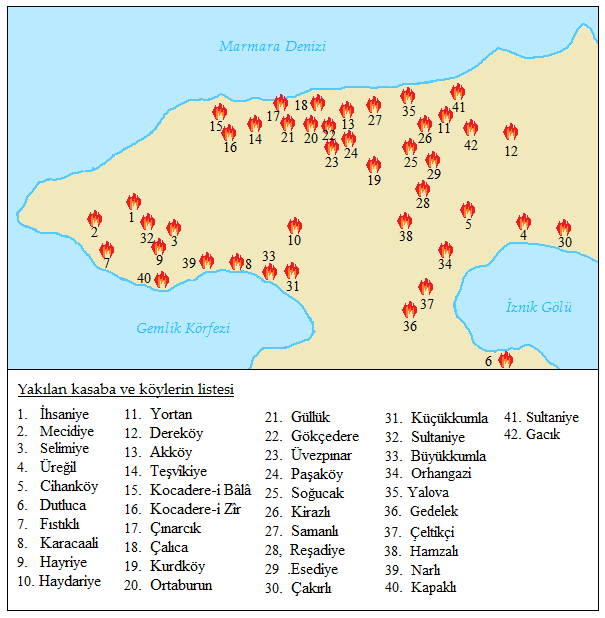
Map of the affected areas and burnt villages

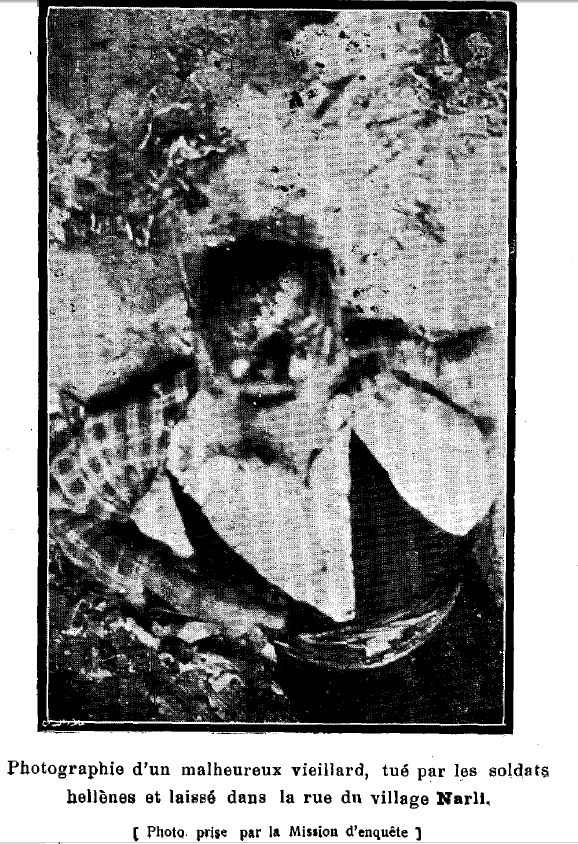
Murdered old man in Narli village.

After the defeat of the Ottoman Empire in World War I the peninsula was occupied by Great Britain. At the end of 1920 control of the region was ceded to Greek troops. The advance of the Greek forces in June–July 1920 eastwards, outside of the 'Smyrna zone', brought an inter ethnic conflict in the İzmit district between Turkish and Greek regulars and some Circassian mercenaries, the latter acting in a subordinate role according to Toynbee. Turkish irregulars responded by attacking Christian villages in the Iznik region, east of Yalova and outside the area controlled by the Greek forces. In the nearby city of Iznik, some 539 Greeks, 20 Armenians and 18 Jews were killed on 15 August 1920. Greek and Armenian survivors from deportations of World War I who had returned to their villages were also subject of atrocities, massacres and village burnings by Turkish gangs. Most of these atrocities happened in villages east of lake Iznik. The documents in the Ottoman archives accuse the Christian emigres of committing the same atrocities and this is agreed by the western allied report. During the battles in spring 1920 between Turkish and Greek forces, the Greek advance failed.

Ever since summer 1920 the Greek forces held an extensive and largely Muslim area, in which groups of nationalist Turks engaged in espionage along with the Turkish Kuva-yi Milliye bands operating against the Greek lines of communication. In the aftermath of the Greek failure, Greek troops took vengeance on Turkish villages which they suspected of harbouring anti-Greek activity and in search of hidden weapons. The Ottoman documents indicate that the local Turkish villages were disarmed and so became easy prey to the local Greek/Armenian gangs to plundered them.

Following the Greek occupation complaints were made by the local Turkish population to the Ottoman and Allied authorities against Greek atrocities but apparently without much effect. In a report from the Ottoman gendarmerie of Balikesir region to the gendarmerie headquarters it was stated that since the Greek occupation (August 1920) the Turkish population was subjected to cases of killings, torture, rape and theft. The weapons of the Muslim population were collected and handed over to the local Greeks and Armenians. According to Ottoman archive documents, the villages of Dutluca (7 September 1920), Bayırköy and Paşayayla in the region of Orhangazi were burned and the population massacred. In the Yalova area, the village of Çınarcık was looted and locals mistreated, some killed.

The Greek army captured Orhangazi on 16 October 1921 after resistance by Turkish militias. The next day there was a massacre in the nearby Turkish village of Çakırlı, men were locked in the local mosque where they were burned alive and shot. Two days later on 18 October 1921 the nearby Turkish village of Üreğil (consisted of 90 families) was burned down. On 16 April, the some 1,000 Turkish inhabitants of Orhangazi were sent to Gemlik by the Greek army while the town was partially burned down the same day by the Greeks. The refugees reached Gemlik under very difficult circumstances, most were robbed and some killed on the way. They were later evacuated by the Allied commission to Istanbul by boat. The next day on 17 April, there was a massacre in the village of Gedelek which was burned. The Ottoman gendarmerie reported the attack on the village of Ali Al Sabah. On 10 May 1921 the village was looted by Christian paramilitaries and the women were raped.

=== Investigation of the Allied commission (13–23 May 1921) ===
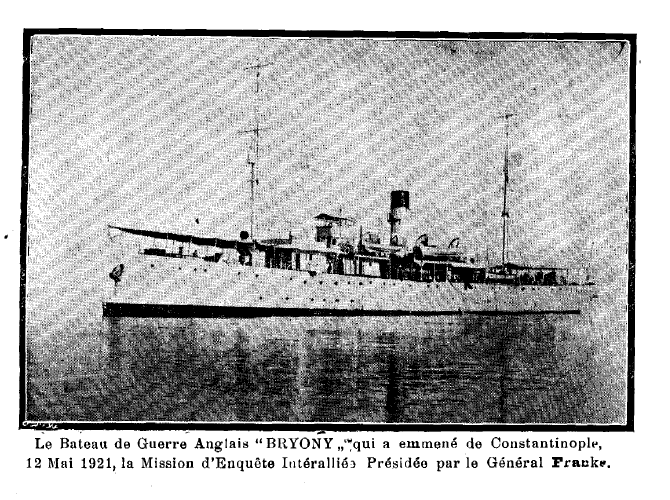
The British warship Bryony which transported the commission.

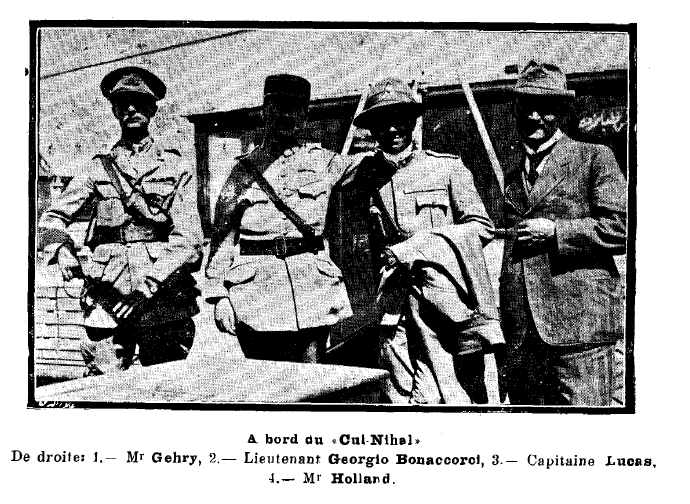
The commission

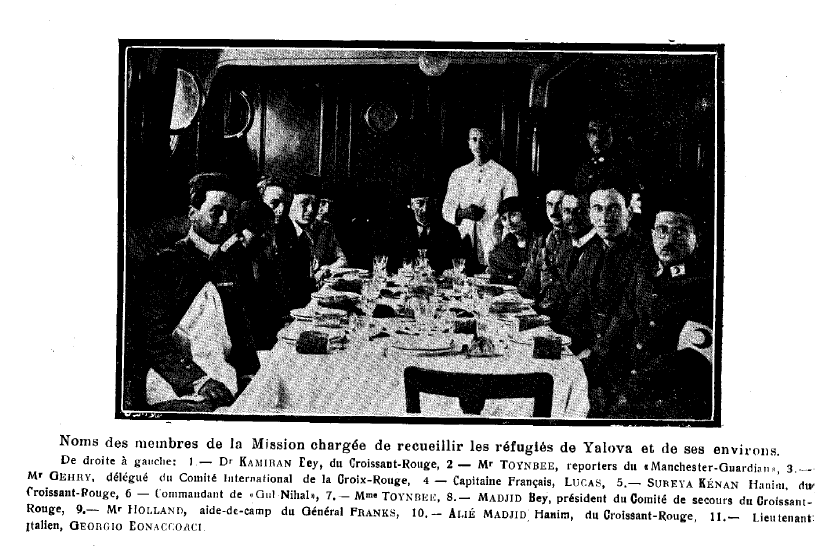
Members of the interallied humanitarian mission

Finally in May 1921, an Inter-Allied commission, consisting of British, French, American and Italian officers, and the representative of the Geneva International Red Cross, Maurice Gehri, was set up to investigate the situation. They sailed with the ship "Bryony" and reached Gemlik on 12 May. On 13 May 1921 the commission started on his investigation by visiting the burned villages of Çertekici, Çengiler (Armenian village burned by Turks) and Gedelek. In Çertekici they found 4 Greek soldiers committing arson to remaining buildings. Then they returned to Gemlik. Here they listened to the Turkish refugees who had gathered there, most of them were from Orhangazi which was burnt by the Greek army one month before, on 16 April. The refugees complained that they had been robbed on the way to Gemlik by Greeks and Armenians. The commission listened to various cases; including the rape and torture of a sixty years old women by six Greek soldiers.

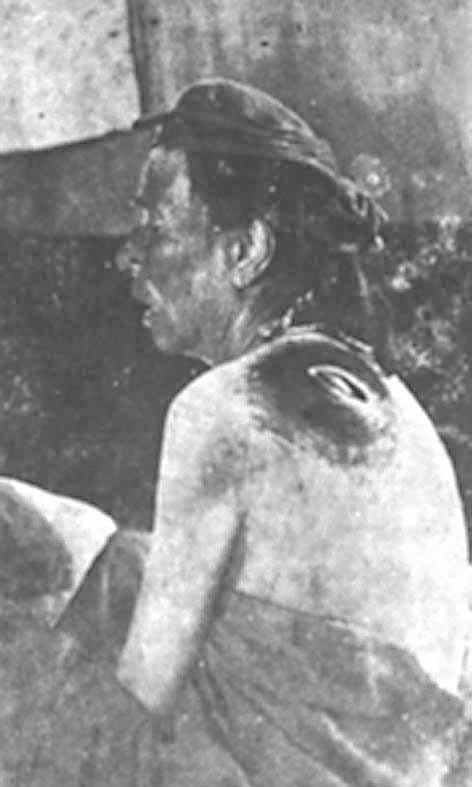
Wounded woman in Kapakli by bayonet

The commission listened to the Turkish refugees from Orhangazi. On 14 May the commission listened to the cases of the Greek and Armenian refugees. On Sunday 15 May the commission found out that the Turkish villages of Kapaklı, Narlı and Karacaali were burning, the same evening they went by the boat Bryony to the shore of Karacaali and found on the beach the corpses of 11 Turks who had been killed several hours before with bayonets. The next day they went to Kapaklı, where they found 8 bodies, 4 of them women. They listened to the people in Karacaali who declared that 40 women had been taken away by the Greeks.

On 16 May the commission went to the village of Küçük Kumla, the local Turkish population was hiding in their houses out of fear, but when they realized it was the Allied commission a group of 1,000 villagers gathered around them. They told that the situation was terrible since one month and that last Thursday a group of 60–65 Greek soldiers accompanied by 40 Greek civilians came to the village and killed three men and wounded one woman. The day before another Greek group had killed 8–9 people. Later that day the commission went to the village of Kapaklı which had been burning for three days. They found 8 bodies under the rubble, 4 of them women. The survivors told the commission that Greek soldiers were responsible. Then the commission investigated the village of Narlı, which had been burned down and was still burning. The commission found similar cases in the area around Yalova where 16 Muslim villages had been burned down. They landed there on 21 May and after investigation, found the twin villages of Kocadere destroyed, then they returned to Constantinople on 22 May.

=== Transport of the refugees ===
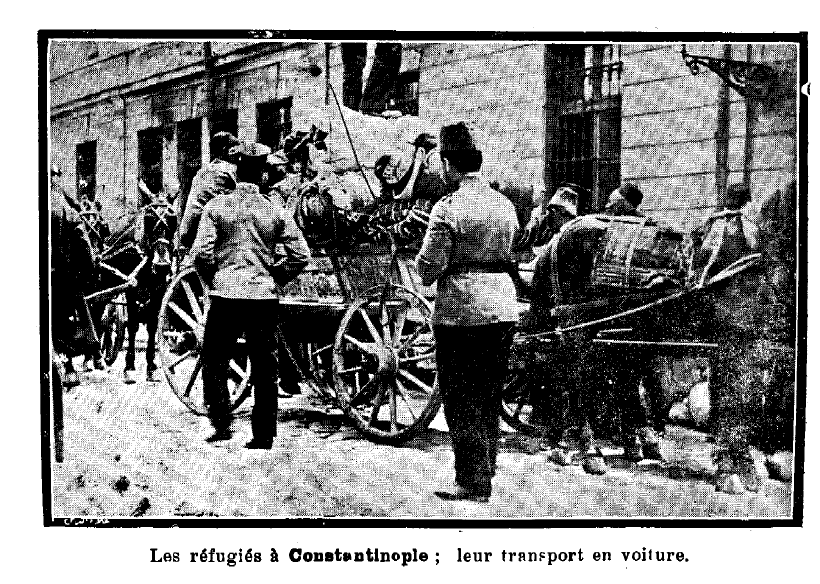
Muslim refugees from Yalova in Constantinople.

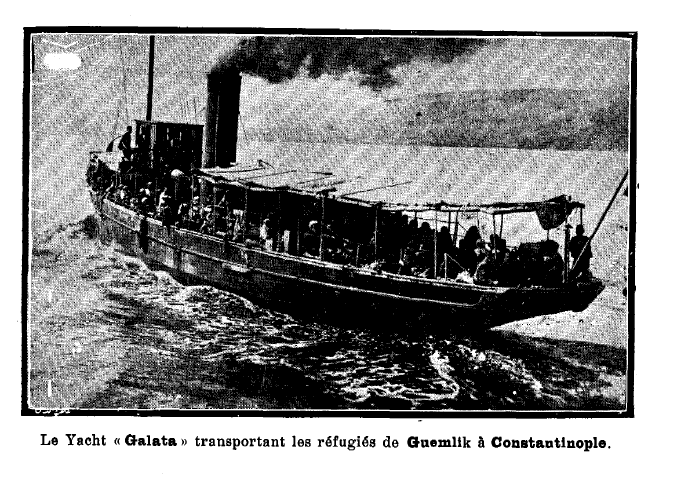
Evacuation of the Muslims to Constantinople.

It became clear to the commission that between March – May 1921 the population had been massacred or fled on a very large scale. Almost all villages and towns had been burned, while the survivors were crammed up in a few locations. First the villages were plundered and almost all of the villagers' livestock were taken away from them, then there was raping and killing and finally their houses were burned. Muslims were hiding in the mountains around Gemlik fearing to be killed. To protect the Muslims of further atrocities, the allied commission decided to transport refugees with boats to Istanbul. Muslims around Gemlik were evacuated in several parties to Constantinople. But Greek officers insisted on retaining the able bodied men guaranteeing proper treatment, the commission accepted. In the north, one small vessel carried 320 mostly women and children from Yalova to Constantinople. The Greek commander tried to prevent their departure. Later two more transports took place.

=== Conclusion of the Allied commission ===
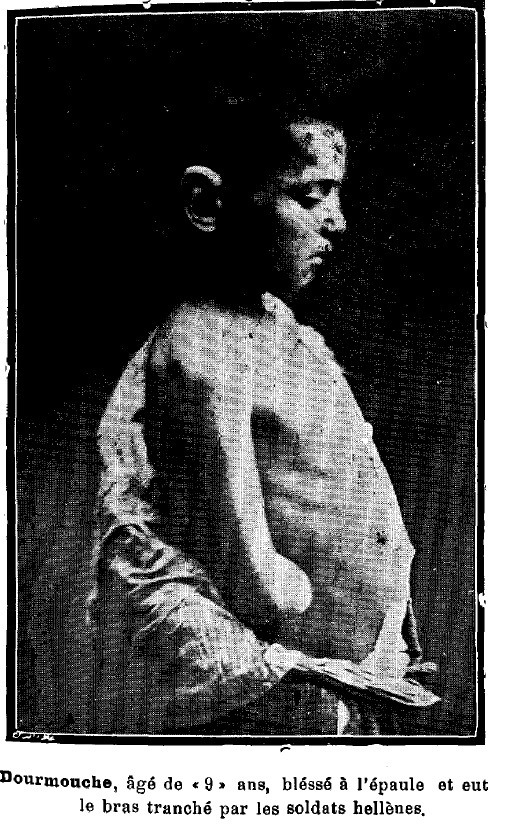
A boy wounded and hand cut off

The Inter-Allied commission, consisting of British, French, American and Italian officers, and the representative of the Geneva International Red Cross, Maurice Gehri, prepared two separate collaborative reports on their investigations in the Yalova-Gemlik Peninsula. These reports found that Greek forces committed systematic atrocities against the Turkish inhabitants. And the commissioners mentioned the "burning and looting of Turkish villages", the "explosion of violence of Greeks and Armenians against the Turks", and "a systematic plan of destruction and extinction of the Moslem population". In their report of 23 May 1921, the Inter-Allied commission stated as follows:

A distinct and regular method appears to have been followed in the destruction of villages, group by group, for the last two months... there is a systematic plan of destruction of Turkish villages and extinction of the Muslim population. This plan is being carried out by Greek and Armenian bands, which appear to operate under Greek instructions and sometimes even with the assistance of detachments of regular troops.

According to Maurice Gehri the massacres in the Gemlik-Yalova Peninsula were a result of the defeat of the Greek army at the Battle of İnönü.

"At the time of our investigation, the Peninsula of Samanli- Dagh [the Yalova-Gemlik Peninsula] was behind the Greek front, and it has never been a theatre of hostilities since the beginning of the Greek occupation. Until March last, the region was quiet. The crimes which have come to our knowledge fall within the last two months (end of March to the 15th May). They are subsequent to the retreat of the Greek army after the defeat of Eski Shehir [In Önü]. Possibly they are a consequence of it." – Maurice Gehri

The later famous historian Arnold J. Toynbee was active in the area as a war reporter, Toynbee stated that he and his wife were witnesses to the atrocities perpetrated by Greeks in the Yalova, Gemlik, and İzmit areas and they not only obtained abundant material evidence in the shape of "burnt and plundered houses, recent corpses, and terror stricken survivors" but also witnessed robbery by Greek civilians and arsons by Greek soldiers in uniform in the act of perpetration.

=== Legacy ===
The village of Kocadere and Akköy commemorate each year their victims at their respective local monument. Turkish writer Mehmet Ballı is the author of the historical novel Engere focusing on the events.

== Tables ==
=== Burned villages according to Ottoman archives ===
List of atrocities at the villages, according to Ottoman documents page 234-235
Villages	Number of inhabitants	Notes
Teşvikiye	430	Muslim Georgian village. Population was massacred, buildings were burned.
Kocadere-i Bâlâ	350	Population was massacred, buildings were burned.
Kocadere-i Zîr	550	Population was massacred, buildings were burned.
Çınarcık	550	Massacred and plundered, only 20 people survived.
Çalıca	120	Population was massacred, buildings were burned.
Kurtköy	400	Population was massacred, buildings were burned.
Ortaburun	150	Village founded and populated by Muslim Georgians and Lazes from Batumi (1893). Population was massacred, buildings were burned.
Günlük[Güllük]	200	Burned, population fled, two people were killed.
Gökçedere	100	Majority of buildings were plundered and burned.
Üvezpınar	150	A Laz village. Burned, population partly massacred, partly fled.
Paşaköy	350	Population was massacred, buildings were burned.
Solucak [Soğucak]	200	Circassian village. Population was massacred, buildings were burned.
Kirazlı	250	Population was massacred, buildings were burned.
Yortan	250	Population was massacred, buildings were burned.
Dereköy	250	Population was massacred, buildings were burned.
Akköy	550	Majority of the population was massacred.
Samanlı	150	Population was massacred, buildings were burned.
Reşadiye	1250	Avar village. Totally burned, population was massacred.
Esadiye	250	Avar village. Totally burned, population was massacred.
Çakırlı	550	Totally burned, population was massacred.
Üreğil	700	Totally burned, population was massacred.
Cihanköy	250	Population fled, village was plundered.
Dutluca	850	Large scale massacres, buildings were burned.
Fıstıklı	550	Population fled, village was plundered.
Karacaali	650	Population partly massacred, village plundered and burned.
Mecidiye	200	Village founded and populated by Muslim Georgians and Lazes. Population partly massacred, village plundered and burned.
Selimiye	700	Totally burned, population was massacred.
Lütfiye	100	Population partly massacred, village plundered and burned.
Hayriye	250	Population partly massacred, village plundered and burned.
Haydariye	250	A Georgian village. Population partly massacred, village plundered and burned.
Ihsâniye	100	Population partly massacred, village plundered and burned.
Küçükkumla	150	Population partly massacred, village plundered and burned.
Sultaniye	100	Avar village. Population partly massacred, village plundered and burned.
Büyükkumla	620	Population partly massacred, village plundered and burned.
Total Population:	12,430	Total Massacred: >9,143

=== Burned villages around Yalova according to Toynbee ===
List of villages destroyed in the Yalova district during April and May 1921, according to Arnold Toynbee
Name of villages	Original number of houses	Number of houses burned
Çalıca	40–50	all
Kurtköy	100	all
Ortaburun	40	all
Güllük	50–60	all
Gökçedere	30–40	all
Üvezpınar	50–60	all
Paşaköy	80–90	all
Sığırcık	80	all
Kirazlı	60	all
Yortan	40–60	all
Dereköy	40–60	all
Resadiye	400	all
Sultaniye	10–40	all
Gacık	100	half
Total	1,160–1,300	14½ villages burned
A farm named Şükrü Efendi Çiftliği was also burned. NOTE.—The district covered by the above villages, together with Akköy and Samanlı, is less than a quarter of the total area of the Yalova–Gemlik peninsula, the boundaries of which, on the land side, roughly coincide with the road from Gemlik to Yalova via Pazarköy.

== Commemoration ==
The victims of the Yalova massacres are commemorated annually on 29 April at the Kocadere Martyrdom Monument in Kocadere village—the site of the largest single massacre in the region—with the participation of local citizens and government officials. The commemoration ceremony features a cortege march, the recitation of the Quran, and a memorial service held at the village martyr's monument.

== See also ==
- İzmit massacres
- Persecution of Muslims during Ottoman contraction
