= Gehri =

Gehri is a surname. Notable people with the surname include:

- Hermann Gehri (1899–1979), Swiss freestyle wrestler and Olympic champion
- Maurice Gehri, Swiss Delegate of the International Committee of the Red Cross during the Gemlik-Yalova Peninsula massacres

== See also ==
- Gehri Buttar, is a normal sized village in the Bathinda district of Eastern Punjab (India)
- Gehri Chaal, Bollywood Action thriller film
- Gehri Chot - Urf: Durdesh, is an Indo-Canadian and Bangladeshi co-production film
