= Ilıpınar =

Ilıpınar can refer to:

- Ilıpınar, Atkaracalar
- Ilıpınar, Taşova
- Ilıpınar Mound
