= Punjab State Highway 11 =

State highway in India

State Highway 11

Route information
- Maintained by Public Works Department, Punjab, State Government of Punjab, India
- Length: 75 km (47 mi)

Major junctions
- From: Ludhiana, Punjab
- To: Sangrur, Punjab

Location
- Country: India
- Districts: Ludhiana and Sangrur
- Primary destinations: Ludhiana, Sarinh, Dehlon, Nanakpur Jaghera, Malerkotla, Dhuri and Sangrur

Highway system
- Roads in India; Expressways; National; State; Asian; State Highways in

Punjab State Highway 11, commonly referred to as SH 11, is a state highway in the state of Punjab in India. This state highway runs through Ludhiana district and Sangrur district from Ludhiana to Sangrur in the state of Punjab. The total length of the highway is 75 kilometres.

== Route description ==
The route of the highway is Ludhiana-Sarinh-Dehlon-Nanakpur Jaghera-Kup Kalan-Malerkotla-Dhuri-Sangrur.

== Major junctions ==
- National Highway 7 in Sangrur
- Major District Road 90 (MDR 90) in Dehlon

== See also ==
- List of state highways in Punjab, India
