= Butterfish =

Butterfish may refer to:

- Stromateidae, found in coastal waters off the Americas, western Africa and in the Indo-Pacific
- Sablefish (Anoplopoma fimbria), found in muddy sea beds in the North Pacific Ocean
- Rock gunnel (Pholis gunnellus), ray-finned fish, found in the coastal waters of the North Atlantic Ocean and in the Atlantic part of the Arctic Ocean
- Pacific rudderfish (Psenopsis anomala), also as Japanese butterfish and simply butterfish, found in the Western Pacific, near Japan, in the Taiwan Strait and in the East China Sea
- Pentapodus nagasakiensis, also known as Japanese butterfish or Japanese whiptail, found in the Western Pacific.
- Escolar is sometimes fraudulently labelled as butterfish.

== See also ==
- Butter catfish (disambiguation)
