= Kokri Behniwal =

Kokri Behniwal Kokri Vehniwal
- village
- Location in Punjab, India Kokri Behniwal (India)
- Coordinates: 30.875174°N 75.328102°E
- Country: India
- State: Punjab
- District: Moga

Languages
  - Official: Punjabi
- Time zone: UTC+5:30 (IST)

Kokri Behniwal is a village in the Moga district of Punjab, India. It lies about 7 km from the Ludhiana-Ferozepur Grand Trunk Road, near Ajitwal.

== See also ==
- Kokri Buttran
- Buttar Kalan
