= Ramunwala Harchoka =

Coordinates: 30.726°N 75.230°E

Ramunwala Harchoka is a village in Moga district in the Indian state of Punjab. It is approximately 5 kilometers from the village Buttar Kalan. The village is about 11 kilometers from Moga and about 32 kilometers from Jagraon.

The village has mainly two pockets. One is called Model Patti and the other one is simply Harchoka. The villagers are mainly Sikhs of Gill gotra. The village has three Gurudwaras. One is in Model Patti and the other two are in Harchoka Patti. There is also a mosque in the village as a few houses of Muslim Gujjars are there in the Harchoka Patti. The village has two schools run by the state government. One is a primary school and the other one is up to secondary classes.
