= Sarih, Jalandhar =

Sarinh
- Village
- Location in Punjab, India Sarinh (India)
- Coordinates: 31.141°N 75.559°E
- Country: India
- State: Punjab
- District: Jalandhar
- Talukas: Nakodar

Government
  - Type: Panchayati raj (India)
  - Body: Gram panchayat

Languages
  - Official: Punjabi
  - Regional: Punjabi
- Time zone: UTC+5:30 (IST)
- PIN: 144043
- Telephone code: 0181-123456
- Nearest city: Nakodar

Sarinh (Punjabi: ਸਰੀਂਹ; also spelled as Sarih) is an old and noted village in the Nakodar tehsil of Jalandhar district in Punjab, India. The marriage party of the fifth Sikh guru, Guru Arjan Dev stayed here for a while on their way back home.

== Geography ==
Sarinh or Sarih, approximately centered at 31°08′28″N 75°33′32″E, is located on the Nakodar-Phagwara road. Shankar is the nearest railway station (2 km). Tahli and Shekhan Khurd are the surrounding villages.

== History ==
The village is a part of an event of the Sikh history as the marriage party of the fifth Sikh guru, Guru Arjan Dev, stayed here for a while on their way back home, after married to Mata Ganga Ji.

== See also ==
- Sarinh, Ludhiana
- Buttar Sarinh
