= Behniwal =

Behniwal may refer to:

- Beniwal, a jatt clan of Punjab and surroundings
- Behniwal, Punjab, a village in Mansa district, Punjab
- Kokri Behniwal, a village in Moga district, Punjab
