= Butters =

Butters may refer to:

== Places ==
- United States
  - Butters, North Carolina, a census-designated place

== Other uses ==
- Butters (surname)
- Butters Stotch, a character from the animated sitcom South Park

== See also ==
- Buttar (disambiguation)
- Butter (disambiguation)
