= Butter (disambiguation) =

Butter is a dairy product made by churning fresh or fermented cream or milk.

Butter may also refer to:

- Butter (art fair), an annual art fair in Indianapolis
- Butter (novel), a 2017 novel by Asako Yuzuki
- Butter (surname)
- Butter Project, an online video-streaming platform
- Bhuttar, Pakistan, also spelled Butter, a village

== Films ==
- Butter (1998 film), an action film
- Butter (2011 film), an ensemble comedy directed by Jim Field Smith
- Butter (2020 film), a drama film starring Mira Sorvino

== Music ==
- We Butter the Bread with Butter, German metalcore band
- Butter 08, American alternative rock band
  - Butter (Butter 08 album), 1996
- Butter (Hudson Mohawke album), 2009

=== Songs ===
- "Butter" (song), by BTS, 2021
- "Butter", by A Tribe Called Quest, from the 1991 album The Low End Theory
- "Butter", by the Bloody Beetroots, 2008
- "Butter", by Triple One, 2019

== See also ==
- Butters (disambiguation)
- Butter catfish (disambiguation)
- Butterbar (disambiguation)
- Buttar (disambiguation)
- Butterfly (disambiguation)
- Buttery (disambiguation)
- Butter-and-eggs (disambiguation)
- Hyena butter
- Fruit butter
- Nut butter
