= Butter (surname) =

Butter is the surname of the following people

- Anton Julius Butter (1920–1989), Dutch economist
- John Butter (1791–1877), English ophthalmic surgeon
- Michel Butter (born 1985), Dutch runner
- Nathaniel Butter (died 1664), London publisher
- Wes Butters (born 1979), British radio broadcaster

== See also ==
- Buter
- Butters (surname)
