= Kirto =

Kirto
Geography	In Sheikhupura District, Punjab, Pakistan
Religion	Islam
Languages	Punjabi
Surnames:	Buttar

Kirto is a village in Sheikhupura District, Punjab, Pakistan. It is on the Narowal-Mureedike road, 54 km from Lahore. It is dominated by the Jat clan of Buttar.
