= Tom Butters =

Tom Butters may refer to:

- Tom Butters (athletic director) (1938–2016), American college sports administrator and baseball pitcher
- Tom Butters (politician) (1925–2015), Canadian legislator

== See also ==
- Butters (surname)
