= Tetrakomia =

Town of ancient Bithynia

Coordinates: 40°30′52″N 29°28′28″E

Tetrakomia (Ancient Greek: Τετρακομία) was a town of ancient Bithynia.

Its site is located near Keramet in Asiatic Turkey.
