= Buttar Kalan, Gurdaspur =

Buttar Kalan
- Village
- Location in Punjab, India Buttar Kalan (India)
- Coordinates: 31°50′59.80″N 75°21′21.08″E
- Country: India
- State: Punjab
- District: Gurdaspur

Languages
  - Official: Punjabi
  - Regional: Punjabi
- Time zone: UTC+5:30 (IST)

Buttar Kalan is a village of Gurdaspur district in Punjab, India "Kalan" is Persian language word which means "big". It is located in the Qadian sub-tehsil of the district.

== Culture ==
Punjabi is the primary language of the village, predominated by the Jatt people of Buttar clan.

== See also ==
- Buttar, the Jatt clan
- Buttar Kalan, Moga
- Buttar Sarinh
- Aasa Buttar
