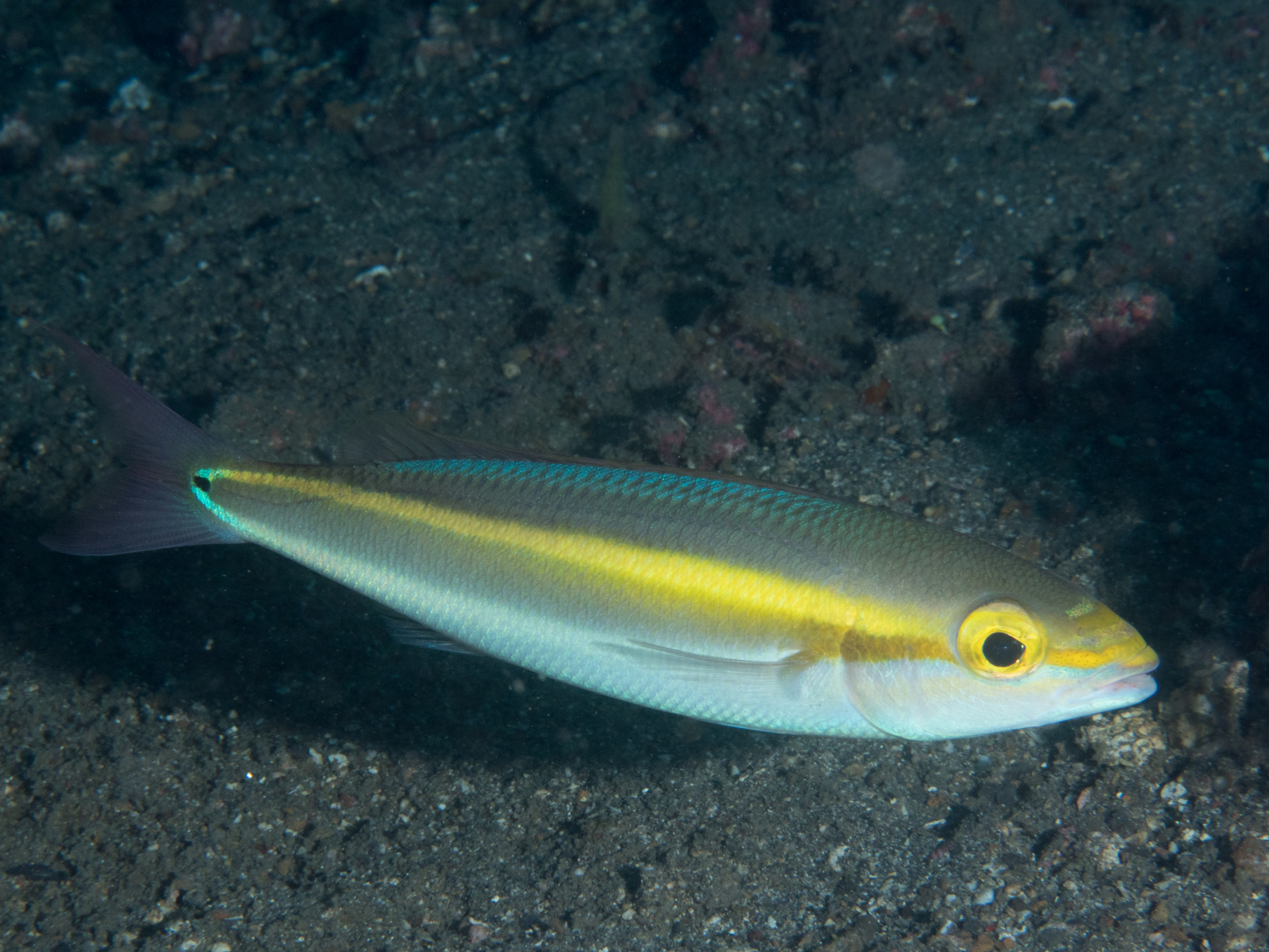

Conservation status
- Least Concern (IUCN 3.1)

Scientific classification
- Kingdom: Animalia
- Phylum: Chordata
- Class: Actinopterygii
- Order: Acanthuriformes
- Family: Nemipteridae
- Genus: Pentapodus
- Species: P. setosus

Binomial name
- Pentapodus setosus (Valenciennes, 1830)

Synonyms
- Pentapus setosus Valenciennes, 1830; Dentex filiformis Seale, 1910

= Pentapodus setosus =

Species of fish

Pentapodus setosus, the butterfly whiptail, is a species of marine ray-finned fish belonging to the family Nemipteridae, the threadfin breams. This fish is found in the Western Central Pacific Ocean.

== Taxonomy ==
Pentapodus setosus was first formally described as Pentapus setosus in 1830 by the French zoologist Achille Valenciennes with its type locality given as Jakarta on Java. The 5th edition of Fishes of the World classifies the genus Pentapodus within the family Nemipteridae which it places in the order Spariformes.

== Etymology ==
Pentapodus setosus has the specific name setosus which means "hairy", this is presumed to be a reference to the long, hair-like filament extending from the upper lobe of the caudal fin.

== Description ==
Pentapodus setosus has its dorsal fin supported by 10 spines and 9 soft rays while the anal fin is supported by 3 spines and 7 soft rays. The scales on the head extend forward to a level between the front of the eyes and the rear nostrils.The suborbital is not scaled and neither is the lower limb of the preoperculum. The short pelvic fins do not reach the level of the anus. The caudal fin is forked with the upper lobe extending into a long hair-like filament. The back is light brownish and the lower part of the body is whitish> there is a blue stripe running the length of the dorsal fin base, a yellow stripe running from behind eye, curving gently on the back and ending with a black spot on the upper caudal peduncle and has a thin blue strip within it which, at the rear of the black spot, joins with another blue stripe running from the anal fin origin. There are two bluish stripes over the snout which has a dusky upper part. The caudal fin is pinkish with the extended filament being pinkish brown. This species has a maximum published total length of 18 cm (7.1 in) although 15 cm (5.9 in) standard length is more typical.

== Distribution and habitat ==
Pentapodus setosus is found in the western central Pacific Ocean where its range extends from the Philippines and the southern South China Sea eastwards into the Gulf of Thailand and south to Timor. It has been recorded from southern Vietnam, Hainan in China), Malaysia, Singapore, Sumatra, Papua, Anambas Islands and Brunei. Its habitat varies from silty bays on the coasts to deep muddy offshore areas, frequently seen swimming in open areas close to reefs.

== Biology ==
Pentapodus setosus is typically found in small aggregations. These may often follow bottom feeding species, such as stingrays, and catch any prey that the larger predator disturbs. They feed mainly on small crustaceans.

== Fisheries ==
Pentapodus setosus is taken in large numbers as bycatch in trawl fisheries, as well as being caught in bamboo stake fish traps. However, it is not valued as a food fish and commands a low price so no fishery specifically targets this species. The catch is used to make fish meal, is fried or used as duck food.
