= John Buttery =

British businessman

John Buttery (1830 – 29 November 1912) was a merchant operating in the Straits Settlements of Penang, Malacca and Singapore. He was, at the time of his death, the senior partner of Sandilands, Buttery & Co. (Penang and Singapore), and John Buttery & Co. (London, transferred from Glasgow in 1875).

It is uncertain exactly when John Buttery arrived in Straits Settlements or when he left, but his coming may have had to do with Walter Scott Lorrain, whose signature he (or his father) stood witness for, in Glasgow, when Lorrain gave notice of withdrawing from his partnership in Brown & Co., Penang, on 6 November 1847.

== James Scott and David Brown, 1800–1808 ==
Brown & Co. was established by David Brown, a qualified lawyer from Longformacus (Berwickshire, Scotland) who, when he arrived in Penang in 1800, helped sort out the financial problems plaguing the spice business of James Scott, Francis Light's former partner, who had overextended himself. And while Brown managed to extricate Scott from his situation, it wasn't long before Scott overextended himself again. Scott died a bankrupt in 1808 and Brown acquired much of Scott's property and set himself up as a planter. Brown died in 1825.

== Walter Scott Lorrain, 1834–1836 ==
In 1834 Walter Scott Lorrain was in the employ of Douglas, Mackenzie & Co. of Singapore, as manager. He applied for land at Sandy Point to form docks, soon after someone else had applied for land at 'Blakan Mati,' for the same purpose. Later, he joined Brown & Co., Penang, as partner. At the end of 1836, together with James Stephen, he served, in Singapore, as attorney to Elizabeth Poynton, the administratrix to the estate of John Poynton (deceased).

== John Buttery's Origins, 1829–1852 ==
John Buttery was born either in 1829, as suggested by the notice published at the time of his death, or 1831, according to the research of Mackintosh Architecture (Univ. of Glasgow). He was the son of John Buttery Sr. (c1766–1842) who, together with his brother A.W. (c1815–1877), successively owned the Monkland Iron and Steel Company. His father-in-law was Alexander Kay of Cornhill house, Biggar. If it was John Buttery Jr. who witnessed Lorrain's signature, and not John Buttery Sr., this would have meant he would have been either 18 years or 15 years of age at the time he witnessed the signature. If it was, indeed the same Buttery who would go on to join Lorrain as a partner in Lorrain-Sandilands later on, then it is more likely for him to have been born in 1829 rather than 1831. These dates and sequence of events also suggest his arrival at the Straits Settlements would have been after, rather than before, 1847, and it is possible that Lorrain, then well established in business after his experiences at Douglas, Mackenzie & Co. of Singapore, and Brown & Co. of Penang, sent for Buttery to join him at Lorrain-Sandilands. There is an entry in Allen's Indian Mail, showing that a J. Buttery, together with a "Dr. Lorain" (possibly a typographical error for what might have been "Mr. Lorrain") departed Southampton for Penang on 20 February 1852.

== Grand Jury, Penang, 1853 ==
According to an entry in The Straits Times, Buttery was a member of the Grand Jury in 1853. Under the foremanship of Stuart Herriot, he served alongside other prominent members of Penang like John Rodyk, Henry Smith, George Combe, Alexander Ramsay Clarke, Andrew Creem James MacLaine Fraser, Samuel Nicholson Greene, William Charles Spencer Padday, Charles Stevens, William Taylor, Charles Le Bouche De Lisle, James Lamb, Michel Jules Moniot, George Scott, Alexander Stuart Brown, Thomas Ferrao, Duncan Clerk Presgrave, Walter Scott, and George Evans Lidiard Dawson. Together, they considered cases placed before them from the island and Province Wellesley.

== Expansion to Singapore, 1856–1858 ==
By 1856 Lorraine, Sandilands & Co. was transacting business in Singapore. In 1858, John Buttery was in charge of Singapore, Sandilands was in charge of Penang and Lorrain was in Glasgow. Buttery is likely to have been 29 at the time. The entry in Allens Indian Mail (1852), The Straits Times (1853), coupled with the subsequent geographic expansion of Lorrain, Sandilands & Co.'s sphere of business operations, and the plans that Lorrain had for himself, together, suggest that Lorrain had, indeed, brought Buttery over in 1852. Buttery is recorded as having departed the Straits Settlements for Europe towards the end of 1859.

== Departure of Walter Scott Lorrain, 1863 ==
The partnership went on well for just over ten years and then something happened, possibly a disagreement over the direction the business of the firm was to take. This partnership involving Lorrain, Sandilands and Buttery was dissolved on 12 February 1863. Lorrain, still in Glasgow, established a new business, Lorrain, Gillespie & Co., together with Walter Gillespie, William Lorrain Hill (W. S. Lorrain died less than ten years later in 1871). Buttery, too, was in Glasgow at the time when he signed the instrument of dissolution as himself and as attorney for Sandilands who was handling the liquidation at Penang. Alexander Allan was appointed to manage the liquidation at Singapore. And Sandilands and Buttery admitted John Allan as their new partner. By 1874 James Gibson and Arthur George Wright had been added as partners. Lorrain, Sandilands & Co. was no more and Sandiland's and Buttery's new partnership operated under the names, Sandilands, Buttery & Co., and John Buttery & Co. His name became part of the firm's name upon the departure of Lorrain and not upon his entry into the partnership as some believe – he was already a partner of Lorrain Sandilands before it was dissolved.

== Formation of Straits Settlements Association (Penang), 1868 ==
On 25 April 1868, John Buttery joined other British members of Penang's mercantile community in the formation of the Penang chapter of the Straits Settlements Association, which had already been formed in Singapore, and, more importantly, in London. Just two months after, his son was born.

== Birth of his sons, 1868–1875 ==
After the birth of his son, John Alexander Buttery, on 22 June 1868, in Penang, John Buttery returned to Britain. Two years later his son, Alexander Kay Buttery was born in Glasgow on 10 March 1870. John Alexander Buttery would grow up to be a successful engineer with his own business in Britain while his younger brother, Alexander Kay Buttery, would eventually return to Penang in 1894, and run the business there following the death of John Allan. He was listed in the Post Office Glasgow Directory for 1872 as, "Buttery, John (of John Buttery & Co.), house, 12 Kew Terrace." John Buttery & Co. in Glasgow moved to London in 1875.

== The Penang Association and the Prye River Docks, 1878 ==
John Buttery was back in the Straits Settlements by 1878. He attended a meeting of the Penang Association, of which he was a member, in May. His contemporaries in The Association at that time included, among others, James Montague Bent Vermont, L. C. Brown, R. Klunder, V. Krieger, C. C. Wiget, A. C. Padday, P. J. C. Rosa, W. S. Peterbridge, J. A.Anthony, D. Comrie, W. Allen, M. A. Anthoony, Shaik Eusoof, W. A. Main, Hon. Walter Scott, David Brown, W. L. Hill and Foo Tye Sin. In May 1878 The Association met to discuss, among other things, the levying of tools at the "Sunghy Rambie" bridge, and the state of Penang's finances. On 12 July he attended the opening of the Prye River Docks in Penang where he received a toast from James Montague Bent Vermont, which Buttery returned on behalf of the mercantile community there, remarking the benefits that the new Prye River Docks would bring to Penang's port, and help extend and develop shipping there.

== Sandilands, Buttery & Co., and the Penang Land Reclamation Scheme, 1880–1883 ==
We know Buttery was still in the Straits in 1880 from a comment made by W. G. Gulland, during the 20 August session of the Legislative Council. Gulland had brought up the matter of the purchase of Sandilands, Buttery & Co.s land in Penang that Government had recently bought, and was arguing that the $185,000 paid had been too high, and that the Secretary of State ought not to have bypassed the Council in executing the purchase. He said that Buttery, when he was in Penang three years earlier, could not find a buyer for $100,000. The firm had originally purchased the land for $20,000 to $23,000 and, with the buildings on them, could not be worth more than $40,000, he said, citing Sandilands' own words, spoken publicly. The Colonial Secretary replied that if the land were meant solely for the construction of Government buildings, as suggested by Gulland, then the Government would not have bought the property. This, was not the case. The land had been bought to improve the town – the construction of a jetty, and for the approaches from the jetty to the town. Government buildings would, indeed be built, but it was intended to sell a part of or the whole of it, and the cost of this purchase would be recouped from the proceeds of that sale. The Colonial Secretary went on to explain the methodical approach adopted in arriving at the price they felt was appropriate. Several others spoke and the Council ended, divided on the matter.

== Sir Frederick Weld's Dinner, 1884 ==
In November 1884 he was present at a dinner in Singapore thrown for Governor Sir Frederick A. Weld, at which occasion was also present Admiral Sir Henry Keppel, former Governor Sir William Orfeur Cavenagh, former Governor Sir Harry St. George Ord, former Governor Sir William Cleaver Francis Robinson, Chief Justice Sir Thomas Sidgreaves, Rajah Brooke of Sarawak, Perak's British Resident Sir Hugh Low, former Colonial Secretary Sir John Douglas, and former Attorney-General Thomas Braddell, among others. As was common with men of his standing, Buttery attended the important social events of his time. These allowed him to network and deal directly with people "at the top" in an informal, unofficial manner.

== The Straits Settlements Benevolent Association and its fund, 1884 ==
He was in London too, in 1884. It has been recorded that the Seniors in London of several of the old Straits Merchants Firms foresaw the necessity of establishing a fund, the object of which was to assist the dependents of former members of the Straits mercantile community who might find themselves stranded upon the loss of their loved ones. The signatories to the original Trust Fund were Edward Boustead, W. W. Shaw, Jasper Young, Thomas Cuthbertson (of Edward Boustead & Co.), William Adamson (of Adamson, Gilfilan & Co.) and John Buttery (of John Buttery & Co.). The association formed was to be known as The Straits Settlements Benevolent and its fund, The Straits Settlements Benevolent, accordingly.

== Sultan of Johore's farewell in London, 1866 ==
Buttery was in Britain in 1886. The Straits Times reported him attending the Sultan of Johore's farewell banquet, rubbing shoulders with the likes of Sir Rutherford Alcock and former Governor Cavenagh.

== Death of G. M. Sandilands, 1887 ==
George Macfarlane Sandilands died towards the end of 1887. but the firm continued to be known as Sandilands, Buttery & Co. in the Straits Settlements.

== London, 1890 ==
John Buttery was in England in 1890, evidenced by news reports of activities that mention his name. In the early part of the year he joined together with W. H. M. Read, J. Guthrie, M. F. Davidson, C. A. Rigg, W. McTaggart, H. M. Simons, J. M. Little, M. Little, J. Young, W. W. Shaw and William Paterson, as original subscribers to Singapore's Town Hall Building Fund, to protest Colonel Dunlop's seizure of the Town Hall building from Singapore's community, and the subsequent changing of its name from "Town Hall" to "Municipal Buildings." In the middle of the year he attended the Annual Straits Settlements Dinner in London. Regular attendance at these functions allowed him to network and keep a finger on the pulse of things back in the Penang and Singapore.

== The Silver Problem and the Straits Settlements Currency, 1893 ==
On 3 July 1893 he attended a meeting of the Straits Settlements Association held at the offices of the Tanjong Pagar Dock Company at Whittington Avenue, London E.C., to consider the question of silver and the currency of the Straits Settlements. After the meeting The Association was invited by the Colonial Office to give evidence before Lord Herschell's Committee on the Indian Currency, in an inquiry "into the question whether any action should be taken by the Indian Government in closing the mints against free coinage of silver." Through meetings such as this, Buttery continued to exert influence over the policies to be adopted in the Straits Settlements, and by extension, the Malay States under British protection at that time.

== The Military Contribution issue, 1894 ==
John Buttery was in England at the beginning of 1894. He is reported to have attended a meeting of the Straits Settlements Association in London, on 11 January.

== Death of John Allan, 1894 ==
John Allan died on 28 September 1894. It is possible that James Gibson had already been in charge and running things since 1893 – Gazette notifications show him appointed to the Municipal Commission whose members were usually nominated by important firms to represent their interests there. Nevertheless, with two partners gone, Sandilands in 1880 and Allan in 1894, it was clear that new blood was required. On 5 October 1894, John Buttery and wife, set off from London, on the Caledonia, heading for Penang.<refThe Singapore Free Press and Mercantile Advertiser (1884–1942) 11 Sep. 1894: 3. Print.</ref> Buttery and his wife are reported to have stayed at the Residency in Kuala Lumpur, towards the end of February 1895. Shortly after, on 3 March 1895, John Buttery and wife departed Penang aboard the Ganges, headed for Hong Kong. It is uncertain but it would make sense that he had brought his son, Alexander Kay Buttery, over with him at that time, and if he did, his son would have been around 24 years of age.

== Admittance of new partners – Daniel Gilchrist Junior and Alexander Kay Buttery, 1899 ==
In 1899, on 1 January, two new partners were admitted to the business. Daniel Gilchrist Junior, and Buttery's son, Alexander Kay Butter, now 29 years old. By the second quarter, a new Mrs. Buttery had joined the family when Alexander Kay Buttery married Ethel Mary Horne. They had a child a few years later.

== Death ==
He was once Chairman of Larut Tin Mining Company Limited, and had long-time interests in the Tanjong Pagar Dock Company. By 1908 his firm's business was varied and diversified. Its imports ranged from "cotton goods, iron ware and machinery to wines and spirits." It represented estates in Batu Puteh (Kedah) and the Alma Estate (Province Wellesley) whose flake tapioca it exported. It dealt in spices and traded in rubber, and sent tobacco from Sumatra to its brokers in Amsterdam for sale. It shipped tin all over the world and consigned Province Wellesley sugar to England and Scotland for refining. It held agencies for the National Bank of China, Ltd., National Bank of India Ltd., Clan line of steamers, Ben line, Union line, Mogul line, Warrack line, Pacific Mail Steamship Company, Occidental and Oriental Steamship Company, Toyo, Kisen, Kaisha, Portland and Asiatic Steamship Company, Lloyd's, Liverpool Underwriters Association, Glasgow; Underwriting Association, London; Imperial Fire Office, Norwich Union Fire Insurance Company, Commercial Union Insurance Company, Ltd., Liverpool and London and Globe Insurance Company, Standard Life Assurance Company, Merchants' Marine Insurance Company Ltd., Union Insurance Company of Canton Ltd., Yangtze insurance Association Ltd., City of Glasgow Life Assurance Company, Globe Marine Insurance Company, World's Marine Insurance Company, Italia Soc. Asicurazioni, Paya Jambu Tobacco Estate, and Larut Tin Mining Company.

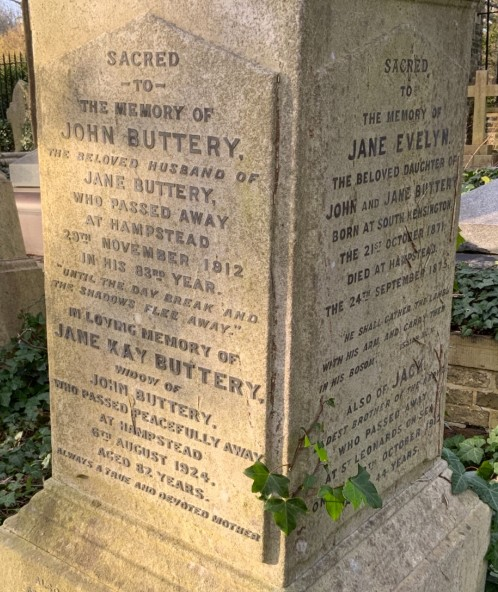
Grave of John Buttery in Highgate Cemetery

Allen and Donnithorne (2003), in describing John Buttery & Co. of Penang, which handled the estates, and Sandilands, Buttery & Co. of Singapore, which handled the mercantile business, wrote that Buttery's business, in just a few decades, "became associated with one of the earliest tobacco, planting and mercanting businesses on the east coast of Sumatra. It was also a pioneer in shipping rubber from Malaya."

John Buttery died on 29 October 1912 and was buried in Highgate Cemetery. He was by all estimations, a successful man. New partners were admitted but the firm kept its name. Buttery's name continued to survive for about another fifty years or so.
