= Cihanköy, Orhangazi =

Village in Turkey

Cihanköy
- Neighbourhood
- Location in Turkey Cihanköy (Marmara)
- Coordinates: 40°32′N 29°20′E
- Country: Turkey
- Province: Bursa
- District: Orhangazi
- Population (2022): 178
- Time zone: UTC+3 (TRT)

Cihanköy is a neighbourhood in the municipality and district of Orhangazi, Bursa Province in Turkey. Its population is 178 (2022).
