= Muhammad Javed Buttar =

Pakistani judge (born 1947)

Moin ud Din Javed Buttar
- Supreme Court of Pakistan building

Justice of the Supreme Court of Pakistan
- In office 31 July 2004 – 5 August 2009

Justice Lahore High Court
- In office 7 August 1994 – 30 July 2004

Personal details
- Born: 16 November 1947 (age 78) Pakistan

Supreme Court of Pakistan

Moin ud Din Javed Buttar (Urdu: محمد جاوید بٹر) was a former justice of the Supreme Court of Pakistan, retired on medical grounds.

== Early life ==
Javed Buttar was born on 16 November 1947 in Multan though belongs to Kirto a village of District Sheikhupura. He belongs to a Buttar Jatt family. His father, Haji Muhammad Anwar Buttar, was a Senior Advocate of Supreme Court of Pakistan.

== Siblings and Sons ==
Mr Javed Buttar is the oldest of total six siblings, he has two brothers and three sisters.

His brother Mr Pervaiz Buttar is a practicing solicitor in Sydney, Australia. He has lived in Australia since early eighties, and after academic career he has practised for over 30 years and still manages a successful law firm.

Third brother F. Jamshed Buttar is a retired lieutenant colonel from the prestigious Pakistan Army and is settled in Rawalpindi, Pakistan. His wife Rukhsana Jamshed Buttar was a member of the National Assembly of Pakistan and served as Federal Parliamentary Secretary for Petroleum and Natural Resources.

The oldest sister Gul Fatima lives in Lahore and the United States. Second Dr. Amna Buttar, lived in New York City and was a practicing physician at NYU Langone Medical Center. She has specialized in geriatrics. The youngest sister Dr. Aisha Buttar lives in North Carolina, is also a physician with specialty in pain medicine.

His two sons Saad and Asad, both barristers are also married to barristers and former is advocate Supreme practising in Islamabad and latter in Lahore High Court.

== Education and training ==
Mr Buttar graduated from Government College, Lahore in 1967. He passed his LL.B. in 1969 from Punjab University Law College, Lahore.

He, as a lawyer, attended conference in Manila on the "Conflict Resolution of Philippines". He also attended a Judicial Administration and Reform Course (JARC) in Sydney in the year 2002.

== Professional career ==
Buttar joined the legal profession in 1971, became a High Court advocate in 1974 and then an advocate of the Supreme Court in 1985. On 7 August 1994 he was made a judge of Lahore High Court and ten years later became a judge of the Supreme Court of Pakistan .

== Controversies ==
=== PCO 2007 ===
On 3 November 2007 Chief of Army Staff in Pakistan declared emergency and issued a Provisional Constitutional Order. A seven-member panel of Supreme Court of Pakistan, issued an order the declaration of emergency as illegal and prohibited all judges to take oath on any PCO. Justice Buttar was a sitting judge in Supreme Court of Pakistan choose to take the oath on PCO on 3 November 2007. He was one of the four Supreme Court judges from a total of 17, who took oath under the provisional constitution on 3 November 2007.

On 24 November 2007, a seven panel bench of newly constituted supreme court, after imposition of PCO, validated the imposition of emergency and the promulgation of the Provisional Constitutional Order issued by the Chief of the Army Staff. The bench was headed by Chief Justice Abdul Hameed Dogar.

Justice Buttar resigned and retired on grounds of health.

== Important cases ==
On 28 September 2007, M. Javed Buttar, along with Abdul Hameed Dogar, Javed Iqbal, Mohammad Nawaz Abbasi, Faqir Muhammad Khokhar, and Falak Sher formed a majority opinion in holding that petition challenging General Pervez Musharraf's candidature for the second term as the president as non-maintainable. Head of the bench Justice Rana Bhagwandas, with two other members Justice Sardar Muhammad Raza Khan and Justice Mian Shakirullah Jan dissented.
