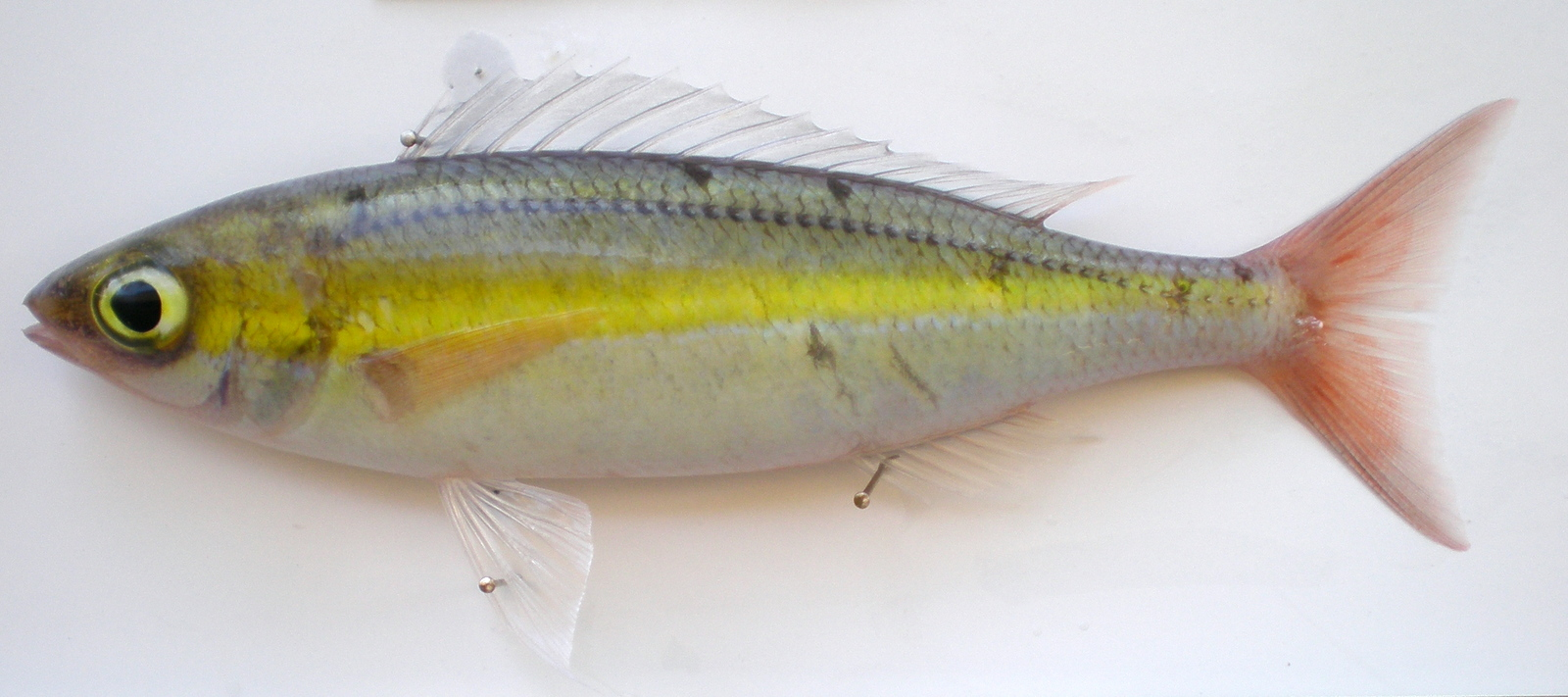
- Pentapodus aureofasciatus

Scientific classification
- Kingdom: Animalia
- Phylum: Chordata
- Class: Actinopterygii
- Order: Acanthuriformes
- Family: Nemipteridae
- Genus: Pentapodus; Quoy & Gaimard, 1824

Type species
- Pentapodus vitta Quoy & Gaimard, 1824

Synonyms
- Leiopsis Anonymous [E. T. Bennett], 1830; Pentapus Valenciennes, 1830; Maenoides J. Richardson, 1843; Heterodon Bleeker, 1845; Heterognathodon Bleeker, 1848; Leptoscolopsis S. Tanaka, 1915; Psilopentapodus Fowler, 1933; Parabodianus de Beaufort, 1940; Lunicauda Whitley, 1947

= Pentapodus =

Genus of fishes

Pentapodus is a genus of marine ray-finned fishes belonging to the family Nemipteridae, the threadfin breams. These fishes are found in the Indo-Pacific region.

== Taxonomy ==
Pentapodus was first proposed as a monospecific genus in 1824 by the French naturalists Jean René Constant Quoy and Joseph Paul Gaimard when they described Pentapodus vitta from Shark Bay in Western Australia. The 5th edition of Fishes of the World classifies the genus Pentapodus within the family Nemipteridae which it places in the order Spariformes.

== Etymology ==
Pentapodus is a combination of penta, meaning "five", and podus, which means "foot", what this was alluding to was not explained by Quoy and Gaimard. However, according to Valenciennes, who called the genus “Pentapus” in 1835, it was a reference to the three long, pointed scales, one above root of each of the pelvic and pectoral fins with a single one between these, giving the appearance of five ventral fins.

== Species ==
Pentapodus contains the following recognised species:

- Pentapodus aureofasciatus B. C. Russell, 2001 (yellowstripe threadfin bream)
- Pentapodus berryae G. R. Allen, Erdmann & Brooks, 2018 (Deep reef whiptail)
- Pentapodus bifasciatus (Bleeker, 1848) (white-shouldered whiptail)
- Pentapodus caninus (G. Cuvier, 1830) (small-toothed whiptail)
- Pentapodus emeryii (J. Richardson, 1843) (double whiptail)
- Pentapodus komodoensis G. R. Allen & Erdmann, 2012 (Komodo whiptail)
- Pentapodus nagasakiensis (S. Tanaka (I), 1915) (Japanese whiptail)
- Pentapodus numberii G. R. Allen & Erdmann, 2009 (Papuan whiptail)
- Pentapodus paradiseus (Günther, 1859) (paradise whiptail)
- Pentapodus porosus (Valenciennes, 1830) (Northwest Australian whiptail)
- Pentapodus setosus (Valenciennes, 1830) (butterfly whiptail)
- Pentapodus trivittatus (Bloch, 1791) (three-striped whiptail)
- Pentapodus vitta Quoy & Gaimard, 1824 (striped whiptail)

== Characteristics ==
Pentapodus fishes are separated from the other genera of Nemipteridae by the following characteristics. The body has a depth which fits into its standard length 3 to 3.5 times. The suborbital may be either scaly or naked with either having a weak spine or no spine. The rear margin of suborbital smooth, or has very small serrations and may have a small number of small denticulations. The rear edge of the preoperculum may have very small denticle or be smooth. The scales on the crown extend forward to or in beyond the centre of the eyes. The temples are scaly. There are 2 or 3 pairs of small canine-like teeth in the front of the upper jaw and a pair of larger, flared canine-like teeth on both sides of the lower jaw. The second spine in the anal fin is shorter and weaker than third spine. The smallest species is P. kmodoensis with a maximum published standard length of 10.4 cm (4.1 in) while the largest is P. emeryii which has a maximum published total length of 35 cm (14 in).

== Distribution ==
Pentapodus fishes are found un the eastern Indian Ocean and western Pacific Ocean.
