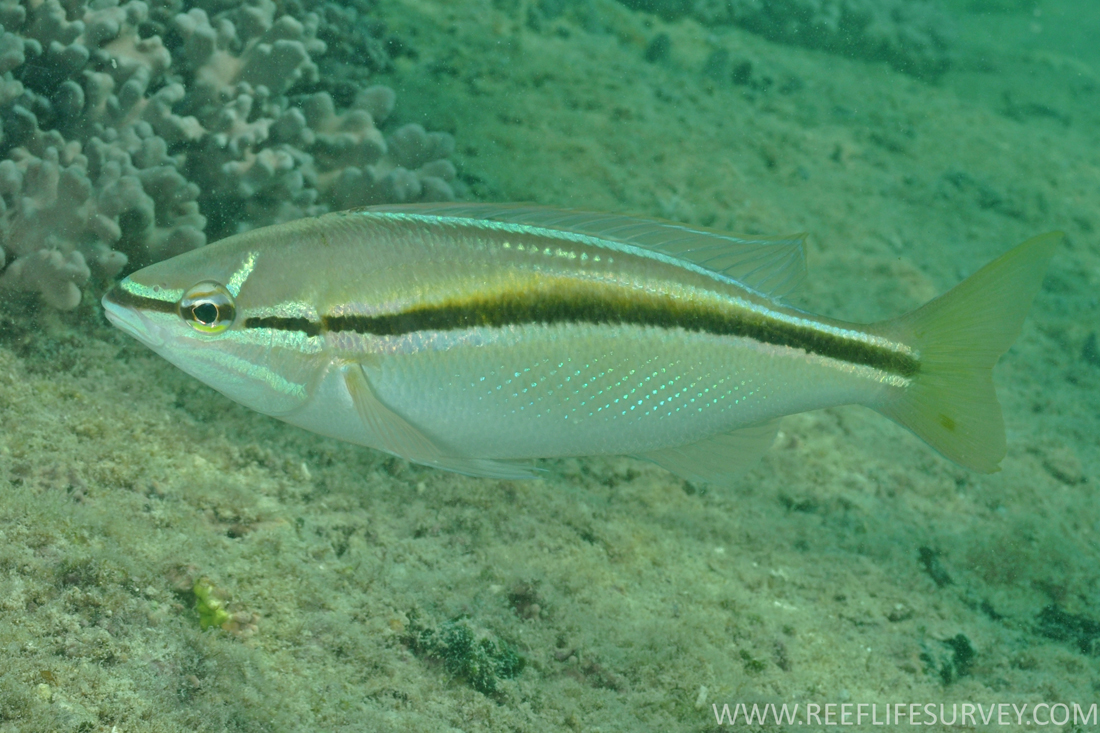
- Shark Bay, Western Australia

Conservation status
- Least Concern (IUCN 3.1)

Scientific classification
- Kingdom: Animalia
- Phylum: Chordata
- Class: Actinopterygii
- Order: Acanthuriformes
- Family: Nemipteridae
- Genus: Pentapodus
- Species: P. vitta

Binomial name
- Pentapodus vitta Quoy & Gaimard, 1824

Synonyms
- Scaevius vitta (Quoy & Gaimard, 1824); Pentapus peronii Valenciennes, 1830; Pentapus iris Valenciennes, 1830; Smaris porosus Richardson, 1846

= Pentapodus vitta =

Species of fish

Pentapodus vitta , the Western whiptail, Western butterfish, black stripe butterfish, striped whiptail or Western threadfin bream, is a species of marine ray-finned fish belonging to the family Nemipteridae, the threadfin breams. This fish is found in the Eastern Indian Ocean.

== Taxonomy ==
Pentapodus vitta was first formally described in 1824 by Jean René Constant Quoy and Joseph Paul Gaimard with its type locality given as Shark Bay in Western Australia. In describing this species Quoy and Gaimard proposed a new monospecific genus, Pentapodus, so this species is the type species of Pentapodus by monotypy. The 5th edition of Fishes of the World classifies the genus Pentapodus within the family Nemipteridae which it places in the order Spariformes.

== Etymology ==
Pentapodus vitta has the specific name vitta which means "stripe" or"band", an allusion to the brown lateral stripe.

== Description ==
Pentapodus vitta has its dorsal fin supported by 10 spines and 9 soft rays while the anal fin is supported by 3 spines and 7 soft rays. The scales on the head extend forward to a level immediately in front of or level with the rear nostrils. The scales between the nostrils are interrupted by a wedge shaped scaleless area. The suborbital is not scaled and neither is the lower limb of the preoperculum. The pelvic fins are moderately long extending to or nearly to the level of the anus. The caudal fin lobes are subequal in length and are pointed. The base colour of the body is silvery-white with a slender dark brown stripe, with turquoise margins, runs from over the eyes to the caudal peduncle; a second dark brown stripe runs from the tip of snout, through the eye and along the upper body, ending at the caudal peduncle; this stripe is wider as it approaches the tail and also has turquoise margins. The fins are transparent and the dorsal and anal fins have a thin, pale turquoise stripe just below their margins. This species has a maximum published total length of 26 cm (10 in) although 15 cm (5.9 in) standard length is more typical.

== Distribution and habitat ==
Pentapodus vitta is found in the eastern Indian Ocean off the coast of Western Australia where it ranges from the Dampier Archipelago to King George Sound. This is a benthopelagic species found over areas of sandy substrates next to rocky and coral reef areas, limestone outcrops, and seagrass beds. It has also been recorded in high numbers in recently dredged areas. Adults are typically found over sandy substrate near reefs while the juveniles are most frequent in shallow-water, seagrass beds In the winter they are found in shallower water nearest to the shore.

== Biology ==
Pentapodus vitta is a generalist predator, preying on benthic invertebrates and smaller fishes. The spawning season runs from October and February, peaking in November. This species has separate sexes and each individual will take part in spawning multiple times in the season. The maximum age known is 9 years.

== Fisheries ==
Pentapodus vitta is commonly taken as bycatch in fish and pawn trawl fisheries and it is targeted by recreational fishers, however, they earliest age most are caught is 3 years old so overfishing is unlikely as this is after the first age of sexual maturity.
