= Atkaracalar =

- Municipality
- Location in Turkey Atkaracalar (Turkey Central Anatolia)
- Coordinates: 40°49′N 33°04′E
- Country: Turkey
- Province: Çankırı
- District: Atkaracalar

Government
  - Mayor: Harun Oflaz (AKP)
- Elevation: 1,240 m (4,070 ft)
- Population (2021): 2,214
- Time zone: UTC+3 (TRT)
- Area code: 0376
- Website: www.atkaracalar.bel.tr

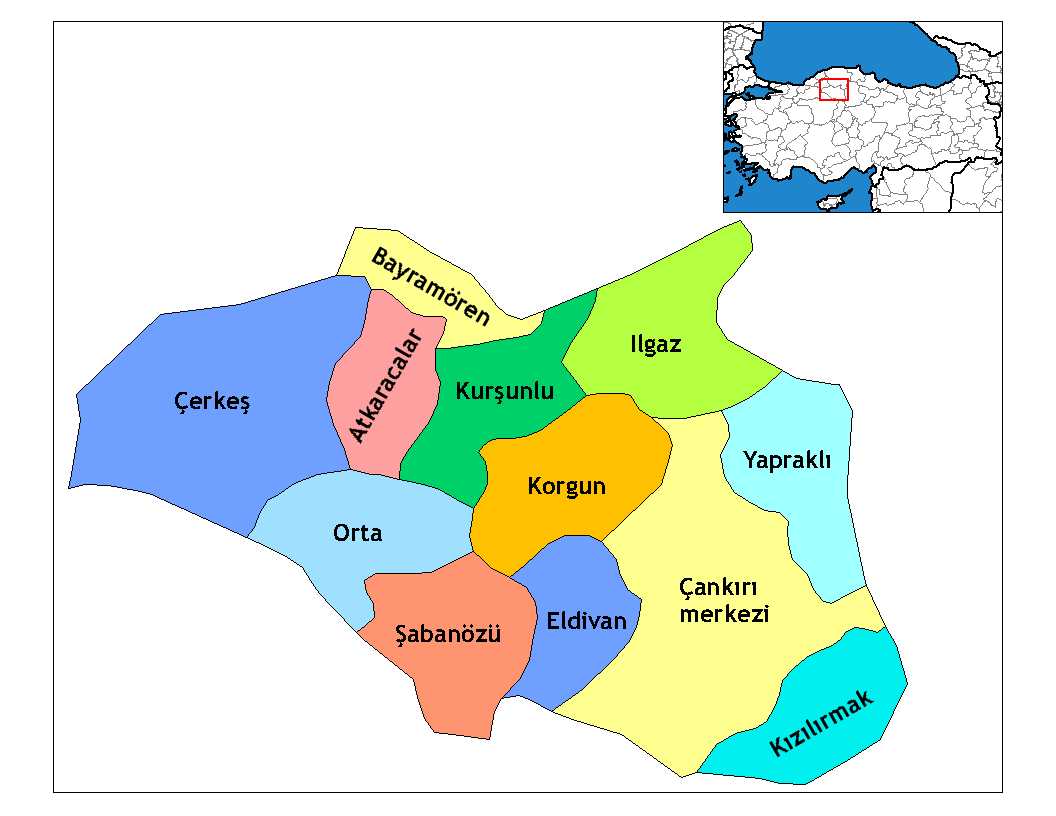
Map of the districts of Çankırı province in Turkey

Atkaracalar is a town in Çankırı Province in the Central Anatolia region of Turkey. It is the seat of Atkaracalar District. Its population is 2,214 (2021). The town consists of 6 quarters: Gazibey, Mollaosman, Kıran, Ilker, Hoca and Ilıpınar.

Atkaracalar is a typical Central Anatolian town, the inhabitants of Atkaracalar are primarily agricultural with barley, wheat, beans. And animal husbandry is most common in the district.
