= Yeniköy, Bursa =

Yeniköy
- Neighbourhood
- Location in Turkey Yeniköy (Marmara)
- Coordinates: 40°32′N 29°21′E
- Country: Turkey
- Province: Bursa
- District: Orhangazi
- Elevation: 270 m (890 ft)
- Population (2022): 2,769
- Time zone: UTC+3 (TRT)
- Postal code: 16825
- Area code: 0224

Yeniköy is a neighbourhood of the municipality and district of Orhangazi, Bursa Province, Turkey. Its population is 2,769 (2022). Before the 2013 reorganisation, it was a town (belde). It is situated to the north of Lake İznik. The distance to Orhangazi is 7 kilometres (4.3 mi) and to Bursa is 50 kilometres (31 mi). In 1963 Yeniköy was declared a seat of township. Table olive is the most important crop of the town. It was captured by the Greek Army in 1919 and its population was massacred and the village was burnt.
