= Butterbar =

Butter bar or butterbar may refer to:

- Second lieutenant, a junior commissioned officer rank in the US Army, Marines, Air Force, and Space Force
- Ensign (rank), a junior rank of a commissioned officer in the US Navy and Coast Guard
- Dessert bar, a type of confection

== See also ==
- Butter cookie, cookies consisting of butter, flour, and sugar
- Butterstick (disambiguation)
- Butter (disambiguation)
