= Buttrose =

Buttrose is a surname. Notable people with the surname include:

- Ita Buttrose (born 1942), Australian journalist and businesswoman
- Larry Buttrose (born 1952), Australian writer, journalist, and academic
- Murray Buttrose (1903–1987), Australian colonial judge
- Stroma Buttrose (1929–2020), Australian architect

== See also ==
- Butters (surname)
