= Buttar Sivia =

Buttar Sivia Butter Siviya
- Village
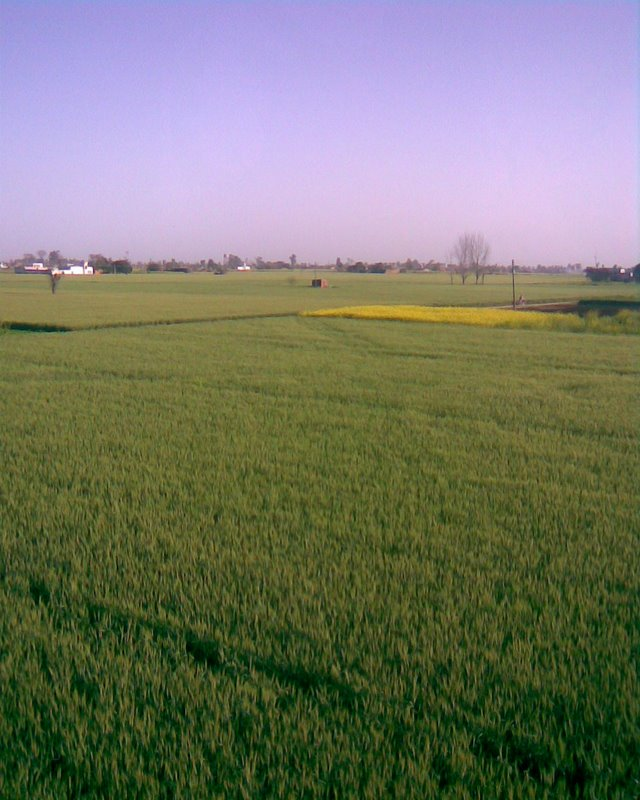
- View of Farms in Buttar Sivia, Amritsar

- Location in Punjab, India Buttar Sivia (India)
- Coordinates: 31.637°N 75.278°E
- Country: India
- State: Punjab
- Region: Punjab
- District: Amritsar
- Talukas: Baba Bakala

Government
  - Type: sarpanch

Population (2001)
  - Total: 5,623

Languages
  - Official: Punjabi (Gurmukhi)
  - Regional: Punjabi
- Time zone: UTC+5:30 (IST)
- PIN: 143205
- Vehicle registration: PB-02
- Nearest city: Batala
- Sex ratio: 1000/877 ♂/♀

Buttar Sivia, also known as Buttar Siviya, is a village in the Amritsar district of Punjab, India. It is predominantly inhabited by people of the Buttar, Siviya, and Randhawa Jat clans.

== Geography ==
Buttar Sivia is centered (approx.) at 31°38′13″N 75°16′41″E. It is located in the Baba Bakala tehsil of Amritsar district in Punjab, on the Beas-Batala road (National Highway 503D). The town of Mehta Chowk, headquarters of the orthodox Sikh educational and cultural organization Damdami Taksal, lies on the road from Amritsar, which is 41 km (25.47 mi) to Buttar's west. The city of Batala is 23 km (14.29 mi) to its north, Lahore (in Pakistan) is 97 km (60.27 mi) to the west and the Punjabi state capital of Chandigarh 203 km (126.14 mi) to the south-east.

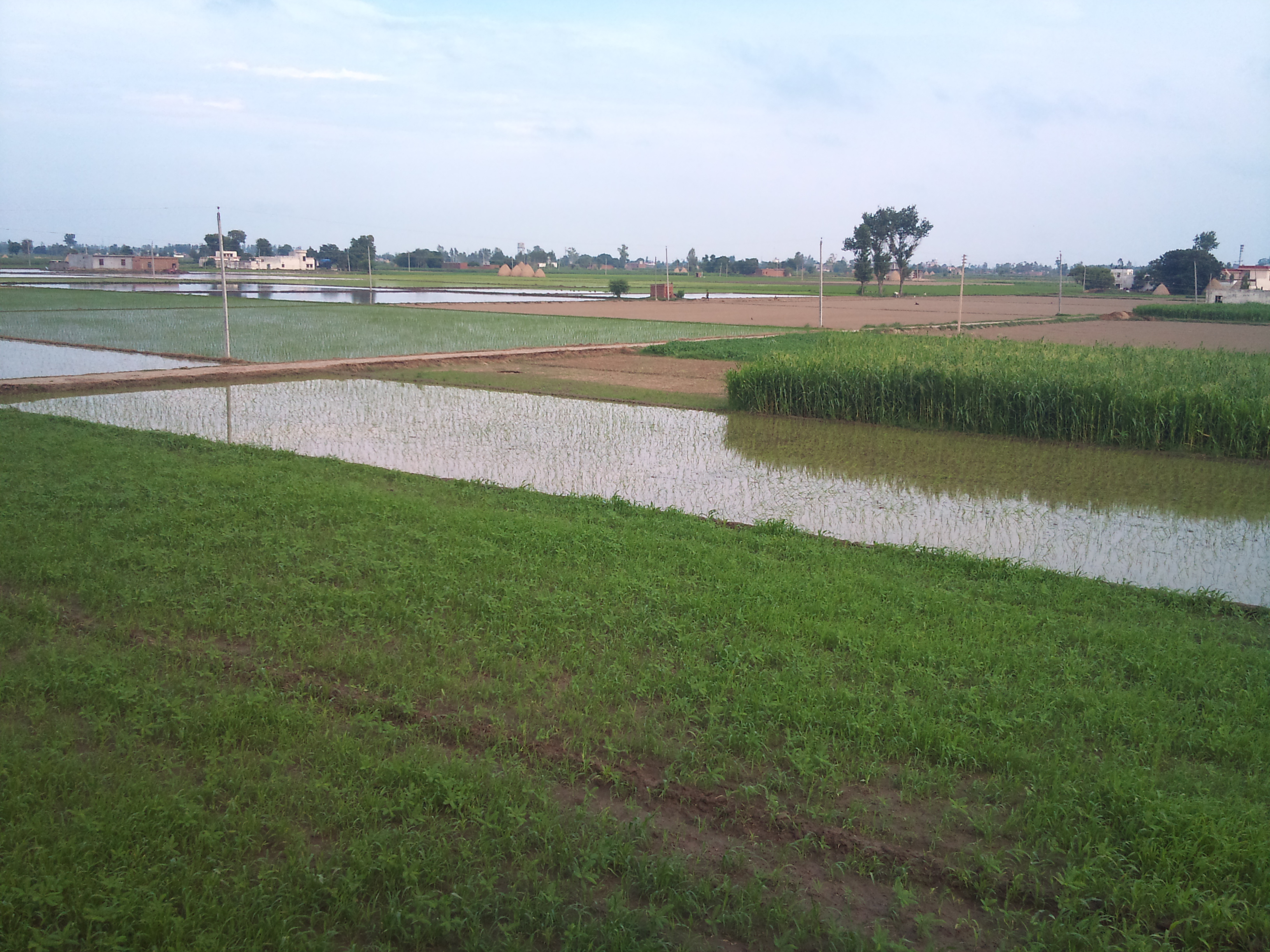
Pind buttar Sivia

== Demographics ==
In 2001, Buttar Sivia had a total population of 5,623 with 1000 households, 2,995 males and 2,628 females. Thus males constitutes 53% and females 47% of the total population with a sex ratio of 877 females per 1,000 males.

In 2011, Buttar Sivia had a total population of 6,701, with 3,509 males and 3,192 females, constituting a total of 1,312 households. Thus, males make up 52.37% and females 47.63% of the total population, with a sex ratio of 910 females per 1,000 males.

== Culture ==
Lohri is the most popular festival in the village. Punjabi is the official language.

== Economy ==
As is common in the region, the primary occupation is agriculture. A sugar refinery called Buttar Sugar Mill, on the outskirts of the village is one of the main employers.
