= Buiter =

Buiter is a surname. Notable people with the surname include:

- Harm Buiter (1922–2011), Dutch trade unionist and politician
- Willem Buiter (born 1949), Dutch-born American-British economist

== See also ==
- Buster (nickname)
- Buter
