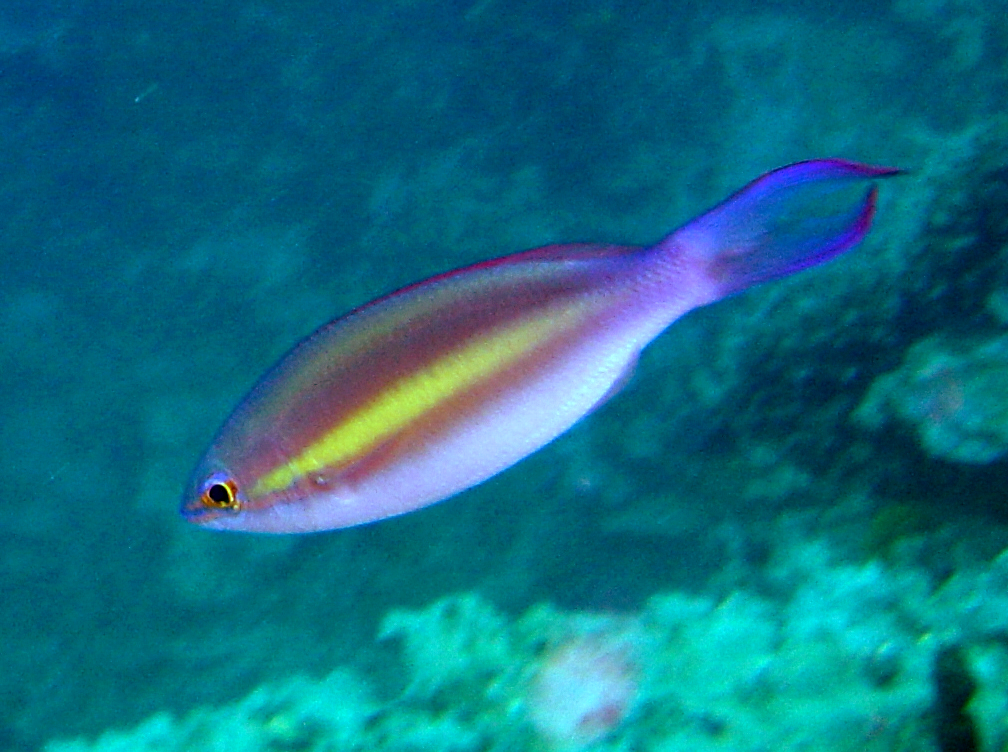

Conservation status
- Least Concern (IUCN 3.1)

Scientific classification
- Kingdom: Animalia
- Phylum: Chordata
- Class: Actinopterygii
- Order: Acanthuriformes
- Family: Nemipteridae
- Genus: Pentapodus
- Species: P. emeryii

Binomial name
- Pentapodus emeryii (Richardson, 1843)

Synonyms
- Mesoprion emeryii Richardson, 1843; Heterognathodon nemurus Bleeker, 1853; Pentapus nemurus (Bleeker, 1853)

= Pentapodus emeryii =

Species of fish

Pentapodus emeryii, the double whiptail, purple threadfin bream or blue whiptail, is a species of marine ray-finned fish belonging to the family Nemipteridae, the threadfin breams. This fish occurs in the eastern Indian Ocean and western Pacific Ocean.

== Taxonomy ==
Pentapodus emeryii was first formally described in 1843 by the Scottish naval surgeon, naturalist and Arctic explorer John Richardson with its type locality given as Barrow Island in Western Australia. The 5th edition of Fishes of the World classifies the genus Pentapodus within the family Nemipteridae which it places in the order Spariformes.

== Etymology ==
Pentapodus emeryii has a specific name which honours the artist, amateur naturalist and First Lieutenant aboard HMS Beagle during an 1837-1841 survey of the Australian coast, James Barker Emery. Emery drew illustrations of specimens collected on the expedition which were used in descriptions of new species, including of this species.

== Description ==
Pentapodus emeryii has its dorsal fin supported by 10 spines and 9 soft rays while the anal fin has 3 spines and 7 soft rays. The scales on the head extend as far as the rear nostrils. The suborbital is scaleless. The pelvic fins are moderately long, nearly extending as far as the anus. There is a wide yellow stripe from the tip of the pointed snout to the eye, where it divides into two thinner stripes, one running along the middle flank to the caudal peduncle, with an upper strip running from the eye to the rear end of the dorsal fin. The back is blue and the underside is white. The caudal fin is iridescent blue with the caudal fins of adults having long, trailing filaments from each lobe. This species has a maximum published total length of 35 cm (14 in) although 18 cm (7.1 in) standard length is more typical.

== Distribution and habitat ==
Pentapodus emeryii is found in the eastern Indian Ocean and western Pacific Ocean. It is found off northwestern Australia, in Indonesia, Malaysia, Papua New Guinea the Philippines. This species is found at depths between 2 and 35 m (6 ft 7 in and 114 ft 10 in) on clear coastal reef slopes.

== Biology ==
Pentapodus emeryii is a solitary species which may gather into small aggregations. It feeds on small fishes, crustaceans, brittle stars, and sipunculids.
