= Gemiç, Orhangazi =

Village in Turkey

Gemiç
- Neighbourhood
- Country: Turkey
- Province: Bursa
- District: Orhangazi
- Population (2022): 204
- Time zone: UTC+3 (TRT)

Gemiç is a neighbourhood in the municipality and district of Orhangazi, Bursa Province in Turkey. Its population is 204 (2022).
