= Buttran =

- village
- Location in Punjab, India Buttran (India)
- Coordinates: 31°33′01″N 75°34′48″E
- Country: India
- State: Punjab
- Region: Punjab
- District: Jalandhar
- Talukas: Bhogpur

Population (2001)
  - Total: 1,580

Languages
  - Official: Punjabi
  - Regional: Punjabi
- Time zone: UTC+5:30 (IST)
- PIN: 144622
- Nearest city: Jalandhar
- Sex ratio: 1000/910 ♂/♀

Buttran is a small village located in the Bhogpur tehsil of Jalandhar district in the Punjab, India. The village is dominated by the Jatts of Buttar clan.

== Demographics ==
In 2001, according to the census then, the village had a population of 1,580 with 295 households, 827 males and 753 females. Thus the males constitutes 52% and females 48% of the population with the sex ratio of 910 females per thousand males.

== Culture ==
The majority of the villagers belongs to the Buttar clan of Jatts. Punjabi is the mother tongue as well as the official language here.

=== Religion ===
Sikhism is the main religion followed by villagers, with a minority of Hindus. Gurudwaras located in the village are the main religious sites.
