= Muhammad Nawaz Abbasi =

Pakistani judge (born 1943)

Muhammad Nawaz Abbasi محمد نواز عباسی

Justice of the Supreme Court of Pakistan
- In office 10 January 2002 – 6 June 2008
- Nominated by: Pervez Musharraf

Justice of the Lahore High Court
- In office 28 August 1992 – 10 January 2002

Personal details
- Born: 7 June 1943 (age 83) Pakistan

Supreme Court of Pakistan

Mohammad Nawaz Abbasi (Urdu: محمد نواز عباسی) was a retired judge of the Supreme Court of Pakistan who previously served as a former justice of Lahore High Court.

== Life ==
Mohammad Nawaz Abbasi was born in Murree on 7 June 1943.

He received Secondary Education at Government High School, Murree and passed Secondary School Examination from Board of Intermediate and Secondary Education, Lahore in 1963. He graduated from University of Punjab in 1967 and did LL.B. from Punjab University Lahore (Session 1969–1971). He also has a diploma in labour laws from University Law College, Lahore in 1973 and a Shariah Course from International Islamic University, Islamabad in 1987. Abbasi died on 25 January 2023, in Islamabad.

== Professional career ==
Mr Abbasi joined the legal profession and enrolled as an Advocate of subordinate courts with Punjab Bar Council during 1972–73. He enrolled as Advocate High Court in 1975 and as Advocate Supreme Court of Pakistan in 1981.

He worked as a Special Prosecutor, in Court of Special Judge "Customs" Lahore, from 1983 to 1985. From March 1985 to August 1992, he worked as Assistant Advocate General, Punjab. He was a Prosecutor with Special Court for Speedy Trials established in the High Court and Supreme Appellate Court on behalf of Federal Government from 1987 to 1990. He has also conducted arbitration matters before the International Arbitration Tribunal in Germany.

He was a Member Disciplinary Committee, Quaid-i-Azam University.

Mr. Abbasi have also worked as visiting lecturer:

- Police Academy, Sihala (1987–88)
- Muslim Law College, Rawalpindi (1989–90)
- Customs Academy, Karachi (1990–91)
- Federal Judicial Academy, Islamabad.

Mr Abbasi was elevated as Judge of Lahore High Court on 28 August 1992.

He was a member of Administration Committee of Lahore High Court. During 2000–2001, he was Chairman of the Tribunal constituted under Anti-Terrorism Act, 1997. Mr Abbasi was a member of Syndicate Islamia University, Bahawalpur in 2001–2002.

Mr Abbasi was elevated as Judge Supreme Court of Pakistan on 10 January 2002.

He also has been Incharge Judge, Federal Judicial Academy in 2003 and Principal Secretary, Ministry of Law, Justice and Human Rights. He was Incharge, Access to Justice Programme of the Government of Pakistan and ex officio Member of Law & Justice Commission of Pakistan from 18 June 2003 to 14 June 2004.

Mohammad Nawaz Abbasi retired from Supreme Court of Pakistan on 7 June 2007 on reaching retirement age of 65.

Mohammad Nawaz Abbasi retired from Supreme Court of Pakistan. He was then appointed as Chief Judge of Supreme Appellate Court of Gilgit Baltistan.

== Oath taking years ==
=== Oath 1999 ===
Mr Abbasi as a sitting judge of Lahore High Court took oath in 1999.

=== Oath 2007 ===
On 3 November 2007, the Chief of the Army Staff declared emergency in Pakistan and issued a Provisional Constitutional Order (PCO).

As sitting judges of Supreme Court of Pakistan, Mr. Abbasi along with Mr. Abdul Hameed Dogar, Mr. M. Javed Buttar, and Mr. Faqir Muhammad Khokhar immediately took the oath on PCO.

On 7 June 2008 Justice Muhammad Nawaz Abbasi retired from Supreme court of Pakistan and in January 2009 he was appointed as Chief Judge Gilgit Baltistan until 15 January 2012.

== Important cases ==
=== Presidential Election 2007 ===
The candidature for second term of presidential election was directly challenged under the Article 184(3) of the Constitution and requirement of article 184(3) that unless a question unless a question of public importance relating to fundamental rights is involved, a direct petition before the Supreme Court is not maintainable. The matter relating to candidature of a person can be challenged in the high court under Article 199 of the constitution. As per majority view the petition seeking relief to restrain Gen. Pervez Musharraf from contesting elections was not maintainable because no fundamental right of the person who challenged the candidature was Involved. On 28 September 2007, Javed Iqbal along with Abdul Hameed Dogar, M. Javed Buttar, Muhammad Nawaz Abbasi, Faqir Muhammad Khokhar, and Falak Sher formed a majority opinion in holding that petition challenging General Pervez Musharraf candidature for the second term as the president as non-maintainable. The bench was headed by Justice Rana Bhagwandas, while two other members Justice Sardar Muhammad Raza Khan and Justice Mian Shakirullah Jan dissented。
