= Butterstick =

Butterstick may refer to:

- Butter, a dairy product
- Tai Shan (giant panda), a giant panda nicknamed Butterstick for his size at birth

== See also ==
- Butterbar (disambiguation)
