= Ajitwal =

Ajitwal Jittwal
- village
- Location in Punjab, India Ajitwal (India)
- Coordinates: 30.814°N 75.338°E
- Country: India
- State: Punjab
- District: Moga
- Talukas: Moga

Languages
  - Official: Punjabi (Gurmukhi)
  - Regional: Punjabi
- Time zone: UTC+5:30 (IST)
- PIN: 142053
- Nearest city: Moga
- Website: www.ajitwal.com

Ajiwal is a village, situated on the National Highway no. 95 (Ferozepur - Ludhiana road), in the tehsil and district of Moga in Eastern Punjab (India). It is 16 km away from Moga and 14 km away from Jagraon.

== History ==
The village was founded by a Muslim prince and his family; Ajit Khan.

The village was called as Jittwal during the rule of Maharaja Ranjit Singh. It is said to have been established by two brothers named Bhai Karam Chand & Bhai Sahib Chand. They were of very pious and saintly in nature. God gave them spiritual healing power. People started visiting them and paying respect. Once a caravan of Maharaja Ranjit Singh's relatives was passing when a lady fell ill. Since there was no Vaid/Hakim (English: Doctor) available, the sick lady was brought to Bhai Karam Chand. Bhai Karam Chand offered a Pircle of Jittwal earth and the lady recovered with this miracle. People started honoring and worship with the passage of the next generations of these two godly brothers were looked after very nicely by the people. In the last-years of 21st century a beautiful Gurudwara Sahib has been constructed in their memory at place where their Samadh was existing. Because of this Gurudwara Sahib has been named as Gurudawara Dera Baba Simadhan, people now worship at here. The next generation of baba Bhai Karam Chand & Sahib Chand is called by the name, "Bhai Ke".

A large population of this village consists of people belonging to the Maan clan of Jatts. The Maans are known as Bhai Ke. The other Jatt people of Sandhu and Sidhu clan can also be found in a substantial number with the Ghatoura clan of Ramgarhia caste and there are found caste like Ramdassia Sikh; Mazbi Sikh etc. as well as Muslim community. They are playing an important for the development of the village. Sandhu clan of Jatts and Ghatoura clan of Ramgaria migrated from nearby village, Kapoore. Dr. Gurmit Singh is the first person of the village to complete Ph.D. in faculty of Education from Panjab University, Chandigarh. He is also first person of the village to win Panjab University Senate Election for 3 consecutive term.
