= Shekhan Khurd =

- village
- Nickname: Shekhan
- Location in Punjab, India Shekhan Khurd (India)
- Coordinates: 31.122188°N 75.558450°E
- Country: India
- State: Punjab
- District: Jalandhar
- Talukas: Nakodar

Languages
  - Official: Punjabi
  - Regional: Punjabi
- Time zone: UTC+5:30 (IST)
- Telephone code: 01821
- Vehicle registration: PB- 08
- Nearest city: Nakodar

Shekhan Khurd is a small village in Nakodar. Nakodar is a tehsil in the city Jalandhar of Indian state of Punjab. Kalan is Persian language word which means Big and Khurd is Persian word which means small when two villages have same name then it is distinguished as Kalan means Big and Khurd means Small with Village Name.

== STD code ==
Shekhan Khurd's STD code is 01821.
