= Orhangazi =

- District and municipality
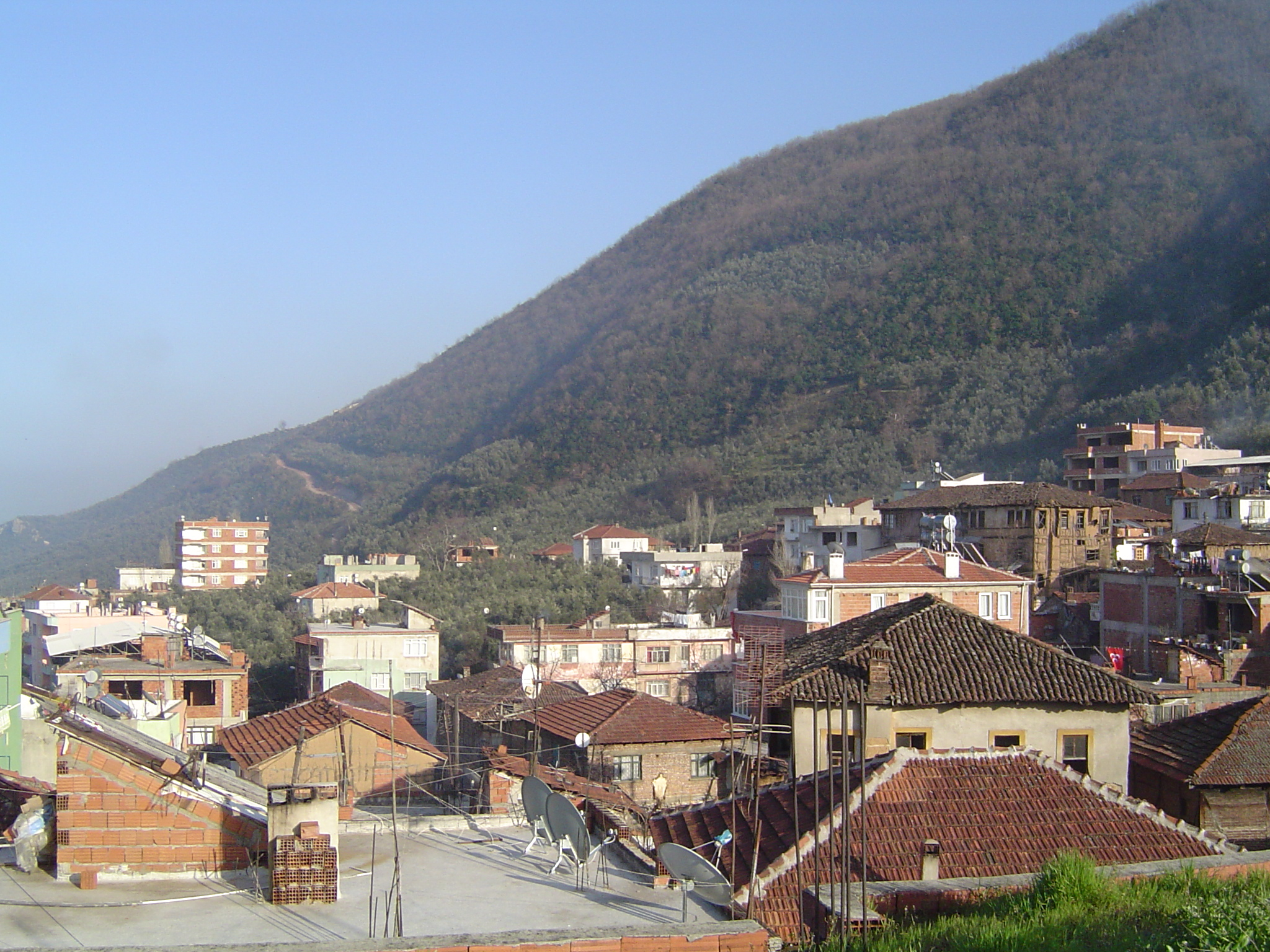

- Map showing Orhangazi District in Bursa Province

- Location within Turkey Location within Marmara
- Coordinates: 40°29′20″N 29°18′30″E
- Country: Turkey
- Province: Bursa

Government
  - Mayor: Bekir Aydın (AKP)
- Area: 506 km^{2} (195 sq mi)
- Population (2022): 81,110
  - Density: 160/km^{2} (415/sq mi)
- Time zone: UTC+3 (TRT)
- Postal code: 16800
- Area code: 0224
- Website: www.orhangazi.bel.tr

Orhangazi is a municipality and district of Bursa Province, Turkey. Its area is 506 km^{2}, and its population is 81,110 (2022).

Olive production is a major part of the economy. The archeological digs of Ilıpınar Mound are in the region of Orhangazi, and can be visited.

Orhangazi is located near the lake Iznik and near the Sea of Marmara. Orhangazi has a number of villages around it, connected with local buses. One of the villages, Keramet, has a natural hot springs. Main roads leading to the villages have olive fields on both sides.

== History ==
Orhangazi is named after Orhan I, the second sultan of the Ottoman Empire, who conquered the area of present Orhangazi in 1326. From 1867 until 1922, Orhangazi was part of Hüdavendigâr vilayet. The town was captured by the Greek Army in 1919 and its population was massacred.

== Composition ==
There are 31 neighbourhoods in Orhangazi District:

- Akharım
- Arapzade
- Bayırköy
- Çakırlı
- Camikebir
- Çeltikçi
- Cihanköy
- Dutluca
- Fatih
- Fındıklı
- Gedelek
- Gemiç
- Gölyaka
- Gürle
- Hamzalı
- Heceler
- Hürriyet
- Karsak
- Keramet
- Mahmudiye
- Muradiye
- Narlıca
- Örnekköy
- Ortaköy
- Paşapınar
- Sölöz
- Tekke
- Üreğil
- Yenigürle
- Yeniköy
- Yenisölöz

== Sport ==
The route of the 130k İznik Ultramarathon, established in 2012, passes through villages in Orhangazi district around Lake İznik. An 80k part of it, the Orhangazi Ultra, ends in Örnekköy in Orhangazi district on the route's westernmost point.
