= Ilıpınar Mound =

Archaeological mound in Bursa, Turkey

Ilıpınar Mound (Turkish: Ilıpınar Höyüğü) is an archaeological mound located in Orhangazi, Bursa Province, Turkey. It is located 2 km west of Lake Iznik.

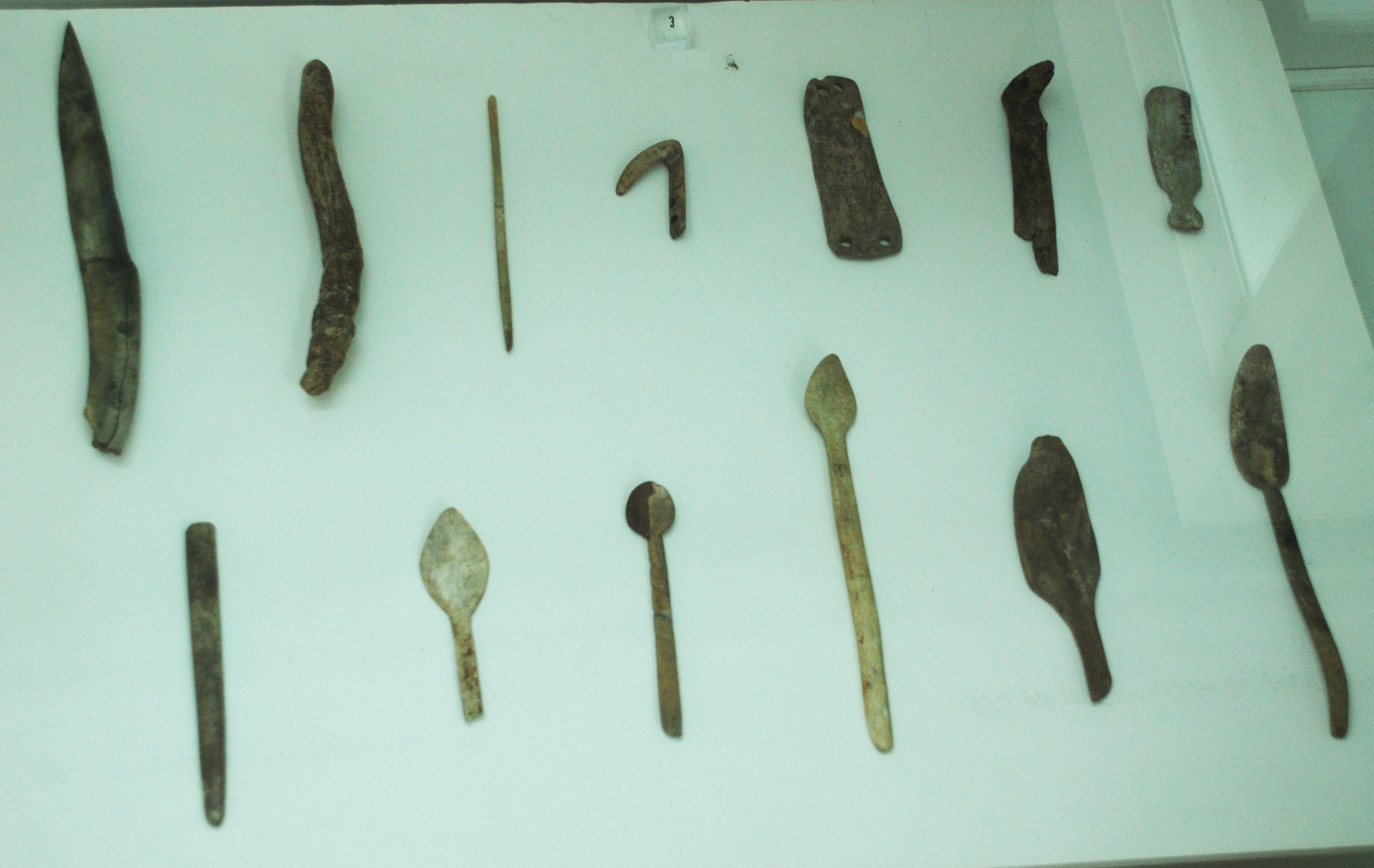
Ancient tools found in the Ilıpınar Mound. Iznik Museum.

A series of excavations suggests that the area had been inhabited intermittently since c. 6000 BC until the Byzantine period.

== Excavations ==
In 1987, excavations began at a mound in Ilıpınar, an old farming village located to the east of the Sea of Marmara. It was a part of an archaeological research project named the "Early farming communities in the Eastern Marmara Region" that was initiated under The Netherlands Institute for the Near East and was conducted under direction of Archaeologist Jacob Roodenberg. The excavations took place in the mound until 2002.
