= Stuart Herriot =

British merchant

Stuart Herriot (25 April 1812, in Swinton & Simprim, Berwickshire – 5 June 1877, in Penang, Malaysia) was a British-born trader based in Penang.

== Career ==
Herriot wrote a petition of Chung Keng Quee & 44 Others, street names and a book.

Stuart Herriot had been in partnership with a George Stuart, probably a relative of his mother, as Stuart & Company, merchants & agents. This must have failed. In 1850 the Court of Directors of the East India Company discharged Herriot's insolvency. The London Gazette Issue 21149 published on 1 November 1850. Page 3 of 30 carried the following notice:

East India-House, 30 October 1850.

THE Court of Directors of the East India I Company hereby give notice, that they have received a Calcutta Gazette, containing the undermentioned notice, filed in the Court for the Relief of Insolvent Debtors at Prince of Wales' Island, by Insolvent applying for his discharge, under the provisions of the 11th Victoria, cap. 21 :

Stuart Herriot, heretofore trading in copartnership, at Prince of Wales' Island, with one George Stuart (now residing in Europe), as merchants and agents, under the style and-firm of Stuart and Company. Date of Gazette containing a notice, September 4, 1850.

James C. Melvill, Secretary

He was a Penang municipal commissioner.

== Personal life ==
Stuart Herriot and Catherine Anthony (4 October 1804 in Penang – 4 October 1859 in Penang) were married in Penang, Malaya.
