= Arthur Buttery =

English footballer

Personal information
- Full name: Arthur Buttery
- Date of birth: 20 December 1908
- Place of birth: Hednesford, England
- Date of death: July 6, 1990 (aged 81)
- Place of death: Heath Hayes, Staffordshire, England
- Height: 5 ft 11 1/2 in (1.82 m)
- Position: Inside left

Youth career
- St. Peter's Church

Senior career*
Years	Team	Apps	(Gls)
- Hednesford Town
1929–1932	Wolverhampton Wanderers	10	(6)
1932–1937	Bury	104	(38)
1937–1938	Bradford City	35	(13)
1938–1939	Walsall	15	(4)
1939–19??	Bristol Rovers	3	(0)
- → Wolverhampton Wanderers (war guest)
- Stafford Rangers
Total		167	(61)
- * Club domestic league appearances and goals

Arthur Buttery (20 December 1908 – 6 July 1990) was an English professional footballer who played as an inside left. He scored 61 goals from 167 appearances in the Football League. He was nicknamed "The Gentleman."

== Career ==
Born in Hednesford, Buttery played for St. Peter's Church, Hednesford Town. His performance at Hednesford – 18 goals in seven games – was quickly noticed and he was signed to Wolverhampton Wanderers in 1929 for £450 (equivalent to £25,000 in 2025). He later played for Bury, Bradford City, Walsall, Bristol Rovers and Stafford Rangers. He joined Bradford City in January 1937, and left the club in June 1938. For them he made 35 appearances in the Football League, scoring 13 goals.

Buttery became a respected scout in his retirement, one of his recruits being English international Gerry Hitchens.

== Sources ==
- Frost, Terry (1988). Bradford City A Complete Record 1903–1988. Breedon Books Sport. ISBN 0-907969-38-0.
