= Buttar Kalan, Moga =

Buttar Kalan
- village
- Location in Punjab, India Buttar Kalan (India)
- Coordinates: 30.725°N 75.275°E
- Country: India
- State: Punjab
- District: Moga
- Established: Unknown but dated back to 1700
- Founder: Unknown but Dhillon and Bhullar and Bawa clan established.

Government
  - Type: Democratic Elections
  - Body: Gram panchayat

Population
  - Total: 10,519 per 2,011 census with 5,564 males and 4,955 female. 2,055 is the no. of families along with 5,210 no. of SC members with 6,556 literates in total making rate of almost 62.50%.

Languages
  - Official: Punjabi
  - Regional: Punjabi
- Time zone: UTC+5:30 (IST)
- Postal Code: 142040
- Area code: 01636
- Vehicle registration: PB29

Buttar Kalan is a village in the Moga district of East Punjab (India), located on the Moga-Barnala Highway 703. Buttar village is located in Moga tehsil of Moga district in Punjab, India. It is located 17 km from Moga, which is both district & sub-district headquarter of Buttar village. As per 2009 stats, Butter Khurd is the gram panchayat of Buttar village. Khurd and Kalan are Persian words meaning "small" and "big" respectively. When two villages have the same name, they are differentiated by adding "Khurd" or "Kalan" to their names to refer to their size relative to each other. The PIN code for the village is 142040, and village contains a post office.

== Administration ==
Buttar Kalan village is administrated by a sarpanch who is elected representative of the village. As of 2019, Buttar village comes under the Nihal Singh Wala assembly constituency and Faridkot parliamentary constituency. Moga is the nearest town to Buttar for all major economic activities. Currently due to the population size, Buttar village elects 2 sarpanchs for Dhillon patti and Bhullar patti.There are many famous names that come from this Village. A world renown Dermatologist Dr. Shaminder Dhillon belongs to this Village.

== Culture and People ==
Punjabi is the mother tongue as well as the official language of the village, predominated by the Jatt people of the Buttar village. Genetic studies conducted of this area confirm steady amounts of West Asian ancestry and detectable levels of Dravidian influences in the population. As in other parts of Punjab, skin color ranges from almost white to almost black in Buttar, however, the most common skin colors are medium brown and dark brown. Exposure to the sun accounts for the darker complexion of Jat farmworkers. As a rule, the hair color is almost always dark brown and frequently curly in texture, but traces of blondism in hair and eye color are present in small percentages. Most of the population is Sikh and Hindu, with few Muslim families. The village is also associated with several notable individuals. These include Dr. Shaminder Dhillon, a world renowned dermatologist known for his work in the field of skin health, and Gurinder Dhillon, a marine and mechanical engineer. Gagandeep Sra is another famous personality known for her dedication to community service. All of them are recognized for their professional contributions internationally.

== Religion ==
The village is currently predominated by the Sikhs, with Hindu and a very few Muslim families established in the village. Currently village have gurudwara, Hindu temples and mosques for the worshipers. Baisakhi is celebrated every year in the village and Baisakhi fair is celebrated for 3 days in April of every year.

== History ==
Buttar is in an area established during the Vedic times by Central Asian immigrants. It was home to a secondary school that attracted students from nearby villages. There are many political celebrities from this village. Buttar has steadily grown, but it split into two parts due to the Panchayati Department, and currently it is known by Dhillon Buttar, and Bhullar Buttar. Buttar has held tournaments every year for youngsters and other people. Three-fourths of the people from this village live abroad in places such as Canada, USA, and Australia.

== Education ==
Buttar currently has 2 government-run high schools established in the village during the British era. Both of the separate schools are boys and girls high school. Before independence, these schools were the only source of education for boys and girls.

== See also ==
- Buttar, the Jatt clan
- Buttar Kalan, Gurdaspur
- Buttar Sarinh
- Kokri Buttran
