= Buttrey =

Buttrey is a surname. Notable people with the surname include:

- Edward Buttrey (born 1965), American politician
- Gordon Buttrey (1926–2012), Canadian ice hockey player
- Kenny Buttrey (1945–2004), American drummer and music arranger
- Sam Buttrey (born 1961), American game-show contestant and podcaster
- Theodore V. Buttrey Jr. (1929–2018), American numismatist
- Ty Buttrey (born 1993), American baseball player

== See also ==
- Buttrey Food & Drug, defunct grocery store chain in Montana, United States
