= Buter =

Buter is a Dutch surname. Notable people with the surname include:

- Cobie Buter (born 1946), Dutch swimmer
- Jaimy Buter – Dutch footballer (born 2002)
- Piet Buter (born 1950), Dutch football coach
- Yvonne Buter (born 1959), Dutch field hockey player

== See also ==
- Buiter
