= Bayırköy, Orhangazi =

Village in Turkey

Bayırköy
- Neighbourhood
- Location in Turkey Bayırköy (Marmara)
- Coordinates: 40.3591°N 29.4189°E
- Country: Turkey
- Province: Bursa
- District: Orhangazi
- Population (2022): 104
- Time zone: UTC+3 (TRT)

Bayırköy is a neighbourhood in the municipality and district of Orhangazi, Bursa Province in Turkey. Its population is 104 (2022).
