= Butter catfish =

Butter catfish is a term for certain catfishes, which look similar but are not particularly closely related:

- Schilbe or butter catfishes, a genus native to Africa
  - African butter catfish (Schilbe mystus)
- Ompok bimaculatus or butter catfish, native to parts of Asia

== See also ==
- Butter (disambiguation)
