= Amna Buttar =

Pakistani geriatrician and politician

Member of Provincial Assembly of the Punjab
- Incumbent
- Assumed office 2008

Personal details
- Born: 1962 (age 63–64) Lahore, Pakistan
- Party: Pakistan Peoples Party
- Education: University of Michigan
- Occupation: Medical Doctor
- Website: Punjab Assembly Member Profile

Amna Buttar (born 1962) is a Pakistani American geriatrician, academic, and former politician. She served as a member of Provincial Assembly of the Punjab, Pakistan in 2008. She has worked as clinical associate professor of medicine and geriatrics at the NYU Langone Health.

== Early life and education ==
Born in a Buttar family in Lahore, Amna Buttar did her MBBS from Fatima Jinnah Medical College, Lahore, and went to United States. She did her internal medicine residency at the University of Wisconsin, and fellowship in Geriatrics from the University of Michigan. She also completed a master's degree in public health from the University of Michigan.

== Career ==
Buttar served as assistant professor of medicine and geriatrics at Indiana University and served as associate professor of the same discipline at University of Wisconsin. She was serving as director of geriatrics at Mount Sinai Hospital in Milwaukee, Wisconsin, when she moved to Pakistan in 2007. She has written numerous book chapters in multiple textbooks, and authored many research papers, including publications in prestigious journals like Annals of Internal Medicine, and the Journal of the American Medical Association. Buttar developed and implemented four different health care programs in three different states in the US. She is recipient of Career Award by the Department of Health and Human Services in the US, and served on advisory committee to the Secretary of Health and Human Services in the US.

During her stay in the US, she served in Association of Pakistani Physicians of North America as president/secretary of FJMC alumni. She is founder president of Asian-American Network Against Abuse of human rights (ANAA). She actively advocated for human and women rights and brought cases of Mukhtar Mai and Dr Shazia Khalid to limelight all across the globe.

She has been given LeadHer Award by the Girls Learn International in New York City in 2006. She has also received Human rights award from Pakistan Peoples Party human rights wing in August 2006. She has testified to the U.S. Congress, as well as representing Pakistan United Nations at the UN Commission on Status of Women.

Apart from numerous, social, charitable and welfare programs, she started a charitable program to help poor women lingering in Pakistani Prisons for a long time having no monetary and legal support. Her interviews have appeared in local and international print and electronic media, including CNN, MSNBC, The New York Times, National Public Radio of USA and many others. She has served as Member of Provincial Assembly (MPA) Punjab from women reserved seats for Pakistan Peoples Party(PPP) 2008 to 2012. She holds dual American nationality.

She moved back to the USA in 2012, and now resides in New York. She is serving as Clinical Associate Professor of Medicine and Geriatrics at NYU Langone Health System, New York, USA. She is section chief of Geriatrics at NYU Langone Health Main Campus, New York, USA.

== Dual nationality case ==
On 4 June 2012, the Supreme Court of Pakistan admitted a petition by the registrar's office. The petition stated that Amna Buttar holds dual Pakistani and American nationality, and hence, according to Pakistan's constitution, she is not eligible to hold public office in Pakistan. Along with Amna Buttar, the petition included names of 13 other current members of National and Provincial assemblies in Pakistan.

== Controversy ==
In 2008, Amna Buttar criticised a Pakistani Beauty Pageant, Miss Pakistan World for being irrelevant to the problems faced by Pakistani women. "In Pakistan, we are trying to get basic rights for women: right to marry, right to divorce, equal opportunity for job and education, and issues like Miss Pakistan create problems for this movement...An average Pakistani young woman does not want to wear a bikini in public, and for her it is important to have equal opportunity and all focus should be on that, and not on a pageant where only the elite can participate."
