= Maurice Gehri =

Maurice Gehri (born? died?) was a Swiss and in 1921 the Delegate of the International Committee of the Red Cross during the Gemlik-Yalova Peninsula massacres. Together with an inter allied commission he participated in a humanitarian investigation to the events and wrote a report about it.
