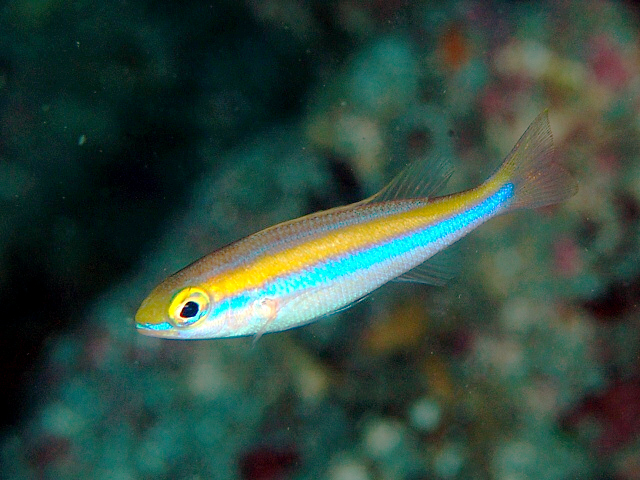

Conservation status
- Least Concern (IUCN 3.1)

Scientific classification
- Kingdom: Animalia
- Phylum: Chordata
- Class: Actinopterygii
- Order: Acanthuriformes
- Family: Nemipteridae
- Genus: Pentapodus
- Species: P. nagasakiensis

Binomial name
- Pentapodus nagasakiensis (Tanaka, 1915)

Synonyms
- Leptoscolopsis nagasakiensis Tanaka, 1915

= Pentapodus nagasakiensis =

Species of fish

Pentapodus nagasakiensis, the Japanese whiptail or Japanese butterfish, is a species of marine fish in the coral bream family (Nemipteridae) of order Perciformes. It is native to the western Pacific Ocean.

== Taxonomy ==
Pentapodus nagasakiensis was first formally described in 1915 as Leptoscolopsis nagasakiensis by the Japanese ichthyologist Shigeho Tanaka with its type locality given as the fish marker in Nagasaki. The 5th edition of Fishes of the World classifies the genus Pentapodus within the family Nemipteridae which it places in the order Spariformes.

== Etymology ==
Pentapodus nagasakiensis has a specific name which reflects its type locality, the fish market in Nagasaki.

== Description ==
Pentapodus nagasakiensis has its dorsal fin supported by 10 spines and 9 soft rays while the anal fin is supported by 3 spines and 7 soft rays. The scales on the head extend forward to a level with the front edge of the eyes and the rear nostrils. The suborbital is not scaled and neither is the lower limb of the preoperculum. The pelvic fins are moderately long extending to or nearly to the level of the anus. The caudal fin lobes are of equal length and are pointed. The overall colour is yellowish shading to whitish on the lower body. There is a clear, wide yellow stripe running from the snout to the caudal peduncle with whitish stripes above and below it. This species has a maximum published total length of 20 cm (7.9 in) although 10 cm (3.9 in) standard length is more typical.

== Distribution and habitat ==
Pentapodus nagasakiensis is found in the eastern Indian Ocean and Western Pacific Ocean from Japan in the north to northern Australia in the south, including Palau and New Caledonia. In Australia they are found from the Houtman Abrolhos in Western Australia east to the Arafura Sea and along the Great Barrier Reef of Queensland. Juveniles have been recorded as far south as Sydney. It is found at depths between 20 and 100 m (66 and 328 ft) in deeper offshore waters but it will swim into shallower estuaries and harbours.

== Biology ==
Pentapodus nagasakiensis is found as either solitary individuals or in small groups. It feeds mainly on small crustaceans, especially shrimp.
