= Ilıpınar, Atkaracalar =

Village in Turkey

Ilıpınar
- Neighbourhood
- Location in Turkey Ilıpınar (Turkey Central Anatolia)
- Coordinates: 40°47′48″N 33°6′58″E
- Country: Turkey
- Province: Çankırı
- District: Atkaracalar
- Municipality: Atkaracalar
- Population (2021): 144
- Time zone: UTC+3 (TRT)

Ilıpınar is a neighbourhood of the town Atkaracalar, Atkaracalar District, Çankırı Province, Turkey. Its population is 144 (2021).
