= Sarinh, Ludhiana =

Sarinh
- village
- Location in Punjab, India Sarinh (India)
- Coordinates: 30.795°N 75.872°E
- Country: India
- State: Punjab
- District: Ludhiana

Languages
  - Official: Punjabi
  - Regional: Punjabi
- Time zone: UTC+5:30 (IST)
- Telephone code: 0161-123456
- Nearest city: Ludhiana

Sarinh is a village in Ludhiana District of Punjab, India.

== Geography ==
Sarinh, approximately centered at 30°47′42″N 75°52′19″E, is located on the state highway no. 11.

== See also ==
- Sarinh, Jalandhar
- Buttar Sarinh
