= John Butter =

English ophthalmic surgeon

John Butter, M.D. (1791–1877) was an English ophthalmic surgeon.

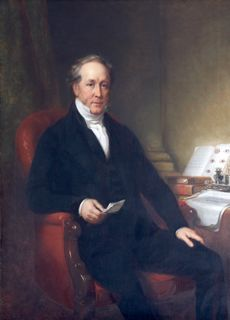
John Butter, 1854 portrait

== Life ==
Born at Woodbury, Devon, on 22 January 1791, he was educated at Exeter grammar school, and studied for the medical profession at Devon and Exeter Hospital. He obtained the M.D. degree at the University of Edinburgh in 1820, and was chosen a fellow of the Royal Society in 1822.

Butter was appointed surgeon of the South Devon Militia, and later settled at Plymouth, where he concentrated on diseases of the eye. Along with Dr. Edward Moore, he was the originator of the Plymouth Eye Dispensary. He lost one eye through ophthalmic rheumatism, contracted by exposure while examining recruits for the Crimean War, and in 1856 became totally blind.

== Works ==
Butter was the author of Ophthalmic Diseases (1821), Dockyard Diseases, or Irritative Fever (1825), and other medical and chirurgical memoirs.

== Notes ==
Attribution

This article incorporates text from a publication now in the public domain: Stephen, Leslie, ed. (1886). "Butter, John". Dictionary of National Biography. Vol. 8. London: Smith, Elder & Co.
