= Dehlon =

- Town
- Location in Punjab, India Dehlon (India)
- Coordinates: 30.7418079°N 75.8444165°E
- Country: India
- State: Punjab
- District: Ludhiana

Government
  - Type: Panchayat raj
  - Body: Gram panchayat

Languages
  - Official: Punjabi
  - Other spoken: Hindi
- Time zone: UTC+5:30 (IST)
- Telephone code: 0161
- ISO 3166 code: IN-PB
- Vehicle registration: PB-10
- Website: ludhiana.nic.in

Dehlon is a sub tehsil located in the Ludhiana, of Ludhiana district, Punjab.

== Administration ==
The village is administrated by a Sarpanch who is an elected representative of village as per constitution of India and Panchayati raj (India).

Particulars	Total	Male	Female
Total No. of Houses	1026		
Population	5190	2741	2449
21212132132	5MNC190	274CKVJ1	244DKJC9
