= Gedelek, Orhangazi =

Village in Turkey

Gedelek
- Neighbourhood
- Location in Turkey Gedelek (Marmara)
- Coordinates: 40°27′N 29°16′E
- Country: Turkey
- Province: Bursa
- District: Orhangazi
- Population (2022): 1,084
- Time zone: UTC+3 (TRT)

Gedelek is a neighbourhood in the municipality and district of Orhangazi, Bursa Province in Turkey. Its population is 1,084 (2022). It is known for its pickles, especially for its hot chilli peppers.
