= Gehri Buttar =

- village
- Location in Punjab, India Gehri Buttar (India)
- Coordinates: 30°05′39″N 74°52′40″E
- Country: India
- State: Punjab
- District: Bathinda
- Talukas: Bathinda

Population (2001)
  - Total: 3,485

Languages
  - Official: Punjabi (Gurmukhi)
  - Regional: Punjabi
- Time zone: UTC+5:30 (IST)
- PIN: 151401
- Nearest city: Bathinda
- Sex ratio: 1000/945 ♂/♀

Gehri Buttar is a village in the Bathinda district of Punjab state of India. The villagers belong to the Buttar clan of the Jatts.

== Geography ==
Gehri Buttar is centered (approx.) at, on the National Highway 64, only 16.2 km from Bathinda city. Phullo Mithi (4.2 km) and Sangat (4.2 km) are the nearby villages.

== Demographics ==
In 2001, the village had a total population of 3,485 with 588 households, 1,791 males and 1,694 females. Thus males constitutes 51.4% and females 48.6% of total population with the sex ratio of 945 females per thousand males.

== Culture ==
The village is predominated by the Jatt people of Buttar community/clan, who all are Sikhs and follows Sikhism. The beautiful Gurudwara Sahib is the main religious site for worship.

Punjabi is the mother tongue as well as the official language of the village.

== Economy ==
Agriculture is the main source of income. The villagers are government employees also. Some of the villagers have their own business in the nearby city or in the village, and the poor are mostly labourers.
