= Keramet, Orhangazi =

Village in Turkey

Keramet
- Neighbourhood
- Location in Turkey Keramet (Marmara)
- Coordinates: 40°30′33″N 29°28′30″E
- Country: Turkey
- Province: Bursa
- District: Orhangazi
- Population (2022): 895
- Time zone: UTC+3 (TRT)

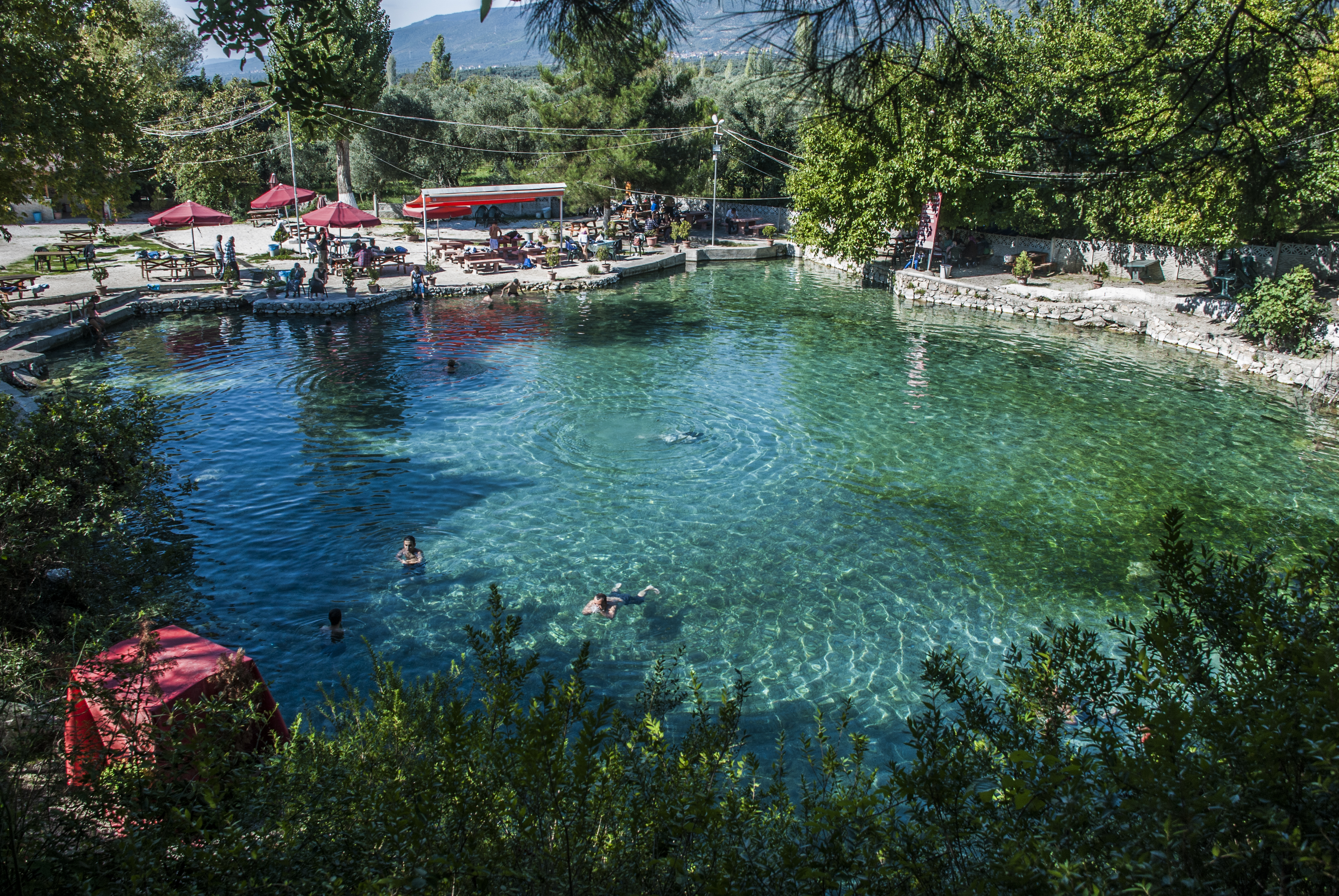
Spa in Keramet, Orhangazi

Keramet is a neighbourhood in the municipality and district of Orhangazi, Bursa Province in Turkey. Its population is 895 (2022). Its distance to Orhangazi is 18 kilometres (11 mi).

The village is known for its hot springs, and health tourism plays a major role in village economy.
