= Rukhsana Jamshed Buttar =

Pakistani politician

Member of the National Assembly of Pakistan
- In office 2012–2013

Rukhsana Jamshed Buttar (Urdu: رخصانہ جمشید بٹر) is a Pakistani politician who served as member of the National Assembly of Pakistan.

== Political career ==
She was elected to the National Assembly of Pakistan as a candidate of Pakistan Muslim League (Q) on a seat reserved for women from Punjab in 2012. She served as Federal Parliamentary Secretary for Petroleum and Natural Resources.
