= Butters (surname) =

Butters is a surname. Notable people with the surname include:

- Bill Butters (born 1951), retired World Hockey Association and National Hockey League player
- Charles Butters (1854–1933), American metallurgist, engineer, and mine owner
- Frank Butters (1878–1957), Austrian racehorse trainer
- Fred Butters (1904–1988), English rugby league footballer
- Guy Butters (born 1969), English professional footballer
- Sir John Butters (1885–1969), Australian electrical engineer
- Julia Butters (born 2009), American actor
- Lily Butters (1894–1980), Canadian founder of the Cecil Butters Memorial Hospital
- Tom Butters (baseball) (1938–2016), American college sports administrator and baseball pitcher
- Tom Butters (politician) (1925–2015), Canadian politician
- Wes Butters (born 1979), British radio broadcaster
- Zak Butters (born 2000), professional Australian rules footballer

== See also ==
- Butter (surname)
- Buttrose, a surname
