= Rabinder Buttar =

British business woman

Rabinder Buttar FRSE OBE, is the founder, CEO & Chair Person of the clinical research organisation CLINTEC, who has held a number of other positions in clinical companies in Scotland.

== Academia ==
Dr Buttar was born in India and holds a BSc in biochemistry from the University of Glasgow and a PhD in Immunology from the University of Strathclyde. as well as a certificate in Management from Reading, and received an honorary doctorate from the University of the West of Scotland. She served for four years on the board of the Institute of Clinical Research UK (ICR), is an Honorary Fellow of ICR, a Fellow of the Royal Society of Medicine and, in 2014, she became a Fellow of the Royal Society of Edinburgh.

== Awards ==
In 2009, Dr Rabinder Buttar was named the Institute of Directors, 'Director of the Year' for Glasgow & West of Scotland, and in 2010, she received the Ernst & Young Scottish Entrepreneur of the Year award. She was inducted into Strathclyde’s Academy of Distinguished Entrepreneurs in 2015, and in 2024 received on OBE (Order of the British Empire) for services in Entrepreneurship, Business Leadership and Innovation.
