= Buttar Sarinh =

- village
- Location in Punjab, India Buttar Sarinh (India)
- Coordinates: 30.357°N 74.6848°E
- Country: India
- State: Punjab
- Region: Punjab
- District: Sri Muktsar Sahib
- Talukas: Giddarbaha
- Elevation: 186 m (610 ft)

Population (2001)
  - Total: 1,967

Languages
  - Official: Punjabi
  - Regional: Punjabi
- Time zone: UTC+5:30 (IST)
- PIN: 152031
- Telephone code: 01633
- Vehicle registration: PB-60
- Nearest city: Sri Muktsar Sahib
- Sex ratio: 1000/904 ♂/♀
- Climate: BSh (Köppen)
- Avg. summer temperature: 43 °C (109 °F)
- Avg. winter temperature: 05 °C (41 °F)

Buttar Sarinh /bʊttər səriːŋ/, other spellings include Buttar Shrin and Buttar Shri, is a small village in the Giddarbaha tehsil of Sri Muktsar Sahib district in Punjab, India. It's located on the Sri Muktsar Sahib-Bathinda national Highway 754.

== Geography ==
Buttar Sarinh, having an average elevation of 186 metres (610 ft), is approximately centered at 30°21′25″N 74°41′05″E. The city and district of Bathinda (31 km) lies to its southeast, Sri Muktsar Sahib (21 km) to the northwest and Faridkot district to the north.BUP (Bathinda ) Airport is 20 km away from Buttar Sarinh.The Indian airforce base of Bhisiana lies just 11 km to the southeast and the state capital city of Chandigarh is 253 km to the east. Chhattiana (3.75k m), Lohara (3 km), Dhulkot (4 km) and Doda (6 km) are the surrounding villages.

== Culture ==
Punjabi is the mother tongue and official language of the village, predominated by the Jatt people of Buttar clan.

=== Religion ===
The village is predominated by the Sikhs, the followers of Sikhism with other minorities. A Gurudwara Sahib, on the main road, is the primary religious site. Dera Baba Bawa Sahib is also the place of religious respect in the memory of a Sant known as Baba Bawa Sahib.Two other Smadhs of Saints also here in this village on main road smadh of'peergarh'other Gurudwara Sahib on Chhattiana road.

== Demographics ==
As of 2001 census, total population of the village is 1,967 with 313 households, 1,033 males and 934 females. Thus males constitute 52.5% and females 47.5% of the total population with the sex ratio of 904 females per thousand males.

== Climate ==
The western Himalayas are located in the north and the Thar Desert in the southwest. The monsoon mainly determines the climate. The temperature reach up to 43 °C (109 °F) in summer and 5 °C (41 °F) in winter.

== Economy ==
As is common in the Punjab region, agriculture is the main occupation of the locals and main source of income as well. The main crops of the village are, wheat and cotton. Rice growing is started few years ago in the area. As of irrigation, Monsoon greatly affects the agriculture in the region as nearly 70% of the rain falls in July–September by the Monsoon while people use canal and tube wells also.

The few Hindu families have their small shops and general stores.

== See also ==
- Akkan Wali
- Buttar
- Buttar Kalan
- Kokri Buttran
- Lakhmir Wala
- Raipur
