= Kokri Buttran =

Kokri Buttran Buttran Di Kokri
- village
- Location in Punjab, India
- Coordinates: 30°52′32″N 75°20′39″E
- Country: India
- State: Punjab
- District: Moga
- Tehsil: Kot Ise Khan

Population (2001)
  - Total: 1,758

Languages
  - Official: Punjabi (Gurmukhi)
  - Regional: Punjabi
- Time zone: UTC+5:30 (IST)
- Nearest city: Moga
- Sex ratio: 1000/876 ♂/♀

Kokri Buttran is a village in the Moga district of the Punjab, India. It's also known as Buttran Di Kokri.

== Geography ==
Kokri Buttran is approximately centered at 30°52′32″N 75°20′39″E, only 18 km from Moga and 136 km from the state capital city of Chandigarh. Talwandi Mallian (2.5 km), Kokri Kalaan (3.6 km) and Daya Kalaan (3.8 km) are the nearby villages.

== Demographics ==
In 2001 the village had a total population of 1,758 with 307 households, 937 males and 821 females, thus 53% of males and 47% of females.

== Culture ==
Punjabi is the mother tongue as well as the official language here.

== Economy ==
Agriculture is the main source of income. The main crops are Wheat, Cotton and Rice
