= Buttar =

Jat clan in India and Pakistan

Buttar (Punjabi: ਬੁੱਟਰ) is a Punjabi Jat clan and surname, Found in Punjab region of both India and pakistan.

== Notable people ==
- Muhammad Javed Buttar, former justice of the Supreme Court of Pakistan
- Maninder Buttar, Indian singer
- Prit Buttar, British-Indian military historian
- Rabinder Buttar, British-Indian biochemist
- Ali Ijaz Buttar, member National Assembly of Pakistan
- Rashid Buttar, Pakistani-American osteopathic physician
- Vinaypal Buttar, Indian actor and singer-songwriter
- Rukhsana Jamshed Buttar, member National Assembly of Pakistan
- Amna Buttar, former member of Provincial Assembly of the Punjab, now Pakistani American medical doctor

== See also ==
- Buttar (disambiguation)
