= History of the Supreme Court of Pakistan =

The judicial complex of the Supreme Court in Islamabad.

The History of the Supreme Court of Pakistan, organised by the Chief Justice of Pakistan, follows from its constitutional establishment in 1947 till its recent events. The Supreme Court of Pakistan is the highest appellate court of the country and court of last resort— the final arbiter of the law and the Constitution.

Having established in 1948 as the Federal Court, the Supreme Court's constitutional restructure and recreation was reviewed by the 1956 articles; it has retained its name and jurisdiction through the successive legal instruments since 1973 convention. The Supreme Court enjoys the constitutional and jurisdictional supremacy over any court in the Court system of the country where it exercises original, appellate and review jurisdiction. It possesses exclusive original jurisdiction for the settlement of intergovernmental disputes between federal and provisional governments and high courts Inter se. Since Pakistan's establishment in 1947, the Supreme Court has played a prominent role in country's events, and its decisions ultimately deciding the fate of the country.

== Transient period ==
=== Early years (1947–1960) ===
Upon the establishment of Pakistan, the Founder of Pakistan and Governor-General approved the appointment of Sir Abdul Rashid as the nation's first Chief Justice in 1948. Justice Sir Rashid was succeeded by Justice Muhammad Munir in 1954. Perhaps, the most controversial case of at that time was the Maulvi Tamizuddin Khan vs. the Governor-General, in which the Supreme Court solidified the "Doctrine of necessity" by well quoted by Chief Justice Munir: Relying on the Bracton's maxim, that which is otherwise not lawful is made lawful by necessity', thereby providing the label that would come to be attached to the judgment and the doctrine that it was establishing."

Another major case that was heard by the Supreme Court bench led by Chief Justice Muhammad Shahabuddin was on 7 October 1958. The Chief Justice Shahabuddin bench heard "The State vs. Dosso & anor.", under which the majority of Chief Justice Shahabuddin bench provided the legal validation of the martial law imposed by President of Pakistan Iskander Mirza. In further, President Mirza was dismissed in two weeks by Chief of Army Staff General Ayub Khan whose actions was also to be held valid by Chief Justice Shahabuddin's court.

== Provisional Constitutional Order and Supreme Court ==
=== PCO 1981 (General Zia ul Haq Martial Law) ===
The first ever Provisional Constitutional Order (PCO) was declared by General Zia ul Haq on 25 March 1981.

Name	Appointed	Normal Retirement	Action on PCO oath
Hon. Justice Dorab Patel	?	?	refused PCO oath, asked to resign
Ad hoc Judge Fakhar uddin G. Ebrahim	?	?	refused PCO oath, asked to resign
Justice Molvi Mushtaq	?	?	willing to take oath but not invited to take oath
Chief Justice Justice Anwaar-ul-Haq	?	?	not invited to take oath

==== Shariat Appellate Bench ====
Established by General Muhammad Zia ul-Haq in 1980, the Shariat Appellate Bench is composed of three Muslim Judges of the Supreme Court, and two ad hoc judges drawn either from the Federal Shariat Court or from among the Ulema. Decisions made the Federal Shariat Court may be appealed to the Appellate Bench, as the Bench is the final authority on Islamic law in Pakistan.

=== PCO 1999 (General Pervez Musharraf First Martial Law) ===
The second PCO in the history of Pakistan was declared by General Pervez Musharraf on 14 October 1999. When the PCO was proclaimed, at first the judiciary was not asked to take an oath. On 26 January 2000 Musharraf issued an order "Oath of Office (Judges) Order, 2000" that required the judiciary to take oath of office under the PCO. The then Chief Justice Saeeduzzaman Siddiqui and 5 other judges of the Supreme Court refused to take any oath in contravention to the oath they took under the 1973 Constitution, when they became judges. Majority of the judges had more than 3 years remaining in their office. Refusing to take oath deprived them from continuing as judges, which was later termed as un-constitutional move by General Musharraf.

Justice Iftikhar Muhammad Chaudhary, the present chief justice of the Supreme Court, although took oath under the PCO, but the senior judges refused to take oath.

see Pakistani coup d'état 1999

== The attack on the Supreme Court in 1997 ==
Following the establishment of Anti Terrorism Courts and the Fourteenth Amendment in November 1997, legislators from different parties brought the matter before the Supreme Court under Chief Justice Sajad Ali Shah. Nawaz Sharif, Prime minister at that time, harshly criticised the Chief Justice during the proceedings and was found in contempt.

On 30 November 1997, Sharif appeared before the Supreme Court along with party workers, members, chief ministers, and constituents to hear the proceedings. Unruly party workers stormed into the Supreme Court, forcing Chief Justice Sajjad Ali Shah to remove the finding of contempt against Sharif. Hundreds of PML-N supporters and members of its youth wing, the Muslim Students federation (MSF), breached the police barrier around the courthouse when defence lawyer S.M. Zafar was arguing Sharif's case.

A journalist rushed into the courtroom and warned the bench of an impending attack. The Chief Justice rose abruptly, thanked Zafar and adjourned the hearing. The justices quickly left the courtroom but workers were able to enter, shouting slogans and damaging furniture.

The mob, led by ruling Punjabi party member Sardar Naseem and the retired Colonel Mushtaq Tahir Kheli, Sharif's political secretary, chanted slogans against the Chief Justice. The mob also attacked Pakistan Peoples Party senator Iqbal Haider. Police eventually managed to restore normalcy using batons and tear gas both inside and outside the courthouse, but the court could only proceed for about 45 minutes.

== The Supreme Court under Musharraf ==
Shortly after General Musharraf overthrew Sharif in the 1999 Pakistani coup d'état, the opposition challenged the legitimacy of the coup and asked the court to rule on its legality. On 12 May 2000 the Court rendered a nuanced verdict.

- In its preamble, the Court
  - rejected the options of "complete surrender" to the regime or total opposition which, in its judgement, would have led to the "closure of the courts". It chose a middle ground (praised by retired US judge John Clifford Wallace) that allowed the Court to maximise its influence.
  - asserted that it had the inherent power to examine the validity of Musharraf's orders, even orders purportedly restraining the Court from questioning his proclamations.
  - called Musharraf's coup an "extra-constitutional action".
- In its judgement, however, the Court
  - accepted the coup on the grounds of
    - the doctrine of state Necessity (a situation having arisen for which "there was no remedy provided in the Constitution", checks and balances such as Article 58(2)(b) having been removed by the Thirteenth Amendment, hence Necessitas facit licitum quod alias non-est licitum).
    - the principle of salus populi est suprema lex.
    - the principle "that the government should be by the consent of the governed, whether voters or not" (the court took note of the fact that the takeover was widely welcomed, and little-protested, and hence that the regime had the implied consent of the governed).
  - asserted the right of the Superior Courts to review the orders, proceedings, acts, and legislative measures of the Musharraf regime.
  - termed the situation a "case of constitutional deviation for a transitional period".
  - accepted the government's argument that the electoral rolls were outdated and that fresh elections could not be held without updating the electoral rolls, and that two years were required to do so.
  - gave Musharraf until 12 May 2002 to hold elections.
  - reserved for itself the right to review/re-examine the continuation of Musharraf's emergency powers.

Although the government, before this judgement, had not given a timetable for the restoration of democracy – having argued that it needed an indefinite and possibly prolonged time to reform the country – Musharraf publicly submitted to the Court's judgement. The elections were duly held in October 2002 as ordered and the Constitution was revived. However, Musharraf later decided to retain power and enacted the Seventeenth Amendment in December 2003, largely incorporating the 2002 Legal Framework Order into the Constitution.

=== Reference against Chief Justice ===
On 9 March 2007 a presidential reference was served to the Chief Justice, Iftikhar Muhammad Chaudhry, attempting to suspend him. The government ordered him to go on compulsory leave, but on 20 July 2007 the Supreme Court unanimously overturned the compulsory leave order and by a 10–13 majority also ordered Chaudhry reinstated as Chief Justice.

The Court nonetheless ruled that the Provisional Order 27 of 1970, which removed executive power to suspend judges, was unconstitutional.Text of Supreme Court Order

=== State of Emergency ===
Immediately following the imposition of the state of emergency on 3 November 2007, the Chief Justice Chaudhry was removed from the Supreme Court and arrested by troops of the 111th brigade of Pakistan Army sent by General Musharraf (who resigned in August 2008 under impeachment pressures).

Until the state of emergency was declared, Justices of the Supreme Court were:

- Hon. Chief Justice Mr. Justice Iftikhar Mohammad Chaudhry (Restored on 17 March 2009)
- Hon. Mr. Justice Rana Bhagwandas (Retired after deposed. Retired on 20 December 2007)
- Hon. Mr. Justice Javaid Iqbal (Restored on 17 March 2009)
- Hon. Mr. Justice Abdul Hameed Dogar (Took oath under PCO on 3 November 2007)
- Hon. Mr. Justice Sardar Muhammad Raza Khan (Retook oath/reappointed on 19 September 2008 during democratic period)
- Hon. Mr. Justice Khalil-ur-Rehman Ramday (Restored on 17 March 2009)
- Hon. Mr. Justice Muhammad Nawaz Abbasi (Took oath under PCO on 3 November 2007)
- Hon. Mr. Justice Faqir Muhammad Khokhar (Took oath under PCO on 3 November 2007)
- Hon. Mr. Justice Falak Sher (Retired after deposed. Retired on 21 September 2008)
- Hon. Mr. Justice Mian Shakirullah Jan (Retook oath/reappointed on 5 September 2008 during democratic period)
- Hon. Mr. Justice M. Javed Buttar (Took oath under PCO on 3 November 2007)
- Hon. Mr. Justice Tassaduq Hussain Jillani (Retook oath/reappointed on 5 September 2008 during democratic period)
- Hon. Mr. Justice Saiyed Saeed Ashhad (Took oath under PCO)
- Hon. Mr. Justice Nasir-ul-Mulk (Retook oath/reappointed on 19 September 2008 during democratic period)
- Hon. Mr. Justice Raja Fayyaz Ahmed (Restored on 17 March 2009)
- Hon. Mr. Justice Chaudhry Ijaz Ahmed (Restored on 17 March 2009)
- Hon. Mr. Justice Syed Jamshed Ali (Retook oath/reappointed on 5 September 2008 during democratic period)
- Hon. Mr. Justice Hamid Ali Mirza (Ad hoc judge)(Refused oath under PCO)
- Hon. Mr. Justice Ghulam Rubbani (Ad hoc judge)(Refused oath under PCO)

=== Sex Scandal involving Supreme Court Justices ===
According to The Times, the justices who pledged allegiance to Musharraf had earlier been caught engaging in sexual acts with prostitutes. The article alleged that photographs of the judges engaging in sexual acts were used to blackmail the judges to take the oath of allegiance and make rulings favourable to the military.

=== Supreme Court composition under Musharraf after 3 November 2007 ===
The Supreme Court of Pakistan consisted of the following justices who took the Provisional Constitutional Order of 3 November 2007:

- Hon. Chief Justice Mr. Justice Abdul Hameed Dogar
- Hon. Justice Muhammad Nawaz Abbasi
- Hon. Justice Faqir Muhammad Khokhar
- Hon. Justice M. Javed Buttar
- Hon. Justice Saiyed Saeed Ashhad.
- Hon. Justice Ijaz-ul-Hassan
- Hon. Justice Muhammad Qaim Jan Khan
- Hon. Justice Mohammad Moosa K. Legari
- Hon. Justice Ch. Ejaz Yousaf
- Hon. Justice Muhammad Akhtar Shabbir
- Hon. Justice Zia Perwez
- Hon. Justice Mian Hamid Farooq
- Hon. Justice Syed Sakhi Hussain Bokhari
- Hon. Justice Syed Zawwar Hussain Jaffery
- Hon. Justice Sheikh Hakim Ali (Took PCO Oath to Lahore High Court, elevated to Supreme Court on 8 February 2008)

Justice Abdul Hameed Dogar took the oath of Chief Justice even after a 7-member Supreme Court that included Chief Justice Chaudhry nullified the imposition of emergency, suspension of constitution, and PCO. The Court instructed the justices not to take oath under the PCO, and all military personnel not to obey any illegal orders.

On 15 February 2008 the Supreme Court delivered a detailed judgement to validate the Proclamation of Emergency on 3 November 2007, the Provisional Constitution Order No. 1 of 2007 and the Oath of Office (Judges) Order, 2007. This judgement was made by the full court and written by Chief Justice Abdul Hameed Dogar. According to the judgement, "The learned Chief Justices and Judges of the superior courts, (Supreme Court of Pakistan, Federal Shariat Court and the High Courts), who have not been given, and who have not made, oath under the Oath of Office (Judges) Order, 2007 have ceased to hold their respective offices on the 3rd of November 2007. Their cases cannot be re-opened being hit by the doctrine of past and closed transaction".

== Recent events ==
=== Restoration of Judges ===
On 15 March 2009 a two-year-old lawyers' movement working for restoration of the judiciary as it existed prior to the state of emergency called for a long march and a sit-in in Islamabad. Before the procession could reach Islamabad, the Prime Minister Yousuf Raza Gilani appeared on national television and announced unconditional restoration of the judiciary. On 17 March 2009 the formal official notification for restoration of the judiciary was issued. As the result of the notification, all judges who had not retired due to age limit and had not re-taken oath were restored back. Justice Javaid Iqbal, Justice Ijaz Ahmed, Justice Khalil-ur-Rehman Ramday and Justice Raja Fayyaz Ahmed were restored to their position as of 2 November 2007 with immediate effect. Justice Iftikhar Mohammad Chaudhry was notified to re-assume his office on 22 March 2009. Justice Rana Bhagwandas and Justice Falak Sher had since retired.

=== Long March Controversy ===
General Ashfaq P. Kayani, the Chief of Army Staff, also had an important role by silently intervening and encouraging a rapprochement between the government and the opposition. Neither side acknowledged this role, however, until lawyers' movement leader Aitezaz Ahsan publicly admitted Kayani's role. There were rumours that protestors and law enforcement would have violently collided otherwise had he not intervened.

=== Independence of the judiciary ===
The restoration of the judges resulted from immense public pressure and led the judiciary to begin a quest for independence. The goal was to ensure a strong and efficient judicial system that could quickly deliver justice to the public. The Supreme Court took notice of several important constitutional and other matters in this period that related to the public interest. These matters included the constitutional petition on PCO judges to declare 3 November 2007 actions null and void and the constitutional petition on the national reconciliation ordinance (NRO) to declare it null and void. The Supreme Court has also been vigilant on corruption cases related to the current ruling elite, acting in cases such as the Hajj scam, rental power projects, steel mills of Pakistan, and National Insurance Corporation Limited (NICL). This judicial activism and the slowing of government productivity without corruption has created a tension between the judiciary and other government branches.

=== Constitutional petitions No. 8 and 9 of 2009 ===
Of the 14 justices that rendered a verdict related to taking an oath under the PCO, 12 had taken the oath themselves. However, they controversially did not apply the judgement to themselves.

Name	Status
Mr. Justice Iftikhar Muhammad Chaudhry, CJ.	Took Oath on PCO as Chief Justice Balochistan High Court on 26 January 2000
Mr. Justice Javed Iqbal	Took Oath on PCO as Judge of Balochistan High Court on 26 January 2000
Mr. Justice Sardar Muhammad Raza Khan	Took Oath on PCO as Judge of Peshawar High Court on 26 January 2000
Mr. Justice Khalil-ur-Rehman Ramday	Took Oath on PCO as Judge of Lahore High Court on 26 January 2000
Mr. Justice Mian Shakirullah Jan	Took Oath on PCO as Judge of Peshawar High Court on 26 January 2000
Mr. Justice Tassaduq Hussain Jillani	Took Oath on PCO as Judge of Lahore High Court on 26 January 2000
Mr. Justice Nasir-ul-Mulk	Took Oath on PCO as Judge of Peshawar High Court on 26 January 2000
Mr. Justice Raja Fayyaz Ahmed	Took Oath on PCO as Judge of Balochistan High Court on 26 January 2000
Mr. Justice Ch. Ijaz Ahmed	Took Oath on PCO as Judge of Lahore High Court on 26 January 2000
Mr. Justice Ghulam Rabbani	Took Oath on PCO as Judge of Sindh High Court on 26 January 2000
Mr. Justice Sarmad Jalal Osmany	Took Oath on PCO as Judge of Sindh High Court on 26 January 2000
Mr. Justice Muhammad Sair Ali Khattak	Appointed as a Judge of the Lahore High Court Lahore on 2 May 2001
Mr. Justice Mahmood Akhtar Shahid Siddiqui	Appointed as a Judge of the Lahore High Court Lahore on 21 September 2001
Mr. Justice Jawwad S. Khawaja.	Took Oath on PCO as Judge of Lahore High Court on 26 January 2000

As a result of 31 July 2009 decision handed down in the case of Constitutional Petitions 8 and 9 of 2009, the following justices resigned before their cases were referred to Supreme Judicial Council:

Name	Appointed	Status on 2 November 2007	PCO oath, Result of Judgement
Faqir Muhammad Khokhar	10 January 2002.	Supreme Court Judge	Khokkhar resigned from the Court on 5 August 2009. His normal retirement would have been 15 April 2010
Justice M. Javed Buttar	29 July 2004	Supreme Court Judge	Buttar resigned from the Court on 5 August 2009. His normal retirement would have been 15 November 2013

In addition to the above justices, the following justices were removed from the Supreme Court of Pakistan on the ground that their appointment to the court was made without consultation with the de jure Chief Justice of Pakistan.

Name	Appointed	Status on 2 November 2007	PCO oath, Result of Judgement
Justice Muhammad Qaim Jan Khan	6 November 2007	Peshawar High Court Judge	Khan became a Supreme Court justice on 6 November 2007. He was removed and deemed to have retired as a judge.
Justice Ijaz-ul-Hassan	6 November 2007	Peshawar High Court Judge	Ijaz-ul-Hassan became a Supreme Court justice 6 November 2007. He was removed and deemed to have retired as a judge.
Justice Mohammad Moosa K. Legari	6 November 2007	Judge Sindh High Court	Legari became a Supreme Court justice 6 November 2007. He was removed and deemed to have retired as a judge.
Justice Ch. Ejaz Yousaf	6 November 2007	Chairman Press Council	Yousaf was a retired Chief Justice of the Federal Shariat Court before he became a Supreme Court justice. He was removed from the bench.
Justice Zia Perwez	13 November 2007	Judge Sindh High Court	Perwez became a Supreme Court justice 13 November 2007. Perwez was removed and reinstated as a judge for the Sindh High Court.
Justice Mian Hamid Farooq	10 December 2007	Lahore High Court Judge	Farooq became a Supreme Court justice 10 December 2007. He was removed and deemed to have retired as a judge.
Justice Syed Sakhi Hussain Bokhari	10 December 2007	Lahore High Court Judge	Bokhari became a Supreme Court justice 10 December 2007. He was removed and reinstated as a judge for the Lahore High Court.
Justice Syed Zawwar Hussain Jaffery	10 December 2007	Retired Sindh High court Judge	Jaffery became a Supreme Court justice 10 December 2007. He was removed and deemed to have retired as a judge.
Justice Sheikh Hakim Ali	8 February 2008	Lahore High Court Judge	Ali became a Supreme Court justice 8 February 2008. He was removed and deemed to have retired as a judge.
Justice Muhammad Furrukh Mahmud	8 February 2008	Retired Lahore High Court Judge	Mahmud became a Supreme Court justice 8 February 2008. He was removed from the bench.
Hon. Sarmad Jalal Osmany	19 September 2008	Sindh High Court Judge	Osmany refused the PCO oath and was appointed to Supreme Court on 19 September 2008. He was removed from the bench of Supreme Court and reverted to a Sindh High Court Judge. He was then appointed as Chief Justice of Sindh High Court on 1 August 2009.
Justice Sardar Muhammad Aslam	7 March 2009	Lahore High Court Judge	Aslam took the PCO oath on 3 November 2007 and became a Supreme Court Justice on 7 March 2009. He was removed and deemed to have retired.

==== Controversial aspect of the decision ====
The decision of the Court summarily removed all justices of the higher judiciary who were not part of it as of 2 November 2007. Their removal was ordered on the grounds that the de jure Chief Justice was not allowed to advise in these cases. In the same decision the court held that the de jure Chief Justice from 3 November 2007 to 22 March 2009 was Justice Chaudhry.

There were three groups of removed justices:

- Those elevated to higher courts who initially took oath under the PCO
- Those who were elevated to higher courts after restoration of the Constitution and were appointed by Musharraf
- Those who were elevated to higher courts after restoration of the Constitution and were appointed by Asif Ali Zardari

The Supreme Court bench that rendered the decision consisted entirely of justices who had taken oath under the PCO of 1999 themselves, but were already sitting justices of the higher judiciary at the time and had taken a constitutional oath. The 1999 PCO and decisions made under it were given constitutional protection by Seventeenth amendment.

This decision has resulted in situations where:

1. newly appointed justices who never took any sort of oath under any PCO have been removed
2. sitting justices who took an oath under the 2007 PCO are still acting as justices, though their cases will be sent to Supreme Judicial Council
3. sitting justices who were reappointed and took oath under Justice Dogar are still acting as justices with no action
4. justices who took oath under the PCO of 1999 are still functioning as justices of higher judiciary

Critics of the decision question the fact that some PCO judges are still working and some non-PCO judges have been sacked.

==== Review petition filed by Lahore High Court non-PCO removed judges ====
Removed ad hoc judges of the Lahore High Court have filed several petitions in the Supreme Court in Lahore for review of its judgment, which sent 76 judges of Supreme Courts and High Courts immediately home.

These judges argue that they were qualified to be appointed as judges of the High Court in accordance with the requirements of Article 193(2)of the 1973 Constitution and were offered to serve as ad hoc judges following the consultation required under the Constitution. They accepted the offer and took oath when the state of emergency was lifted. They never took oath under a PCO and continued performing the functions of judges of the High Court until judgement was rendered against them.

These judges were appointed by Lahore High Court Chief Justice Justice Zahid Hussain, who is still a justice of the Supreme Court of Pakistan and is not being tried before the Supreme Judicial Counsel.

The petition also noted that none of the sacked judges were made parties to the decision against them, nor were they able to comment in the hearing or in some cases aware that the hearing was taking place. They also allege that no copy of the decision was sent to the High Court or to the judges concerned.
