= Suspension of Iftikhar Muhammad Chaudhry =

Suspension of the Chief Justice of Pakistan by the President

Supreme Court of Pakistan

Chief Justice of Pakistan Iftikhar Muhammad Chaudhry was made a "non-functional Chief Justice" on 9 March 2007. In so acting, President Pervez Musharraf invoked two main clauses of the Constitution of Pakistan. The suspension evoked a nationwide popular mass protest movement led by lawyers, known as the Lawyers' Movement and eventually culminated with the Pakistan Long March.

== Timeline March 2007 ==
=== 9–12 March 2007 ===
President of Pakistan, General Pervez Musharraf on 9 March 2007 virtually suspended the Chief Justice of Pakistan, Justice Iftikhar Mohammad Chaudhry, and appointed the next most senior judge available, Justice Javaid Iqbal, as the acting Chief Justice of the Supreme Court. Later it was explained that the senior-most judge after the Chief Justice was Justice Rana Bhagwandas, but since he was away from the country, Justice Javed Iqbal being the second in line was made the acting head of the apex court until Justice Bhagwandas would return.

The move to make Justice Iftikhar Chaudhry 'non-functional' was immediately followed by yet another decision by the president to send a reference under Article 209 of the Constitution of Pakistan to the Supreme Judicial Council (SJC) to investigate allegations of misconduct against him.

Justice Chaudhry was called on by the President at his Army residence in Rawalpindi on Friday, 9 March 2007. There, he was asked to explain his position on a list of charges brought against him from several quarters. He was then asked to resign, something which Justice Chaudhry refused to do and was henceforth detained for about five hours while arrangements were made elsewhere in Islamabad for speedy appointment of the Acting-Chief Justice.

According to further reports he was only allowed to leave when the Acting-Chief Justice had taken oath of office and proceedings of the Supreme Judicial Council had begun. According to legal analysts, the procedure adopted by the President is not only unjust and inappropriate but also unconstitutional and therefore illegal.

The president's orders came in the afternoon, and within minutes took the country by storm. Many in the legal fraternity were shocked by the way the country's top adjudicator had been treated. Within hours, public in general and lawyers specifically rallied around him. Chief Justice Iftikhar Chaudhry's reaction was not known as since his "suspension" or being made "non-functional" he had remained incommunicado. After his meeting with President Musharraf, he remained inside the presidential office for a few hours, and was later prevented from going to the Supreme Court by the security officials. He was later placed under unofficial house arrest and media or anyone from the outside world was not allowed to approach him.

Soon after the oath taking ceremony, the SJC went into a session and decided to call on Chief Justice Iftikhar Muhammad Chaudhry on 13 March to answer the allegations of misconduct levelled against him. Presided over by Acting Chief Justice Javed Iqbal, the SJC also ordered the Chief Justice not to perform functions as judge of the Supreme Court or as the Chief Justice until the reference was decided on by the council.

The SJC meeting was also attended by apex court judges namely Justice Abdul Hameed Dogar and Justice Sardar Muhammad Raza Khan, Chief Justice of Lahore High Court Iftikhar Hussain Chaudhry and Chief Justice Sindh High Court Sabihuddin Ahmad, who had flown into Islamabad earlier in the day.

According to the Advocate General of Sindh, Justice Chaudhry is still the Chief Justice of Pakistan, and should be allowed to exercise all due privileges. However, the flags of the Islamic Republic of Pakistan and the Supreme Court have been removed from his home and his name and references were initially removed from the website of the Supreme Court of Pakistan; but were restored 24 hours later. The reason presented by the Officials of Supreme Court for the removal of the information from the website was that it happened due to some technical errors.

According to BBC Urdu and The News (Pakistani newspaper), the supreme judicial council planned to look into the inquiry against Justice Chaudhry. Out of the three Judges of the council there are corruption cases already pending against two judges (one for financial corruption and the other for a case related to fraud in land) and the third Judge allegedly had his daughter admitted to a medical college on the recommendations of the Chief Minister of a province of Pakistan.

On 12 March 2007, lawyers across Pakistan began boycotting all court procedures in protest against the suspension. In the capital Islamabad, and in other cities such as Lahore, Karachi and Quetta, hundreds of lawyers dressed in black suits attended rallies, condemning the suspension as unconstitutional. More than twenty lawyers were injured in clashes with police during the demonstrations in Lahore.

=== 13 March 2007 (First Hearing) ===
On 13 March 2007, Justice Chaudhry appeared before a closed hearing with the SJC. The hearing lasted for two hours and was adjourned until Friday 16 March. Justice Chaudhry issued a four-page press release denouncing the moves against him, saying that neither President Musharraf nor the SJC had the authority to prevent him from working. He also reported that his telephones at home had been disconnected and vehicles confiscated.

=== 16 March 2007 ===
CJP Justice Iftikhar requested that because his lawyers were not allowed to meet him by the government, the hearing should be adjourned till 26 March 2007. SJC did not entertain it and the next date of hearing was announced in a press release to be 21 March 2007 at one end all this was going on and at the other end the government attacked a popular TV channel "GEO" in islamabad to turn attentions of people.

=== 19 March 2007 charges leaked ===
Full text of the reference against CJP Justice Chaudhry was leaked to the press on 19 March 2007. The main charges against CJP Justice Chaudhry are as following.

- CJP forced government officials to unlawfully help his son get admission to medical college and then had him appointed as Grade 18 Police Officer.
- CJP was entitled to use a 1700cc car, but he used a 3000cc Mercedes and kept several other vehicles in his use in Lahore, Islamabad and Karachi.
- CJP required more protocol than he deserved. He required senior officials to receive him at airports and was also using helicopters and planes to go to private functions.
- Use of a BMW Car "RAZIA 1" by his family
- Different Oral and Written Orders in cases worth 55 million PKR
- Asking for more perks than he was eligible for.

=== 21 March 2007 ===
On 20 March 2007, SJC issued a press release citing that the next hearing of reference, which was scheduled on 21 March 2007, would be postponed till 9:30 am PST on 3 April 2007. The press release does not cite any reason for this move.

== Timeline April 2007 ==
=== 3 April 2007 ===
The Supreme Judicial Council Tuesday adjourned hearing of presidential reference against non-functional chief justice Iftikhar Muhammad Chaudhry till 13 April. Barrister Aitzaz Ahsan, leading lawyer assisting the non-functional Chief Justice in the reference, gave his arguments for open trial in the SJC proceedings, which were continued for an hour. He argued against in-camera hearing of the reference.

Barrister Wasim Sajjad and former minister of law Khalid Ranjha appeared before the SJC on behalf of the government. Attorney General Makhdoom Ali Khan appeared on behalf of the SJC on court notice. The lawyers and opposition parties' leaders and activists gathered in large number outside the Supreme Court building during hearing of the reference.

Earlier, Justice Iftikhar Muhammad Chaudhry reached Supreme Court along with his lawyers Barrister Aitzaz Ahsan, Hamid Ali Khan and Justice (Rtd) Tarique Mehmood to appear in the Supreme Judicial Council hearing of presidential reference against him. Barrister Aitzaz Ahsan, leading lawyer assisting the non-functional Chief Justice in the reference, talking to newsmen said that he would raise various objections before the SJC in today's hearing.

He said that he will argue for open trial of Justice Iftikhar Chaudhry in the hearing, as people should know the truth of charges against the non-functional chief justice. Aitzaz Ahsan said that he will also discuss the constitutional status of the Supreme Judicial Council and will argue over whether appointment of the Acting Chief Justice is constitutional or not. Large number of lawyers, political leaders and activists of opposition parties were present before the Supreme Court building when Justice Iftikhar reached the court for hearing of the presidential reference. They were chanting slogans against the government.

The SJC proceedings began 45 minutes late than the scheduled time. Barrister Aitzaz Ahsan presented his arguments before the council.

He argued before the SJC that the non-functional chief justice wants open trial of the reference and called for the open trial as the nation come to know the truth of the charges against Justice Iftikhar Chaudhry.

Meanwhile, Federal Minister for Information Muhammad Ali Durrani, talking with Geo News, said that the government has not interfered anywhere and given chance to all sides to express their opinions. He said the lawyers have taken a wise decision by distancing them from the political parties. It would be now more convenient for the government to hold talks with lawyers associations and hear their point of view, he further said.

He said that some lawyers are in contact with the government. He also confessed that the lawyers' bodies are much organised on the chief justice issue.

=== 13 April 2007 Morning ===
Strict security measures have been taken in Islamabad on the hearing of presidential reference against non-functional Chief Justice Iftikhar Muhammad Chaudhry here on Friday.

Additional contingents of law enforcement forces were deployed in Islamabad whereas FC put on stand- by position. Strict surveillance also carried out at entry and exit routes of the city.

A separate traffic plan has been prepared to maintain traffic flow in the capital, however, traffic jam was reported in different areas of Islamabad including Faizabad, a main entry route of the city.

Large number of political workers of Pakistan Peoples Party, Muslim League (N), Jammat-I-Islami, Pakistan Tahreek-i-Insaaf, ANP and JUI( Sahibzada Fazal Karim Group) have gathered outside Supreme Court building.

Meanwhile, Muttahida Majlis Amal(MMA) leader Qazi Hussain Ahmad and Tahreek-i-Insaaf chairman Imran Khan also reached Supreme Court to lead the protests.

Opposition leader in National Assembly, chief of JUI (F) and MMA Secretary General Maulana Fazul Rehman has assured to take part in the protest.

According To Govt Officials Possibly the Govt Lawyer Wasim Sajjad will give the Evidences after the completion of Aitzaz Ahsan Arguments.

=== 13 April 2007 (evening) ===
Supreme Judicial Council (SJC) has adjourned the hearing of presidential reference against non-functional Chief Justice Iftikhar Muhammad Chaudhry till 18 April.

The SJC had decided that from now onwards, the hearing would be carried out on two consecutive days.

The lawyer of Justice Iftikhar Chaudhry Barrister Atizaz Ahsan argued about the position of three SJC judges Justice Javed Iqbal, Justice Chaudhry Iftikhar and Justice Abdul Hamid Dogar.

In a three-hour session, Atizaz Ahsan completed his legal arguments on the objections and reservations regarding judges' position. He had completed his arguments. Panel of lawyers of Justice Iftikhar Chaudhry: Munir A Malik, Qazi Anwar, Tariq Mahmood and Hamid Ali Khan.

The Constitution Avenue has been closed for traffic and traffic jam was reported in various parts of the city.

== Timeline May 2007 ==
=== 6 May 2007 ===
In the city of Lahore he fuelled opposition to the military rule of President Pervez Musharraf Sunday, telling a crowd of thousands that dictatorships will inevitably be 'destroyed'. He also said Nations and states that are based on dictatorship instead of the supremacy of the constitution, the rule of law and protection of basic rights get destroyed.'. Although made no direct reference to President Pervez Musharraf it is believed that the criticism was an attack on Musharraf.. However Musharraf in Sindh said the lawyers must stop using the 'purely constitutional and judicial matter' of Chaudhry's suspension for political gains.

=== 12 May 2007 Karachi Riots ===
As of 12 May 2007, at least 42 people had been killed,140 injured in riots erupting across the city of Karachi—capital of the Sindh province and the most populous city in the country of Pakistan. Roads had been blocked, cars burned and hundreds of people injured and arrested. As soon as the CJP Iftikhar Muhammad Chaudhry's plane touched down in Karachi airport, The city erupted in violence, especially the famous Karachi road of 'Shahray-e-Faisal' as armed mobs fired indiscriminately at the people due to receive CJP. Iftikhar Muhammad Chaudhry had come to address the city bar association on the 50th anniversary of the establishment of the Pakistani Supreme Court.

Many of those killed were supporters of Chief Justice Chaudhry and supporters of the Pakistan Peoples Party (PPP). More than 800 political workers have been arrested, the majority of whom were members of labour and student organisations that had been planning to greet Chaudhry on his arrival.

Human Rights Watch, a human rights group based in the United States, said "this [violence] can either be due to the incompetence of the government, or its complicity." Their statement went on, "The sequence of events leading up to this violence, including statements from the provincial authorities and the arrest of hundreds of opposition activists in the last few days, indicates that the government, acting through its coalition partners, has deliberately sought to foment violence in Karachi."

The Chief Justice was stationed at the Jinnah International Airport and was unable to leave due to violence and road-blocks established around his location till 8 p.m.

The government agreed to send a helicopter to transport him out of the airport, but Chaudhry refused, indicating that he wished to travel by ground. Ultimately, Chaudhry would not compromise on this issue and returned to Islamabad, stating that he was unwilling to leave the airport without sufficient security as well as his cadré of lawyers.

One of the leaders of the MQM, Farooq Sattar, expressed his commiserations to the injured journalists and the families of those killed during the riots.

=== 14 May 2007 Murder of Additional Registrar Supreme Court ===
On Monday, 14 May, in the wee hours of dawn, unidentified armed men broke into the house of Syed Hammad Raza, Additional Registrar Supreme Court, in Islamabad and shot him dead at point blank range. According to his wife, Shabana Hammad, the killers did not look for money or other valuables but, instead, asked for Hammad's room and after killing him with a single shot to the head, made good their escape. She claimed that it was a target killing and accused the police of treating it as a robbery case to divert attention from the real culprits. According to the lawyers of Justice Chaudhry, he was very close to the outgoing Chief Justice and was under tremendous pressure from government agencies to testify or divulge information that would incriminate the Chief Justice but had refused to bow to these demands. He had been picked up by men from Pakistani secret agencies in the wake of Justice Chaudhry's suspension and interrogated for several days. An officer of the elite District Management Group, Hammad had impeccable professional credentials and commanded great respect among his peers. He had served in Balochistan Province for several years before he was recalled to the Supreme Court when Justice Chaudhry became the Chief Justice of the apex court.

=== 14 May 2007 case developments ===
One of the judges, Justice Falak Sher, declined to hear the case saying earlier he had objected to Chaudhry's initial appointment as Chief Justice. The court was reconstituted with the remaining eleven Supreme Court judges (Khalil-ur-Rehman Ramday, Muhammad Nawaz Abbasi, Faqir Muhammad Khokhar, Mian Shakirullah Jan, M. Javed Buttar, Tassadduque Hussain Jillani, Saiyed Saeed Ashhad, Nasir-ul-Mulk, Raja Fayyaz Ahmed, Chaudry Ijaz Ahmed, Syed Jamshed Ali) plus two ad-hoc Justices Ghulam Rabbani and Hamid Ali Mirza.

=== 16 May 2007 hearing ===
The hearing of the case is in progress. The president of Pakistan's lawyers told the court that president of Pakistan is not answerable to the court so his name should not be there in the petition lodged by the chief justice of Pakistan. He also argued against the suspension of the SJC.

=== 19 May 2007 Supreme Court work schedule ===
This week supreme court have decided to hear this case regularly four days in a week starting from 21 May 2007.

== Timeline June 2007 ==
=== 9 June 2007 ===
It is well-nigh impossible for them to decipher as to what is true and what is untrue in the three affidavits filed by Lt-Gen (retd) Hamid Javed, CoS to President Musharraf, Maj-Gen Nadeem Ijaz chief of Military Intelligence (MI), and Brig (retd) Ijaz Shah chief of Intelligence Bureau (IB), and the one earlier filed by Chief Justice Iftikhar Muhammad Chaudhry with the full court.

— The News of Pakistan, June 9, 2007

Text of affidavit of Chief of Staff to President
Text of affidavit of DG Military Intelligence
Text of affidavit of IB DG

Three affidavits were filed by government officials against Chief Justice of Pakistan. Aitzaz Ahsan accuses officials of perjury. Talking to reporters after the hearing of the CJP's case in the full court, Aitzaz Ahsan claimed that the government officials' affidavits had several factual mistakes, which showed that the affidavits were "fictitious" and "bogus". Ahsan cited the affidavit of former SC public relations officer Maj (r) Khalid Bilal in which he mentioned Chaudhry as "ineffective chief justice" and advised him not to lead rallies and address bars because the Supreme Judicial Council was hearing his case. Ahsan said that the affidavit showed the date of 8 March when no reference had been filed, the CJP had not been declared ineffective and neither the SJC was hearing any case. "How is it possible that a PRO is narrating events which had not happened till the date when he signed the affidavit ... I am referring to it as an example of bogus affidavit and there are many more which we will disclose before the SC," he added. He said that former Punjab IG and the current Sindh IG had also made errors in their affidavits, which showed that the entire episode was mala fide.

Meanwhile, government's lead counsel Justice (r) Malik Qayyum said on Friday that the SC could cross-examine the heads of the intelligence agencies and other respondents for the verification of their assertions. He, however, opposed the summoning of the CJP, the main respondent in the reference. He told reporters that only the courts could determine the authenticity of the affidavits. He said a false assertion on oath was tantamount to perjury, which is a punishable crime with a maximum imprisonment of three years. After Malik Qayyum completed his arguments Syed Sharifuddin Pirzada gave arguments representing the President of Pakistan who was also a party in the case following which Attorney General Makhdoom Ali Khan gave arguments on Court Notice.

=== 11 June 2007 Government prepares a new reference against the Chief Justice ===
Pakistan's Minister for Law Muhammad Wasi Zafar has that a new reference against Chief Justice Iftikhar Mohammad Chaudhry was ready and it would be filed at an "appropriate time, if needed." The minister said on Sunday the new reference was related to activities of the Chief Justice since the filing of the first reference on 9 March, and the 'facts' contained in the three affidavits submitted by the government in the Supreme Court. He told Pakistani daily Dawn the decision to file a new reference in no way meant the first one was weak, adding that the new document had been formulated by his ministry and was being studied by legal experts.

"Both references are based on facts and the government is meeting its constitutional obligations," the law minister said......."

=== 17 June 2007 Attack on home of Chaudhry's nephew ===
Armed men attacked the house of Advocate Amir Rana, nephew of Chief Justice Iftikhar Mohammad Chaudhry. This was done allegedly after he was warned by someone from intelligence agency named as Brig Zulfiqar.

=== 17 July 2007 Islamabad F-8 attack ===
On 17 July 2007, a bomb was detonated at a rally held in support of the chief justice's efforts against the President. Fifteen people were killed and many were injured as the attack ripped through the Pakistan Peoples Party reception camp. While the government maintained that it was a suicide bomber, Mr Chaudhry's supporters accused the intelligence agencies of planting the bomb. Independent forensic experts also cast doubt on the involvement of a suicide bomber.

=== 20 July 2007 Supreme Court verdict ===
On 20 July 2007, the 13 judge panel from Supreme Court of Pakistan hearing on the case unanimously reinstated the Chief Justice. In a second part of the verdict, the Supreme Court, 10–3, threw out the reference against the Chief Justice filed by President Pervez Musharraf, calling it illegal. In addition Supreme court of Pakistan abolished the law that could send a judge on forced leave, 10–3. This law is not a part of the constitution of Pakistan now. The verdict was seen as a landmark decision which would change the course of judicial history of Pakistan. Iftikhar resumed his work at office on 23 July 2007.

=== 15 March 2009 ===
Nawaz Sharif called off the Long March after securing the reinstatement of the PMLN Punjab Government and unilaterally ended the Long March . He thanked the nation while it was announced that CJ Iftikhar Mohammed Chaudhry would be sworn back in on 21 March.

In a short speech, PM Gilani officially announced that Iftikhar Chaudhry would be reinstated as the Supreme Court Justice. He also announced that Section 144 would be lifted throughout the country. He congratulated the people of Pakistan on this historic occasion.

== Shahbaz Sharif Wikileaks private agreements ==
It Later emerged from Leaked American Diplomatic Cables that Shahbaz Sharif was secretly telling Zardari and Americans that "the future of the then-non-functional chief justice was up for negotiation" and PMLN just wanted a face saving exit. Shahbaz said Chaudhry was a problematic judge whose powers would need to be carefully curtailed. Shahbaz also said Chaudhry could be removed after some sort of face-saving restoration had been carried out. Shahbaz Sharif said PMLN would agree to any constraints President Zardari might want placed on Chaudhry, "including curtailment of his powers to create judicial benches, removal of his suo motu jurisdiction, and/or establishment of a constitutional court as a check on the Supreme Court". Shahbaz said the decision to join the Free Judiciary movement was a reaction to Zardari ending the PMLN government in Punjab Province.

== Clauses under the Constitution of Pakistan ==
=== Article 180 ===
Acting Chief Justice.

At any time when-

(a) the office of Chief Justice of Pakistan is vacant; or
(b) the Chief Justice of Pakistan is absent or is unable to perform the functions of his office due to any other cause,

the President shall appoint [163] [the most senior of the other Judges of the Supreme Court] to act as Chief Justice of Pakistan.

=== Article 209 ===
Supreme Judicial Council.

(1) There shall be a Supreme Judicial Council of Pakistan, in this Chapter referred to as the Council.

(2) The Council shall consist of,

(a) the Chief Justice of Pakistan;
(b) the two next most senior Judges of the Supreme Court; and
(c) the two most senior Chief Justices of High Courts.

Explanation:- For the purpose of this clause, the inter se seniority of the Chief Justices of the High Courts shall be determined with reference to their dates of appointment as Chief Justice [231] [otherwise than as acting Chief Justice], and in case the dates of such appointment are the same, with reference to their dates of appointment as Judges of any of the High Courts.

(3) If at any time the Council is inquiring into the capacity or conduct of a Judge who is a member of the Council, or a member of the Council is absent or is unable to act due to illness or any other cause, then

(a) if such member is a Judge of the Supreme Court, the Judge of the Supreme Court who is next in seniority below the Judges referred to in paragraph (b) of clause (2), and
(b) if such member is the Chief Justice of a High Court; the Chief Justice of another High Court who is next in seniority amongst the Chief Justices of the remaining High Courts, shall act as a member of the Council in his place.

(4) If, upon any matter inquired into by the Council, there is a difference of opinion amongst its members, the opinion of the majority shall prevail, and the report of the Council to the President shall be expressed in terms of the view of the majority.

(5) If, on information [231A] [from any source, the Council or] the President is of the opinion that a Judge of the Supreme Court or of a High Court,

(a) may be incapable of properly performing the duties of his office by reason of physical or mental incapacity; or
(b) may have been guilty of misconduct,

the President shall direct the Council to [231B] [, or the Council may, on its own motion,] inquire into the matter.

(6) If, after inquiring into the matter, the Council reports to the President that it is of the opinion,

(a) that the Judge is incapable of performing the duties of his office or has been guilty of misconduct, and
(b) that he should be removed from office,

the President may remove the Judge from office.

(7) A Judge of the Supreme Court or of a High Court shall not be removed from office except as provided by this Article.

(8) The Council shall issue a code of conduct to be observed by Judges of the Supreme Court and of the High Courts.

However, it is still unclear whether a justice of the highest court of the country can be made "non-functional" in view of Article 180 and Article 209 of the Constitution of Pakistan.
