= Mian Shakirullah Jan =

Pakistani judge (born 1947)

- میاں شاکر اللہ جان

Justice of the Supreme Court of Pakistan
- In office 29 July 2004 – 17 August 2012

Chief Justice Peshawar High Court
- In office 10 January 2002 – 28 July 2004
- Nominated by: Mohammad Rafiq Tarar
- Preceded by: Sardar Muhammad Raza Khan
- Succeeded by: Nasir-ul-Mulk

Justice Peshawar High Court
- In office 13 December 1993 – 9 January 2002

Personal details
- Born: 18 August 1947 (age 79) Peshawar, Pakistan

Supreme Court of Pakistan

Mian Sakirullah Jan (Urdu: میاں شاکر اللہ جان) is a former judge of the Supreme Court of Pakistan and a former Chief Justice of Peshawar High Court. He is the Chairman of the National Industrial Relations Commission.

== Early life ==
Justice Jan was born on 18 August 1947, in Peshawar, Pakistan.

== Education and Training ==
Mian Shakirullah Jan graduated from Islamia College, Peshawar. He obtained a law degree from the Khyber Law College, Peshawar University in 1972.

== Professional career ==
Mian Shakirullah Jan enrolled as an advocate of lower courts in 1973 and of the High Court in 1975. He enrolled as an advocate of the Supreme Court in 1980.

He was appointed Additional Advocate General, NWFP in July 1993.

Justice Mian Shakirullah Jan was elevated as an Additional Judge of the Peshawar High Court on 13 December 1993.

On 28 April 2000, he was appointed as Chief Justice of Peshawar High Court.

He was elevated to the Supreme Court of Pakistan on 29 July 2004.

He was interim Chief Election Commissioner Of Pakistan in 2011.

Interim Chief Justice of Pakistan.

Justice Mian Shakirullah Jan has been:

- Elected unanimously Vice-president of Peshawar Bar Association (1977–1978)
- Elected Secretary Peshawar High Court Bar Association (1979–1980)
- Elected unanimously Secretary of Peshawar Bar Association (1984–1985)
- Elected Vice-President of Peshawar High Court Bar Association (1987–1988)
- Member of the Provincial Bar Council, NWFP Peshawar (1989–1993)
- Member of the Executive Committee Supreme Court Bar Association (1993–1994)

== Controversies ==
=== Reappointment to Supreme Court ===
On 3 November 2007, Chief of Army Staff in Pakistan declared an emergency and issued a Provisional Constitutional Order. A seven-member panel of the Supreme Court of Pakistan, headed by Chief Justice of Pakistan Iftikhar Mohammad Chaudhry and consisting of Justice Rana Bhagwandas, Justice Javed Iqbal, Justice Mian Shakirullah Jan, Justice Nasir-ul-Mulk, Justice Raja Muhammad Fayyaz Ahmad, and Justice Ghulam Rabbani;issued an order that declared the declaration of the emergency order as illegal and prohibited all judges to take any oath on the Provisional Constitutional Order.

Justice Jan refused to take oath on the PCO. As the consequence of his refusal, on 4 December 2007, he was declared to be no longer a Justice of the court and declared to be considered as retired with an effective date of 3 November 2007, without any retirement benefits.

On 5 September 2008, Justice Mian Shakirullah Jan, Tassaduq Hussain Jillani, and Syed Jamshed Ali, who were ousted as result of action of 4 November 2007, were reappointed to the Supreme Court. They took a fresh oath of Office. The controversial aspect of this appointment was that they were given same seniority which they were had on 2 November 2007.

== Important Cases ==
On 28 September 2007, a nine-member bench of Supreme Court of Pakistan, in a 6–3 split verdict held that petition challenging General Pervez Musharraf candidature for the second term as the president as non-maintainable. Justice Mian Shakirullah Jan along with head of bench Justice Rana Bhagwandas and Justice Sardar Muhammad Raza Khan dissented with the majority opinion. Declaring the petition as non-maintainable were Javed Iqbal, Abdul Hameed Dogar, M. Javed Buttar, Muhammad Nawaz Abbasi, Faqir Muhammad Khokhar, and Falak Sher.

On 2 November 2007, Barrister Aitzaz Ahsan submitted an application to the Supreme Court asking that the Government be restrained from imposing martial law in Pakistan. To this application a seven panel Supreme Court bench issued a stay order on 3 November 2007, against the imposition of an emergency. The bench was headed by Chief Justice Iftikhar Mohammad Chaudhry. The other members of the bench were Justice Rana Bhagwandas, Justice Javed Iqbal, Justice Mian Shakirullah Jan, Justice Nasirul Mulk, Justice Raja Fayyaz, and Justice Ghulam Rabbani. This stay order was ignored by the Chief of Army Staff and the emergency was imposed across the country.

Legal offices
Preceded by Sardar Muhammad Raza Khan	Chief Justice of Peshawar High Court; 10 January 2002 – 28 July 2004	Succeeded by Nasir-ul-Mulk
