= 2007 Pakistani state of emergency =

2007 political crisis in Pakistan

A state of emergency was declared by Pakistani president Pervez Musharraf on 3 November 2007 which lasted until 15 December 2007, during which the Constitution of Pakistan was suspended. When the state of emergency was declared, Musharraf controversially held both positions of President and Chief of Army Staff. He later resigned as army chief 25 days into the emergency on 28 November. The state of emergency and its responses are generally attributed to the controversies surrounding the re-election of Musharraf during the presidential election on 6 October 2007, including his holding of both offices of President and Chief of Army Staff at the time.

Chief Justice of Pakistan Iftikhar Muhammad Chaudhry reacted promptly to the emergency declaration, convening a seven-member bench which issued an interim order against this action. He also directed the armed forces of Pakistan not to obey any illegal orders. Subsequently, the 111th Brigade of the Pakistan Army entered the Supreme Court of Pakistan Building and removed Chaudhry and several other judges from the premises and arrested them.

It was announced early that the state of emergency would likely end in late November or early December 2007. After being sworn in for a second presidential term on 29 November 2007, Musharraf immediately declared that the state of emergency would end on 16 December 2007, although the emergency actually ended one day earlier, on 15 December 2007, with an announcement by Musharraf.

The general election previously scheduled to occur in early January 2008 was postponed. At the beginning of the emergency, Information Minister Tariq Azim Khan said on television that the general election could be delayed many months and perhaps up to a year. Later, the election was rescheduled to take place by 15 February 2008, as announced by Musharraf himself. A few days later he called for the election date to be on or before 9 January 2008, before a final date of 8 January 2008, was decided. However, because of unforeseen events that occurred after the state of emergency ended, primarily the assassination of Benazir Bhutto and its aftermath, the general elections were again postponed by the Election Commission, and were finally held on 18 February 2008.

== Background ==
Leading up to the 2007 presidential elections, the Election Commissioner approved General Pervez Musharraf as a candidate for re-election. One of his opponents, retired Supreme Court justice Wajihuddin Ahmed, challenged the ruling in the Supreme Court. The dispute was primarily regarding whether a member of the military was constitutionally permitted to run for the office of the president, as Musharraf held both titles of President and Chief of Army Staff.

Responding to the challenge, on 28 September 2007, Pakistan's Supreme court cleared the way for President Pervez Musharraf to seek another five-year term when it threw out a major legal challenge to his re-election plans. But barred the Election Commission from officially declaring a winner until it made its final decision. On 6 October, presidential elections were held with Musharraf winning 98% votes in the Senate, Parliament and the four provincial assemblies.

While the Supreme Court was hearing the case of Musharraf's eligibility as a candidate, it announced that it would likely need to delay the hearing until 12 November due to a personal engagement of one of the honourable members of the bench. On 2 November, the court reversed its decision to break, stating that it would now reconvene the following Monday on 5 November to attempt to resolve the political situation quickly. This reversal was in part due to criticism that the court's continuing delay was adding to Pakistan's general instability. Convening on 12 November would have left a tight schedule of just three days before the end of Musharraf's previous presidential term on 15 November. Parliamentary elections were due to be held in February 2008, no later than a month after the original target date for elections. The 2008 Pakistani general election was held on 18 February 2008.

Prior to the emergency declaration, Attorney General Malik Qayyum, representing Musharraf, had assured the court that there was no planned move by the government to impose martial law.

== Declaration of a state of emergency ==
Before the court could reach a decision, General Pervez Musharraf, acting as Chief of the Army Staff, declared a state of emergency as per Article 232 of the constitution, on the evening of 3 November 2007, and issued a Provisional Constitutional Order which replaced the country's constitution. The Constitution of Pakistan, Article 232, allows the President of Pakistan to declare a State of Emergency when he is satisfied a situation exists that warrants its imposition. In the case that a President of Pakistan declares a State of Emergency, the National Assembly has to approve it within 30 days. The state-run Pakistan Television Corporation issued a brief announcement saying that, "The Chief of the Army Staff (General Musharraf) has proclaimed state of emergency and issued a provisional constitutional order," at 6:10 am local time without giving any details. Under the order, the Constitution was suspended, the federal cabinet ceased to exist, and the justices were ordered to take an oath to abide by it. Those who failed to do so would be dismissed.

=== Text of the Proclamation of Emergency ===
Following is the text of the Proclamation of Emergency declared by Chief of the Army Staff Gen Pervez Musharraf:

WHEREAS there is visible ascendancy in the activities of extremists and incidents of terrorist attacks, including suicide bombings, IED explosions, rocket firing and bomb explosions and the banding together of some militant groups have taken such activities to an unprecedented level of violent intensity posing a grave threat to the life and property of the citizens of Pakistan;

WHEREAS there has also been a spate of attacks on state infrastructure and on law-enforcement agencies;

WHEREAS some members of the judiciary are working at cross purposes with the executive and legislature in the fight against terrorism and extremism, thereby weakening the government and the nation's resolve and diluting the efficacy of its actions to control this menace;

WHEREAS there has been increasing interference by some members of the judiciary in government policy, adversely affecting economic growth, in particular;

WHEREAS constant interference in executive functions, including but not limited to the control of terrorist activity, economic policy, price controls, downsizing of corporations and urban planning, has weakened the writ of the government; the police force has been completely demoralized and is fast losing its efficacy to fight terrorism and intelligence agencies have been thwarted in their activities and prevented from pursuing terrorists;

WHEREAS some hard-core militants, extremists, terrorists and suicide bombers, who were arrested and being investigated, were ordered to be released. The persons so released have subsequently been involved in heinous terrorist activities, resulting in loss of human life and property. Militants across the country have, thus, been encouraged while law-enforcement agencies subdued;

WHEREAS some judges by overstepping the limits of judicial authority have taken over the executive and legislative functions;

WHEREAS the government is committed to the independence of the judiciary and the rule of law and holds the superior judiciary in high esteem, it is nonetheless of paramount importance that the honourable judges confine the scope of their activity to the judicial function and not assume charge of administration;

WHEREAS an important constitutional institution, the Supreme Judicial Council, has been made entirely irrelevant and non-est by a recent order and judges have, thus, made themselves immune from inquiry into their conduct and put themselves beyond accountability;

WHEREAS the humiliating treatment meted to government officials by some members of the judiciary on a routine basis during court proceedings has demoralised the civil bureaucracy and senior government functionaries, to avoid being harassed, prefer inaction;

WHEREAS the law and order situation in the country as well as the economy have been adversely affected and trichotomy of powers eroded;

WHEREAS a situation has thus arisen where the government of the country cannot be carried on in accordance with the Constitution and as the Constitution provides no solution for this situation, there is no way out except through emergent and extraordinary measures;

AND WHEREAS the situation has been reviewed in meetings with the prime minister, governors of all four provinces, and with Chairman of Joint Chiefs of Staff Committee, Chiefs of the Armed Forces, Vice-Chief of Army Staff and Corps Commanders of the Pakistan Army; NOW, THEREFORE, in pursuance of the deliberations and decisions of the said meetings, I, General Pervez Musharraf, Chief of the Army Staff, proclaim Emergency throughout Pakistan.

2. I, hereby, order and proclaim that the Constitution of the Islamic Republic of Pakistan shall remain in abeyance.

This Proclamation shall come into force at once.

=== Text of Provisional Constitutional Order 2007 ===
Following is the text of the Provisional Constitutional Order (PCO) promulgated by Chief of the Army Staff Gen Pervez Musharraf:

In pursuance of the Proclamation of the 3rd day of November, 2007, and in exercise of all powers enabling him in that behalf, the Chief of Army Staff, under the Proclamation of Emergency of the 3rd day of November, 2007, is pleased to make and promulgate the following Order:

(1) This Order may be called the Provisional Constitution Order No 1 of 2007.

(2) It extends to the whole of Pakistan.

(3) It shall come into force at once.

2. (1) Notwithstanding the abeyance of the provisions of the Constitution of the Islamic Republic of Pakistan, hereinafter referred to as the Constitution, Pakistan shall, subject to this Order and any other Order made by the President, be governed, as nearly as may be, in accordance with the Constitution.

Provided that the President may, from time to time, by Order amend the Constitution, as is deemed expedient:

Provided farther that the Fundamental Rights, under Articles 9, 10, 15,16,17,19 and 25, shall remain suspended.

(2) Notwithstanding anything contained in the Proclamation of the 3rd day of November, 2007, or this Order or any other law for the time being in force, all provisions of the Constitution of the Islamic Republic of Pakistan embodying Islamic injunctions including Articles 2, 2A, 31, 2O3A, 227 to 231 and 260 (3) (a) and (b) shall continue to be in force.

(3) Subject to clause (1) above and the Oath of Office (Judges) Order, 2007, all courts in existence immediately before the commencement of this Order shall continue to function and to exercise their respective powers and jurisdiction:

Provided that the Supreme Court or a High Court and any other court shall not have the power to make any order against the President or the Prime Minister or any person exercising powers or jurisdiction under their authority.

(4) All persons who immediately before the commencement of this Order were in office as judges of the Supreme Court, the Federal Shariat Court or a High Court, shall be governed by and be subject to the Oath of Office (Judges) Order, 2007, and such further Orders as the President may pass.

(5) Subject to clause (1) above, the Majlis-i-Shoora (Parliament) and the Provincial Assemblies shall continue to function.

(6) All persons who, immediately before the commencement of this Order, were holding any service, post or office in connection with the affairs of the federation or of a province, including an All Pakistan Service, service in the armed forces and any other service declared to be a service of Pakistan by or under Act of Majlis-i-Shoora (Parliament) or of a Provincial Assembly, or Chief Election Commissioner or Auditor General, shall continue in the said service on the same terms and conditions and shall enjoy the same privileges, if any, unless these are changed under Orders of the President.

3. (1) No court, including the Supreme Court, the Federal Shariat Court, and the High Courts, and any tribunal or other authority, shall call or permit to be called in question this Order, the Proclamation of Emergency of the 3rd day of November, 2007, the Oath of Office (Judges) Order, 2007, or any Order made in pursuance thereof.

(2) No judgment, decree, writ, order or process whatsoever shall be made or issued by any court or tribunal against the President or the Prime Minister or any authority designated by the President.

4. (1) Notwithstanding the abeyance of the provisions of the Constitution, but subject to the Orders of the President, all laws other than the Constitution, all ordinances, orders, rules, bye-laws, regulations, notifications and other legal instruments in force in any part

of Pakistan, whether made by the President or the governor of a province, shall continue in force until altered, or repealed by the President or any authority designated by him.

5. (1) Any ordinance promulgated by the President or by the governor of a province shall not be subject to any limitations as to duration prescribed in the Constitution.

(2) The provisions of clause (1) shall also apply to an ordinance issued by the President or by a governor which was in force immediately before the commencement of the Proclamation of Emergency of the 3rd day of November, 2007. ->

== Supreme Court validates Presidential elections, PCO and emergency ==
On 24 November 2007, a seven panel larger bench of the Supreme Court, headed by Chief Justice Abdul Hameed Dogor, directed the chief election commissioner and the government to declare Pervez Musharraf President for a second term by 1 December, and said that President Musharraf shall relinquish the office of the chief of army staff (COAS) before taking oath as civilian president. The Supreme Court also validated the imposition of emergency and the promulgation of the Provisional Constitution Order issued by the Chief of the Army Staff. The larger bench held that President General Musharraf was qualified to contest the presidential election and did not suffer any disqualification under the constitution and the law. The court also vacated the interim stay of the 6 October presidential election results that had kept the Election Commission from announcing them until now. The bench was headed by Chief Justice Abdul Hameed Dogar. The other members were Justice Ejazul Hassan, Justice Muhammad Qaim Jan Khan, Justice Muhammad Moosa K Laghari, Justice Chaudhry Ejaz Yousaf, Justice Muhammad Akhtar Shabbir, and Justice Zia Pervez.

Later, on 15 February 2008, the Supreme Court delivered a detailed judgement to validate the Proclamation of Emergency on 3 November 2007, the Provisional Constitution Order No 1 of 2007 and the Oath of Office (Judges) Order, 2007. This Full Court judgement was written by Chief Justice Abdul Hameed Dogar. Other members of the Full Court were Justice Ijaz-ul-Hassan, Justice Mohammad Qaim Jan Khan, Justice Mohammad Moosa K. Leghari, Justice Chaudhry Ejaz Yousaf, Justice Muhammad Akhtar Shabbir and Justice Zia Perwez. The Supreme Court wrote, "In the recent past the whole of Pakistan was afflicted with extremism, terrorism and suicide attacks using bombs, hand grenades, missiles, mines, including similar attacks on the armed forces and law enforcing agencies, which reached climax on 18th of October 2007 when in a similar attack on a public rally, at least 150 people were killed and more than 500 seriously injured. The situation which led to the issuance of Proclamation of Emergency of the 3rd day of November 2007 as well as the other two Orders, referred to above, was similar to the situation which prevailed in the country on the 5th of July 1977 and the 12th of October 1999 warranting the extra-constitutional steps, which had been validated by the Supreme Court of Pakistan in Begum Nusrat Bhutto V. Chief of the Army Staff (PLD 1977 SC 657) and Syed Zafar Ali Shah V. Pervez Musharraf, Chief Executive of Pakistan (PLD 2000 SC 869) in the interest of the State and for the welfare of the people, as also the fact that the Constitution was not abrogated, but merely held in abeyance"

It further wrote, "The learned Chief Justices and Judges of the superior courts, (Supreme Court of Pakistan, Federal Shariat Court and the High Courts), who have not been given, and who have not made, oath under the Oath of Office (Judges) Order, 2007 have ceased to hold their respective offices on the 3rd of November 2007. Their cases cannot be re-opened being hit by the doctrine of past and closed transaction."

== Supreme Court and PCO 2007 ==
On 2 November 2007, Barrister Aitzaz Ahsan submitted an application to the Supreme Court asking that the Government be restrained from imposing martial law in Pakistan.

To this application a seven panel Supreme Court bench issued a stay order on 3 November 2007 against the imposition of an emergency. The bench was headed by Chief Justice Iftikhar Mohammad Chaudhry. The other members of the bench were Justice Rana Bhagwandas, Justice Javed Iqbal, Justice Mian Shakirullah Jan, Justice Nasirul Mulk, Justice Raja Fayyaz, and Justice Ghulam Rabbani. This stay order was ignored by the Chief of Army Staff and the emergency was imposed across the country.

Provisional Constitutional Order effecting the Judicature of Pakistan
Senior Justices of the Supreme Court of Pakistan	Appointment	Retirement	Actions on New PCO (2007)	Aftermath (2009)
Chief Justice I.M. Chaudhry	4 February 2000	11 December 2013	Refused to take an oath	Restored
Senior Justice Rana Bhagwandas	4 February 2000	20 December 2007	Refused to take an oath	Resigned
Senior Justice Javed Iqbal	28 April 2000	31 July 2011	Refused to take an oath	Restored
Senior Justice A.H. Dogar	28 April 2000	21 March 2009	Took an oath	Appointed Chief Justice
Senior Justice S.M.R. Khan	10 January 2002	9 February 2010	Refused to take an oath	Restored
Senior Justice K.R. Ramday	10 January 2002	12 January 2010	Refused to take an oath	Restored
Senior Justice M.N. Abbasi	10 January 2002	7 June 2008	Took an oath	Restrained in 2009
Senior Justice F.M. Khokar	10 January 2002	15 April 2010	Took an oath	Restrained in 2009
Senior Justice Falak Sher	9 June 2002	21 September 2008	Refused to take an oath	Resigned
Senior Justice M.S. Jan	31 July 2004	17 August 2012	Refused to take an oath	Restored
Senior Justice M.J. Buttar	31 July 2004	17 August 2012	Refused to take an oath	Restored
Senior Justice T.H. Jillani	31 July 2004	5 July 2014	Refused to take an oath	Restored
Senior Justice S.S. Arshad	5 April 2005	7 October 2008	Took oath an oath	Restrained in 2009
Senior Justice Nasir-ul-Mulk	5 April 2005	16 August 2015	Refused to take an oath	Restored
Senior Justice R.M.F. Ahmad	14 September 2005	31 May 2011	Refused to take an oath	Restored
Senior Justice Ch. Ijaz Ahmad	14 September 2005	4 May 2010	Refused to take an oath	Restored
Senior Justice S.J. Ali	14 September 2005	30 September 2008	Refused to take an oath	Restored
Senior Justice Ghulam Rabbani	14 September 2006	N/A	Refused to take an oath	Restored

== Speech to the nation ==
President Musharraf addresses Pakistan for the first time since state of emergency was announced, shown here on CNN-IBN.

Early Sunday morning Pervez Musharraf addressed Pakistan for the first time since declaring the state of emergency in a speech broadcast on state-run PTV. The following is a translation of Musharraf's speech from the original Urdu:

Today I make this address because our country is at a dangerous juncture, facing a national crisis. Throughout history, nations have often had to make difficult decisions. That time has come now for Pakistan – we have to make important and painful decisions. If these decisions are not made then Pakistan's future is at stake.

Before saying anything further, I promise that the decision I have made is, first of all, for the sake of Pakistan. Pakistan is above all personal interests. The people of Pakistan should agree with me on this.

In the last few months, our situation has changed dramatically. Terrorism and Extremism are rampant. Suicide bombings are widespread. In Karachi, Rawalpindi, Sargodha, fanaticism is now common. Fundamentalist extremists are everywhere. They are not afraid of law-enforcement agencies.

What was confined to the frontier areas, has now extended to many other areas. Extremism has spread even to Islamabad – the heart of Pakistan.

The people are worried. The extremists are trying to take the authority and power of the government into their own hands. They want to impose their outdated religious views upon the people.

In my eyes, this is a direct challenge to Pakistan's future as a moderate nation.

Musharraf also referred to US President Abraham Lincoln, saying that Lincoln's suspension of Habeas corpus during the American Civil War to save the nation was analogous to his declaration of a state of emergency for Pakistan.

Musharraf said that the forthcoming election date will not be affected by the declaration.

== Impact on higher judiciary ==
The judges of Supreme Court, Federal Shariat Court and four High Courts were asked to take an oath on the PCO. Some of the judges opted to take the oath on the PCO immediately, while some took it over a period of time and some remained steadfast in refusing to take the oath on the PCO.

Immediately after the emergency, out of 18 Supreme Court justices, only five judges took the oath on the PCO. Initially in Islamabad, Abdul Hameed Dogar who was inducted as the new Chief Justice, Muhammad Nawaz Abbasi, Justice Khokhar and M. Javed Buttar took the oath under the PCO. Later in the evening, in Karachi Saiyed Saeed Ashhad also took the oath on the PCO on 3 November 2007. From the remaining judges, Justice Javed Iqbal, Justice Falak Sher, Justice Sardar Muhammad Raza Khan, Justice Mian Shakir Ullah Jan, Justice Tassaduq Hussain Jillani, Justice Nasir ul Mulk, Justice Chaudhry Ejaz Ahmed, Justice Raja Fayyaz, Justice Syed Jamshed Ali and Justice Ghulam Rabbani declined invitation to take oath of supreme court took oath on PCO. The Chief Justice Iftikhar Muhammad Chaudhry, Justice Rana Bhagwandas and Justice Khalil-ur-Rehman Ramday also did not take oath on PCO nor were they offered to.

On 3 December 2007, the federal government issued a notification of removal of three justices of the Supreme Court without any retirement privileges. They were Chief Justice Iftikhar Muhammad Chaudhry, Justice Rana Bhagwandas and Justice Khalil-ur-Rehman Ramday.

On 3 December 2007, the federal government issued another notification that in pursuance to Article 3 of the Oath of Office (Judges) Order, 2007 (Order No. 1 of 2007), 24 judges of the High Courts of Sindh, Punjab and NWFP had ceased to hold office, with effect from 3 November 2007, the day emergency was proclaimed in the country.

According to the notification twelve justices of Sindh High Court were notified to cease to hold office. They were Justice Rahmat Hussain Jafferi, Justice Khilji Arif Hussain, Justice Aamir Hani Muslim, Justice Gulzar Ahmed, Justice Maqbool Baqar, Justice Muhammad Athar Saeed, Justice Faisal Arab, Justice Sajjad Ali Shah, Justice Zafar Ahmed Khan Sherwani, Justice Salman Ansari, Justice Abdul Rashid Kalwar and Justice Arshad Siraj.

According to the notification ten justices of Lahore High Court were notified to cease to hold office. They were Justice Khawja Muhammad Sharif, Justice Mian Saqib Nisar, Justice Asif Saeed Khan Khosa, Justice Muhammad Tahir Ali, Justice Ijaz Ahmad Chaudhry, Justice M. A. Shahid Siddiqui, Justice Muhammad Jehangir Arshad, Justice Sheikh Azmat Saeed, Justice Umar Atta Bandial and Justice Iqbal Hameed-ur-Rehman.

According to the notification two justices of Peshawar High Court were notified to cease to hold office. They were Justice Ijaz Afzal Khan and Justice Dost Muhammad Khan.

All justices of the High Court of Balochistan took the oath on the PCO.

== Events during the state of emergency ==
Opinion polls reflected strong public opposition to imposition of the state of emergency. 67% demanded General Musharraf's resignation whereas 71% said they opposed the suspension of Constitution. More than 70% people surveyed said that they were opposed to closure of private television channels, arrest of Chief Justices and mass arrests.

=== Islamabad ===
International broadcasts and local phones were blocked in some locations. Additionally, barriers and barbed wires were erected at important points in the capital.

Aitzaz Ahsan, a member of the Pakistan Peoples Party (PPP), attorney and president of the Supreme Court Bar Association, was arrested at his home. Key opposition figures and senior lawyers were also placed under house arrest. All were released within a few days.

Hundreds of students joined in protests led by faculty of Quaid-e-Azam University; they were joined by scores of civil rights activists. Police presence forced students to 'flash demonstrations' and prompt disbanding.

=== Lahore ===
After the announcement of emergency, police acted swiftly to arrest thousands of lawyers, human rights activists and politicians. Crackdowns were made throughout the night of 3 November to thwart any opposition.

All members of the Human Rights Commission of Pakistan, including Asma Jehangir and Salima Hashmi were jailed. The Mall Road, where official buildings including Secretariat, Governor House, and the High Court are, remained barricaded at a number of points.

There were protests at all universities of the city, Pakistan's leading university LUMS, Punjab University, Beaconhouse National University, National College of Arts, Government College, Forman Christian College and others. The students also led the fight on the internet where thousands of blogs unanimously denounced the State of Emergency.

=== Gujranwala ===
After the announcement of emergency, Heavy contingents of police were deployed on G.T Road, Sialkot road, Civil lines and Cantonment. Hundreds of lawyers, civil rights activists, journalists, media persons and political activists protested.

=== Faisalabad ===
Heavy contingents of police were deployed in the eight major bazaars of the city and the district courts. Hundreds of lawyers, civil rights activists, journalists, media persons and political activists protested, prompting brutal use of force and baton charging by police. Police also sealed the courts and the press club.

=== Sialkot ===
Opposition leader Khawaja Muhammad Asif, Member of the National Assembly (MNA), was placed under house arrest shortly after the declaration of emergency. He had been arrested, by order of the Pakistani Army, and taken to an undisclosed location. Khawaja Asif is a member of the Pakistan Muslim League (N) (PML-N), the party headed by exiled Prime Minister Nawaz Sharif. He was elected for his third term as MNA from a PML-N seat and is currently a member of the Parliament of Pakistan.

=== Peshawar ===
Army pickets were established in Peshawar, the capital of North-West Frontier Province bordering Afghanistan. Hundreds of protesters joined processions led by the local Awami National party forcing police to arrest all local political leadership of opposition parties to crush demonstrations.

=== Karachi ===
Reports from inside Karachi stated that the situation remained peaceful and not entirely different from any other weekend.

=== Quetta ===
Nationalist opposition leaders Mehmood Khan Achakzai and Qadir Magsi were detained in their home towns in southern Pakistan. The police also picked up five lawyers from southwestern Quetta, who were known as staunch supporters of Chaudhry.

- BBC: On 3 November 2007, BBC opened debate on the Emergency and more than 10,000 comments were received, many against emergency rule.BBC
- By the end of 5 November 2007 over 3,500 people had been arrested. Most of these were lawyers, civil rights leaders and members of the political parties. But almost all of them were soon released and by the time the emergency ended, all arrested had been released. UN High Commissioner for Human Rights Louise Arbour also reported that a Pakistani UN official, Asma Jahangir, was among the judicial and political officials detained. The vast majority of the detained were released within a two-week period and the remainder released in the following days.
- On 14 November 2007, former cricketer and Opposition Leader Imran Khan (who was elected Prime Minister 11 years later) arrived at Punjab University to take part in a protest with the students. However, Imran Khan's presence enraged some students, who felt he was attempting to take credit for their efforts and also because the students had previously made it clear that politicians were not welcome in their protests. As a result, some students of youth organisation Islami Jamiat-e-Talaba, a part of the Jamaat-e-Islami party manhandled Imran Khan soon after his arrival, locked him up in the University for around two hours, and later handed him over to the local police. The police arrested him and sent him to the Dera Ghazi Khan jail in Punjab province where he spent a few days before being released.
- While some Pakistani expatriates called 3 November 2007 a Black Day in the History of Pakistan, when General Musharraf declared a state of emergency in Pakistan, other expatriate Pakistanis supported Musharraf's decision to impose a brief emergency rule in Pakistan and held pro-Musharraf rallies in London, Toronto, Brussels, and other Western cities.

== Ban on media ==
With the imposition of emergency a media blackout followed. National channels like ARY One World, GEO TV, Aaj News, and other channels were also blocked. General Musharraf maintained that these channels were creating discord, misrepresenting facts, were not responsible, and were contributing to the instability of the nation. The Government also cracked down on international channels like BBC and CNN. ARY reported that authorities in Dubai had asked the network's administration to close down its operations. The network said no reason had been given for the move.

The government expelled three journalists from the British newspaper The Daily Telegraph after calling general Musharraf "our son of a bitch". This is an allusion to Franklin D. Roosevelt's defence of Nicaragua's heavy-handed but U.S.-backed dictator, Anastasio Somoza García. However this is still viewed as an extremely severe insult in Pakistan.

On 21 November 2007 two thousand detainees under the Emergency were released, but 3,000 remained in detention, according to London's Metro newspaper. Musharraf's Govt. also arrested moderate groups of society such as human rights activists and lawyers.

== Effect on the economy ==
The Pakistani stock market was the first to react, with the Karachi Stock Exchange (KSE) falling by more than 4.6% on the first day of the emergency.

Investors in the United Kingdom pulled back $26.27 million while investors in the United States withdrew $51.93 million. It is estimated that more than $235 million in total were withdrawn from the KSE during the emergency.

Standard & Poor's Ratings Services also revised its outlook on the long-term foreign and local currency sovereign credit ratings of Pakistan from stable to negative.

The Dutch government froze development aid to Pakistan in response to the imposition of emergency rule. Deputy Minister for Development Bert Koenders decided to suspend the remainder of the €15 million (US$22 million) that had yet to be paid in 2007.

== Reaction ==
=== Pakistan ===
==== Opposition leaders ====
The AP reported that Benazir Bhutto was greeted by supporters chanting slogans at the airport. After staying in her plane for several hours she was driven to her home in Karachi, accompanied by hundreds of supporters. On 8 November, Bhutto was placed under house arrest by the Pakistani government. After one day the house arrest was lifted. Bhutto said that the election date set of 15 February 2008 was "too vague" and planned to undertake a "long march" in car procession around Pakistan, as she did before, protesting against Nawaz Sharif. The Army cautioned her against this, citing the risk of further suicide bomb attacks. On 12 November 2007 she was again placed under house arrest for a week to prevent this happening. Musharraf also gave the election date as 9 January 2008. Bhutto rejected this as being too soon after emergency rule. Subsequently, Bhutto was released from house arrest again, but the Daily Jang (20 Nov.07) reported the Attorney General, Mohammed Qayyum as saying that five writs were to be heard to revoke her immunity from prosecution on corruption charges, which claim that only the judiciary had the right to grant immunity not President Musharraf. Qayyum described them as "likely to succeed". Bhutto had by 25 November filed nomination papers for 8 January elections, despite not confirming her intention to boycott them.

Former Prime Minister Nawaz Sharif said that "Imposing emergency is another form of terrorism." The acting head of the former Prime Minister's political party, Javed Hashmi, who was arrested, stated, "People will win. Generals will lose. They have to surrender." On 23 November 2007 it was announced in The Guardian that Nawaz Sharif would return to Pakistan after the King of Saudi Arabia reportedly told Musharraf that they would not keep him in Saudi Arabia and he landed in Lahore on 25 November in a Saudi aircraft, with his wife, Kulsoom and brother Shehbaz. He said that he wishes to restore democracy from dictatorship, but did not say whether he would boycott the elections in January. Neither did Bhutto, but she had already filed nomination papers. Sharif filed nomination papers the day after his return, but said that he would not serve as Prime Minister under Musharraf.

The Minister of the State for Information, Tariq Azim Khan, said on television media that the elections in Pakistan scheduled for January would be delayed indefinitely. President Musharraf later announced that elections would be held by mid-February.

==== Judges ====
The new Provisional Constitutional Order required judges to retake an oath of allegiance to Musharraf. Many refused to do so, including 15 Supreme Court judges. Additionally, only a fraction of the judges in Pakistan's provinces took the new oath: in Punjab 12 out of 31, in Sindh 4 out of 27, in the North-West Frontier Province 7 out of 15, and in Balochistan 5 out of 11 retook their oaths.

On 6 November Pakistan's Chief Justice Iftikhar Chaudhry, who was under house arrest, spoke by phone to a group of 500 lawyers. In his statement he said that the constitution had been "ripped to shreds" and that the people should "rise up and restore" it. He added that while he is under guard, he will soon "join you in your struggle."

It was alleged that the government used blackmail to get judges to take oath under the new PCO. Videos were sent out to at least three of the 11 judges as they were whether General Pervez Musharraf was eligible to run for president.

Around 60 judges refused to take the oath under the "PCO", which includes a statement that no judgment can be passed against any government even if found guilty.

On 20 November 2007 it was reported in the Daily Jang that a newly appointed Supreme Court had dismissed five writs challenging Musharraf's confirmation as president and was waiting to adjudicate the sixth. Another from the Pakistan Peoples Party was withdrawn as the originators do not recognise the new court. The Court has threatened to revoke the licence of any lawyer not recognising its authority. Packing the Supreme Court with supporters is not unusual. Previously Musharraf appointed Iftikar Chaudhry as his nominee and the previous prime minister Nawaz Sharif also packed the judiciary with his sympathizers.

All judges were restored after elections were held.

==== Religious leaders ====
Qazi Hussain Ahmed called for protests to overthrow "the military dictator," during a speech near the outside of Lahore to 20,000 of his followers. He is an Islamic leader of MMA, a religious alliance opposing Musharraf.

==== Lawyer community strike ====
Deposed chief justice Iftikhar Muhammad Chaudhry called on lawyers nationwide on 11 November to defy baton-wielding police and protest President Gen. Pervez Musharraf's imposition of emergency rule.

"Go to every corner of Pakistan and give the message that this is the time to sacrifice," Iftikhar Muhammad Chaudhry, who is under virtual house arrest in Islamabad, told lawyers by mobile phone. "Don't be afraid. God will help us and the day will come when you'll see the constitution supreme and no dictatorship for a long time."

The President of the Supreme Court Bar Association and other legal leaders were taken into custody immediately after the imposition of emergency rule. As a result, the Pakistan lawyer community called for a nationwide strike on 5 November 2007 against Musharraf's decision to impose emergency rule.

=== International ===
The immediate response from most countries was critical, with the measures viewed as running counter to liberal-democratic reforms.

== PCO Judges case ==
On 31 July 2009, the Supreme Court of Pakistan declared the steps taken on 3 November 2007, by former president Pervez Musharraf as illegal and unconstitutional under the Article 279 of the Constitution. The judgment came after the 14-judge larger bench headed by Chief Justice of Pakistan Justice Iftikhar Muhammed Chaudhry completed the hearing of constitutional petitions regarding PCO judges, appointments of judges of higher judiciary and 3 November 2007, steps. The decision's short announcement also stated that the results of 2008 Pakistani general election, held on 18 February, will be given judicial protection and that President Asif Ali Zardari will not have to take a presidential oath again. However the court has some reservations about how the Ordinances including the controversial National Reconstruction Ordinance (NRO), were handled by the interim Supreme Court during the emergency Period, but present government was given 120 days to regularise them through parliament.

Lawyers and advocates celebrated after the announcement was made by the Supreme Court of Pakistan. Musharraf was summoned by the court, but his lawyers did not appear because in their opinion he did not receive the court summons. The verdict was also welcomed by the spokesperson to the President former Senator Farhatullah Babar who said that "The Supreme Court short order today declaring the 3 November 2007 actions of General Pervez Musharraf as unconstitutional is a triumph of the democratic principles, a stinging negation of dictatorship and is most welcome."

== Criminal indictment ==
On 17 December 2019, a death sentence high treason was handed down to Musharraf in exile, for suspending the Constitution in 2007. The verdict, which was handed down by a three-member panel of the special court, headed by the chief judge of the Peshawar High Court, Waqar Ahmed Seth, was later overruled by Lahore High Court on 13 January 2020 but on 10 January 2024 Supreme court set aside Lahore Highcourt judgement bad reinstate death plenty of General Musaraf. A four member bench headed by Chief Justice Qazi Faez Isa declared LHC judgment unconstitutional and against the law and Question the conduct of Judges who give relief to General Musaraf. The Bench of Lahore High court was headed by Justice Mazahar Ali Akbar Naqvi, who was later promoted to supreme court has been recently dismissed by supreme judicial council in case of misconduct and Corruption.

== See also ==
- 1999 Pakistani coup d'état
- Coup d'etat
- Benazir Bhutto assassination

== Literature ==
- Schoresch Davoodi & Adama Sow: The Political Crisis of Pakistan in 2007 – EPU Research Papers: Issue 08/07, Stadtschlaining 2007
- Anil Kalhan, Constitution and 'Extraconstitution': Emergency Powers in Postcolonial Pakistan and India, in Emergency Powers in Asia (Victor Ramraj & Arun Thiruvengadam eds., Cambridge University Press, 2010)
- Anil Kalhan, "Gray Zone" Constitutionalism and the Dilemma of Judicial Independence in Pakistan, 46 Vanderbilt Journal of Transnational Law 1 (2013)
