= Provisional Constitutional Order =

Constitutional Order in Pakistan

Martial law
- Territorial extent: Whole of State of Pakistan
- Enacted by: Martial law
- Administered by: Chief Martial Law Administrator
- White paper: Constitution Petition No. 8 & 9 of 2009

Legislative history
- Introduced by: Zia regime
- Introduced: 25 March 1981
- First reading: 14 October 1999
- Second reading: 7 November 2007

Related legislation
- 18th Amendment
- Status: Not fully in force

The Provisional Constitutional Order (PCO) is an emergency and extra-constitutional order that suspends either wholly or partially the Constitution of Pakistan — the supreme law of the land.

The PCO acts as a temporary order while the constitution is held in abeyance or suspension. These orders have mostly been enforced during times of martial law imposed by the armed forces of the country against the civilian governments.

== Overview of Provisional Constitutional Order ==
=== Provisional Constitutional Order, 1981 ===
Soon after Chief of Army Staff General Zia-ul-Haq imposed martial law in 1977, the Constitution of Pakistan was suspended. The first Provisional Constitutional Order (PCO) was declared on March 24, 1981, by the army chief and military dictator Zia-ul-Haq.

Under this new order, the senior justices of the Supreme Court of Pakistan were asked to take an oath of office under the provisions set by the PCO. In March 1981, President Zia terminated 19 senior justices of the Supreme Court when they refused to take the oath. Chief Justice Dorab Patel and Senior Justice Fakhruddin G. Ebrahim declined to take the oath, thus opting for retirement. Senior Justice Sheikh Anwarul Haq also resigned after refusing to take the oath, while Senior Justice Maulvi Mushtaq Hussain, who was willing to take the oath, was not asked to do so.

Senior Justices Hussain and Haq had previously approved Zulfikar Ali Bhutto's hanging and were reportedly restrained from taking the oath under the secretive directives issued by President Zia. All of these senior justices were asked to tender their resignation, which they did.

Provisional Constitutional Order effecting the Judicature of Pakistan
Senior Justices of the Supreme Court of Pakistan	Oath of Office	Extension under PCO
Chief Justice Dorab Patel	Refused to take oath under PCO	Resigned
Chief Justice Anwarul Haq	Took oath under PCO	Resigned
Senior Justice Fakhruddin Ebrahim	Refused to take oath under PCO	Resigned
Senior Justice Abdul Kadir Shaikh	Took oath under PCO	Continuation at Supreme Court
Senior Justice Mohammad Haleem	Took oath under PCO	Elevated as Chief Justice (1981–89)
Senior Justice K.I. Chouhann	Took oath under PCO	Continuation at Supreme Court
Senior Justice Aslam Riaz Hussain	Took oath under PCO	Continuation at Supreme Court
Senior Justice Nasim Shah	Took oath under PCO	Elevated as Chief Justice (1993–94)
Senior Justice Shafi-u-Rehman	Took oath under PCO	Continuation at Supreme Court
Senior Justice Maulvi Mushtaq Hussain	Not invited to take oath under PCO	Resigned
Senior Justice M.A. Zulla	Took oath under PCO	Elevated as Chief Justice (1993–94)
Senior Justice Agha Ali Hyder	Not invited to take oath under PCO	Appointed at the Federal Shariat Court
Senior Justice Abdul Hayee Qureshi	Took oath under PCO	Appointed at the Sindh High Court
Senior Justice Abdul Hafeez Memon	Refused to take oath under PCO	Appointed at the Sindh High Court
Senior Justice Zaffar Hussain Mirza	Took oath under PCO	Appointed at the Sindh High Court
Senior Justice Naimuddin Ahmed	Took oath under PCO	Appointed at Supreme Court
Senior Justice S.A. Nusrat	Took oath under PCO	Appointed at Supreme Court
Senior Justice G. M. Shah	Not invited to take oath under PCO	Resigned
Senior Justice Ajmal Mian	Took oath under PCO	Elevated as Chief Justice (1997–99)
Senior Justice Muhammad Zahoor-ul-Haq	Took oath under PCO	Appointed at the Sindh High Court
Senior Justice Sajjad A. Shah	Took oath under PCO	Elevated as Chief Justice (1994–97)
Senior Justice Ghous Ali Shah	Took oath under PCO	Resigned
Senior Justice Tanzil-ur-Rahman	Took oath under PCO	Appointed at the Federal Shariat Court
Senior Justice Saeeduzzaman Siddiqui	Took oath under PCO	Elevated as Chief Justice (1999–00)
Senior Justice G.M. Kourejo	Took oath under PCO	Appointed at the Sindh High Court
Senior Justice Nasir A. Zahid	Took oath under PCO	Appointed at the Sindh High Court
Senior Justice K.A. Ghani	Took oath under PCO	Appointed at the Sindh High Court
Senior Justice Saleem Akhtar	Took oath under PCO	Resigned

=== Provisional Constitutional Order, 1999 ===
In the wake of political tensions arising after the border incidents with India that nearly pushed the two countries to the brink of war, Chairman Joint Chiefs of Staff Committee and Chief of Army Staff General Pervez Musharraf imposed martial law against the government of Prime Minister Nawaz Sharif on October 12, 1999.

General Musharraf effectively imposed a state of emergency and suspended the Constitution after introducing the Provisional Order. Nearly all senior justices were required to take an oath of office under this new order, and concerns were raised that this would "erode the independence of the judiciary".

Provisional Constitutional Order effecting the Judicature of Pakistan
Senior Justices of the Supreme Court of Pakistan	Oath of Office	Extension under PCO
Chief Justice Saeeduzzaman Siddiqui	Refused to take oath under PCO	Resigned
Senior Justice Sheikh Ejaz Nisar	Took oath under PCO	Continuation at Supreme Court
Senior Justice Bashir Jehangiri	Took oath under PCO	Elevated as Chief Justice (2002–02)
Senior Justice Irshad Hasan Khan	Took oath under PCO	Elevated as Chief Justice (2000–02)
Senior Justice Sh. Riaz Ahmad	Took oath under PCO	Elevated as Chief Justice (2002–05)
Senior Justice Mamoon A Kazi	Refused to take oath under PCO	Resigned
Senior Justice Nasir A. Zahid	Refused to take oath under PCO	Resigned
Senior Justice K.R. Khan	Refused to take oath under PCO	Resigned
Senior Justice Wajihuddin Ahmed	Refused to take oath under PCO	Resigned
Senior Justice Kamal Mansur Alam	Refused to take oath under PCO	Resigned
Senior Justice A.R. Khan	Took oath under PCO	Continuation at Supreme Court
Senior Justice Ch. Mohammad Arif	Took oath under PCO	Continuation at Supreme Court
Senior Justice Munir Sheikh	Took oath under PCO	Continuation at Supreme Court

=== Provisional Constitutional Order, 2007 ===
In 2007, another Provisional Constitutional Order (PCO) was issued by General Pervez Musharraf. The PCO was issued on November 3, 2007, and was later amended on November 15, 2007. It was lifted on December 16, 2007.

Provisional Constitutional Order effecting the Judicature of Pakistan
Senior Justices of the Supreme Court of Pakistan	Oath of Office	Extension under PCO
Chief Justice Iftikhar Muhammad Chaudhry	Refused to take oath under PCO	Resigned
Senior Justice Rana Baghwandas	Refused to take oath under PCO	Resigned
Senior Justice Javed Iqbal	Refused to take oath under PCO	Resigned
Senior Justice Abdul Hameed Dogar	Took oath under PCO	Elevated as Chief Justice (2007–09)
Senior Justice Sardar Muhammad Raza Khan	Refused to take oath under PCO	Resigned
Senior Justice Khalil-ur-Rehman Ramday	Refused to take oath under PCO	Resigned
Senior Justice Muhammad Nawaz Abbasi	Took oath under PCO	Continuation at Supreme Court
Senior Justice Faqir Muhammad Khokhar	Took oath under PCO	Continuation at Supreme Court
Senior Justice Falak Sher	Refused to take oath under PCO	Resigned
Senior Justice Mian Shakirullah Jan	Refused to take oath under PCO	Resigned
Senior Justice Muhammad Javed Buttar	Took oath under PCO	Continuation at Supreme Court
Senior Justice Tassaduq Hussain Jillani	Refused to take oath under PCO	Resigned
Senior Justice Saiyed Saeed Ashhad	Took oath under PCO	Continuation at Supreme CourtResigned
Senior Justice Nasirul Mulk	Refused to take oath under PCO	Resigned
Senior Justice Raja Fayyaz Ahmad	Refused to take oath under PCO	Resigned
Senior Justice Chaudhry Ejaz Ahmed	Refused to take oath under PCO	Resigned
Senior Justice Syed Jamshed Ali	Refused to take oath under PCO	Resigned
Senior Justice Ghulam Rabbani	Refused to take oath under PCO	Resigned
Senior Justice Hamid Ali Mirza	Refused to take oath under PCO	Resigned
