= Javed Iqbal (judge, born 1946) =

Former Chairman of the National Accountability Bureau

Judge Javaid Iqbal
- جاوید اقبال

Chairman, National Accountability Bureau
- In office 11 October 2017 – 3 June 2022
- President: Mamnoon Hussain Arif Alvi
- Prime Minister: Shahid Khaqan Abbasi; Nasirul Mulk (Caretaker); Imran Khan; Shehbaz Sharif
- Preceded by: Qamar Zaman Chaudhry
- Succeeded by: Aftab Sultan

Senior Justice of the Supreme Court of Pakistan
- In office 28 April 2000 – 24 July 2011
- Nominated by: Pervez Musharraf
- Appointed by: Rafiq Tarar

Chief Justice of Pakistan (Acting)
- In office 9 March 2007 – 24 March 2007
- Nominated by: Shaukat Aziz
- Appointed by: Pervez Musharraf
- Preceded by: Iftikhar Muhammad Chaudhry
- Succeeded by: Rana Bhagwandas (Acting)

Chief Justice of Balochistan High Court
- In office 2 April 2000 – 28 April 2000
- Nominated by: Amir-ul-Mulk Mengal
- Appointed by: Rafiq Tarar
- Preceded by: Iftikhar Muhammad Chaudhry
- Succeeded by: Raja Fayyaz Ahmed

Personal details
- Born: Javed Iqbal; 1 August 1946 (age 80) Quetta, Baluchistan, British India (Present day, Balochistan in Pakistan)
- Citizenship: Pakistani
- Education: Punjab University (LLB, MA in Poly. Sci); University of Western Australia (LLM in int'l law); International Islamic University (MA in Islamic law and Phil.)
- Occupation: Jurist
- Field(s): Philosophy of law
- Institutions: University of Balochistan

The Supreme Court Building

Javed Iqbal (Urdu: جاوید اقبال) (born 1 August 1946) is a retired chairman of the National Accountability Bureau (NAB) of Pakistan, in office from 11 October 2017 to 3 June 2022. He is also a retired judge of the Supreme Court of Pakistan.

Harassment allegations have been made against him by family members of some accused criminals that he prosecuted during his tenure, but no court action has been taken against him, nor any investigation conducted or evidence produced regarding the allegations.

A jurist and professor of law in Pakistan by profession, he served as the Senior Justice of the Supreme Court of Pakistan from 2004 until his retirement in 2011. Prior to the appointment at the Supreme Court, Justice Iqbal shortly tenured as the Chief Justice of the Balochistan High Court which lasted only a month.

During his career as jurist, he has heard and led high-profile cases, including the case of the suspension of Iftikhar Muhammad Chaudhry, a fellow chief justice, and the trial of missing persons in 2012. His credentials led to the government appointing him as a chairman of the Abbottabad Commission to find out the preludes and causes of the 2 May 2011 military raid that caused the death of Osama Bin Laden, conducted by the United States in Abbottabad, Pakistan. After carefully studying the case, Iqbal authored the Abbottabad Commission Report over this issue which was submitted to the Prime Minister of Pakistan in 2013.

== Biography ==
=== Early life and education ===
Javed Iqbal was born on 1 August 1946 and raised in Quetta. After graduating from the Sandman High School (SHC) in Quetta, he moved to Lahore, Punjab Province to study law.

Admitted at the Punjab University, he obtained an LLB degree in 1968, and an MA degree in political science in 1970 from Punjab University. For his advanced studies, Iqbal went to Australia where he attended the University of Western Australia, subsequently submitting his thesis to obtain an LLM degree in international law in 1971.

=== Professorship and judicature career ===
In 1971, he moved to his native city, Quetta, where he became public prosecutor and government pleader at the Balochistan High Court. In 1973, he joined the law branch of the Government of Balochistan Province which he retained until 1977. Iqbal later acted as the Deputy Secretary at the Law Department in 1981 and later served as the Officiating Secretary Law until 1982. The same year he resigned from the provincial government's legal branch after accepting a professorship in law at the Balochistan University and became an honorary lecturer at Balochistan University.

In 1982, he was appointed a session judge at the district court, and gave verdicts in anti-corruption and custom cases. In 1985, Iqbal attended the International Islamic University (IIU) in Islamabad where he gained a master's degree in Islamic law where his thesis contained the work on jurisprudence in Islamic Faqīh and Sharia laws, in 1987. During the same period, he attended an advanced course National Institute of Public Administration (NIPA) In 1988, he was also appointed the Judicial Member, Income-Tax Appellate Tribunal, but the Government of Balochistan did not relieve him. In 1990, he became Registrar of the Balochistan High Court which he retained until 1993.

== Senior Justice ==
=== Balochistan High Court ===
In 1993, Justice Iqbal was elevated as additional judge at the Balochistan High Court and was confirmed as "justice" by the Governor of Balochistan Province in 1995. In 1999, he was one of the judges in the country who retook their oaths under the Provisional Constitutional Order (PCO), following the aftermath of the military coup d'état staged by Chairman joint chiefs General Pervez Musharraf. On immediate effect, he was appointed the Chief Justice of Balochistan High Court on 4 February 2000 which then was approved by President Rafiq Tarar. This promotion was short-lived as Justice Iqbal was elevated as a "Senior Justice" of the Supreme Court of Pakistan on 28 April 2000.

=== Supreme Court appointments ===
When the Presidential Reference against Chief Justice Iftikhar Muhammad Chaudhry was filed on 9 March 2007, Iqbal served as acting Chief Justice of Pakistan from 9 March 2007 until 23 March 2007.

Iqbal refused to take oath on Provisional Constitutional Order (PCO) on 3 November 2007. As the result he was removed from the Supreme Court along with eleven other judges.

Later he was appointed to the position of chairman of the Press Council of Pakistan (PCP) for three years on 11 November 2007. He announced on 12 April 2008 that he had resigned from that position. On 17 March 2009 as the result of the lawyer and civil society movement for restoration of judiciary, Justice Iqbal was restored to the position of 2 November 2007 on the bench of supreme court.

== Important cases ==
On 13 April 2005, a bench headed by, then Chief Justice Nazim Hussain Siddiqui, with other members of bench being Iftikhar Mohammad Chaudhry, Javed Iqbal, Abdul Hameed Dogar and Faqir Muhammad Khokhar, unanimously dismissed all petitions challenging the 17th Constitutional Amendment and the dual office of General Pervez Musharraf as the President as well as the Chief of Army Staff. However, a decision in a case relating to the retirement age of the superior court judges was withheld.

On 28 September 2007, Javed Iqbal along with Abdul Hameed Dogar, M. Javed Buttar, Mohammad Nawaz Abbasi, Faqir Muhammad Khokhar, and Falak Sher formed a majority opinion in holding that petition challenging General Pervez Musharraf candidature for the second term as the president as non-maintainable. Head of the bench Rana Bhagwandas, with two other members Sardar Muhammad Raza Khan and Mian Shakirullah Jan dissented.

On 3 November 2007, Iqbal was the member of seven-panel bench headed by Iftikhar Muhammad Chaudhry which unanimously declared the 2007 Pakistani state of emergency as illegal and passed an order restraining all judges of Supreme Court and High Courts from taking oath under Provisional Constitutional Order. The other members of the bench were Rana Bhagwandas, Mian Shakirullah Jan, Nasir-ul-Mulk, Raja Muhammad Fayyaz Ahmad, and Ghulam Rabbani.

== Writings and literature ==
- Iqbal, Senior Justice Javed, "The Role of the Judiciary as a Catalyst of Change", Supreme Court of Pakistan Press Registrar. 9 July 2013.
- Iqbal, Senior Justice Javed, et al. "Abbottabad Commission Report"

Legal offices
Preceded by Iftikhar Muhammad Chaudhry	Chief Justice of the Balochistan High Court; 2000	Succeeded by Raja Muhammad Fayyaz Ahmad
Preceded by Iftikhar Muhammad Chaudhry	Chief Justice of Pakistan; Acting; 2007	Succeeded by Rana Bhagwandas; Acting
