= Sardar Muhammad Raza =

Pakistani judge (born 1945)

Sardar Muhammad Raza khan سردار محمد رضا خان

Chief Election Commissioner of Pakistan
- In office 6 December 2014 – 5 December 2019
- Nominated by: Majlis-e-Shoora

Justice of the Supreme Court of Pakistan
- In office 10 January 2002 – 9 February 2010
- Nominated by: Pervez Musharraf

Chief Justice of the Peshawar High Court
- In office 28 April 2000 – 9 January 2002
- Nominated by: Mohammad Rafiq Tarar

Justice of the Peshawar High Court
- In office 14 December 1993 – 27 April 2000
- Nominated by: Mohammad Farooq Leghari

Personal details
- Born: 10 February 1945 (age 81) Abbottabad, Khyber Pakhtunkhwa, Pakistan

Supreme Court of Pakistan

Sardar Muhammad Raza (Urdu: سردار محمد رضا) was the Chief Election Commissioner of Pakistan from 6 December 2014 to 5 December 2019. He previously served as a judge of the Supreme Court of Pakistan and as Chief Justice of the Peshawar High Court.

== Early life, education and training ==
Muhammad Raza was born in the Namli Maira village in Abbottabad district on 10 February 1945. Raza belongs to the Karlal tribe in Abbottabad. After graduating from the Government College of Abbottabad, Khan received a master's degree in economics from Punjab University through the Forman Christian College University in Lahore. He received an LL.B. degree from the same university in 1967.

In 1985, Khan visited the United States to study the American legal system. In 1999, he attended a three-month training course in Tokyo, "Corruption Among Public Officials". In June 2004, Khan visited Ipoh and Kuala Lumpur, Malaysia in connection with an international seminar on "Human Rights and Independence on the Judiciary in the Islamic and Non-Islamic Judicial Systems". In 2006, he visited Dhaka, Bangladesh for a conference on the criminal judicial system.

== Professional career ==
Raza joined Civil Services of Pakistan (Judicial Branch) in 1970 after passing a competitive examination held in 1968–69, and was appointed Senior Civil Judge in 1973. In 1976 he was appointed an Additional District and Sessions Judge, and District and Sessions Judge in 1979. Khan was Judicial Commissioner for Northern Areas for over four years, and was appointed Special Judge Customs Taxation and Anti Smuggling in 1992–93. He was named to the Peshawar High Court on 14 December 1993, and confirmed in June 1995.

On 28 April 2000, Raza took the oath of office as Chief Justice of the Peshawar High Court. He was named to the Supreme Court of Pakistan, and took the oath of office on 10 January 2002. After refusing to take an oath on a Provisional Constitutional Order on 3 November 2007, he and eleven other judges were removed from the Supreme Court. On 19 September 2008, after a democratically elected government came to power, Khan was reinstated to the court with his seniority intact.

== Major cases ==
On 28 September 2007, a nine-member Supreme Court of Pakistan bench, in a split 6–3 verdict, held that a petition challenging Pervez Musharraf's candidacy for a second term as president was invalid. Raza, head of bench Rana Bhagwandas and Mian Shakirullah Jan dissented with the majority opinion. Declaring the petition invalid were Javed Iqbal, Abdul Hameed Dogar, M. Javed Buttar, Mohammad Nawaz Abbasi, Faqir Muhammad Khokhar and Falak Sher.

In another case, in his separate note, he held that all beneficiaries of NRO be dealt with equality and without discrimination; that the monitoring cell constituted within the supreme court is unprecedented, and the court should take action only when violation of its order is complained by any aggrieved party. Sardar Muhammad Raza has also been the top judge at the Federal Shariat Court since June 2014.

Legal offices
Preceded by Mian Mohammad Ajmal	Chief Justice of Peshawar High Court; 28 April 2000 – 9 January 2002	Succeeded by Mian Shakirullah Jan
