= Falak Sher (justice) =

Pakistani judge (born 1943)

Falak Sher فلک شیر

Justice of the Supreme Court of Pakistan
- In office 6 July 2002 – 21 September 2008 (deposed 3 Nov 2007 – 21 Sep 2008)
- Nominated by: Pervez Musharraf

35th Chief Justice Lahore High Court
- In office 14 July 2000 – 6 July 2002
- Nominated by: Mohammad Rafiq Tarar
- Preceded by: Mian Allah Nawaz
- Succeeded by: Iftikhar Hussain Chaudhry

Justice Lahore High Court
- In office 11 March 1987 – 14 July 2000

Personal details
- Born: September 22, 1943 Hafizabad, Pakistan
- Died: 5 November 2020 (aged 77) Lahore, Pakistan

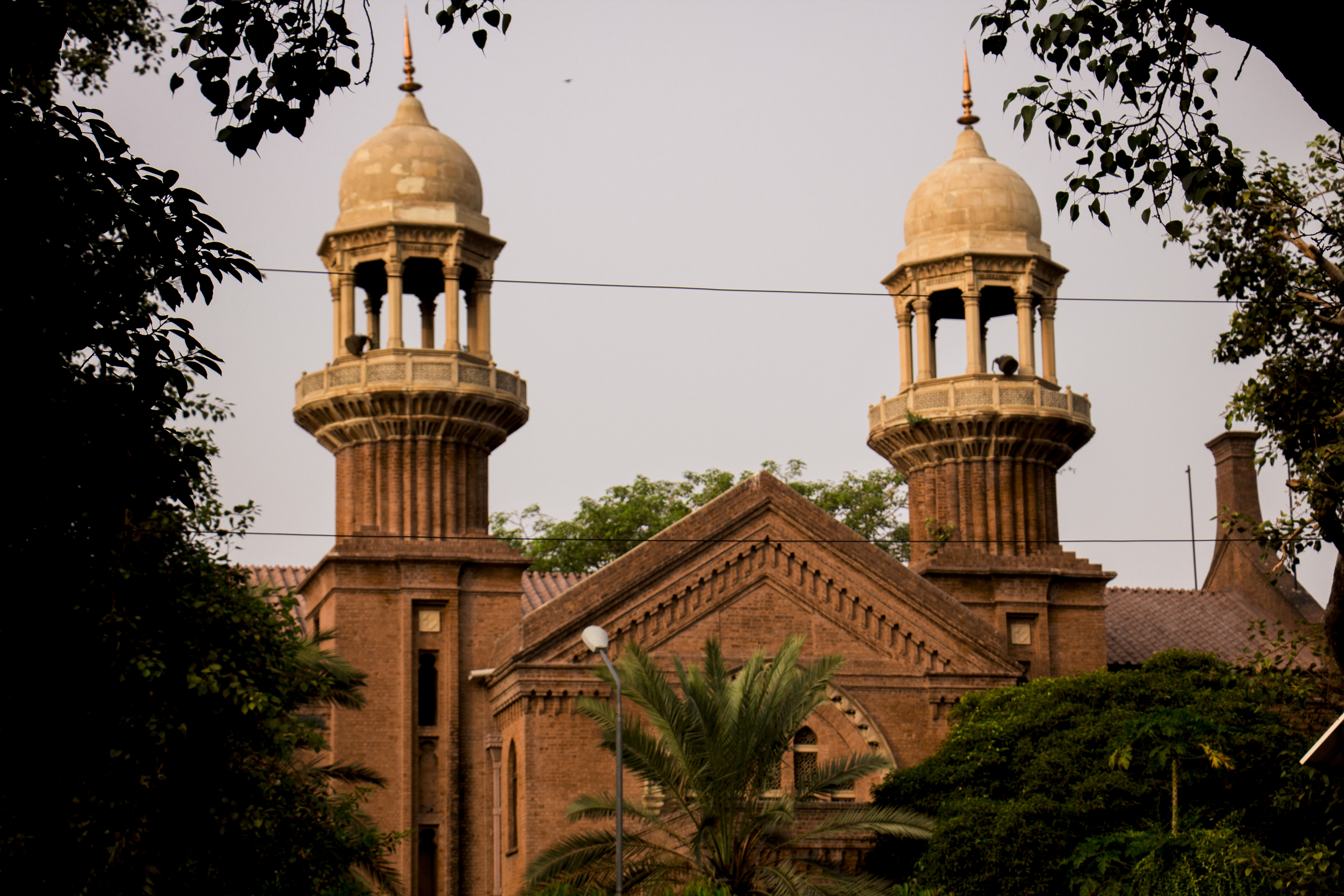
Lahore High Court

Supreme Court of Pakistan

Falak Sher (Urdu: فلک شیر) is a former justice of Supreme Court of Pakistan and a former Chief Justice of Lahore High Court.

== Life ==
Sher was born on 22 September 1943 in Hafizabad (District Gujranwala), Pakistan. He completed his Bachelor of Arts (B.A.) in 1964 from Government College University, Lahore and Bachelor of Laws (LLB) in 1966 from University Law College, Lahore. He was called to the Bar in 1972 at Gray's Inn. He is married and has three children.

== Professional career ==
Mr. Sher joined legal profession as an Advocate of the Courts subordinate to the Lahore High Court in 1966. He was admitted to the rolls of Advocates of the Lahore High Court in 1969 and admitted to the rolls of Advocates for the Supreme Court of Pakistan in 1975.

Upon call to the English Bar was appointed as Legal Advisor to the British Ministry of Health and Social Security in London.

Mr. Sher has been a visiting Lecturer in English Jurisprudence at University Law College for over a decade. He also has been guest speaker in Administrative Law at the National Institute of Public Administration, Lahore as well as at the Pakistan Administrative Staff College, Lahore.

Mr. Falak Sher remained in legal practice from 1966 till 1987, except for the time (1969–1972) that he spent at Gray's Inn.

He was appointed as judge of Lahore High Court on 11 March 1987. He was appointed as Chief Justice of Lahore High Court on 14 July 2000.

From the position of Chief Justice of Lahore High Court, Justice Falak Sher was appointed as Justice of Supreme Court of Pakistan 6 July 2002.

Justice Sher was deposed from the bench on 3 November 2007 as result of Martial Law in Pakistan. He reached age superannuation on 22 September 2008 while still being deposed.

On 12 April 2009 Justice Falak was symbolically restored to his position on 2 November 2007, but since he had reached the age of superannuation he remained retired from the bench.

== Deposition and restoration ==
On 3 November 2007 Chief of Army Staff in Pakistan declared emergency and issued a Provisional Constitutional Order. A seven-member panel of Supreme Court of Pakistan, headed by Chief Justice of Pakistan Iftikhar Mohammad Chaudhry and consisting of Justice Rana Bhagwandas, Justice Javed Iqbal, Justice Mian Shakirullah Jan, Justice Nasir-ul-Mulk, Justice Raja Muhammad Fayyaz Ahmad, and Justice Ghulam Rabbani (Judge Supreme Court)|Ghulam Rabbani, issued an order that declared the declaration of emergency as illegal and prohibited all judges to take oath on any PCO.

Justice Falak Sher acted as per decision of the Supreme Court and refused to take oath on PCO. He was offered to take oath on PCO and become the Chief Justice of Pakistan but he remained steadfast on his resolution not to take oath on PCO. As the consequence of it, on 4 December 2007, he was declared to be no longer a justice of court and declared to be considered as retired with effect from 3 November 2007 without any retirement benefits.

On 12 April 2009 President of Pakistan Asif Ali Zardari restored Justice Falak Sher to his 2 November 2007 position. This restoration was for the purpose that the retired judges may draw their salaries and other benefits during the intervening period as per their entitlement in accordance with the law.

== Controversies ==
=== Oath on Provisional Constitutional Order 1999 ===
Justice Falak Sher as a sitting judge of Lahore High Court took oath on PCO 1999.

=== Seniority issue as Justice ===
The Chief Justice of Pakistan is generally appointed on basis of his seniority. Justice Falak Sher was appointed a judge of Lahore High Court on 11 March 1987 and elevated to Supreme Court on 6 July 2002. After retirement of Chief Justice Nazim Hussain Siddiqui, by virtue of being the longest serving justice on the Supreme Court bench at the time, Justice Iftikhar Muhammad Chaudhry was appointed as next Chief Justice. Justice Iftikhar was appointed a justice of High Court of Balochistan in 1999 and was elevated to Supreme Court on 4 February 2000.

Justice Sher maintained that he was senior to Justice Chaudhry based on their respective elevation to High Courts and should be appointed as Chief Justice of Pakistan. On appointment of Justice Chaudhry as Chief Justice, he petitioned the President of Pakistan on that account for which no decision was made.

During the hearing of the Presidential reference against Justice Iftikhar Muhammad Chaudhry, Justice Falak Sher declined to sit on the full bench hearing the case. He stated that "On account of seniority and being the senior-most judge in the country, it would be improper for me to hear a case in which the chief justice is a party, who like other judges of the Supreme Court is junior to me from four to nine years".

== See also ==
- Lahore High Court
- Supreme Court of Pakistan
