= Iftikhar Chaudhry =

Pakistani judge (born 1948)

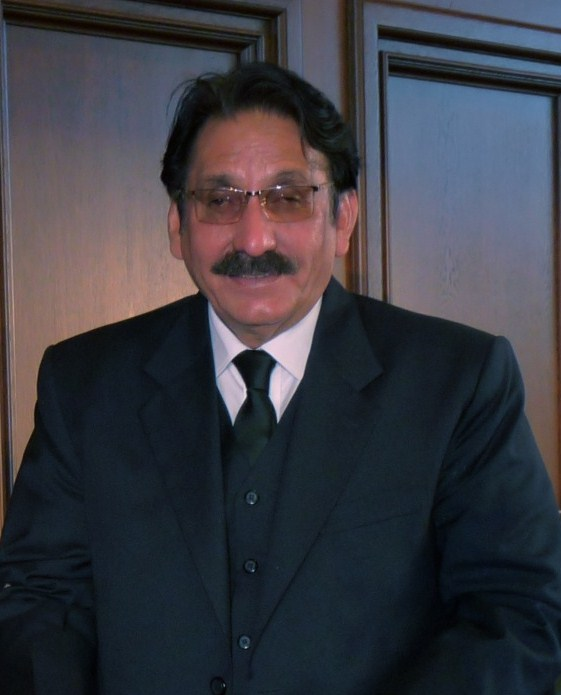

20th Chief Justice of Pakistan
- In office 22 March 2009 – 11 December 2013
- Appointed by: Asif Ali Zardari
- Preceded by: Abdul Hameed Dogar (Acting)
- Succeeded by: Tassaduq Hussain Jillani
- In office 20 July 2007 – 3 November 2007
- Appointed by: Pervez Musharraf
- Preceded by: Rana Bhagwandas (Acting)
- Succeeded by: Abdul Hameed Dogar (Acting)
- In office 30 June 2005 – 9 March 2007
- Appointed by: Pervez Musharraf
- Preceded by: Nazim Hussain Siddiqui
- Succeeded by: Javaid Iqbal (Acting)

Chief Justice of the Balochistan High Court
- In office 22 April 1999 – 3 February 2000
- Appointed by: Miangul Aurangzeb
- Preceded by: Amir-ul-Mulk Mengal
- Succeeded by: Javaid Iqbal

Founder and President of Pakistan Justice and Democratic Party
- In office 25 December 2015 – 20 October 2023
- Preceded by: Position established

Personal details
- Born: 12 December 1948 (age 77) Quetta, Balochistan, Pakistan
- Party: Pakistan Justice and Democratic Party (PJDP)
- Spouse: Faiqa Iftikhar
- Relations: Arsalan Iftikhar Chaudhry (son); Muhammad Aamir Nawaz Rana (nephew); Rana Sanaullah Khan (cousin)
- Children: 5
- Education: Sindh Law University; University of Sindh

Iftikhar Muhammad Chaudhry (Urdu: اِفتِخار مُحَمّد چودهرى; born 12 December 1948) is a Pakistani jurist who served as the 20th Chief Justice of Pakistan over three non-consecutive terms from 29 June 2005 to 11 December 2013.

Chaudhry began practice as an advocate of the Sindh High Court in 1976, before shifting to his native Quetta and later serving as Advocate General of Balochistan, Pakistan. He was elected as president of the Balochistan High Court Bar Association, Quetta in 1986 and was elected twice as member of the Bar Council. He was appointed Advocate General of Balochistan in 1989. He also discharged duties as Banking Judge Special Court for Speedy Trials, Judge Customs Appellate Court as well as Company Judge. He was appointed as Chairman of the Balochistan Local Council Election Authority in 1992 and thereafter for a second term in 1998. He ascended as a senior advocate at Supreme Court before taking a government law assignment in Quetta. In 1990, he was appointed as an additional judge at the Balochistan High Court. He was appointed as Chairman Provincial Review Board for the Province of Balochistan on the recommendations of Hon’ble Chief Justice of Pakistan. He was appointed twice as Chairman of Pakistan Red Crescent Society Balochistan by the Government of Balochistan. In 1999 he was nominated as Chief justice of the Balochistan High Court by the President Rafiq Tarar. The same year, he controversially took oath under Chief of Army Staff General Pervez Musharraf, validating the LFO ordnance No. 2002, and ascended to the Supreme Court in 2002. On 30 June 2005, President Musharraf appointed Chaudhry as Chief Justice of the Supreme Court of Pakistan.

On 9 March 2007, Musharraf asked Chaudhry to resign, which he refused to do, and was suspended from office. The resultant civil disorder led to the Lawyers' Movement, which succeeded in the restoration of Chaudhry as Chief Justice on 20 July 2007. However, Musharraf declared a state of emergency in November, arresting Chaudhry as well as suspending 60 other judges from the judiciary. Following the lifting of the emergency in December and the general elections in 2008, the government was routed, and Musharraf resigned under threat of impeachment. Asif Ali Zardari succeeded Musharraf as president, but also postponed Chaudhry's restoration. This led to the Lawyers' Movement culminating in the Long March by Zardari's political rival Nawaz Sharif, and the restoration of the Chaudhry-led judiciary on 22 March 2009. Chaudhry stepped down on 12 December 2013.

The movement for Chaudhry's restoration garnered world attention, while his term as Chief Justice witnessed unprecedented judicial activism, including the suo motu notice of controversial privatization of the Pakistan Steel Mills, leading the case of missing persons in Balochistan, arguing and issuing orders against the New Murree project regarding an environmental catastrophe, and ruling the National Reconciliation Ordinance (NRO) as unconstitutional. After proceeding the notice of contempt against Prime minister Yousaf Raza Gillani who forcefully refused to direct a letter to Swiss authorities over then President Asif Zardari's hidden assets in Swiss Banks, Chaudhry retroactively discharged and ousted Gillani and his government on 26 April 2012. He retired on 12 December 2013 as Chief Justice.

Chaudhry's legacy is described as having "repurposed a once supine judiciary as a fiercely independent force", but he has also been criticized for judicial overreach and allegations of misuse of office.

On 25 December 2015, Chaudhry announced the formation of the Pakistan Justice Democratic Critic Party headed by himself.

== Early life and family ==
Iftikhar Muhammad Chaudhry was born on 12 December 1948 into Punjabi Rajput family in Quetta, Balochistan Province, Pakistan. His father, Chaudhry Jan Muhammad, was a police constable. Before the independence in 1947 Chaudhry Jan Muhammad was posted from Jalandhar, India to Quetta, Baluchistan. He spent the rest of his life in Quetta, Baluchistan. Chaudhry lived in Quetta before moving to Islamabad, when he was elevated judge of Supreme Court of Pakistan in 2000. Chaudhry has three brothers who are settled abroad and he is the second eldest child of his parents.

Iftikhar Muhammad Chaudhry is married to Faiqa Iftikhar and has five children. His two sons are Arsalan Iftikhar Chaudhry and Ahmed Balach Iftikhar. He has three daughters, Ayesha Iftikhar, Ifrah Iftikhar and Palwasha Iftikhar.

Politician Rana Sanaullah Khan is his cousin.

Chaudry Iftikhar is fluent in Urdu, English, Balochi, Brahui, Punjabi and Pashto.

== Legal career ==
Chaudhry has a Bachelors in Arts and Bachelors in Law (LLB) from the University of Sindh, Jamshoro. He joined the bar in 1974. He was enrolled as an Advocate of the High Court in 1976 and as an Advocate of the Supreme Court in 1985. In 1989 he was appointed Advocate General, Balochistan by Akbar Bugti, the then Chief Minister of Balochistan. He was elevated as Additional Judge, Balochistan High Court on 6 November 1990 until 21 April 1999. On 22 April 1999 he became Chief Justice of the Balochistan High Court. Besides remaining as Judge of the High Court, he discharged duties as Banking Judge, Judge Special Court for Speedy Trials, Judge Customs Appellate Courts and Company Judge. Chaudhry also remained President of High Court Bar Association, Quetta, and was elected twice as a member of the Bar Council. In 1992 he was appointed as Chairman of Balochistan Local Council Election Authority and thereafter for a second term in 1998. He also worked as Chairman of the Provincial Review Board for the province of Balochistan and was twice appointed as Chairman of the Pakistan Red Crescent Society, Balochistan.

On 4 February 2000 he was nominated as a Justice of the Supreme Court of Pakistan. On 30 June 2005 he became the Chief Justice of Pakistan. He is said to be the youngest Chief Justice of Pakistan, who will be serving the longest period that any chief justice has ever served in the history of Pakistan's judiciary. At present, Justice Iftikhar is also functioning as Chairman of the Enrollment Committee of Pakistan Bar Council and as Chairman of the Supreme Court Building Committee.

== Oath taking under PCO 1999 ==
After the proclamation of PCO, on 26 January 2000 an order (Oath of Office (Judges) Order, 2000) was issued that required that judiciary take an oath of office under PCO. Four judges, including Chief Justice Saeeduzzaman Siddiqui, refused to take an oath under the PCO, and therefore no longer remained part of the Supreme Court. To fill the positions in the Supreme Court, Musharraf appointed other judges, including Chaudhry. Musharraf's extra-constitutional acts were legitimized by this new Supreme Court, and the new parliament which was elected under Musharraf legitimized everything including this Supreme Court.

== Suspension and reinstatement, 2007 ==
On 9 March 2007, Chaudhry was suspended by Pakistani President Pervez Musharraf. Chaudhry was summoned to Army House and was asked to resign in the presence of five Army generals, including heads of intelligence services. Chaudhry refused to resign so Musharraf decided to file a presidential reference against Chaudhry for misconduct. Upon Chaudhry's refusal to resign, Musharraf forwarded the case to Supreme Judicial Council (SJC) as per procedure in constitution of Pakistan.

It was the first time in the 60-year history of the Pakistani Supreme Court that a Chief Justice was suspended. The suspension was made on the grounds of complaints against Chief Justice Chaudhry for violating the norms of judicial propriety, corruption, seeking favours and misbehaving with senior lawyers. He was also accused of interfering in the working of the executive branch. On the other hand, Chaudhry too decided in the first time of the history of Pakistan to challenge Musharraf and his reference in the Supreme Court of Pakistan. Musharraf could not swallow this as he had plans to get rid of Chaudhry by sending the reference to SJC. He did not want Chaudhry to remain Chief Justice as he was an independent judge and had blatantly refused to facilitate Musharraf in his plans to get another five-year mandate through the Supreme Court as his predecessors had done. Chaudhry, on sensing that the judges of SJC were doing what was dictated to them by Musharraf, refused to have his case heard in SJC and hence decided to challenge these dubious allegations in the Supreme Court of Pakistan. Chaudhry's petition was taken up by the thirteen member bench of the Supreme Court, headed by Justice Khalil-ur-Rehman Ramday. Chaudhry was represented by five top lawyers of Pakistan, Aitzaz Ahsan, Hamid Khan, Munir A. Malik, Ali Ahmad Kurd and Tariq Mehmood. This panel of lawyers was termed a 'dream team', who fought valiantly for Chaudhry, inside and outside the court.

After his suspension, there was unrest in the country with regard to the validity of the allegations against Chaudhry, as well as doubt as to whether Musharraf technically had the power to suspend the Chief Justice under the circumstances. There was a great outpour of public on roads to greet Chaudhry when he traveled to address bar associations. On 4 May 2007, as he headed towards Lahore from the capital Islamabad, masses of the population lined the 250 km-long-highway to greet him. An otherwise four-hour journey took 24 hours. On 5 May 2007, Chaudhry with his counsel and politician friend Atizaz Ahsan reached the Lahore Bar Association in morning a dinner the association was holding in his honour.

On 20 July 2007, Chaudhry was reinstated to his position as Chief Justice in a ruling by the thirteen-member bench of Pakistan's Supreme Court headed by Justice Khalil-ur-Rehman Ramday. His counsel of five lawyers represented him against 16 senior lawyers representing the Federation. The ruling combined 25 constitutional petitions filed by various parties, but referred most of the issues raised by the 24 petitions not filed by Chaudhry himself to lower courts for extended adjudication. All thirteen of the sitting justices agreed that Musharraf's action had been illegal, and ten of the thirteen ordered Chaudhry was to be reinstated and that he "shall be deemed to be holding the said office and shall always be deemed to have been so holding the same."

== 2007 state of emergency ==
On Saturday, 3 November 2007, General Pervez Musharraf, who was the President and Chief of Army Staff of Pakistan at the time, declared a state of emergency and suspended the nation's constitution and parliament at the same time. He locked all the judges up in order to take revenge on them for giving a judgement in Chaudhry's favour. The declaration accused the judges of violating article 209 of the Constitution of 1973. In addition, Musharraf put not only Chaudhry and all the judges under house arrest but also Chaudhry's young children. Chaudhry's youngest son, Balach, required physiotherapy that too was not provided. His daughter had to take her A Level exam at home, held under the supervision of British Council Pakistan.

On 15 November Geo News reported that Chaudhry had ordered the Islamabad Inspector General of Police to take action against his and his family's house arrest and their possible relocation to Quetta. According to the channel, Chaudhry held the interior secretary, the commissioner, the deputy commissioner and the assistant commissioner responsible for his house arrest. He said he was still the Chief Justice of Pakistan and the official residence was his by right.

== Reinstatement, 2008–09 ==
Just after general elections in February, on 24 March 2008, on his first day of premiership the Pakistani PM Yousaf Raza Gillani ordered Chaudhry's release from house arrest.

In October 2008, Chaudhry visited the Supreme Court building.

The Lawyers' Movement announced a "long march" for the restoration of the judges, especially Chief Justice Iftikhar from 12 to 16 March 2009. The government of Pakistan refused to reinstate the judges and declared section 144 in effect in three of the four provinces of Pakistan thereby forbidding any form of gatherings of the "long march". Arrangements were made to block all roads and other means of transport to prevent the lawyers from reaching the federal capital, Islamabad. Workers of the main political parties in opposition and the lawyers' movement as well as other known persons from the civil society were arrested. Despite these efforts, the movement continued under the leadership of Mian Muhammad Nawaz Sharif and was able to break through the blockade in Lahore en route to Islamabad in the night between 15 and 16 March 2009. A few hours later, on the morning of 16 March 2009, the prime minister of Pakistan restored Iftikhar Muhammad Chaudhry as chief justice of Pakistan through an executive order, after which the opposition agreed to stop the "long march".

== Rulings considered important ==
=== Pre 2007–08 judgements ===
==== Pakistan Steel Mills privatization ====
Chaudhry surprised the whole country when he suspended the privatisation of Pakistan Steel Mills (PSM) on the plea of the PSM workers' union. It did not merely embarrass the government but jeopardised the whole privatisation process. Chaudhry, who was heading the bench, observed that the main objectives of the privatisation policy were poverty alleviation and debt retirement, but these were not given due weightage in the mills' privatisation deal. He objected to the fact that the Cabinet Committee on Privatisation took the Privatisation Board's recommended price of Rs 17.20 per share for granted, and consequently, shares were sold at the low rate of Rs 16.81.

==== Other important cases ====
Some very important cases were heard in the Supreme Court in 2007. Decisions have been taken in some:

- The 'New Murre' housing project was an environmental catastrophe. Despite protests by the civil society and environmental groups, the military government refused to budge since many top politicians and some generals had a stake in this real-estate venture. Chaudhry ordered to shelve this project. He started earning respect for his 'judicial activism'. He took suo motto actions on human rights, women rights cases besides offering relief to trade unions in some cases.
- Another sensitive issue was disappeared activists from Baluchistan province. Hundreds of nationalist activists, including journalists and poets, have disappeared. When the Human Rights Commission of Pakistan moved the Supreme Court against these disappearances, Chaudhry accepted the plea.
- Karachi law and order case
- NICL scam - billions of rupees were recovered; the Chief Justice criticized the Federal Investigation Agency and National Accountability Bureau's performance
- Hajj corruption case
- Power Rental Case - the Supreme Court took action against Raja Pervaiz Ashraf and directed the National Accountability Bureau to recover billions of rupees
- National Reconciliation Ordinance (NRO) was declared unconstitutional by the Supreme Court headed by 17 judges

== Controversies ==
=== Dismissal of petition challenging Legal Framework Order (LFO) 2002 ===
Just prior to the holding of the October 2002 general elections a five-member bench of the Supreme Court of Pakistan, which Chaudhry was a member of, dismissed a petition which challenged the promulgation of the Legal Framework Order (LFO) 2002 by President Musharraf. Under the LFO Musharraf announced amendments to the constitution which restored executive powers to the President, including the right to dismiss the National Assembly and appoint governors and service chiefs, and created a National Security Council (NSC). The main controversy started in 2009 after the restoration of all judges. The oath taking of judges on PCO in the past was then declared a crime by the same judges who had taken oaths on PCO in the past.

=== Judgement on the 17th Amendment and President's Uniform Case 2005 ===
On 13 April 2005, in the "Judgment on 17th Amendment and President's Uniform Case", Chaudhry was one of five Supreme Court judges who dismissed all petitions challenging President Musharraf's constitutional amendments. In a wide-ranging judgement they declared that the Legal Framework Order (LFO) instituted by General Musharraf after his suspension of the constitution, the 17th amendment which gave this constitutional backing, and the two offices bill which allowed Musharraf to retain his military uniform whilst being President were all legal because the Parliament had approved the amendments.

=== Supreme Court justices ===
On 30 July 2009, a 14-member bench of the Supreme Court of Pakistan ruled that all the judges who had taken an oath under the Provisional Constitution Order (PCO), were removed from office and were facing the Supreme Judicial Council. Two days later an ordinance signed by President Asif Ali Zardari officially removed all PCO judges from office.

=== Political affiliation ===
Justice Iftikhar Chaudhry has been criticised by some notable academics, journalists and others for his judicial activism and over-involvement in day-to-day affairs of the government. He is accused of being in alliance with Pakistan Pakistan Muslim League (N), Nawaz Sharif against Pakistan military establishment.

== Awards and honors ==
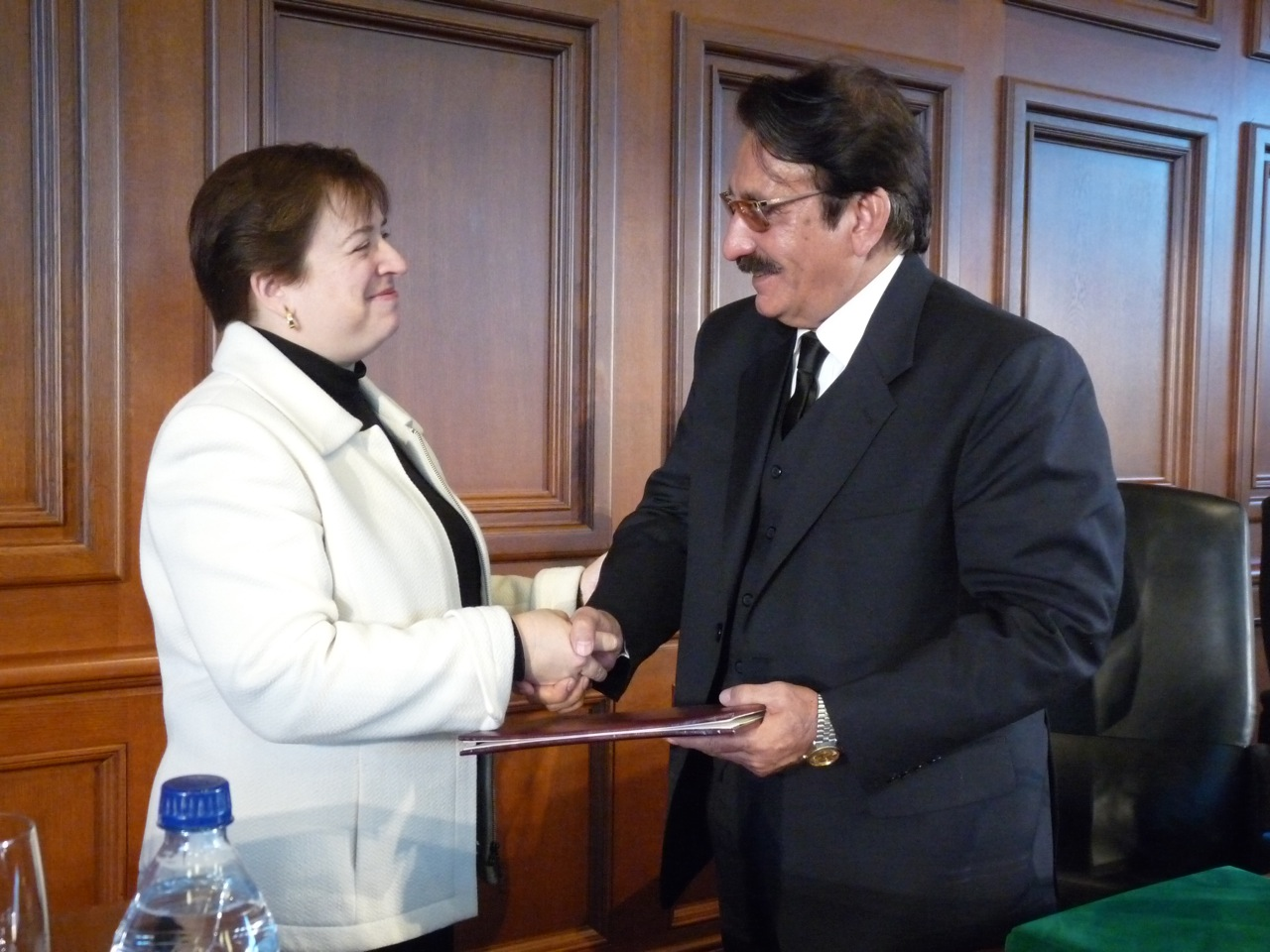
Elena Kagan, the then Dean of Harvard Law School, delivering the Medal of Freedom to Chief Justice Chaudhry

In the wake of the imposition of emergency rule in Pakistan, on 14 November 2007, the Harvard Law School decided to award its highest honour, the Medal of Freedom, to Justice Chaudhry, following the military crackdown the previous week. He was the first Pakistani to be presented with such honour and the third person in the world to receive this award, along with Nelson Mandela and Oliver Hill.

Chief Justice Chaudhry formally received the Harvard Law School Medal of Freedom during his visit to the United States in November 2008. International Jurist Award 2012

The National Law Journal picked Chaudhry as the lawyer of the year for 2007.

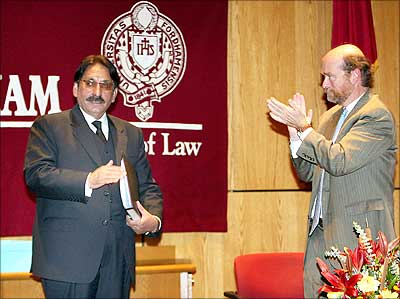
Pakistan CJ in New York

The Association of the Bar of the City of New York granted Chaudhry an honorary membership on 17 November 2008, recognizing him as a "symbol of the movement for judicial and lawyer independence in Pakistan." In 2012 Chaudhry was named among the 100 most influential people in the world by Time magazine.

On 29 May 2012, Chaudhry and Indian Samajwadi Party chief Mulayam Singh Yadav were awarded the prestigious International Jurists Award 2012.

Chaudhry received the award from Lord Phillips, President of the Supreme Court of the UK, for his "unique and tremendous contribution in the field of administration of justice and for the tireless and fearless endeavours towards administration of justice in Pakistan against all odds." He was also named among the World's 100 Most Influential People 2012.

== International visits ==
He attended the 22nd Biennial Congress on the Law of the World, held in Beijing and Shanghai, China in September 2005. He participated in the International Conference and Showcase on Judicial Reforms held in Philippines in November 2005. He also participated in the International Conference and Showcase on Judicial Reforms held in Philippines in November 2005. He visited the United Kingdom in February 2006 in connection with the UK-Pakistan Judicial Protocol on Children Matter.

== Special human rights cell ==
Iftikhar Muhammad Chaudhry worked hard while pursuing his efforts to clear the backlog of cases. He also assumed the additional responsibility of the human rights cases under his suo moto jurisdiction. He established a separate human rights cell at the Supreme Court that received thousands of human rights complaints from poor victims across the country.

== Election reforms ==
The Supreme Court headed by Ifitikhar took many steps to make Election Commission of Pakistan more transparent and valuable, e.g. nomination forms, appointment of Chief Election Commissioner and election expenses.

The Supreme Court observed that the Election Commission of Pakistan (ECP), having the support of 180 million people of the country, was authorised to hold free and fair elections and stop the corrupt people from getting elected in the forthcoming general elections.

== Retirement ==
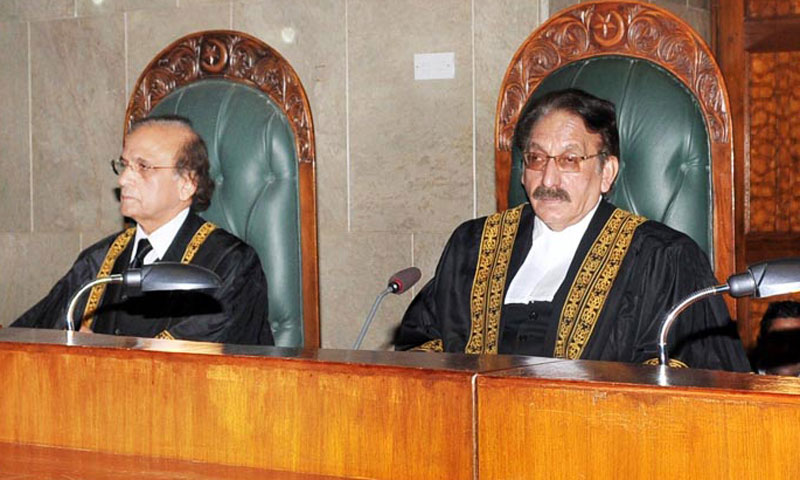
Chaudhry in full court on his last day

Chaudhry retired on 13 December 2013 as Chief Justice. Justice Jilani was to succeed Justice Chaudhry as CJP. In his last speech he focused on human rights and the current Supreme Court position regarding cases. He clarified that now the Supreme Court and law and order are more effective.

== See also ==
- Mediagate (Pakistan)

Legal offices
Preceded by Amir-ul-Mulk Mengal	Chief Justice of the Balochistan High Court; 1999–2000	Succeeded by Javaid Iqbal
Preceded by Nazim Hussain Siddiqui	Chief Justice of Pakistan; 2005–2007	Succeeded by Javaid Iqbal; Acting
Preceded by Rana Bhagwandas; Acting	Chief Justice of Pakistan; 2007	Succeeded by Abdul Hameed Dogar; Acting
Preceded by Abdul Hameed Dogar; Acting	Chief Justice of Pakistan; 2009–2013	Succeeded by Tassaduq Hussain Jillani
