= Raja Muhammad Fayyaz Ahmad =

Pakistani judge

Raja Muhammad Fayyaz Ahmad راجا محمد فیاض احمد

Justice of the Supreme Court of Pakistan
- In office 14 September 2005 – 1 June 2011
- Nominated by: Pervez Musharraf

Chief Justice Balochistan High Court
- In office April 28, 2000 – September 13, 2005
- Nominated by: Mohammad Rafiq Tarar
- Preceded by: Javed Iqbal
- Succeeded by: Amanullah Khan Yasinzai

Justice Balochistan High Court
- In office January 1997 – April 27, 2000

Personal details
- Born: June 1, 1946 (age 80) Pakistan

Raja Muhammad Fayyaz Ahmad (Urdu: راجا محمد فیاض احمد, born 1 June 1946) is a judge in Supreme Court of Pakistan and a former Chief Justice of High Court of Balochistan.

== Early life ==
Ahmad was born in Quetta. He belongs to Gujar Khan district Rawalpindi. He got education from the Government Sandeman High School Quetta and graduated from Government College Quetta. Later he obtained an LL.B. degree from University Law College Lahore.

== Professional career ==
Ahmad enrolled as an advocate in 1968 with the West Pakistan Bar Council and started practicing law at Quetta. He also was an honorary lecturer from 1986 to 1989 in the University Law College Quetta and also for the session 1995. Ahmed was appointed as legal advisor to the Quetta Municipal Corporation from June 1980 to April 1985 and for the second term from July 1987 to February 1990.

Ahmad has been twice elected as joint secretary and general secretary of the Balochistan Bar Association He also has been elected unopposed as president of the Balochistan Bar Association in 1992–1993.

Ahmad was elevated as Judge High Court of Baluchistan in January 1997. He was appointed as Chief Justice of the High Court of Balochistan on 25 April 2000 and took oath of the Office of the Chief Justice on 28 April 2000.

Ahmad was elevated to the Supreme Court of Pakistan on September 14, 2005.
