= Abdul Hameed Dogar =

Pakistani jurist

Abdul Hameed Dogar عبدالحمید ڈوگر

Chief Justice of Pakistan
- In office 3 November 2007 – 21 March 2009
- Appointed by: Pervez Musharraf
- Preceded by: Iftikhar Muhammad Chaudhry
- Succeeded by: Iftikhar Muhammad Chaudhry

Personal details
- Born: 22 March 1944 (age 82) SHAHLDHANI, British Raj (now Pakistan)
- Education: University of the Punjab

Supreme Court of Pakistan

Abdul Hameed Dogar (Urdu: عبدالحمید ڈوگر) is a Pakistani jurist who served as a judge of the Sindh High Court, before being appointed Chief Justice of Pakistan by President Pervez Musharraf, after he dismissed the superior judiciary and declared emergency rule in 2007.

Following the Proclamation of Emergency by General Musharraf as Chief of Army Staff, on 3 November 2007, Justice Dogar took oath under the Provisional Constitutional Order (PCO) and was sworn in as Chief Justice of Pakistan.

After Musharraf's resignation, the judiciary was restored in 2009. On 31 July 2009, the Supreme Court of Pakistan ruled that judges' oath-taking under the PCO was not legal and that Justice Dogar was never a Constitutional Chief Justice of Pakistan, as the office of the Chief Justice of Pakistan was never vacant by the de jure Chief Justice. Hence, the Supreme Court treated him the de facto Chief Justice of Pakistan by protecting his all administrative, financial acts and any oath made before him in the ordinary course of affairs of the office of the Chief Justice of Pakistan, except the recommendations made by him in respect of appointments and reappointments for the offices of the superior judges.

== Life ==
Justice Dogar was born in the village of Gaarhi Mori, in Khairpur District, Sindh province. He passed LLB from Law College, Punjab University, Lahore in 1969. He was enrolled as Advocate in 1970 and practiced law for 25 years before his elevation to judiciary. He also attended Third Lawyers Courses/Lectures in Shariah in 1991 in International Islamic University, Al-Azhar University, Umm al-Qura University, and Islamic University of Madinah.

== Posts held in Bar ==
Dogar held the post of General Secretary of the District Bar Association Khairpur from 1973 to 1974. He became Joint Secretary of the High Court Bar Association, Sukkur Bench from 1984 to 1985. He was consecutively elected President of the District Bar Association Khairpur during 1987–88, 1989–90; 1991–92, 1993–94, and 1994–95.

== Posts held in other fields ==
Dogar became Elected Vice-chairman of the District Council of Khairpur from 1979 to 1983. Simultaneously, he became Member of the Sindh Madressah Board Karachi from 1980 to 1983 and held the post of Honorary Secretary of the District Red Crescent Society Khairpur from 1980 to 1985.

From 1988 to 1990, Dogar became Member of the Board of Governors in the Board of Intermediate & Secondary Education Sukkur. By 1996, he was Syndicate Member in the Shah Abdul Latif University, Khairpur, a position he held until April 2000. He also briefly held the post of Chairman of the Board of Governors IBA from 7 March to 27 April 2000.

In March 2003, Dogar was nominated as Member Board of Governors, National University of Modern Languages, Islamabad. In April 2004, he received nomination as Judge-in-Charge/Chairman of Supreme Court Employees Cooperative Housing Society, Islamabad in April 2004. He was also nominated as Acting Chief Election Commissioner from 10 July 2004 to 3 August 2004, from 30 November 2004 to 6 December 2004 and 15 February 2005 to 16 March 2006.

== Judicial career ==
Dogar joined the judicial service on 10 April 1995 with an appointment to the Sindh High Court. He was elevated to the Supreme Court on 28 April 2000.

Following the Proclamation of Emergency by Chief of Army Staff General Pervez Musharraf, Dogar was appointed as Chief Justice of Pakistan. He took oath on Provisional Constitutional Order (PCO) on 3 November 2007. Earlier a 7-member bench of the Supreme Court had overturned the PCO. Dogar was one of the only four sitting judges in Supreme Court who immediately took oath under the PCO 2007 on 3 November 2007, when the majority of Supreme Court judges refused to take oath under the PCO. The others judges who took the PCO oath with him were Muhammad Nawaz Abbasi, Faqir Muhammad Khokhar and M. Javed Buttar. Later in the evening, in Karachi Saiyed Saeed Ashhad also took oath on PCO on 3 November 2007.

Chief Justice Abdul Hameed Dogar took a new oath on 15 December 2007, this time on the constitution. He retired from Supreme Court on 21 March 2009.

On 31 July 2009, in a landmark verdict, the Supreme Court of Pakistan termed as illegal and unconstitutional the appointment of Abdul Hameed Dogar as Chief Justice.

== Controversies ==
=== Oath on PCO 1999 ===
On 26 January 2000 the higher judiciary was asked to take fresh oath of office under the PCO 1999 by the Chief Executive General Pervez Musharraf. Justice Dogar as the sitting judge of Sindh High Court took oath. On 31 July 2009, the Supreme Court of Pakistan unanimously declared in a judgement that Musharaff's act of 3 November 2007 to impose the emergency as a Chief of Army Staff was unconstitutional and unlawful. Consequently, in the absence of consultations made by the de jure Chief Justice of Pakistan, all the nominations made by the De facto Chief Justice Abdul Hameed Dogar during his tenure were held to be null and void.

=== PCO 2007 Oath and Appointment as Chief Justice of Pakistan ===
On 3 November 2007, the then Chief of the Army Staff Gen. Pervez Musharraf declared emergency in Pakistan and issued a Provisional Constitutional Order (PCO). A seven-bench supreme court bench headed by the Chief Justice Iftikhar Muhammad Chaudhry issued an order that declared emergency illegal and ordered that no judge shall take oath on PCO.

Dogar along with three other judges immediately took the oath under PCO. Dogar was appointed as the Chief Justice of this newly constituted Supreme Court. On 23 November 2007, Dogar and the newly constituted bench consisting of Ijaz-ul-Hassan Khan, Muhammad Qaim Jan Khan, Musa K. Leghari, Ch. Ijaz Yousaf, Muhammad Akhtar Shabbir and Zia Pervez declared that all judges, including the then Chief Justice Iftikhar Muhammad Chaudhry, who did not take oath on PCO, are deemed to have been removed from the bench.

In a later development, on 3 December 2007 federal government issued notification of removal of three justices of Supreme Court without any retirement privileges. They were: Chief Justice Iftikhar Muhammad Chaudhry, Justice Rana Bhagwandas and Justice Khalil-ur-Rehman Ramday.

On 21 March 2009, when Justice Dogar retired from the bench as the Chief Justice of Pakistan, the Chief Justice Iftikhar Muhammad Chaudhry, who was declared to have ceased to hold the office by the bench headed by Chief Justice Abdul Hameed Dogar, was notified as restored to bench as Chief Justice. Since Iftikhar Muhammad Chaudhry after 3 November 2007 was not re-appointed as Justice and also never re-took oath of office, legality of appointment of Mr Dogar as Chief Justice is questionable and Mr Dogar is considered as a de facto Chief Justice rather than de jure.

=== Reassessment of daughter's FSC results ===
In 2008, an investigative report by The News International found out that Justice Dogar's daughter Farah Hameed Dogar examination paper for F.Sc. were reassessed in violation of previous Supreme Court rulings. While the results of 201 candidates were revised, only for Farah were the examination papers remarked and the numbers increased. In the other 200 cases, only errors in adding the total marks were corrected.

Legal offices
Preceded by Iftikhar Muhammad Chaudhry	Chief Justice of Pakistan; Acting; 2007–2009	Succeeded by Iftikhar Muhammad Chaudhry
