= Rana Bhagwandas =

Pakistani judge (1942–2015)

Rana Bhagwandas رانا بھگوان داس راڻا ڀڳوانداس

Chief Justice of Pakistan Acting
- In office 24 March 2007 – 20 July 2007
- Appointed by: Pervez Musharraf
- Preceded by: Javaid Iqbal (Acting)
- Succeeded by: Iftikhar Muhammad Chaudhry

Personal details
- Born: 20 December 1942 Naseerabad, Sind Province, British India (now Pakistan)
- Died: 23 February 2015 (aged 72) Karachi, Pakistan

Rana Bhagwandas (20 December 1942 – 23 February 2015) was a Pakistani jurist who served as a judge and acting Chief Justice of the Supreme Court of Pakistan (CJP). He enjoyed a good reputation as a judge. He remained the acting CJP during the 2007 judicial crisis in Pakistan, and also briefly became the acting Chief Justice of Pakistan when the incumbent Iftikhar Muhammad Chaudhry went on foreign tours in 2005 and 2006, and thus became the first Hindu and the second non-Muslim to serve as chief of the highest court in Pakistan. Bhagwandas also worked as the Chairman of Federal Public Service Commission of Pakistan. He headed the interview panel for the selection of the federal civil servants in 2009.

== Early life ==
Rana Bhagwandas was born on 20 December 1942 into a Sindhi Hindu Rajput family in Naseerabad, in the Larkana District (now Qambar Shahdadkot District) of the Sind Province of British India. He studied law and received a Master's degree in Islamic studies. He joined the bar in 1965 and after two years of practising law with Abdul Ghafoor Bhurgri, an eminent lawyer of Larkana, joined the Pakistani judicial system in 1967. Later, he became a sessions judge, and subsequently, a judge of the Sindh High Court. He was not a fan of cricket, but remained a supporter of the Pakistan cricket team.

== Judicial career ==
Rana Bhagwandas was promoted to the Sindh High Court in 1994. In 1999, his appointment to the superior judiciary was challenged by a constitutional petition (no. 1069/1999) against the Government of Pakistan and Judge Bhagwandas. The petition demanded that the judicial bench consisting of Judge Bhagwandas should be declared unconstitutional because of Bhagwandas' religion, claiming that only Muslims can be appointed to the superior judiciary. The petition was rejected, and the petitioner was condemned by other judges of the high court and by a significant number of lawyers.

In 2000, he joined the Supreme Court of Pakistan after taking an oath of allegiance to Pervez Musharraf's administration under the PCO. Justice Bhagwandas took strong note of a kidnapping case involving a girl in North-West Frontier Province forced to be a prostitute for four years. A believer in the sanctity of the Constitution of Pakistan and its legal system, Bhagwandas maintained that the law was equal for all religious communities in Pakistan. While staunchly defending Pakistan's society and legal system against charges of bias and suppression of minorities, Bhagwandas was also a vocal opponent of the practice of honour killings of women in the provincial rural areas.

For the 2006–2007 judicial year, Justice Bhagwandas was a member of the second bench of justices which was also home to Justice Nasir ul-Mulk and Justice Syed Jamshed Ali.

On 28 September 2007, in a 6–3 vote the court, Judge Rana Bhagwandas presiding, ruled: "These petitions are held to be non-maintainable but he was among the three dissenting judges who thought that Gen. Musharraf should relinquish army chief's post." The judgment removed obstacles to Pervez Musharraf's election bid but gave Bhagwandas more honour and respect in the country.

Justice Bhagwandas refused to take oath under the PCO which was issued by then President of Pakistan General Musharraf and was among the 60 judges sacked on 3 November 2007. He retired in December 2007 and was reinstated in retired status.

== Acting Chief Justice ==
On 9 March 2007, Pakistan President Musharraf declared Chief Justice Chaudhary "non-functional" and forwarded a reference against him to the Supreme Judicial Council (SJC) of Pakistan. While Justice Bhagwandas should have taken his place as Acting Chief Justice, but his whereabouts remained untraceable and it was said that he was on a foreign tour of India. On 15 March 2007 a petition was filed in the Supreme Court urging the Pakistan Government to declare his whereabouts. He returned home on 23 March. He was aware of events transpiring in Pakistan and on his return from India, he assumed the office of the acting CJP from 24 March to 20 July 2007 till the SCP full court restored justice Iftikhar Muhammad Chaudhry.

Earlier, justice Bhagwandas had also served as acting Chief Justice – first in 2005 while Chief justice Iftikhar Chaudhry was on a ten-day trip to the People's Republic of China and then again in December 2006 when the latter was on a Haj pilgrimage. He was the first Hindu and the third non-Muslim (after A. R. Cornelius and Dorab Patel) to serve in this post. On 8 February 2005 Chief Justice Rana Bhagwandas was honoured with "Siropa" (robe of honour) during his maiden visit to Harimandir Sahib in Amritsar, India. He was on a private visit to Amritsar, Ropar and Chandigarh with Justice Khalil-ur-Rehman Ramday, another judge of the Pakistan Supreme Court and his wife.

Chairman FPSC

Rana Bhagwandas worked as the Chairman of Federal Public Service Commission of Pakistan from November 2009 to December 2012. He was also a member of the selection board of the Sindh Madressatul Islam University Karachi.

== Death ==
He died on 23 February 2015 in Karachi, Sindh Province. He was under treatment for a heart ailment at a private hospital at the time of his death.

== Awards ==
In 2023, he was awarded the Nishan-i-Imtiaz by the President of Pakistan for his public services.

== See also ==
- List of Rajputs

Legal offices
Preceded by Javaid Iqbal; Acting	Chief Justice of Pakistan; Acting; 2007	Succeeded by Iftikhar Muhammad Chaudhry
