= Mazahar Ali Akbar Naqvi =

Pakistani judge (born 1960)

Mazahar Ali Akbar Naqvi مظاہر علی اکبر نقوی

Justice of the Supreme Court of Pakistan
- In office 16 March 2020 – 10 January 2024
- Nominated by: Judicial Commission of Pakistan
- Appointed by: Arif Alvi

Justice of the Lahore High Court
- In office 19 February 2010 – 16 March 2020
- Appointed by: Asif Ali Zardari

Personal details
- Born: 1 September 1960 (age 66) Gujranwala, Punjab, Pakistan
- Education: University of the Punjab
- Occupation: Lawyer

Supreme Court of Pakistan, Islamabad.

Sayyed Muhammad Mazahar Ali Akbar Naqvi (Urdu: سید محمد مظاہر علی اکبر نقوی; born 1 September 1960) is a former Justice of the Supreme Court of Pakistan. He assumed office on 16 March 2020 and resigned as a judge on 10 January 2024. Although he was due to retire on 31 August 2025, Naqvi had been facing misconduct proceedings. He had served as a judge of the Lahore High Court before his elevation to the Supreme Court.

In light of facing misconduct proceedings before the Supreme Judicial Council of Pakistan in terms of Article 209(6) of the Constitution of Pakistan, Naqvi had resigned as a Judge on 10 January 2024 and a notification had been issued to this effect. However, the Council had decided to continue misconduct proceedings in light of the Supreme Court of Pakistan's verdict which held that proceedings once initiated against could not abate upon retirement or resignation of a Judge.

The Supreme Judicial Council of Pakistan opinioned on 7 March 2024 that Naqvi had been guilty of misconduct and should have been removed as a Judge .

On 20 March 2024, in light of recommendations for his removal from the Supreme Judicial Council of Pakistan, the President of Pakistan withdrew the notification of his retirement and removed Naqvi from office effective 10 January 2024. Naqvi will no longer be able to use the honorific title of 'Judge' with his name and has lost a right to post-retirement benefits.

== Early life ==
Naqvi was born on 1 September 1960 in Gujranwala city located in Punjab province of Pakistan where he attended the Government Comprehensive High School, Gujranwala.

== Judicial career ==
Naqvi has served as inspection judge of Okara District and Gujrat District. He has been an advocate of the high court since 1988 and then went on to become an advocate of the Supreme Court of Pakistan in 2001. He was appointed as the justice of the Lahore High Court on 19 February 2010. Naqvi is also a member of visiting faculty at Punjab Judicial Academy.

In 2013, his decision to grant bail to an accused after rejecting previous two pleas for the same became the reason for a 2014 judgement by Supreme Court of Pakistan in which it issued detailed guidelines for high court judges and magistrates regarding future bail applications.

In 2016, he was subject to a show-cause notice from Supreme Judicial Council of Pakistan (SJC) due to an alleged misconduct. Naqvi filed a petition challenging the jurisdiction of SJC terming its "rules against the spirit of constitution”. In the same year, his seniority was changed and he was made senior to Muhammad Farrukh Irfan Khan by then chief justice of Lahore High Court Syed Mansoor Ali Shah but that decision was suspended by the Supreme Court of Pakistan.

In 2017, he heard the case to make the model town massacre case report public and directed the Punjab government to do so in result of that hearing.

In November 2017, he was taken off of the Punjab Saaf Paani Company case which was pending in his court. Raising an objection to that, he excused himself from hearing another case which was against the detention of Hafiz Saeed saying "I'm not going to hear this case, How the judiciary could work independently in such circumstances. Interference in judicial work is very awful."

In 2018, he was member of the bench hearing a case against former Prime Minister of Pakistan Nawaz Sharif and his daughter Maryam Nawaz in which both of them were accused of making anti-judiciary speeches. During the hearing of that case, Naqvi had a heated argument with the lawyer of the accused over the latter's objection on inclusion of a judge in the bench who was formerly associated with Pakistan Tehreek-e-Insaf. As a result of that case, the bench ordered Pakistan Electronic Media Regulatory Authority to stop airing the anti-judiciary speeches of Nawaz Sharif and other Pakistan Muslim League (N) leaders. He also headed the bench which sent Waseem Akhtar Shaikh to jail for one month for organizing an anti-judiciary rally. Naqvi headed the contempt of court case against former federal cabinet minister Ahsan Iqbal.

Naqvi also headed the bench hearing the case of Preston Institute of Management Science and Technology's students against non-confirmation of their degrees and issued an order to put university's owner on Exit Control List. He was also part of the full bench which heard the contempt of court case against president of Multan branch of Lahore High Court Bar Association, Sher Zaman Qureshi, ordering his arrest which resulted in a riot by lawyers.

When Fawad Chaudhry was disqualified from contesting 2018 Pakistani general election by an election tribunal, the bench headed by Naqvi suspended that decision and allowed Chaudhry to contest the election. He was also head of the bench which allowed former prime minister Shahid Khaqan Abbasi to contest the 2018 election from NA-57 (Rawalpindi-I) after he was too disqualified by an election tribunal.

During a case against Shahid Khaqan Abbasi, Naqvi issued bailable arrest warrants for Abbasi when he did not appear in the court on 10 September 2018.

On 13 January 2020, the Lahore High Court three member bench headed by Naqvi had annulled the Special Court's verdict ordering a death penalty for treason by military dictator Pervez Musharraf.

The Supreme Court of Pakistan after hearing an appeal against the Lahore High Court's verdict held in early 2024 that the Lahore High Court’s 13 January judgment was in sheer violation of the judgments and orders of the Supreme Court of Pakistan, and that the High Court's flawed order was set aside for being without jurisdiction and unconstitutional.

== Controversies ==
=== Shahzeb Khan murder case ===
He first came to the spotlight during the trial of a high-profile open-and-shut murder case that came before the Supreme Court. Although it was clear that the accused Shahrukh Jatoi had shot Shahzeb Khan In a surprising move, he acquitted the earlier convicted death row prisoner Shahrukh Jatoi of murdering Shahzeb Khan, citing it as an egoistic murder and a failure to meet the burden of proof. This decision sparked controversy and public outcry, with many questioning the motives behind Naqvi's judgment; raising questions about how the influential and powerful could mold the law.

=== Alleged nexus with Faiz Hameed ===
Former Islamabad High Court Justice Shaukat Aziz Siddiqui alleged that General Faiz Hameed, the former spymaster, exerted influence on certain members of the SJC to shield Naqvi from a case. Siddiqui, who was dismissed by the SJC for a speech against the ISI chief, disclosed in a television interview that during the proceedings against Naqvi, then Chief Justice Saqib Nisar presided over the reference, with Asif Saeed Khosa and Gulzar Ahmed also on the bench.

Siddiqui asserted that Hameed contacted Nisar, urging him to acquit 'their man' from the case, to which Nisar agreed and requested Hameed to have Khosa recuse himself from the bench. Siddiqui further claimed that Naqvi's close association with Hameed led to his expedited transfer to the Supreme Court from the Lahore High Court. According to Siddiqui, Naqvi is one of the seven judges elevated to the top court out-of-turn.

=== Audio leak ===
Another significant incident involved the leaking of an audio recording about the Principal Secretary to Chief Minister Muhammad Khan Bhatti, purportedly in collusion with the then Chief Minister of Punjab, Chaudhry Pervaiz Elahi. He is currently being investigated by the Supreme Court of Pakistan, for alleged bribery and malpractices. His assets also came into question.

== Resignation and Misconduct Proceedings ==
For the first time in the Pakistan's History, the Pakistan Bar Council (PBC), the apex regularity body of lawyers, filed a complaint of misconduct against Supreme Court’s Justice Sayyed Mazahar Ali Akbar Naqvi in the Supreme Judicial Council (SJC).

Two judges of the Supreme Court, Justice Qazi Faez Isa and Justice Sardar Tariq Masood, have written to the Supreme Judicial Council (SJC), urging the top judicial body to initiate proceedings on complaints of alleged “misconduct and financial impropriety” against their fellow apex court judge, Justice Sayyed Mazahar Ali Akbar Naqvi.

However, the Supreme Judicial Council meeting was not yet called by Chief Justice Umar Ata Bandial. The prime minister also pointedly asked the chief justice to respond to the allegation of corruption against a fellow judge. “I want to ask the chief justice, that a judge against whom there have been serious allegations, what message do you want to send to the nation by having him sit alongside you?” the premier said.

On 27 October 2023, the new Chief Justice Qazi Faez Isa, called the meeting of the SJC and issued the first show cause notice to Justice Naqvi by a majority of 3-2. J. Naqvi failed to reply to it. On 23 November 2023, by a majority of 4-1, the Supreme Judicial Council of Pakistan issued a second show-cause notice to J. Naqvi, with a direction to come up with his defence by filing a reply within a fortnight. In response, Naqvi challenged the two show-cause notices in the Supreme Court of Pakistan, deeming them politically motivated. He replied to the show-cause notices on 3 January 2024, terming them baseless after the SJC refused to halt proceedings against him.

He resigned from the Supreme Court on 10 January 2024 when Supreme Judicial Council of Pakistan proceedings were being conducted against him, Naqvi claimed that it was no longer possible for him to continue due to circumstances which were 'a matter of public knowledge'.

Subsequent to holding detailed proceedings spanning a couple of months, on 7 March 2024, the Supreme Judicial Council of Pakistan opinioned that Naqvi was guilty of misconduct and should have been removed as a Judge.

The Supreme Court of Pakistan held that a judge who was facing an inquiry on the allegations of misconduct, initiated by the Supreme Judicial Council of Pakistan, resigns such would be considered as an attempt to escape the consequence of inquiry proceedings and bad faith. The purpose of removal of Naqvi was in the larger interest of the people and to protect the public from an unfit judge.

The detailed opinion released on 8 March 2024, concluded that the number of instances of misconduct committed by Naqvi included fraud, which damaged the reputation of the judiciary.
