= Ashraf Jehan =

Pakistani judge (born 1957)

Judge of the Federal Shariat Court
- In office 2013–2014
- Appointed by: Mamnoon Hussain

Personal details
- Born: 9 February 1957 (age 69)
- Spouse: Anwar Zaheer Jamali
- Education: Jinnah Law School, Hyderabad

Ashraf Jehan Jamali (Urdu: اشرف جہاں; born 9 February 1957) is a retired Pakistani judge. After graduating from Jinnah Law College, Hyderabad, Pakistan in 1983 she joined the judicial service as Civil Judge and First Class Magistrate in 1987 and was promoted as District & Sessions Judge Karachi (East) in 2003. In 2012 she was appointed as additional judge of the Sindh High Court, and in 2013/14 she was appointed the first female judge of the Federal Shariat Court. Jehan is married to 24th Chief Justice of Pakistan, Justice Anwar Zaheer Jamali.
