= Kamran Khan (politician) =

Pakistani politician

Kamran Khan Senator

Member of the Senate of Pakistan
- In office 1973–1977

Personal details
- Relatives: Nasir-ul-Mulk (son); Shuja-ul-Mulk (son)

Kamran Khan was a Pakistani politician and businessman who served as a member of Senate of Pakistan between 1973 and 1977.

He was the father of Chief Justice of Pakistan Nasir-ul-Mulk.
