= Tassaduq Hussain Jillani =

Pakistani judge (born 1949)

- تصدق حسین جیلانی

21st Chief Justice of Pakistan
- In office 11 December 2013 – 5 July 2014
- Nominated by: Nawaz Sharif
- Appointed by: Mamnoon Hussain
- Preceded by: Iftikhar Muhammad Chaudhry
- Succeeded by: Nasir-ul-Mulk

Acting Chief Election Commissioner of Pakistan
- In office 17 August 2013 – 30 November 2013
- Preceded by: Fakhruddin G. Ebrahim
- Succeeded by: Nasir-ul-Mulk

Justice of the Supreme Court of Pakistan
- In office 31 July 2004 – 11 December 2013

Justice of the Lahore High Court
- In office 7 August 1994 – 31 July 2004
- Nominated by: Benazir Bhutto
- Appointed by: Chaudhry Altaf Hussain

21st Advocate General Punjab
- In office 26 July 1993 – 18 November 1993
- Governor: Iqbal Khan
- Preceded by: Khalil-ur-Rehman Ramday
- Succeeded by: Mian Abdul Sattar Najam

Personal details
- Born: 6 July 1949 (age 77) Multan, Punjab, Pakistan
- Relations: Jalil Abbas Jilani (brother)
- Education: Forman Christian College; University of the Punjab

Supreme Court of Pakistan

Tassaduq Hussain Jillani (born 6 July 1949) is a retired Pakistani judge who served as the 21st Chief Justice of Pakistan from 2013 to 2014. He previously served as a justice of the Supreme Court of Pakistan from 2004, after being nominated as a justice of the Lahore High Court by Prime Minister Benazir Bhutto in 1994.

Born in Multan, Jillani was educated at Forman Christian College and University of the Punjab. He served as Advocate General Punjab in 1993 before his elevation as judge. While seated on the Supreme Court, Jillani refused to take oath under General Pervez Musharraf during emergency rule in 2007, and his post was rendered nonfunctional. After the Lawyers' Movement, he was restored to the bench in 2009.

Considered a progressive judge, Jillani was a strong proponent of civil liberties and fundamental rights, authoring landmark decisions on women's rights, honour killings, and the right to education. He also authored the suo moto decision on the protection of minorities and freedom of religion after the Peshawar church attack in 2013, widely held as the broadest interpretation of religious freedom laws in Pakistan's history.

His name was proposed for caretaker prime minister by opposition party Pakistan Tehreek-e-Insaf in 2018.

== Early life and education ==
Tassaduq Hussain Jillani was born in Multan, Pakistan. After graduating from high school, Jillani attended Government Emerson College Multan and Forman Christian College University, where he earned BA and MS degrees in political science. He then gained a Bachelor of Laws from the Punjab University. On a Higher Education Commission scholarship, Jillani later completed a course in constitutional Law from the Institute of Advanced Legal Studies of the London University. Jillani was honoured with a "Doctorate in Humane letters" from Southern Virginia University in a special convocation on 12 October 2007.

== Legal career ==
After completing his studies, Jillani started his law practice in 1974, in the district courts of Multan. After enrolling as an advocate at the Lahore High Court, he was elected General Secretary of the Lahore High Court Bar Association in 1976, and became a member of the Punjab Bar Council in 1978.

He was appointed Assistant Advocate-General of Punjab in July 1979 and enrolled as an advocate of the Supreme Court in 1983. In 1988, he was promoted to Additional Advocate-General of Punjab, before becoming Advocate-General of the province in 1993.

== Judicial career ==
On 7 August 1994, Jillani was elevated as a judge of the Lahore High Court after his nomination was approved by Prime Minister Benazir Bhutto. He was elevated to the Supreme Court of Pakistan in 2004 by Prime Minister Shaukat Aziz.

=== Emergency rule suspension and reinstatement ===
On 7 November 2007, Jillani was one of the senior justices who refused to take a fresh oath of office, following the imposition of emergency rule by military ruler Pervez Musharraf. The justices regarded the Provisional Constitutional Order law by which to take oath, instituted by Musharraf, as unconstitutional. Jillani was among the senior justices that were forcefully retired and detained directly from the Supreme Court.

This exacerbated the Lawyers' Movement against the Musharraf regime, and led to the reinstatement of the suspended judiciary on 23 March 2009. Prime Minister Gilani announced that President Asif Zardari had issued an executive order that restored the pre-Emergency judiciary, including the Chief Justice Iftikhar Chaudhry. All deposed justices accepted reappointment.

On 31 July 2009, a full 14-member bench including Jillani held the declaration of emergency and imposition of PCO illegal and invalid. It also held that the removal of all justices from the higher judiciary was not valid, and that the reappointment of justices had no legal effect as their removal in the first place was not valid.

== Acting Chief Election Commissioner ==
On 17 August 2013, Chief Justice Iftikhar Muhammad Chaudhry appointed Jillani to act as Chief Election Commissioner with immediate effect till the appointment of a new Commissioner. He succeeded former Justice Fakhruddin Ebrahim, who resigned from the office on 30 July 2013. His appointment as chief election commissioner was secured through the by-election clauses of the Constitution.

== Chief Justice of Pakistan ==
After appointing the Chairman Joint Chiefs of Staff Committee, Prime Minister Nawaz Sharif approved the nomination papers of Senior Justice Jillani to be elevated as Chief Justice, upon the constitutional retirement of the Chief Justice Iftikhar Chaudhry which due for 12 December 2013. Per Prime Minister Sharif's nomination, President Mamnoon Hussain approved the appointment the same day.

Upon approval of his nomination, Senior Justice Jillani immediately resigned as Chief Election Commissioner and passed the office to fellow Senior Justice Nasir-ul-Mulk. On 12 December 2013, President Mamnoon Hussain, alongside chaired with Prime Minister Sharif, administered the oath to JSenior Justice Jillani as the Chief Justice.

Immediately after his oath, Justice Jillani declined special security protocol, and directed Interior Minister Chaudhry Nisar not to impose restrictions on commuters during his passage.

He also took suo motu action against the court administration for allowing only one news channel to exclusively cover the full-court reference in honour of the outgoing Justice Chaudhry. Justice Chaudhry's principal secretary was found to be involved, and was transferred to the human rights cell as a result.

=== Suo Moto Case 1 of 2014 ===
The Jillani Court took suo moto action following a petition filed by Justice Helpline regarding the Peshawar church attack in 2013, as well as other petitions filed by the Hindu community against desecration of their places of worship and press reports citing threats to the Kalash tribe by the Pakistani Taliban. On 19 June 2014, the Supreme Court issued a landmark decision on the protection of minorities and freedom of religion, authored by Justice Jillani in a bench also comprising Justices Azmat Saeed and Mushir Alam. The decision's expansion of freedom of religious expression in Pakistan has been compared to Brown v. Board of Education outlawing segregation in the United States.

=== World Justice Project ===
Tassaduq Hussain Jillani serves as an Honorary Co-chair for the World Justice Project. The World Justice Project works to lead a global, multidisciplinary effort to strengthen the Rule of Law for the development of communities of opportunity and equity.

In July 2008, when Senior Justice Jillani was invited by the American Bar Association to receive and accept the Rule of Law Award on behalf of those judges of Pakistan who demonstrated courage in upholding the Rule of Law in the country, he penned:

In Pakistan, if one were to distinguish a headline from a trend line in assessing change, the recent events are a pointer to a moral renaissance and augur well for the spiritual health of the nation. Never before has so much been sacrificed by so many for the supremacy of law and justice. The assertion of the judicial conscience, the rise of a vibrant Bar, a vigilant civil society, and the emergence of an independent media would ultimately lead to the establishment of a constitutional democracy, stable political institutions, and an expanded enforcement of the Rule of Law. These to me are the trend lines that I would like to pin my hopes on...

— Senior Justice Tassaduq Hussain Jillani, 2008, source

== Judicial philosophy ==
Jillani was considered a liberal and progressive judge, and at times described as the most moderate member of the Supreme Court. He was a proponent of the "living constitution", but often emphasized a "trichotomy of powers" and judicial restraint in the aftermath of the Chaudhry Court. While hearing a case related to banking redundancies, Jillani's jurisprudence notably read as it was "for the bank management to decide about the usefulness of the employees"— an unusual ruling in a court known for its populist judgments.

== Personal life ==
Jillani is the son of Muhammad Ramzan Shah Jillani. He is married to Khalida Jillani, and they have three sons and a daughter. Jillani is the uncle of former Foreign Secretary Jalil Jilani, and a distant relation to former Prime Minister Yusuf Raza Gilani.

=== Library and literary enthusiasm ===
Justice Jillani is described as an avid enthusiast of poetry, antiques and classical films. When a biographical documentary on him was aired on news channels, a retired librarian of the Supreme Court building, Muhammad Aslam, quoted that "Justice Jillani managed the affairs of the library and made sure to add thousands of new judicial and non-judicial books to its shelves."

He also authored and penned a theme song, Justice for All!, sung by various Pakistan's singers at the 50th Anniversary of the Supreme Court of Pakistan. The song has been declared as the Judicial Anthem of Pakistan by former Chief Justice Iftikhar Chaudhry.

== Works ==
- Jillani, Tassaduq H. "Defending the Constitution under the Rule of Law", American Bar Association Press, 2009.
- Jillani, Tassaduq H. The Rule of Law in an Age of Globalized Interdependence, American Bar Association
- Jillani, Tassaduq H. "Women in Law" International Bar Association Annual Conference, Dubai, 2011
- Jillani, Tassaduq H. Towards a dynamic constitutional order, Supreme Court of Pakistan Press (1971), ASIN: B0014N4DQY

== See also ==
- Haziqul Khairi
- Saqib Nisar
- Nasir-ul-Mulk
- Supreme Court of Pakistan

Legal offices
Preceded by Iftikhar Muhammad Chaudhry	21st Chief Justice of Pakistan; 2013–2014	Succeeded by Nasir-ul-Mulk
Preceded by Khalil-ur-Rehman Ramday	21st Advocate General Punjab; 1993	Succeeded by Mian Abdul Sattar Najam
