= Jalil Abbas Jilani =

Pakistani diplomat

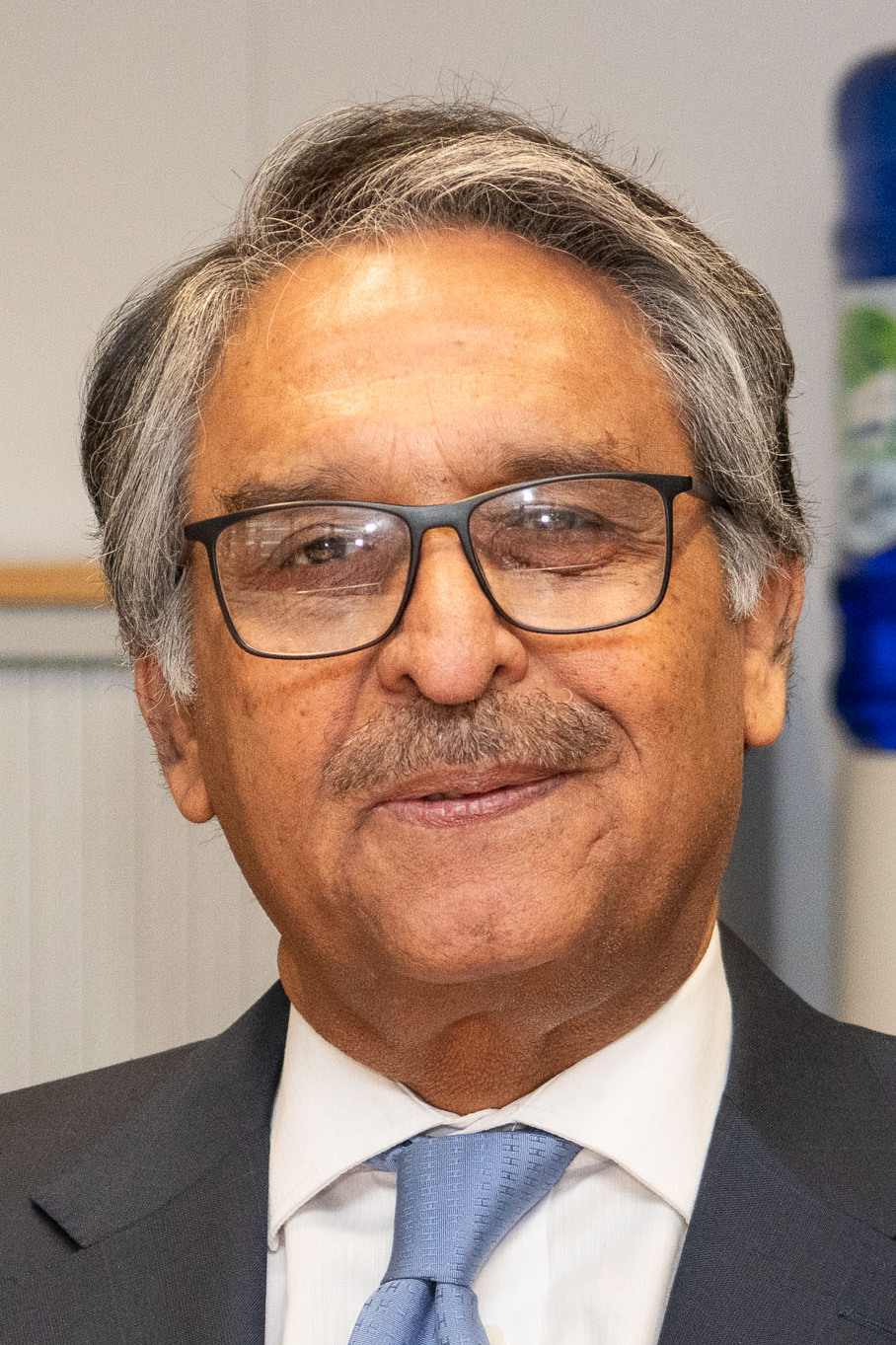
- Jilani in 2023

Minister for Foreign Affairs
- Caretaker
- In office 17 August 2023 – 4 March 2024
- President: Arif Alvi
- Prime Minister: Anwaar ul Haq Kakar
- Preceded by: Bilawal Bhutto Zardari
- Succeeded by: Ishaq Dar

27th Foreign Secretary of Pakistan
- In office 2 December 2013 – 26 February 2017
- Nominated by: Mamnoon Hussain
- Preceded by: Sherry Rehman
- Succeeded by: Aizaz Ahmad Chaudhry

Ambassador of Pakistan to the United States
- In office 16 March 2012 – 2 December 2013
- Prime Minister: Yousaf Raza Gillani; Raja Pervaiz Ashraf; Nawaz Sharif
- Preceded by: Salman Bashir
- Succeeded by: Aizaz Ahmad Chaudhry

Personal details
- Born: 2 February Multan, Punjab, Pakistan
- Relations: Tassaduq Hussain Jillani (uncle); Yusuf Raza Gillani (cousin)
- Education: Punjab University Law College (LLB)

Jalil Abbas Jilani is a retired Pakistani diplomat who served in Grade 22 as the Foreign Secretary of Pakistan. He is former Caretaker Minister of Foreign Affairs, he served in office from 17 August 2023 till 4 March 2024. He was born on February 3, 1955, in Multan to a family known for high-profile bureaucrats. He served as the 22nd Ambassador of Pakistan to the United States from December 2013 to February 2017, and previously served as the Foreign Secretary of Pakistan from March 2012 to December 2013. He has also served as a senior director at the Centre for Aerospace and Security Studies (CASS).

== Early life and education ==
Jilani was born into an influential family in Multan, his father Azhar Hussain Jilani and his elder brother Asghar Hussain Jilani both having been civil servants, the latter having served as Chief Secretary of the Punjab province, while former prime minister Yusuf Raza Gilani is his cousin. His uncle Tassadaq Jilani is the former Chief Justice of Pakistan, occupying the position in 2013–2014.

He graduated with a Bachelor of Law from Punjab University Law College and later on obtained an M.Sc degree in Defense and Strategic Studies. He then joined the Foreign Service of Pakistan in March 1979.

A polyglot, besides Urdu and English, he is also fluent in French, Arabic, Seraiki, Punjabi and Pashto.

== Career ==
Jillani currently serves as a Minister in Interim PM Kakar's Cabinet.

He served as the deputy secretary at Prime Minister's Office between 1989 and 1992, and as the deputy high commissioner to India between 1999 and 2003. He headed the South Asia desk at the Foreign Office between 2003 and 2007, during which time he was also appointed the Ministry's Spokesman.

In 2007, he was commissioned as Pakistan's High Commissioner to Australia and served until 2009, when he was tasked as Ambassador of Pakistan to European Union based out of Brussels. Jilani was promoted to the highest rank of BPS-22 grade in 2010 and consequently became the country's Foreign Secretary in March 2012, the top civil service official in the Ministry of Foreign Affairs.

Jilani emerged as a candidate for the role of Interim Prime Minister of Pakistan.

Diplomatic posts
Preceded by Sherry Rehman	Pakistan Ambassador to the United States; 2013–2017	Succeeded by Aizaz Ahmad Chaudhry
