= Anwar Zaheer Jamali =

Pakistani judge (born 1951)

Anwar Zaheer Jamali انور ظہیر جمالی
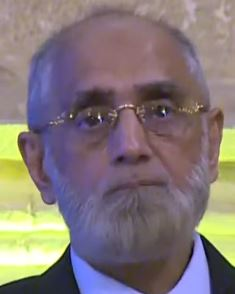

24th Chief Justice of Pakistan
- In office 10 September 2015 – 30 December 2016
- Appointed by: Mamnoon Hussain
- Preceded by: Jawwad S. Khawaja
- Succeeded by: Mian Saqib Nisar

Chief Election Commissioner of Pakistan (acting)
- In office 3 July 2014 – 4 December 2014
- Nominated by: Mamnoon Hussain
- Preceded by: Nasir-ul-Mulk
- Succeeded by: Sardar Muhammad Raza Khan

Chief Justice of the Sindh High Court (De facto)
- In office 27 August 2008 – 2 August 2009
- Nominated by: Pervez Musharraf
- Preceded by: Justice Azizullah M. Memon
- Succeeded by: Justice Sarmad Jalal Osmany

Chairman Executive of the Sindh Bar Council
- In office 1995–1998

Personal details
- Born: 31 December 1951 (age 74) Hyderabad, Sind, Pakistan
- Spouse: Justice Ashraf Jehan

Anwar Zaheer Jamali (Urdu: انور ظہير جمالى; born 31 December 1951) is a Pakistani jurist who served as the 24th Chief Justice of Pakistan. He remained in the Supreme Court from 3 August 2009 to 30 December 2016. He has also served as the Acting Chief Election Commissioner of Pakistan, and Chief Justice of the Sindh High Court. In 1995, he was elected as Chairman Executive Committee (CEC) of the Sindh Bar Council and held this position till his elevation to the Bench. He was highly praised for being one of the few judges who refused to take a fresh oath under the Provisional Constitutional Order No.1 of 2007. As the chief justice, he took several suo motos, notably in several human rights cases.

== Early life and education ==
Jamali hails from the noble, religious family of Qutub Jamal-ud-Din Hansvi, the disciple of Baba Fariduddin Ganjshakar and is a direct descendant of Imam Abu Hanifa.

His parents migrated from Jaipur, India in 1947. He was born in Hyderabad (Sindh) on 30 December 1951. He received his bachelor's degree in Commerce from the University of Sindh in 1971 and a bachelor's degree in law in 1973 from the same university.

== Professional career ==
He was enrolled at the Sindh Bar Council as an Advocate of the Lower Court on 10.01.1975 and as an Advocate of the Sindh High Court on 13.11.1977. He was enrolled as an Advocate of the Supreme Court on 14.05.1987. He also served as lecturer at Hyderabad (Sindh) Law College for about two years.

=== Judicial ===
Jamali was elevated as judge of the Sindh High Court in May 1998. He was nominated as Administrative Judge for the Sindh High Court on 7 June 2006 and continued as such till 3 November 2007 when he refused to take fresh oath under the Provisional Constitutional Order No.1 of 2007. He was reappointed as Judge and Chief Justice of the Sindh High Court on 27 August 2008. He was elevated as judge of the Supreme Court of Pakistan on 3 August 2009 and appointed as Acting Chief Election Commissioner of the Election Commission of Pakistan on 3 July 2014. He was appointed as 24th Chief Justice of Pakistan on 10 September 2015 by President Mamnoon Hussain.

== Other positions ==
- President District Bar Association Hyderabad in the years 1983-84, 1995–96, 1996–97 and 1997-98.
- Elected Member, Sindh Bar Council from Hyderabad Division for two terms of five years each in the years 1989 and 1990.
- Elected Chairman Benevolent Fund Committee of Sindh Bar Council in the year 1991.
- Elected Chairman Executive Committee of Sindh Bar Council in the year 1995.
- Member Board of Governors for the Government Law College in Sindh (excluding Karachi).
- Member Syndicate NED University of Engineering and Technology, Karachi in November 1999.
- Chairman Enrollment Committee, Sindh Bar Council in March 2000.
- Chairman Provincial Zakat Council Sindh for a term of three years, December 2003.

== See also ==
- Sindh High Court
- Supreme Court of Pakistan
