= Irshad Hasan Khan =

Pakistani judge (born 1937)

Irshad Hasan Khan ارشاد حسن خان
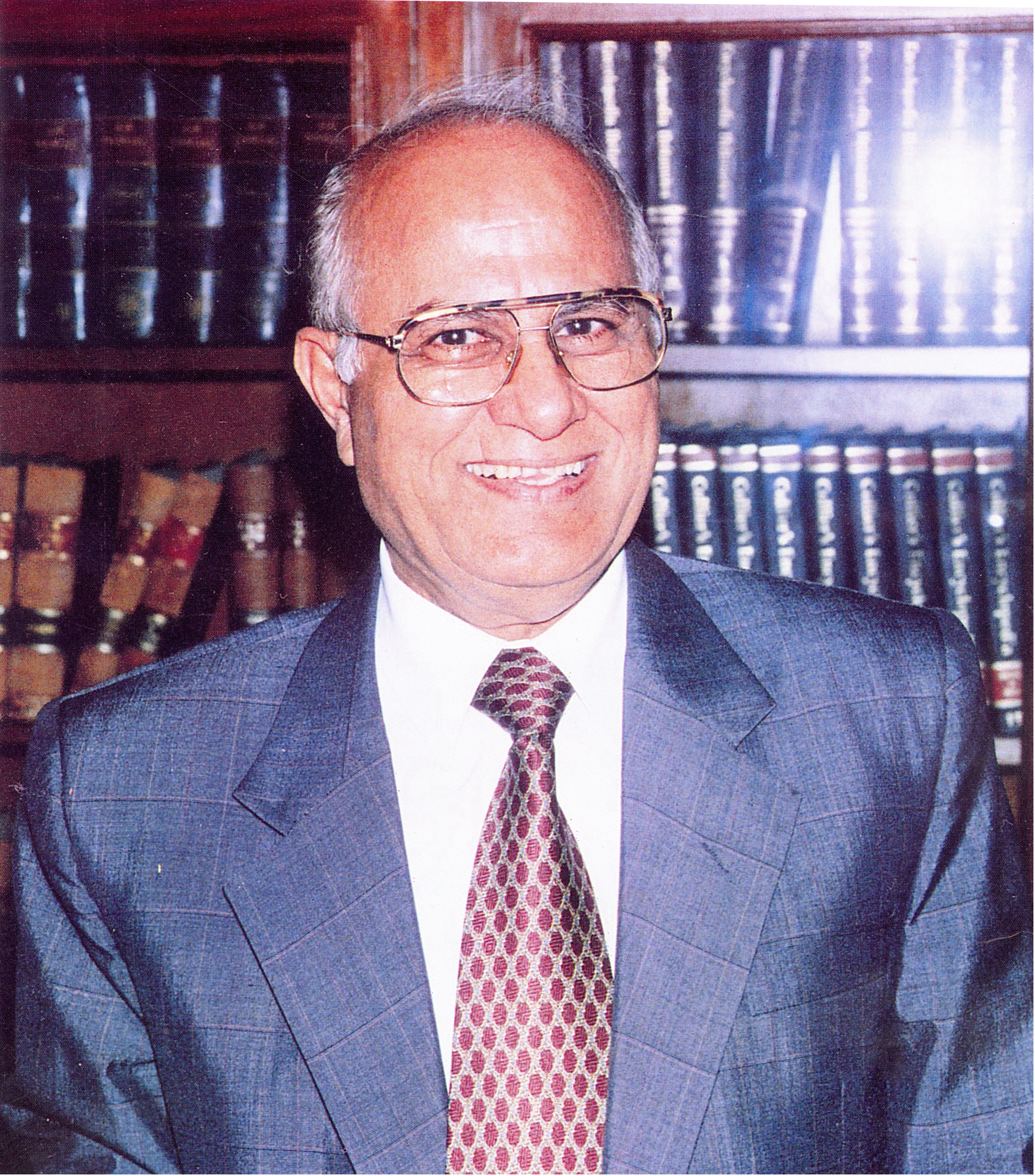

16th Chief Justice of Pakistan
- In office 26 January 2000 – 6 January 2002
- Preceded by: Saeeduzzaman Siddiqui
- Succeeded by: Bashir Jehangiri

Judge of the Supreme Court of Pakistan
- In office October 1994 – 25 January 2000

Acting Chief Justice of the Lahore High Court
- In office June 1995 – April 1996

Law Secretary of Pakistan
- In office 1984–1988

Judge of the Lahore High Court
- In office 1981–1995

Deputy Attorney General for Pakistan
- In office 1979–1981

Personal details
- Born: Irshad Hasan Khan; 7 January 1937 (age 89) Simla, British India (now India)
- Citizenship: Pakistani
- Education: Government College University; Punjab University

Justice Irshad Hasan Khan (Urdu: ارشاد حسن خان) (born 7 January 1937) is a Pakistani jurist who served as Chief Justice of Pakistan from January 2000 to January 2002. As the chief justice, he validated the 1999 military coup against a democratically elected government by invoking the doctrine of necessity.

== Early life ==
Irshad Hasan Khan graduated in law from University Law College, Lahore. He started his legal career as a pleader in 1959 and became an advocate of the High Court of West Pakistan in 1961. Later, he was enrolled as an advocate of Supreme Court of Pakistan in 1966 and eventually became a Senior Advocate of Supreme Court in 1979. From 1975 to 1979, he was a visiting professor at Himayat-e-Islam Law College, Lahore.

== Career ==
Irshad Hasan Khan's career in the legal and judicial field is marked by several significant appointments and achievements:

• Deputy Attorney General for Pakistan from 1979 to 1981;

• Elevated as a Judge in the Lahore High Court in 1981;

• Secretary, Ministry of Law, Justice and Parliamentary Affairs, Government of Pakistan from 1984 to 1988;

• Ad hoc Judge of the Supreme Court in October 1994;

• Became a Judge of the Supreme Court in May 1995;

• Acting Chief Justice of the Lahore High Court from June 1995 to April 1996; and

• Chief Justice of Pakistan on 26 January 2000.

During his tenure as Chief Justice of Pakistan, he held various important positions:

• Ex officio Chairman, Supreme Judicial Council;

• Chairman, Supreme Chief Justices’ Committee;

• Chairman, Pakistan Law Commission (a federal statutory institution responsible for systematic legal reform);

• Chairman, Federal Judicial Academy (an institution for training judicial officers and court staff);

• Chairman, Al-Mizan Foundation (a body for the welfare of retired Judges of Superior Courts, retired/serving Judges of subordinate courts, and court staff); and

• Chairman, Judicial Policy Body (responsible for strengthening institutional capacity for judicial and legal reforms). Mr Irshad Hasan Khan also had international engagements and affiliations:

• Ex officio Patron of the Commonwealth Judicial Education Institute, Halifax, Nova Scotia, Canada;

• Advisor to the Worldwide Judges Center, Annandale, Virginia, USA in the year 2001;

• Member of the Panel of Arbitrators, International Center for Settlement of Investment Disputes, Washington D.C., U.S.A.;

• Participated in various international conferences and seminars related to law and justice.

== Doctrine of necessity ==
In May 2000, as a Chief Justice of Pakistan, He validated 1999 Pakistani coup d'état by invoking the doctrine of necessity.

== Chief Election Commissioner ==
Justice Irshad Hasan Khan was appointed Chief Election Commissioner of Pakistan on 14 January 2002. He served in this position until his retirement on 13 January 2005.

== Acting President ==
While holding the position of Chief Justice of Pakistan, Khan served as Acting President of Pakistan in November 2001, when President Pervez Musharraf was abroad.

== Autobiography ==
Irshad Nama is the autobiography of Justice Irshad Hasan Khan, the 14th Chief Justice of Pakistan. It was published in 2020 and is a fascinating account of his life and career, from his humble beginning as an orphan to his rise to the highest judicial office in the country.

The book is written in a clear and engaging style. Justice Khan discusses the challenges and controversies he encountered during his career. He also provides his perspective on several significant legal and political events in Pakistan’s recent history.

== Academic affiliations ==
Mr Irshad Hasan Khan also performed several educational and institutional roles:

• In 2001, Justice Khan was conferred an Honorary professorship at the National Judges College of China, an educational institution located in Beijing under the jurisdiction of the Supreme People's Court. This college plays a pivotal role in the training of judges for the People's Republic of China.

• Member of the Committee appointed by the Supreme Court of Pakistan on Independence of Judiciary and Separation of the Judiciary from the Executive.

• Member of Sharia’h Academy, International Islamic University, Islamabad.

• Member of Syndicate, Bahauddin Zakariya University, Multan, and Syndicate, University of Engineering and Technology, Lahore, and

• Member of the Board of Governors, International Islamic University, Islamabad.

Legal offices
Preceded by Saeeduzzaman Siddiqui	Chief Justice of Pakistan; 2000–2002	Succeeded by Bashir Jehangiri
