= Muhammad Farrukh Irfan Khan =

Former Justice of the Lahore High Court

Muhammad Farrukh Irfan Khan محمد فرخ عرفان خان

Justice of the Lahore High Court
- In office 20 February 2010 – 9 April 2019

Personal details
- Born: 23 June 1958 (age 68)
- Education: Punjab University Law College

Muhammad Farrukh Irfan Khan (Urdu: محمد فرخ عرفان خان; born 23 June 1958) is a Pakistani jurist who served as a judge of the Lahore High Court from 20 February 2010 until his resignation on 9 April 2019.

== Education ==
Khan studied at Punjab University Law College in Lahore.

== Panama Papers scandal ==
Khan's name appeared in Panama Papers in relation to having two offshore companies registered in British Virgin Islands. Anrol Limited was registered on 14 April 2000 and Tramalin Limited was registered on 24 July 2003. Khan and his daughter Maria Farrukh Irfan Khan both served as a director in both companies. He was the only judge from Pakistan whose name appeared in Panama Papers. Supreme Judicial Council of Pakistan (SJC) issued him a show cause notice in February 2017 but never continued with the proceedings until 3 January 2019 that is when it started the hearings. In March 2019, former Chief Justice of Pakistan Iftikhar Muhammad Chaudhry expressed his desire to submit an affidavit in his favour but it was not allowed as Chaudhry did not want to appear for cross-examination. When Khan was supposed to appear in front of SJC on 9 April 2019, he sent his resignation as Justice of the Lahore High Court to President of Pakistan Arif Alvi citing the reason that he was being pressurized not to dispense his judicial duties in an independent manner. In his letter to the president, he accused Mian Saqib Nisar and Asif Saeed Khosa of running biased proceedings and forgoing due process. His original retirement date was supposed to be 22 June 2020.
