= Jawwad S. Khawaja =

Pakistani judge

Jawwad Sajjad Khawaja
- جواد سجاد خواجہ

23rd Chief Justice of Pakistan
- In office 15 August 2015 – 9 September 2015
- Nominated by: Nawaz Sharif
- Appointed by: Mamnoon Hussain
- Preceded by: Nasir-ul-Mulk
- Succeeded by: Anwar Zaheer Jamali

Senior Justice of the Supreme Court of Pakistan
- In office 6 July 2014 – 16 August 2015
- Preceded by: Nasir-ul-Mulk
- Succeeded by: Anwar Zaheer Jamali

Personal details
- Born: Jawwad Sajjad Khawaja; 10 September 1950 (age 76) Wazirabad, Punjab, Pakistan
- Citizenship: Pakistan
- Spouse: Bina Jawwad (m. 1973)
- Relations: Rashta Khawaja (sister), Omar Khawaja (brother), Hasan Muttaqi Khawaja (brother), Tahira Khawaja (sister)
- Children: 4 (including Haider)
- Education: Lawrence College Ghora Gali; Aitchison College; Forman Christian College University; Punjab University Law College (LLB); University of California, Berkeley, United States (LLM)

Supreme Court of Pakistan

Jawwad Sajjad Khawaja (Urdu: جواد ایس خواجہ; born 10 September 1950), known commonly as Jawwad S. Khawaja, is a Pakistani jurist, and former professor of law at the Lahore University of Management Sciences, who served as the 23rd Chief Justice of Pakistan. He was nominated for the position by Prime Minister Nawaz Sharif on 17 August 2015, and approved to take office by President Mamnoon Hussain on the same day.

== Early life and education ==
Khawaja was born in Wazirabad, Punjab, to Kashmiri parents who had migrated to Punjab from Jammu and Kashmir, a region now administered by India. He is the youngest of five siblings. Khawaja received his early education from the Mission High School in Wazirabad as well as Lawrence College Ghora Gali near Murree, and matriculated from Aitchison College and Forman Christian College University, both in Lahore. He eventually received his LLB from Punjab University Law College and his LLM from the University of California, Berkeley.

== Legal career ==
He started his legal practice as an advocate of the Lahore High Court in 1975 and was a partner at Cornelius, Lane and Mufti, one of the largest law firms in Pakistan. In 1999, he became a judge of the Lahore High Court but resigned in 2007 in response to the maltreatment of Chief Justice Iftikhar Muhammad Chaudhry on 9 March. He joined the Law and Policy Department of the Lahore University of Management Sciences in August 2007 and served as the head of the department from October 2007 to May 2009 when he joined the Supreme Court of Pakistan.

=== Important court decisions ===
Justice Khawaja was on the bench which decided the Sindh High Court Bar Association case, in which the Court declared the state of emergency imposed by President General Pervez Musharraf on 3 November 2007 to be unconstitutional and restored most of the judges who were forced to vacate office that day. He wrote a concurrent opinion in the case declaring the National Reconciliation Ordinance to be void ab initio, and the leading opinion in the suo motu case ordering wholesale giant Makro-Habib to restore a playground in Jamshed Town on which it had established an outlet.

Justice Khawaja was one of those six judges who gave a dissenting judgement against the military courts in Pakistan, that decision came just few days before his beginning of term as CJP.

Just before finishing his term as CJP, he headed a bench which issued a landmark decision directing Government of Pakistan to adopt Urdu as an official language according to 1973 Constitution. The decision was read out in Urdu by the CJP.

== Post-retirement ==
After retiring as Chief Justice, he went back to LUMS as a scholar-in-residence.

== Personal life ==
Khawaja has been married to his first cousin, Bina Jawwad since 1973. The two share four children together; three daughters (Ismet, Zainub and Saleema) and a son, Haider. He lives with his wife and children at their farmhouse in Bedian Road, Lahore, having founded a school over there called "Harsukh", which houses the local young and underprivileged children living nearby. He also owns a residence in Islamabad.

Khawaja's late brother, Hasan Muttaqi Khawaja (1946-2019), was married to the daughter of newspaper magnate and founder of the Jang Group, Mir Khalil-ur-Rehman, until his death in February 2019.

== Memoirs ==
Khawaja is the author of Slaughtered Without a Knife: Sixteen Years a Judge, a reflective work published in 2022. This book offers an insider's perspective on the Pakistani judiciary, drawing from his experiences spanning from 1999 to 2015. Rather than a traditional autobiography, it delves into the interplay between law, institutional culture, and personal conscience, enriched with references to Sufi poetry and philosophical insights. The title alludes to a hadith emphasizing the profound responsibilities of judges.

In his memoir, Khawaja details how he bridged his legal academic background at the Lahore University of Management Sciences (LUMS) with the apex judiciary by pioneering Pakistan's first formal judicial clerkship program. Upon his elevation to the bench in late 2009, he introduced the concept of research assistants to his chamber, appointing Ehsan Ullah Shah and Sultan Babar Mirza as the first two judicial law clerks in the history of the Supreme Court of Pakistan, a practice that was later formalized court-wide in 2010.
