= Riaz Khan =

Riaz Khan may refer to:

- Riaz Khan (politician) (born 1976), Pakistani politician
- Riaz Mohammad Khan, Pakistani diplomat
- Riaz Khan Ahmadzai, perpetrator of the Würzburg train attack
- Riyaz Khan, Indian actor
- Imran Riaz Khan (born 1975), Pakistani journalist
