= 2013 Pakistani presidential election =

- 30 July 2013

509 votes in the Electoral College 255 votes needed to win
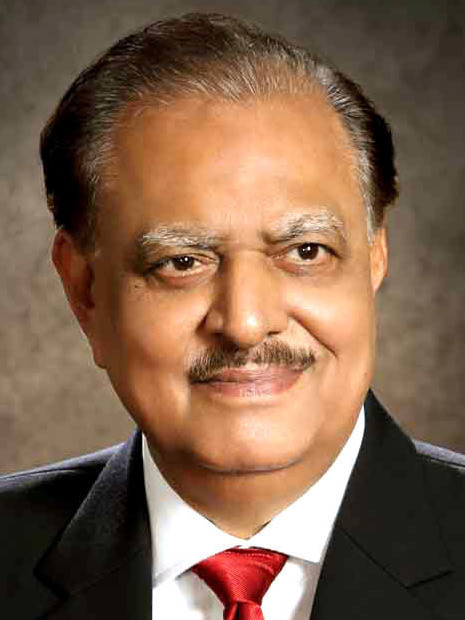

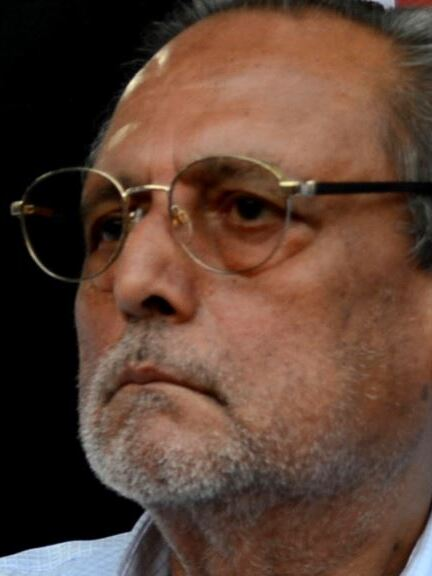
Candidate	Mamnoon Hussain	Wajihuddin Ahmed
Party	PMLN	PTI
Home state	Sindh	Sindh
Electoral vote	432	77
States carried	3 + ICT	1
Percentage	84.87%	15.13%
- Map of the election results
President of Pakistan before election
Asif Ali Zardari
PPP
President of Pakistan
Mamnoon Hussain
PMLN

Presidential elections were held on 30 July 2013 in Pakistan to elect the 12th President of Pakistan. Incumbent President Asif Ali Zardari’s term was scheduled to expire on 8 September 2013; and as such, Article 41 of the Constitution of Pakistan required the elections to be held no later than 8 August 2013. The Electoral College of Pakistan – a joint sitting of the Senate, National Assembly and Provincial Assemblies – were tasked with electing a new president to succeed President Zardari, who declined to seek a second term in office. After the Pakistan Peoples Party and its allies boycotted the presidential election, the two candidates were Mamnoon Hussain backed by the Pakistan Muslim League (N), and Wajihuddin Ahmed backed by Pakistan Tehreek-e-Insaf. Agra-born Hussain was elected president by a majority securing 432 votes. The elections were the first time in Pakistani history where a civilian president was elected while an incumbent civilian President was still in office, completing a historic and democratic transition of power that began with the 2013 General Elections.

== Background ==
Following the 2013 general elections, it was expected that the new president would be chosen by the party that won a plurality and thus headed by Prime Minister Nawaz Sharif, the Pakistan Muslim League (N). It is the first time in the country that a president elect has been chosen in the presence of a sitting president.

== Schedule ==
The Election Commission of Pakistan announced the initial election schedule on 17 July 2013. All nomination papers for candidates had to be submitted by 24 July, with scrutiny occurring on 26 July. Candidates then had an additional 3 days to withdraw their nomination, after which the official candidate list was announced. The elections were originally to take place via secret ballot on 6 August, and official results confirmed the next day. The elections would be presided by the Chief Justices of the Islamabad High Court and the 4 provincial High Courts.

The Supreme Court of Pakistan on 24 July, revised the date for the presidential election on the appeal of the ruling party, PML (N), asking the election commission to hold it on 30 July instead of 6 August. The court made the order as many of the lawmakers who will elect a replacement for President Asif Ali Zardari will be paying pilgrimages or offering special prayers on 6 August for the holy month of Ramadan, which ends a few days later, thus making it potentially difficult for some lawmakers to oblige with their religious duties along with the election. The petition was filed by the leader of the house in the Senate Raja Zafarul Haq on the same day.

The court ordered the Election Commission of Pakistan to change the election schedule on the appeal of the Federal government: nomination papers were filed on 24 July, their scrutiny was held on 26 July, the withdrawal of candidature up to 12 noon on 27 July and the final list of candidates was published at 5pm on 27 July. The polling was held on 30 July.

== Candidates ==
The PMLN nominated former Sindh Governor Mamnoon Hussain as its candidate; while the PPP nominated Senator Raza Rabbani (later boycotting); and PTI named Justice Wajihuddin Ahmed.

=== Mamnoon Hussain ===
Hussain was an Agra-born business man. He belonged to Sindh and owned a textile business in Karachi. He was born in Uttar Pradesh, India, in 1940. He started his political career in the 60s as a Muslim Leaguer. He was considered loyal to the former Prime Minister Nawaz Sharif.

In 1999, he was elected as the president of the Karachi Chamber of Commerce and Industries (KCCI) and was soon selected by Nawaz Sharif to become governor of Sindh in June 1999, but lost the post after the then Army Chief Gen Pervez Musharraf overthrew the PMLN government in a 1999 Pakistani coup d'état in October 1999.

=== Wajiuddin Ahmed ===
Ahmed is a retired senior justice of the Supreme Court of Pakistan of Pakistan, Human rights in Pakistan activist, Juris Doctor and former professor of law at the Sindh Muslim Law College.

Prior to be elevated as List of Justices of the Supreme Court of Pakistan of the Supreme Court of Pakistan, he briefly tenured as the Chief Justice of the Sindh High Court from 1998 until refusing take Legal Framework Order, 2002 in opposition to 1999 Pakistani coup d'état in 1999. He remained a strong critic of President of Pakistan Pervez Musharraf, eventually taking up a leading role in Lawyer's movement in 2007 to oppose President Musharraf. Ultimately, he unsuccessfully ran for the presidential elections held in 2007. Since 2011, he has been active in Politics of Pakistanthrough PTI and became a forerunner on PTI platform for the presidential election.

=== Boycotts ===
On 26 July, the PPP announced its decision to boycott the election. The ANP and the BNP(A) also announced a boycott. They cited as their reason the Supreme Court of Pakistan's decision to change the election date from 6 August without consulting all parties.

== Electoral College Strength ==
The Electoral College of Pakistan is formed by a joint sitting of the six leading political bodies in Pakistan:

- the Senate of Pakistan,
- the National Assembly of Pakistan,
- the Provincial Assembly of the Punjab,
- the Provincial Assembly of Sindh,
- the Provincial Assembly of Balochistan and
- the Provincial Assembly of Khyber Paktunkhwa

So that each province has an equal vote, all provincial assemblies are given exactly 65 votes in the electoral college. This mean that the each member of the Punjab Assembly has 65/370 = 0.176 votes, each member of the Sindh Assembly has 65/168 = 0.387 votes, each member of the KPK Assembly has 65/124 = 0.524 votes and each member of the Balochistan Assembly has 65/65 = 1 vote.

The political composition of these bodies is as follows:

Body	PMLN	PPP	PTI	MQM-L	JUI-F	PML-F	PkMAP	JI	NPP	PML-Q	Other/Independents/Vacant	Total
National Assembly	186	42	35	23	15	6	4	4	3	2	16	340
Senate	15	39	0	7	7	0	0	0	1	5	30	104
Punjab Assembly	304	7	26	0	1	0	0	0	0	9	23	370
Sindh Assembly	6	90	4	48	0	10	0	0	0	0	10	168
Balochistan Assembly	18	0	0	0	8	0	14	0	10	6	9	65
KPK Assembly	16	4	45	0	16	0	0	8	0	0	35	124
Total (weighted)	283	119	65	49	39	16	18	8	14	15	81	704*
Source: National Assembly seat positions are taken from National Assembly of Pakistan. These numbers reflect changes in party membership after the election (mostly benefiting the ruling party).
Senate positions are taken from the official Senate website.
Provincial Assembly positions are taken from the Election Commission of Pakistan. The ECP considers party membership on the date of the General Elections of May 2013. Several independents joined the ruling parties in each province after the election, which is not reflected in these numbers.
Fractional votes for a candidate are rounded off, therefore the total may not add to 704.
Parties belonging to the ruling PML-N coalition are mentioned in italics. These parties are likely to vote for a single candidate. In addition, several independents are also members of the ruling coalition.

== Polls ==
The country went to the polls at 10:00, 30 July amidst tight security arrangements. Over 1,174 members of the electoral college cast their votes to elect the ceremonial head of the state.

== Results ==
Polling was held simultaneously in the Parliament and provincial assemblies. The legislative assemblies were pronounced polling stations at the outset of polling. Voting ended at 15:00 and after 5 hours the preliminary result was immediately released. Official confirmation of the winner came in the evening. Mamnoon Hussain was sworn in as the 12th president of Pakistan on 9 September, a day after the incumbent President Asif Ali Zardari completed his five-year term.

Summary of the 30 July 2013 Pakistani presidential election results
Candidate	Main supporting party	Senate of Pakistan	National Assembly of Pakistan	Provincial Assembly of the Punjab	Provincial Assembly of Sindh	Provincial Assembly of Balochistan	Provincial Assembly of Khyber Pakhtunkhwa	Total
Mamnoon Hussain	PMLN	277		54.14	24.76	55	21.49	432
Wajihuddin Ahmed	PTI	34		4	1.9	1	36.17	77
Source: The News

Mamnoon Hussain was widely expected to be victorious. He got 277 votes from the Parliament, 54.14 from the Punjab Assembly, 24.76 from Sindh Assembly, 21.49 from Khyber Pakhtunkhwa Assembly and 55 from the Balochistan Assembly.

On the other hand, Justice (retd) Wajihuddin Ahmed got 34 votes from Parliament, 4 from Punjab Assembly, 1.9 from Sindh Assembly, 36.17 from Khyber Pakhtunkhwa Assembly and one vote from Balochistan Assembly.

== Implications ==
The elections were boycotted by some parties, and some protests were held too. But overall, the elections completed safe and sound. They marked a historic and democratic transition of power. This was the first time in the history of Pakistan a democratically elected civilian president had completed his full five-year term and transitioned power to a new civilian president.

== See also ==
- Election Commission of Pakistan
- President of Pakistan
- Pakistan
