= Salman Bashir =

Pakistani diplomat

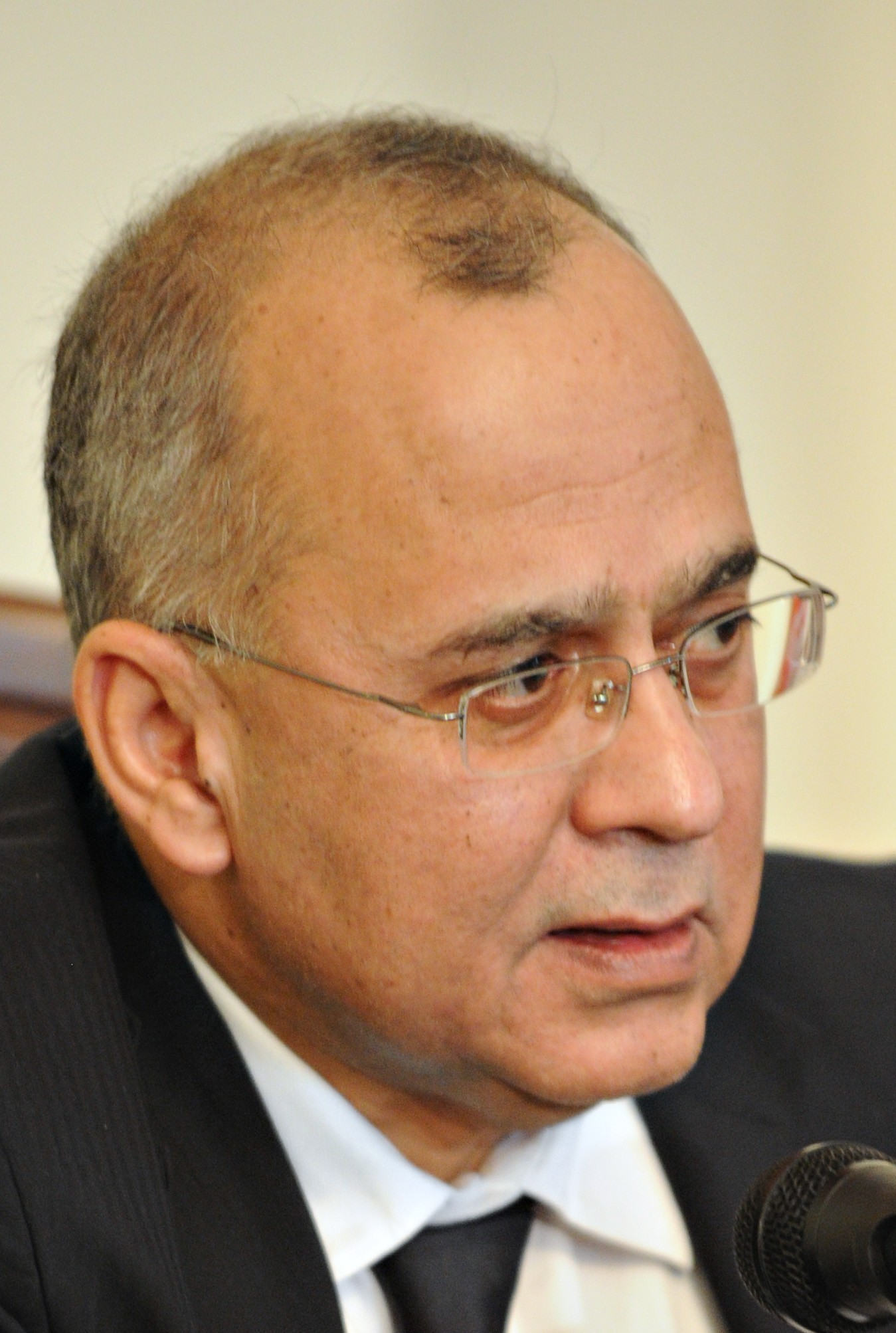
- Salman Bashir in June 2011

26th Foreign Secretary of Pakistan
- In office 3 May 2008 – March 3, 2012
- Prime Minister: Yousaf Raza Gillani
- Preceded by: Riaz Mohammad Khan
- Succeeded by: Jalil Jilani

Personal details
- Born: March 4, 1952 (age 74)
- Spouse: Tarannum
- Occupation: Diplomat

Salman Bashir (Urdu: سلمان بشیر) (born 4 March 1952) is a retired Pakistani diplomat who served in Grade 22 as the Foreign Secretary of Pakistan and as the High Commissioner of Pakistan to India.

== Early life ==
Salman Bashir did his master's degree in History and LLB degree before joining the Foreign Service of Pakistan in February 1976. He belongs to the Third Common Training Program (3rd CTP), and he won overall first position in his batch, but preferred to join Foreign Service of Pakistan instead of Pakistan Administrative Service (PAS) or Police service.

== Career ==
Salman Bashir served in the Ministry of Foreign Affairs as a section officer (1976–1980), Director (1985–1987), Director General (1995–1999) and Additional Foreign Secretary (2003–2005).

His foreign diplomatic assignments included: Pakistan Mission to the United Nations Office at Geneva (1980–1984), Organisation of the Islamic Conference Secretariat, Jeddah (1988–1995), Ambassador of Pakistan to Denmark and Lithuania (July 1999 to February 2003).

Salman Bashir was the Pakistani Ambassador to China and Mongolia from 2005 to 2008. He then replaced Riaz Mohammad Khan as the Foreign Secretary from 3 May 2008 to 3 March 2012. Salman Bashir also served as High Commissioner of Pakistan to India from 2012 to 2014.

== Personal life ==
Salman Bashir is married with two sons and a daughter. His brother, Admiral Noman Bashir, is the former Chief of Naval Staff of the Pakistan Navy.

Diplomatic posts
Preceded by	Pakistan Ambassador to Denmark; 1999 – 2003	Succeeded by
Preceded by	Pakistan Ambassador to Lithuania; 1999 – 2003	Succeeded by
Preceded by Riaz Mohammad Khan	Pakistan Ambassador to China; 2005 – 2008	Succeeded by Masood Khan
Preceded by Riaz Mohammad Khan	Pakistan Ambassador to Mongolia; 2005 – 2008	Succeeded by Masood Khan
Preceded by Riaz Mohammad Khan	Foreign Secretary of Pakistan; 2008 – 4 March 2012	Incumbent
