= Shuja-ul-Mulk =

Pakistani politician

Shuja-ul-Mulk Senator

Member of the Senate of Pakistan
- In office 2003–2009

Personal details
- Relatives: Nasir-ul-Mulk (brother)

Shuja-ul-Mulk (Pashto: شجاع الملک) is a Pakistani politician who served as a member of Senate of Pakistan between 2003 and 2009.

He is the brother of former Chief Justice of Pakistan Nasir-ul-Mulk.
