= Nazim Hussain Siddiqui =

Pakistani judge (1940–2022)

Nazim Hussain Siddiqui ناظم حسین صدیقی

19th Chief Justice of Pakistan
- In office 31 December 2003 – 29 June 2005
- Appointed by: Pervez Musharraf
- Preceded by: Sheikh Riaz Ahmad
- Succeeded by: Iftikhar Muhammad Chaudhry

Chief Justice Sindh High Court
- In office 22 April 1999 – 3 February 2000
- Preceded by: Kamal Mansur Alam
- Succeeded by: Syed Deedar Hussain Shah

Personal details
- Born: 30 June 1940 Muradabad, Uttarpardesh, British Raj (now India)
- Died: 15 January 2022 (aged 81) Karachi, Pakistan
- Spouse: Memona Nazim
- Children: 3
- Education: University of Karachi

Supreme Court of Pakistan

Nazim Hussain Siddiqui (Urdu: ناظم حسین صدیقی; 30 June 1940 – 15 January 2022) was a Pakistani jurist who served as Chief Justice of the Supreme Court of Pakistan, from 31 December 2003 to 29 June 2005.

== Life and career ==
Siddiqui was born on 30 June 1940, to the late Mukarram Hussain Siddiqui. He did his BA, LLB from the University of Hyderabad and LLM from the University of Karachi. He was the uncle of veteran Pakistani comedian and actor, Ayaz Khan.

He practised at Hyderabad from 1961 to 1967. During his career, Justice Siddiqui served as civil judge, senior civil judge, additional district and sessions judge, district and sessions judge at Sukkur and Dadu, registrar of the SHC twice, customs judge thrice, special judge anti-corruption, special judge Banking Court, chairman Commercial Court and Drug Court, member Appellate Insurance Tribunal, presiding officer Labour Court, member Supreme Appellate Court/Tribunal, chairman Institute of Business Administration (IBA), Karachi, and member Board of Governors of Indus Valley School of Karachi.

He was also serving as chairman Central Zakat Council of Pakistan, Member, Board of Governors of the Aga Khan University Hospital, Karachi; Member, Selection Board of the Quaid-i-Azam University, Islamabad.

Justice Nazim Hussain Siddiqui took oath as the new Chief Justice of Pakistan soon after President Pervez Musharraf's Constitutional Amendment which came to be known as the Seventeenth Amendment. Ten judges of the superior courts stood retired, including Supreme Court Chief Justice Sheikh Riaz Ahmad, who was replaced by Justice Nazim Hussain Siddiqui.

The president named Justice Nazim Hussain Siddiqui as the Chief Justice of Pakistan for being the senior-most judge of the Supreme Court of Pakistan and administered oath to him at the presidential camp office in Rawalpindi. The oath-taking ceremony was also attended by the then Prime Minister Zafarullah Khan Jamali besides federal ministers, services chiefs, members of Parliament, judges of the Supreme Court and senior lawyers.

Justice Siddiqui, who belonged to Sindh, was appointed judge of the Sindh High Court (SHC) in March 1992 and became chief justice of the Sindh High Court (SHC) in 1999. He was elevated as a judge of the Supreme Court of Pakistan on 4 February 2000.

He died in Karachi on 15 January 2022, at the age of 81.

== Famous cases ==
=== Case against Pervez Musharraf ===
As chief justice Siddiqui dismissed the constitutional petitions against General Pervez Musharraf's uniform saying that the reasons for the decision would be told in the detailed judgment. Later Supreme Court of Pakistan announced a detailed judgement in 6 constitutional petitions regarding Seventeenth Amendment and said that this court must have due regard for the democratic mandate given to Parliament by the people. The full bench of the Apex Court heard the case and announced short orders on 13 April 2005 after hearing the case for six days. However, it did say,

It is not for this court to substitute its views for those expressed by legislators or strike down statutes on consideration of what it deems good for the people. This court is and always has been the judge of what is constitutional but not of what is wise or good. The latter is the business of Parliament, which is accountable to the people.

Former Chief Justice of Pakistan Nasim Hasan Shah giving his remarks in a TV program said that,

The military holds the rifle and the court cannot go against the rifle.

Responding to that, Chief Justice Nazim Hussain Siddiqui remarked that personal opinion of an individual could not be attributed to the whole judiciary.

=== Shahbaaz Sharif's return to Lahore ===
As chief justice Siddiqui took the petition of former Punjab chief minister regarding permission to return to Pakistan. The court had issued notices to the federal government, the Punjab government and the director immigration for their comments on two petitions filed by Shahbaz Sharif. The short orders read,

"For reasons to be recorded later on, both these petitions are dismissed with an observation that the petitioner may come back from abroad subject to the law of the country."

The order also observed,

"During the course of argument, the learned counsel for the petitioner submitted that the petitioner is ready to face the cases registered against him. He also stated that the petitioner will not mind even if he is arrested at the airport."

Chief Justice Nazim Hussain Siddiqui said that the petitioner, being a citizen of Pakistan, has a natural and inherent right to enter and return to the country, which is guaranteed under Article 15 of the Constitution. Under Article 4 of the Constitution, he has a right to be dealt with in accordance with law and is entitled to enjoy the equal protection of law. However, Shahbaz Sharif was eventually not allowed to leave the Allama Iqbal International Airport, Lahore by the government citing National Security issues and was boarded in a plane to leave Pakistan.

=== Asif Ali Zardari ===
Asif Ali Zardari had previously been granted bail in all but one of the cases outstanding against him, including conspiring to murder Benazir Bhutto's brother, Mir Murtaza, in 1996. Pakistan's Supreme Court granted bail of 1m rupees ($16,700) in the final corruption case against him - the alleged evasion of import duties on a car (BMW).

=== Mukhtaran Mai rape case ===
Mukhtaran Mai had attracted international attention when her name was put on the Exit Control List (ECL) and her passport was seized to discourage her from visiting the US on the invitation of the Asian-American Network Against Abuse of Human Rights (ANAA). She challenged a Lahore High Court order acquitting the 12 men accused of raping her on the orders of a tribal council. The Punjab government had also appealed the judgement in the apex court.

On 14 March 2005, the Supreme Court had intervened to end an inter-court controversy in the case by staying separate orders of the Lahore High Court and the Federal Shariat Court (FSC) and deciding to hold its own hearing. The Supreme Court took up the issue when the FSC suspended the high court's acquittal of the convicts, saying this was without jurisdiction.

Taking notice of the case, Chief Justice Nazim Hussain Siddiqui had summoned the entire record of the case from the high court and the FSC, while notices were served on Punjab Advocate General Aftab Iqbal and Mukhtaran Mai. Bailable arrest warrants were also issued against the accused who have been rearrested on the directions of Prime Minister Shaukat Aziz. Pakistani President Pervez Musharraf said that he ordered that Mukhtaran be prevented from leaving as he didn't want the country's image tarnished.

=== Other services ===
Siddiqui served as the Chairman of Law & Justice Commission of Pakistan, Islamabad;The Federal Judicial Academy, Islamabad; National Judicial, (Policy making) Committee;Al-Mizan Foundation.

He also visited France twice in connection with meetings of the Agha Khan University at Paris.

He represented Pakistan in the 1st UK-Pakistan Judicial Conference on Child and Family Laws held at London from 15 to 17 January 2003.

He participated in the 2nd UK-Pakistan Judicial Conference on Child and Family Laws held at Islamabad from 21 to 24 September 2003.

He hosted and chaired the 7th SAARC Chief Justices Conferences held at Karachi on 21 February 2004. He is the only one in Pakistan and India who had started his journey from civil judge and ended his journey as Chief Justice of Pakistan.

He retired from service on 29 June 2005.

== See also ==
- Supreme Court of Pakistan

Legal offices
Preceded by Sheikh Riaz Ahmad	Chief Justice of Pakistan; 2003–2005	Succeeded by Iftikhar Muhammad Chaudhry
Preceded by Kamal Mansur Alam	Chief Justice of the Sindh High Court; 22 April 1999 – 3 February 2000	Succeeded by Syed Deedar Hussain Shah
