= Sheikh Riaz Ahmad =

Pakistani judge (born 1938)

- شیخ ریاض احمد

18th Chief Justice of Pakistan
- In office 1 February 2002 – 31 December 2003
- Appointed by: Pervez Musharraf
- Preceded by: Bashir Jehangiri
- Succeeded by: Nazim Hussain Siddiqui

Personal details
- Born: March 9, 1938 Lahore, Pakistan
- Education: University of the Punjab, Government Islamia College Civil Lines

Sheikh Riaz Ahmad (Urdu : شیخ ریاض احمد; born 9 March 1938) was a former Chief Justice of Pakistan from February 1, 2002 to December 31, 2003.

== Overview ==
Justice Sheikh Riaz Ahmad was elevated to the Supreme Court of Pakistan on February 1, 2002. Prior to this elevation, he served as a judge of the Supreme Court of Pakistan (1997–2002), Chief Justice of Lahore High Court (1997) and Judge Lahore High Court, Punjab - the largest province of Pakistan (1984–1997). Justice Ahmad worked as the Advocate General of the Punjab Province from 1980–84; and as Assistant Advocate General Punjab (1973–80). He graduated from the Government Islamia College, Civil Lines, Lahore. He was called to bar in 1959 and was a practicing criminal lawyer as well as a lecturer at the Punjab University Law College.

Justice Ahmad also served as a member of the Election Commission of Pakistan from 1990–93 and was later appointed the Federal Secretary Law, Justice and Parliamentary Affairs under the second Government of Prime Minister Benazir Bhutto.

== See also ==
- Chief Justices of Pakistan

Legal offices
Preceded by Bashir Jehangiri	Chief Justice of Pakistan; 2002–2003	Succeeded by Nazim Hussain Siddiqui
