= Nasirul Mulk =

Pakistani jurist and politician (born 1950)

- ناصر الملک

Prime Minister of Pakistan Caretaker
- In office 1 June 2018 – 18 August 2018
- President: Mamnoon Hussain
- Preceded by: Shahid Khaqan Abbasi
- Succeeded by: Imran Khan

22nd Chief Justice of Pakistan
- In office 6 July 2014 – 16 August 2015
- Appointed by: Mamnoon Hussain
- Preceded by: Tassaduq Hussain Jillani
- Succeeded by: Jawwad S. Khawaja

Senior Justice of the Supreme Court of Pakistan
- In office 11 December 2013 – 5 July 2014
- Preceded by: Tassaduq Hussain Jillani
- Succeeded by: Jawwad S. Khawaja

Chief Election Commissioner of Pakistan Acting
- In office 30 November 2013 – 2 July 2014
- President: Mamnoon Hussain
- Prime Minister: Nawaz Sharif
- Preceded by: Tassaduq Hussain Jillani
- Succeeded by: Anwar Zaheer Jamali

Justice of the Supreme Court of Pakistan
- In office 4 May 2005 – 16 August 2015
- Nominated by: Shaukat Aziz
- Appointed by: Pervez Musharraf

Chief Justice of the Peshawar High Court
- In office 31 May 2004 – 3 May 2005
- Nominated by: Ali Jan Orakzai
- Appointed by: Pervez Musharraf

Personal details
- Born: Nasir-ul-Mulk; 17 August 1950 (age 76) Swat State, Pakistan
- Citizenship: Pakistan
- Relations: Shuja-ul-Mulk (brother)
- Parent: Kamran Khan (father)
- Education: Peshawar University (BA, LLB)

Supreme Court of Pakistan

Nasirul Mulk (Urdu: ناصر الملک; Pashto: ناصر الملک; born 17 August 1950) is a Pakistani jurist and politician who served as the seventh caretaker prime minister of Pakistan in 2018, and previously also served as the 22nd chief justice of Pakistan from 2014 to 2015. A jurist by profession, he was nominated as Chief Justice by Prime Minister Nawaz Sharif. On 6 July 2014, his appointment as CJP was confirmed by President Mamnoon Hussain. He also previously served as the country's acting Chief Election Commissioner, from 30 November 2013 to 6 July 2014.

Prior to being elevated as Senior Justice in 2005, Mulk tenured as the chief justice of Peshawar High Court in 2004. After joining the Supreme Court, Mulk took a textualist approach on human rights and non-discrimination issues.

On 28 May 2018, he was appointed as caretaker prime minister ahead of the general elections scheduled in July 2018.

== Biography ==
=== Education and background ===
Nasirul Mulk was born in tourist locality Swat, Khyber Pakhtunkhwa, on 17 August 1950. He hails from a wealthy and politically influential Mitravi Swati Pashtoon family in Swat; his father Kamran Khan was a politician who served as Senator in Senate between 1973 and 1977. His younger brother, Shuja-ul-Mulk, also served as Senator between 2003 and 2009. His uncle, Chacha Karim Bux (or Baksh) was a prominent social worker, while his another sibling Rafil-ul-Mulk was a past mayor of Swat.

After completing high school from Abbottabad Public School, Mulk attended the Jahanzeb College where he attained BA in Fine Arts in 1970. He enrolled in Peshawar University to study law, also the same year. He excelled well in his law studies and, at one point, his university professors noted him as "talented and a bright student".

In 1972, he obtained a Bachelor of Laws from the Peshawar University. In 1976, Mulk qualified as a barrister and was called to the bar by the Inner Temple in England. He also acquired a Master of Laws (LL.M.) qualification.

== Academia and professional career ==
Upon returning to Pakistan, Mulk practiced law at Peshawar High Court, and briefly tenured as professor of law at the Peshawar University while practicing as a legal practitioner at Peshawar. He also lectured courses on civil law as visiting scholar at the Pakistan Administrative Staff College. Mulk was regarded as notable professor of law at the Peshawar University, and his students often remembered him as "a professor who had complete command on his subject and avoided controversies." Mulk was noted his college students as he always came into the classroom well prepared.

Mulk practiced law for over 17 years at the Peshawar High Court where he built his reputation for competency and a positive approach toward the cases he contested. Mulk was elected Secretary-General of the Peshawar High Court Bar in 1981. He later became president of Peshawar High Court Bar on two occasions, first elected in 1990 and again in 1993. From 1993–94, Mulk was appointed as an advocate general of provincial government of Khyber–Pakhtunkhwa, assisting in legal matters and affairs.

== Judicial career ==
After meeting qualifications for being a judge, Mulk was ascended as judge at the Peshawar High Court on 6 June 1994—a post he retained until 2004. Recommendations approved by Governor of Khyber-Pakhtunkhwa, Mulk was appointed as Chief Justice of Peshawar High Court on 31 July 2004, and moved to Supreme Court of Pakistan in 2005.

Justice Mulk presided and heard the Mukhtār Mā'ī case—the controversial and highly publicized case regarded a gang rape that occurred in 2002. Mulk's judgement held Jirga, facilitated by four male, responsible for the rape while assisted the main accused but didn't find sufficient evidence to stamp the charge of gang-rape on the accused. He reportedly penned his judgement that "Jirgas cannot be allowed to arbitrarily punish in the form of watta satta marriages and gang-rape to settle disputes without being answerable to the law.

On 2 November 2007, Barrister Aitzaz Ahsan submitted an application to the Supreme Court asking that the government be restrained from imposing martial law in Pakistan. Reviewing the application, a seven-panel bench in Supreme Court of Pakistan issued an injunction against the imposition of state emergency on 3 November 2007.

The bench penal was headed by Chief Justice Iftikhar Mohammad Chaudhry. Others included Senior Justices Nasir-ul-Mulk; Rana Bhagwandas; Javaid Iqbal; Shakirullah Jan; Fayyaz Ahmad; Ghulam Rabbani. The injunction was overruled by President Pervez Musharraf and upheld the state emergency imposed on 2 November 2007. He refused to take an oath under PCO 2007 and was ultimately terminated from the Supreme Court. A strong, publicly instigated lawyer's movement which enjoyed support from PML(N) forced President Musharraf to resign in a threat to face impeachment. Mulk was reinstated at the Supreme Court when he took a fresh oath as a judge of the Supreme Court with his seniority intact.

=== As Chief Justice of Pakistan ===
If Pakistan's state institutions differ on implementation of the Constitution, the Supreme Court has the right to intervene, hinting at the same..

— Chief Justice Nasir-ul-Mulk, Cited source

He was appointed as Chief Justice on 6 July 2014.

Earlier, he was served as the acting Chief Election Commissioner of Pakistan, from 30 November 2013 to 6 July 2014. His oath was presided by President Mamnoon Hussain in a state ceremony held in President's office in Islamabad. The outgoing Chief Justice Tassaduq Hussain Jillani had laid down the judicial robes of his office on and handed over to Chief Justice Mulk.

Mulk is described by his fellow judges as "a very proactive judge and is very strict about the implementation of law in its letter and spirit." Mulk is also known for his strictness towards implementation of law and his judgement reflected a textualist approach on human rights and non-discrimination issues. He retired as Chief Justice of Pakistan on 16 July 2015 and was succeeded by Jawad S Khwaja.

== As caretaker prime minister ==
Shahid Khaqan Abbasi was to complete his tenure as Prime Minister on 31 May 2018. On 28 May, three days before the Abbasi government would complete its five years term, both Abbasi and leader of opposition Syed Khurshid Ahmed Shah agreed on appointing Nasir as the interim Prime Minister of Pakistan. In consequence of their decision, Mulk, in an oath taking ceremony at Presidency Palace, was sworn in as caretaker prime minister of Pakistan.

As caretaker prime minister, his first action was to reshuffle the bureaucracy, the key changes being the appointment of Suhail Aamir as his Principal Secretary and Syed Abu Ahmad Akif as the Cabinet Secretary of Pakistan. During his first few days as prime minister, he instructed the legal team of government to file an appeal against a Lahore High Court decision which has annulled the nomination papers for elections.

=== Cabinet ===
Mulk appointed his cabinet on 5 June 2018, the table below shows the members and their portfolios:

Mulk Cabinet
Shamshad Akhtar	Minister for Finance and Planning
Abdullah Hussain Haroon	Minister for Foreign Affairs, Defence and National Security Division
Muhammad Azam Khan	Minister for Interior
Barrister Syed Ali Zafar	Minister for Law, Justice, Information and Parliamentary Affairs
Roshan Khursheed Bharucha	Minister for Human Rights and Frontier Regions
Muhammad Yousuf Shaikh	Minister for Education and Health

== See also ==
- Haziqul Khairi
- Iftikhar Muhammad Choudhary
- Tassaduq Hussain Jillani
- Supreme Court of Pakistan
- Constitution of Pakistan
- Chief Justice of Pakistan

Legal offices
Preceded by Tassaduq Hussain Jillani	Chief Justice of Pakistan; 2014—2015	Succeeded by Jawwad S. Khawaja
Political offices
Preceded by Shahid Khaqan Abbasi	Prime Minister of Pakistan; Caretaker; 2018	Succeeded by Imran Khan
