= Wajihuddin Ahmed =

Pakistani activist

The Honorable Wajihuddin Ahmed وجیہ الدین احمد
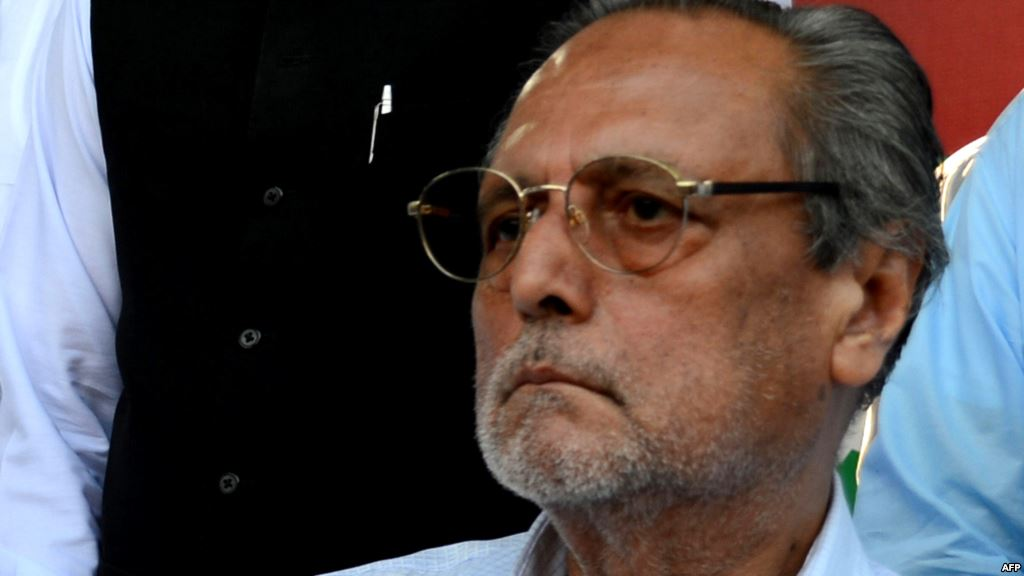

Senior Justice of the Supreme Court of Pakistan
- In office 5 May 1998 – 12 October 1999
- Nominated by: Nawaz Sharif
- Appointed by: Rafiq Tarar

Chief Justice Sindh High Court
- In office 5 November 1997 – 4 May 1998
- Preceded by: Mamoon Kazi
- Succeeded by: Kamal Mansur Alam

Personal details
- Born: 1 December 1938 (age 87) New Delhi, British India
- Citizenship: British subject (1938–1947); Pakistan (1947–)
- Other political affiliations: PTI (2013-2016)
- Education: Forman Christian College University; Sindh Muslim College
- Occupation: Jurist, judge
- Profession: Legal scholar
- Cabinet: Nawaz Government

Wajihuddin Ahmed (Urdu: وجیہ الدین احمد; born 1 December 1938) is a retired senior justice of the Supreme Court of Pakistan, human rights activist, and former professor of law at the Sindh Muslim Law College.

Prior to being elevated as Senior Justice of the Supreme Court, he had a brief tenure as the Chief Justice of the Sindh High Court from 1998 until refusing to take oath in opposition to the martial law in 1999. He remained a strong critic of President Pervez Musharraf, eventually taking up a leading role in the Lawyers' Movement in 2007 to oppose President Musharraf. Ultimately, he unsuccessfully ran for the presidential elections held in 2007. Since 2011, he was active in national politics through Pakistan Tehreek-e-Insaf (PTI), being the party's candidate for the presidential election 2013. He lost the election on 30 July 2013 to Mamnoon Hussain of Pakistan Muslim League (N).

In 2016, he left Pakistan Tehreek-e-Insaf. and started his own party under the name Aam Loeg Ittehad.

== Biography ==
=== Early life and education ===
Wajihuddin Ahmed was born into a family of practising lawyer in New Delhi, British India, on 1 December 1938. His father, Waheeduddin Ahmed, was also a jurist and had held a prestigious position in Delhi High Court; his family migrated to Pakistan after independence in 1947. His father, Waheeduddin Ahmed, a respected judge, eventually became the Chief Justice of Sindh High Court and later a senior justice of the Supreme Court of Pakistan.

Upon settling in Karachi, Wajihuddin Ahmed attended and matriculated from Sindh Islamic Monastery, moving to Lahore in Punjab for his further studies. He enrolled at the Forman Christian College University where he attained BA in Liberal Arts in 1962. In 1963, he enrolled in Sindh Muslim College to study law and eventually graduated with a LLB degree in 1966. In 1967, he began his doctoral studies in law at the Karachi University; he was awarded JD degree by Karachi University in 1971.

He avoided holding any judicial office, whether elected or appointed, during his father's tenure as a judge. Therefore, he remained associated with the S.M. Law College as a professor of law, delivering lectures and teaching law for undergraduate and post-graduate level courses.

== Career ==
Son of the highly reputed Chief Justice of the West Pakistan High Court and judge of the Supreme Court of Pakistan, Justice Waheeduddin Ahmed, Justice Wajih enrolled as an advocate of the Sindh High Court and remained Lecturer at the S.M. Law College for LL. B. and LL. M. classes. He was consecutively elected as president Sindh High Court Bar Association unopposed in 1977 and 1978 and elected President of Karachi Bar Association in 1981. Advocate Wajih was appointed Standing Counsel for Federal Government in 1984 and Advocate General Sindh on 19 November 1986 and elevated to the Bench of the SHC as a Judge in 1988. He became the Chief Justice of the Sindh High Court from 5 November 1997 to 4 May 1998 and moved to the Supreme Court in 1998. During his tenure as SHC CJ, most sou moto actions were taken. He acted as Returning Officer during 1997 Presidential Elections and then appeared as presidential candidate against Musharraf in 2007. Justice Wajih joined the Pakistan Tehreek-e-Insaf (PTI) on 10 January 2011. He left Pakistan Tehreek-e-Insaf in 2016, stating that the party had reached a stage "where neither am I interested to remain part of it, nor is there space for people like me.” He started his own party under the name Aam Loeg Ittehad.

== 2013 Presidential election ==
On 30 July 2013, he was the only opponent of Mamnoon Hussain to become the next president of Pakistan. Ahmed received 77 votes and Hussain got 432 votes.

== See also ==
- Supreme Court of Pakistan

== Notes ==
Legal offices
Preceded by Mamoon Kazi	Chief Justice of the Sindh High Court; 5 November 1997 – 4 May 1998	Succeeded by Kamal Mansur Alam
