= Waheeduddin Ahmed =

Pakistani jurist

Chief Justice of the West Pakistan High Court

Justice of the Supreme Court of Pakistan
- In office 22 September 1969 – 20 September 1974

Ad hoc Justice of the Supreme Court of Pakistan
- In office 23 May 1977 – 6 February 1979

Personal details
- Profession: Jurist
- Awards: Hilal-i-Imtiaz

Waheeduddin Ahmed was a Pakistani jurist who served as chief justice of the West Pakistan High Court and later as a judge of the Supreme Court of Pakistan. His son, Wajihuddin Ahmed, also served as a justice of the Supreme Court.

== Career ==
Ahmed was appointed as a judge of the Supreme Court of Pakistan on 22 September 1969 and retired on 20 September 1974. He later returned to the court as an ad hoc judge from 23 May 1977 to 6 February 1979.

Later, he served as chief justice of the West Pakistan High Court. In 1978, he fell ill while sitting on the Supreme Court bench hearing the appeal against the death sentence awarded to Zulfikar Ali Bhutto.

Ahmed was the founding member of the Karachi law firm Ahmed & Qazi, established in 1947. He later received the Hilal-i-Imtiaz.
