= Bashir Jehangiri =

Pakistani judge (1937–2020)

Bashir Jehangiri محمد بشیر جہانگیری

17th Chief Justice of Pakistan
- In office 7 January 2002 – 31 January 2002
- Appointed by: Pervez Musharraf
- Preceded by: Irshad Hasan Khan
- Succeeded by: Sheikh Riaz Ahmad

Personal details
- Born: 1 February 1937 Mansehra, British Raj (now Pakistan)
- Died: 13 April 2020 (aged 83) Pakistan
- Education: University of Peshawar

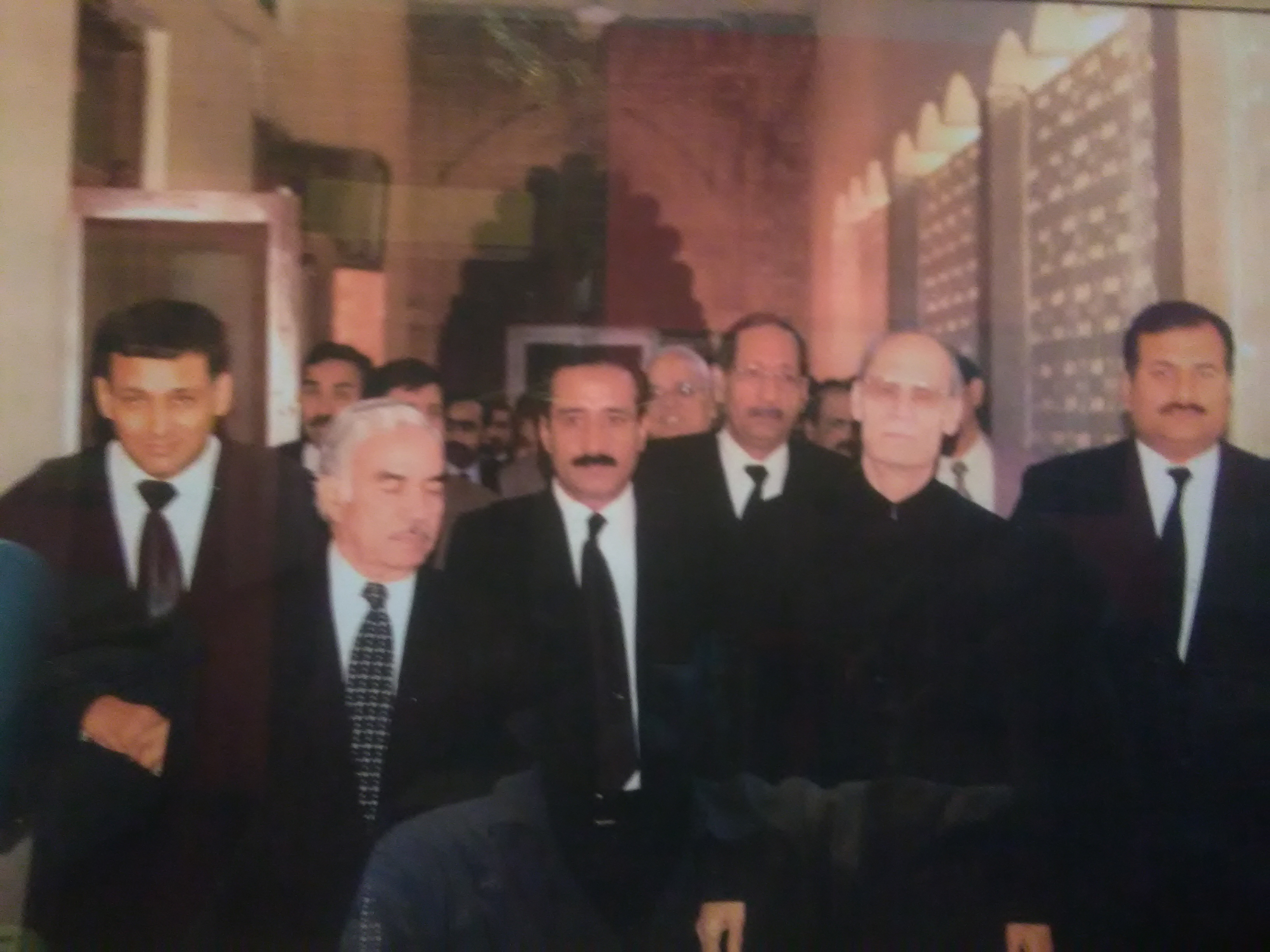
left to right Akhtar Aly Kureshy, Asrar-ul-Haq Mian President of Lahore High Court Bar Association, Muhammad Ahsan Bhoon, Chief Justice Pakistan Justice Muhammad Bashir Jehangiri, Rana Mashood Ahmad Khan Secretary Bar.

Muhammad Bashir Jehangiri Swati (Urdu: محمد بشیر جہانگیری; 1 February 1937 – 13 April 2020) was a Pakistani judge who served as the Chief Justice of Pakistan from January 7 to January 31 , 2002. Previously, he served as Chief Justice of the Peshawar High Court. He did his 20 years of law practice at Peshawar High Court and the Supreme Court of Pakistan.

Jehangiri died on 13 April 2020, at the age of 83.

== See also ==
- Chief Justices of Pakistan

Legal offices
Preceded by Irshad Hasan Khan	Chief Justice of Pakistan; 2002	Succeeded by Sheikh Riaz Ahmad
