= Murder of Shahzeb Khan =

2012 murder in Karachi, Pakistan

- Location: 24°51′36″N 67°0′36″E; Karachi, Pakistan
- Date: 25 December 2012 (PST UTC+5:00)
- Attack type: Shooting
- Weapon: Gun
- Deaths: 1
- Victim: Shahzeb Khan
- Perpetrators: Shahrukh Jatoi and Siraj Talpur aided by Sajjad Talpur and Ghulam Murtaza Lashari
- No. of participants: 4
- Motive: Revenge

On 25 December 2012, university student Shahzeb Khan was murdered in a targeted revenge killing in Karachi, Pakistan. The initial lack of action from police in apprehending Shahzeb Khan's killers sparked countrywide outrage and protests against the abuse of power by the wealthy in Pakistan. On 7 June 2013, Shahrukh Jatoi, son of feudal Sikandar Jatoi and Siraj Talpur, from the Talpur clan, were sentenced to death for this crime, while Sajjad Solangi and Ghulam Murtaza Lashari were sentenced to life imprisonment for aiding the two killers. However, in September 2013 Shahzeb's parents, DSP Aurangzeb Khan and Ambreen Aurangzeb, decided to file an affidavit with the court pardoning all four accused and requesting their release, the Sindh High Court released the culprits on 23 December 2017. On 1 February 2018 the Supreme Court of Pakistan ordered both the case to be reopened before the SHC and the accused persons to be retaken into custody.

== Details ==
During the night of 24 December 2012, Shahzeb Khan's sister was on her way back home from their sister's Walima reception. She was being harassed by Ghulam Murtaza Lashari, which resulted in a fight between Shahzeb on one side and the Talpurs, accompanied by their friend Shahrukh Jatoi on the other side. After the fight had ended Shahrukh and Siraj eventually traced Shahzeb again and gunned him down.

Initially, no arrests were made, which caused a significant social media movement demanding justice for Shahzeb Khan. On 7 January 2013, Siraj Talpur, Sajjad Talpur and Ghulam Murtaza Lashari were arrested in connection with the murder. Shahrukh Jatoi had fled to Dubai in the meantime, but was later arrested as well. Eyewitnesses then identified the suspects. After several changes of prosecution personnel, the charges were finally filed in March. In June 2013 the main accused, Shahrukh Jatoi and Siraj Talpur were sentenced to death. The fact that Jatoi was seen smiling into the cameras even at the time when the verdict was read, triggered a lot of negative reactions among the general public in Pakistan.

In 2013 the parents of the Shahzeb filed an affidavit with the court pardoning all four accused and requesting their release. The mother, Ambreen Aurangzeb was quoted as saying “We may not have forgiven them in our hearts, but we have pardoned our son’s killers in the name of Allah. We cannot spend our entire lives in fear… we took the decision considering the circumstances.”

The high-profile murder case of Karachi's young boy Shahzeb Khan took a new dramatic twist on 28 November 2017, as Sindh High Court (SHC) set aside death sentence awarded to Shahrukh Jatoi and ordered retrial of the case.

On 23 December 2017, Shahrukh Jatoi among other suspects were released on bails on late Saturday after Sindh High Court (SHC) ordered their release in a hearing earlier today in Shahzaib murder case. According to details, the court ordered the suspects to submit surety bonds worth Rs5 lac in this regard. The decision was made after Shahzaib's father submitted agreement copy in the court. "Shahzaib’s family forgave (Shahrukh Jatoi) in the name of Allah. They didn’t take any cash," brother Ashraf Jatoi said while talking to media. “What Shahrukh Jatoi and his friends did was wrong.” Earlier, SHC had suspended death sentences awarded to criminals Shahrukh Jatoi and Siraj Talpur, saying that the session court would look into the terror sections in the case. But after the appeal made in SC against the High Court's decision by civil society, SC on hearing on 13 January rejected the bails of culprits and ordered to arrest them and put their name in ECL within 24 hours.

On 10 January 2022, Geo News revealed that on a complaint of backache and gastric problems, Shahrukh Jatoi had been transferred to a private hospital where an entire floor had been rented for him and where he was living a ʻlavishʼ lifestyle, free to come and go, without any police presence. Within 24 hours of this news, he had been shifted back to Jail.

On 18 October 2022, the Supreme Court acquitted him and his accomplices Sajjad Ali Talpur and Ghulam Murtaza Lashari of all charges.

On 23 Nov 2022, Shahzeb Khan’s murderer Shahrukh Jatoi suspect has been released from Malir Jail after 10 years. The Pakistani Supreme Court acquitted the Shahzeb murderers last month.

== In popular culture ==
The famous novel "Namal" by Nemrah Ahmed and the GeoTV drama "Khaani" by Feroz Khan are also loosely based on it.
