= 2007 Pakistani presidential election =

- 6 October 2007

679 votes in the Electoral College 440 votes needed to win
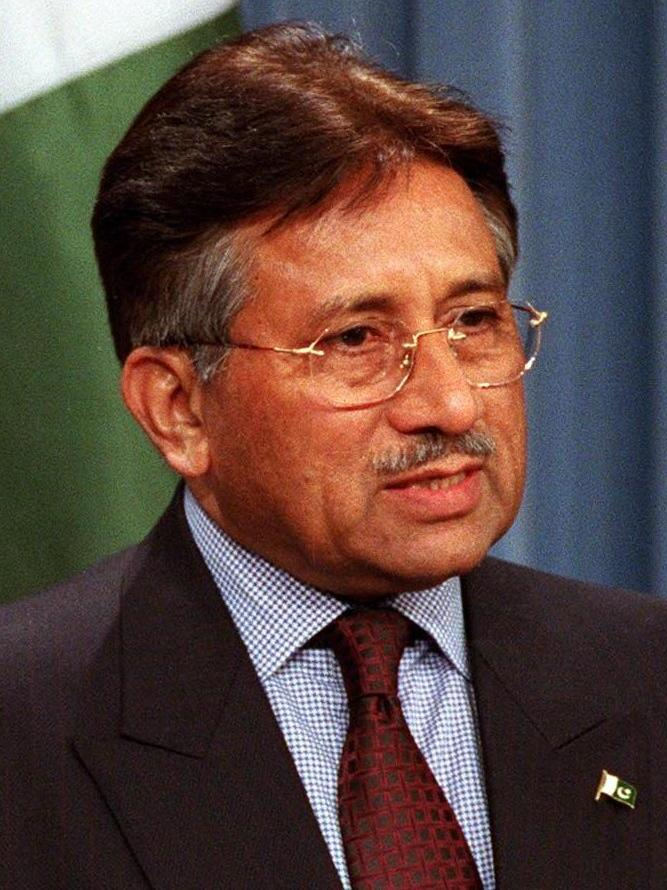

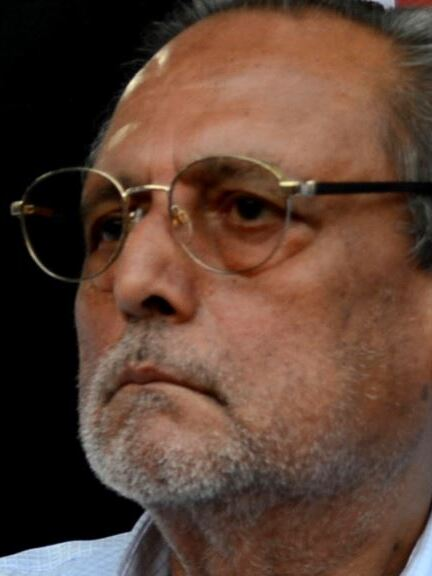
Nominee	Pervez Musharraf	Wajihuddin Ahmed
Party	PML(Q)	Independent
Home state	Sindh	Sindh
Electoral vote	671	8
States carried	4 + ICT	0
Percentage	98.82%	1.18%
President before election
Pervez Musharraf
PML(Q)
Elected President
Pervez Musharraf
PML(Q)

An indirect presidential election was held in Pakistan on 6 October 2007. This was before dissolution of parliament for the following general election to be held in 2008. The Pakistani legislature elected incumbent Pervez Musharraf by an overwhelming majority. The near-unanimous nature of Musharraf's victory was made possible by the absence of two key political opposition leaders, Nawaz Sharif and Benazir Bhutto. Nawaz Sharif had attempted to return to Pakistan before the election but was deported back into exile by the ruling government because of a gross violation of the agreement he had signed with the current regime to stay out of Pakistan and its politics for a period of ten years. Benazir Bhutto had also announced her intention to return to Pakistan for the elections but ultimately decided not to do so. It was widely assumed that her decision was the result of an arrangement she made with Musharraf.

== Candidates ==
Wajihuddin Ahmed filed his candidacy to stand for a group of lawyers opposed to Musharraf, while the Pakistan Peoples Party fielded its vice president Ameen Faheem as a candidate, though he stated he would withdraw his candidacy if Musharraf were approved as a candidate. The Supreme Court decided on 28 September 2007 that Musharraf could stand in the election. On 29 September 2007, the Election Commission scrutinised the nomination papers of all 43 candidates. Musharraf and both of his major opponents (Ahmed and Fahim) were approved, along with three others; the official list of candidates was announced to be publicised on 1 October 2007.

On 1 October 2007, a final list of five candidates was announced:

- Pervez Musharraf, the incumbent, for the Pakistan Muslim League (Q);
- Wajihuddin Ahmed, a former Supreme Court judge, for an association of lawyers opposed to Musharraf;
- Ameen Faheem for the Pakistan Peoples Party;
- Muhammad Mian Soomro, chairman of the Senate of Pakistan, as Musharraf's backup candidate;
- Faryal Talpur, deputy mayor of the southern city of Nawabshah, as Fahim's backup candidate.

== Results ==
Musharraf overwhelmingly won the election on 6 October, though the opposition had boycotted the election and other candidates withdrew from the election. 80 opposition party members had resigned from parliament, protesting that Musharraf was running for re-election while remaining head of the army. The Pakistan Peoples Party, led by Benazir Bhutto, only abstained from the vote—a move that prevented the vote from being invalid. In the National parliaments, Musharraf received 252 votes, against Wajihuddin Ahmed's two votes and the results from the provincial parliaments were similar.

Complete results were announced only 80 minutes after the five-hours-long voting process had been finished, with 685 of the 1,170 eligible lawmakers participating. The results were:

- Pervez Musharraf: 671 votes
- Wajihuddin Ahmed: 8 votes
- Invalid: 6 votes

The Supreme Court rejected all challenges to the legality of the election, with the last ruling made on 2007-11-22.

== International reaction ==
International reaction to the election has been mixed, with commentators praising the fact that Pakistan is moving in the direction of democracy but critics pointing out that, among other factors, the boycotting of the election puts its results into doubt. The George W. Bush administration has long supported Musharraf's administration for maintaining stability but expressed a concern that all parties need to take part in order for an election to be truly democratic.

== Literature ==
- Schoresch Davoodi & Adama Sow: The Political Crisis of Pakistan in 2007 - EPU Research Papers: Issue 08/07, Stadtschlaining 2007
