= Riaz Mohammad Khan =

Pakistani diplomat

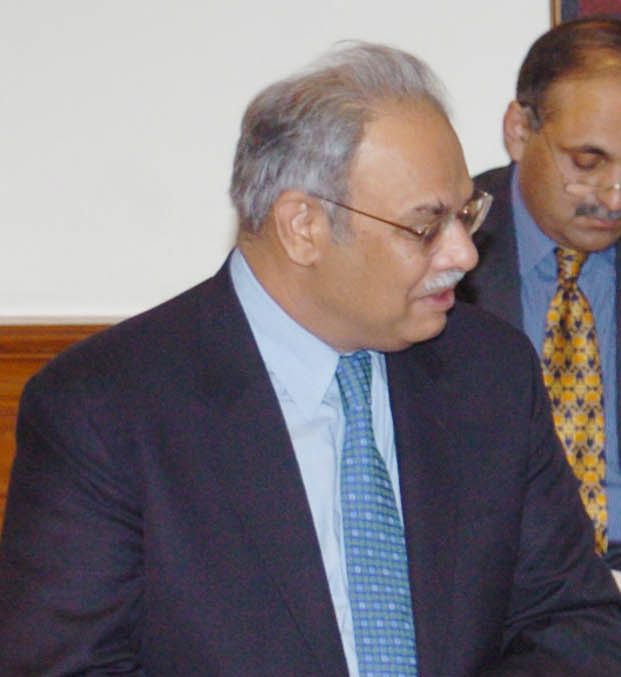

Foreign Secretary of Pakistan
- In office 2005–2008
- Preceded by: Riaz Khokhar
- Succeeded by: Salman Bashir

Ambassador of Pakistan to China
- In office 2002–2005

Ambassador to Belgium, Luxembourg and the European Union
- In office 1995–1998

Ambassador to Kazakhstan and Kyrgyzstan
- In office 1992–1995

Personal details
- Education: Punjab University, Lahore
- Profession: Diplomat

Riaz Mohammad Khan holds a master's degree in mathematics and a B.A. (honors) from Punjab University, Lahore.

Prior to joining Pakistan's Foreign Service in 1969, Khan taught quantum physics from 1965 to 1969 as assistant professor in the Mathematics Department at Punjab University, Lahore. His diplomatic career began with a posting to Beijing in 1970. He then served seven years at Pakistan's Mission to the United Nations in New York City from 1979 to 1986. Khan remained director general of Afghanistan and Soviet affairs at the Foreign Office, during which time he took a sabbatical to serve as a diplomat-in-residence at Georgetown University's Institute for the Study of Diplomacy. His other assignments include:

- served as Pakistan's first ambassador to Kazakhstan and Kyrgyzstan (1992–1995).
- Ambassador to Belgium, Luxembourg and the European Union (1995–1998).
- Additional Secretary in charge of international organizations and arms control issues for Pakistan's Ministry of Foreign Affairs (1998–2002).
- Spokesman of the Foreign Office (2000–2001).

Khan's last field assignment was as Ambassador of Pakistan to China from 2002 to 2005. He served as Pakistan's foreign secretary from 2005 to 2008. He retired from service in 2008. After his retirement from the Foreign Service, he spent a year as a scholar at the Woodrow Wilson Center in Washington, D.C. He also served as Pakistan's envoy for "back channel" diplomacy with India from 2009 to 2012.

== Books written by Khan ==
- Untying the Afghan Knot: Negotiating Soviet Withdrawal (Duke University Press, 1991)
- Afghanistan and Pakistan: Conflict, Extremism and Resistance to Modernity (Woodrow Wilson Center, Johns Hopkins URiaz Mohammad Khan | Wilson Centerniversity Press, Oxford University Press, 2011).

== See also ==
- Foreign Secretary (Pakistan)
