= Gulzar Ahmed =

Pakistani jurist (born 1957)

- گلزار احمد

27th Chief Justice of Pakistan
- In office 21 December 2019 – 1 February 2022
- Appointed by: Arif Alvi
- Preceded by: Asif Saeed Khosa
- Succeeded by: Umar Ata Bandial

Senior Justice of the Supreme Court of Pakistan
- In office 18 January 2019 – 20 December 2019
- Preceded by: Asif Saeed Khan Khosa
- Succeeded by: Mushir Alam

Justice of the Supreme Court of Pakistan
- In office 16 November 2011 – 1 February 2022
- Appointed by: Asif Ali Zardari

Justice of the Sindh High Court
- In office 27 August 2002 – 16 November 2011

Personal details
- Born: 2 February 1957 (age 69) Karachi, Federal Capital Territory, Pakistan
- Parent: Noor Muhammad (father)
- Education: Gulistan School, Karachi (elementary); Government National College, Karachi (B.A); Sindh Muslim Law College

Supreme Court of Pakistan

Gulzar Ahmed (Urdu: گلزار احمد; born 2 February 1957) is a Pakistani jurist who served as the 27th Chief Justice of Pakistan from 21 December 2019 to 1 February 2022.

== Early life and education ==
Ahmed's father, Noor Muhammad, was a lawyer in Karachi. Ahmed completed his elementary education from Gulistan Shah Abdul Latif School in Karachi. He obtained his Bachelor of Arts degree from Government National College, Karachi. He went on to obtain his law degree from Sindh Muslim Law College.

== Judicial career ==
Ahmed started his legal career as an advocate on 18 January 1986 and joined the Sindh High Court Bar Association (SHCBA) on 4 April 1988. He joined the Supreme Court Bar Association on 15 September 2001. He was elected honorary secretary of SHCBA from 1999 to 2000. He became a justice of the Sindh High Court and was appointed as a justice in the Supreme Court of Pakistan on 16 November 2011. Ahmed was part of the five-judge bench which disqualified the-then Prime Minister Nawaz Sharif in the Panama Papers case, and wrote a dissenting opinion in the split verdict.

On 4 December 2019, the law ministry notified the appointment of Ahmed Chief Justice of Pakistan (CJP) upon approval by President Arif Alvi. On 21 December 2019, Ahmed took oath as the CJP following the retirement of Asif Saeed Khosa.

On February 11, a five-judge bench of the Supreme Court headed by Chief Justice Gulzar Ahmed had issued an order banning Justice Isa from hearing cases involving Prime Minister Imran Khan, stating that justice Qazi Faez Isa had already filed a petition against the prime minister in his personal capacity against the proposed plan to distribute Rs500 million development fund each among PTI lawmakers. A senior member of the Pakistan Bar Council (PBC) Munir Kakar and vice chairman of the Balochistan Bar Council (BBC) Qasim Ali Gajaizi and the chairman of the executive committee (BBC) in a statement regretted that such a directive was against legal and constitutional principles, especially when a 10-judge Supreme Court bench had already quashed the presidential reference filed against Justice Isa — a reference which they said was based on malice.

In June 2021, he ordered demolition of properties across Karachi.
