= Saqib Nisar =

Mian Saqib Nisar
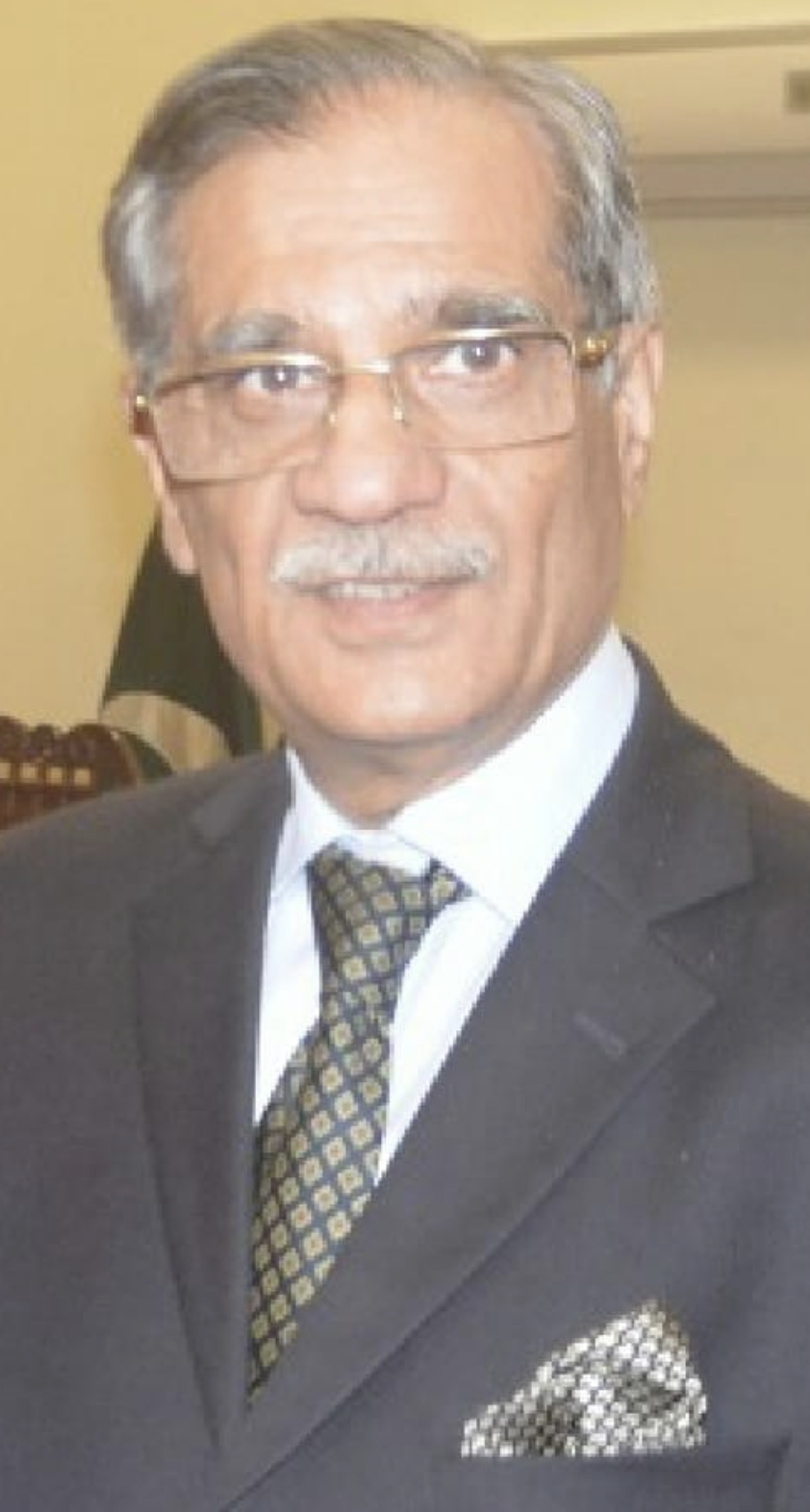
- Justice Nisar in 2018

25th Chief Justice of Pakistan
- In office 31 December 2016 – 17 January 2019
- Preceded by: Anwar Zaheer Jamali
- Succeeded by: Asif Saeed Khosa

Senior Justice of the Supreme Court of Pakistan
- In office 18 February 2010 – 30 December 2016
- Preceded by: Anwar Zaheer Jamali
- Succeeded by: Asif Saeed Khosa

Justice of the Lahore High Court
- In office 22 May 1998 – 17 February 2010

Law Secretary of Pakistan
- In office 29 March 1997 – 12 October 1999

Advocate-on-Record of the Supreme Court
- In office 22 May 1994 – 21 May 1998

Secretary General of Lahore High Court Bar Association
- In office 1991–1992

Personal details
- Born: Mian Saqib Nisar; 18 January 1954 (age 72) Lahore, Punjab, Pakistan
- Education: Government College University; Punjab University
- Profession: Advocate

"Pakistan: General Elections Subverted By Army-Judiciary Nexus – Analysis". eurasiareview.com. 6 July 2018.

Mian Saqib Nisar (Urdu: میاں ثاقب نثار; born 18 January 1954) is a Pakistani jurist who served as the 25th Chief Justice of Pakistan from 31 December 2016 till 17 January 2019. He was previously the federal Law Secretary. He was also a visiting professor of law at the University of the Punjab, teaching constitutional law.

Nisar has been criticized by respected journalists for over-involvement in affairs of the government, and for colluding with Pakistan's military establishment against a democratically elected government in 2017.

Appointed as a judge of the Supreme Court on 18 February 2010, he was elevated as chief justice when Justice Anwar Zaheer Jamali reached his constitutionally set retiring age.

== Early life and education ==
Nisar was born in 1954 in Lahore, West Punjab, into a Punjabi Muslim Arain family. His father, Mian Nisar was an advocate. Nisar was educated at the Cathedral High School, Lahore where he matriculated and enrolled at Government College University (GCU) where he graduated with a B.A. degree in 1977. He later joined Punjab University Law College where he secured LLB in civil law in 1980. He took active part in co-curricular activities during his study. He was also a part of Law College's debating society.

While being an undergraduate student at the GCU Lahore, he was selected to be a member of the international delegation representing Pakistan in International Youth Conference held in Tripoli in Libya in 1973.

== Legal career ==
=== Early career ===
Soon after his graduation with a law degree, Nisar enrolled as an advocate and began private practice of law at the District Court in 1980. In 1982, he enrolled as an advocate of the Lahore High Court. He practiced law as an advocate for a decade until he enrolled as an advocate Supreme Court in 1992, subsequently relocating to Islamabad. In 1991, he was elected as a Secretary-General of the Lahore High Court bar.

On 29 March 1997, he was appointed as Law Secretary at the Ministry of Justice and Law (MoJL)– a chief bureaucratic position inside the law and justice ministry. His appointment as the Law Secretary of Pakistan was nominated and confirmed by Prime Minister Nawaz Sharif immediately after being elected in general elections held in 1997. His appointment as a law secretary was noted as the first time in the history of the country that someone from the Bar had been appointed to such post.

On 22 May 1998, he was elevated as judge at the Lahore High Court after a nomination summary sent by Prime Minister Sharif, only to be confirmed as judge of Lahore High Court by then-President Rafiq Tarrar. As a judge in Lahore High Court, he heard and passed judgements on many important cases involving the resolution of disputes on the civil matters, commercial banking disputes, and tax evasions/avoidances.

In 2000, Nisar was among those judges at the Lahore High Court, who when given chance to either resign or accept military provisional constitutional order enacted by Military Dictator General Musharraf, took the oath under the new provisional constitutional order and was continue to allow hearing cases at the Lahore High Court.

=== Academia ===
Nisar is known for his educational interests in legal education, and is currently tenuring as visiting professor of law at the Law College of the Punjab University where he provides instructions on the constitutional law and civil law procedure. Nisar attended and represented Pakistan in the international conference on "India and Pakistan at Fifty" held in Wilton Park in United Kingdom; he also led judicial delegations on conferences held in the Philippines and Switzerland.

In 2009, Nisar authored a paper on Islam and democracy and presented the paper to the Norwegian Academy of Science and Letters in Oslo, Norway, and offered discussion on the "Role of the Courts in Islamic Democratic Society."

=== Supreme Court Justice ===
On 13 February 2010, his nomination to be elevated as the justice of the Supreme Court was initially rejected by the then-President Asif Ali Zardari in spite of recommendation made by Chief Justice Iftikhar Muhammad Chaudhry. President Zardari instead elevated Justice K.M. Sharif that ultimately supersedes senior-most Justice Nisar for the promotion, appointing the latter as acting Chief Justice of Lahore High Court.

Upon hearing these developments, Chief Justice Chaudhry suspended the appointment order and marked such actions as "unconstitutional", using his constitutional powers granted by the Judicial Commission.

On 19 February 2010, Nisar, was sworn as justice of the Supreme Court.

=== Notable cases ===
He was a member of the Supreme Court bench which heard the case against 21st Constitutional Amendment, the amendment which authorized the establishment of military courts to hear terrorism cases after the incident which killed 141 people including 132 children in a school in Peshawar on 16 December 2014.

He also heard the case where Pakistan Railways's land worth Rs10 billion was allotted to Royal Palm Golf Club by Musharraf government which federal government of Nawaz Sharif wanted back in 2014.

He headed the bench which heard the case of Jehangir Khan Tareen and Imran Khan.

== Criticism ==
=== Judicial activism and allegations of nexus with the military ===
Nisar has been criticized by some notable academics, journalists, and politicians for his judicial activism and over-involvement in the day-to-day affairs of the government. In this regard, he has also been described as "an arrogant and somewhat ‘imbalanced’ judge". Nisar is accused of being in alliance with Pakistan's military establishment against Pakistan Muslim League (N), Nawaz Sharif and his government which was ousted in July 2017.

Despite Election Commission of Pakistan ordering to provide security to all candidates contesting the General Elections 2018, he ordered removal of security from all non-government but high profile politicians, most of who had been part of the previous governments which included PML(N) and JUI politicians. Some of them had been under threat from terrorists including Tehreek-e-Taliban Pakistan and Lashkar-e-Jhangvi. This was seen by many political parties as political victimization. Their claim was further strengthened when a leader of ANP, Haroon Bilour, was killed by a Taliban suicide bomber on 10 July 2018 in Peshawar during the election campaign. Siraj Raisani and 148 others were killed in another suicide bombing in Mastung on 13 July 2018. The Islamic State of Iraq and the Levant (ISIL) claimed responsibility for the terrorist attack.

Legal offices
Preceded by Anwar Zaheer Jamali	25th Chief Justice of Pakistan; December 2016 – January 2019	Succeeded by Asif Saeed Khosa
