= Law Secretary of Pakistan =

Administrative post of the ministry of law and justice

- دبیر قانون پاکستان
- Incumbent; Raja Naeem Akbar
- Appointer: Prime Minister of Pakistan
- Website: Ministry of Law

The Law Secretary of Pakistan is the Federal Secretary for the Ministry of Law and Justice and the Chief Law officer of the Government of Pakistan. Traditionally, the position of Secretary has been filled by retired Judges of the Supreme Court, High Courts or by a seasoned lawyer, and not by career civil servants of Grade 22 like in other Federal Ministries. The current Law Secretary is Raja Naeem Akbar.

The Secretary, based in Islamabad, plays a vital role in the country's administration of justice. The Law Secretary is appointed by the Prime Minister of Pakistan and reports to the Federal Law Minister.

== See also ==
- Government of Pakistan
- Federal Secretary
- Aviation Secretary of Pakistan
- Cabinet Secretary of Pakistan
- Petroleum Secretary of Pakistan
