= Asif Saeed Khosa =

Pakistani judge (born 1954)

- آصف سعید کھوسہ

26th Chief Justice of Pakistan
- In office 18 January 2019 – 20 December 2019
- Appointed by: Arif Alvi
- Preceded by: Mian Saqib Nisar
- Succeeded by: Gulzar Ahmed

Senior Justice of the Supreme Court of Pakistan
- In office 31 December 2016 – 17 January 2019
- Preceded by: Mian Saqib Nisar
- Succeeded by: Gulzar Ahmed

Justice of the Supreme Court of Pakistan
- In office 18 February 2010 – 20 December 2019
- Appointed by: Asif Ali Zardari

Justice of the Lahore High Court
- In office 21 May 1998 – 17 February 2010

Advocate of the Supreme Court of Pakistan
- In office 12 September 1985 – 20 May 1998

Advocate of the Lahore High Court
- In office 13 November 1979 – Unknown date

Personal details
- Born: 21 December 1954 (age 71) Dera Ghazi Khan, Punjab, Pakistan
- Relations: Nasim Hasan Shah (father-in-law); Nasir Mahmood Khosa (brother); Tariq Masood Khosa (brother); Latif Khosa (cousin)
- Education: University of Cambridge (LL.M.); Lincoln's Inn (Bar at Law); University of Punjab (B.A., M.A.); Government College, Lahore (Inter)

Supreme Court of Pakistan

Asif Saeed Khan Khosa (Urdu: آصف سعید خان کھوسہ; born 21 December 1954) is a retired Pakistani judge who served as the 26th Chief Justice of Pakistan from 18 January 2019 to 20 December 2019. Khosa was appointed to the Supreme Court on 18 February 2010 and previously served as judge of the Lahore High Court.

During his tenure as a Supreme Court judge, he was part of the benches that disqualified two elected prime ministers, Yousuf Raza Gillani and Nawaz Sharif. During his tenure as Chief Justice, a bench Khosa headed nullified the Imran Khan government's decision to extend the tenure of Qamar Javed Bajwa as Chief of Army Staff (COAS) for another three-year term and directed the government to put the tenure into law within six months while giving a temporary extension of six months to Bajwa as COAS. This was the first time in the history of Pakistan that the extension or the tenure of an army chief was questioned by the Supreme Court. Under his supervision a special court in Islamabad sentenced a former military dictator Pervez Musharraf to death.

== Early life and family ==
Asif Saeed was born in 1954 in Dera Ghazi Khan, West Punjab, into a Punjabi Baloch Khosa family belonging. He passed his matriculation in 1969 from the Multan Board, securing fifth position. He was admitted to Government College Lahore for intermediate and secured first position in the Lahore Board. Then in 1973 he appeared for the B.A exams from Government College Lahore at the University of the Punjab and secured the first position.

During his education at the Punjab University, he was inspired by the thoughts of Syed Abul A'ala Maududi and Maulana Naeem Siddiqui. He secured a National Scholarship Award. He did his master's degree in English Language and Literature at the University of the Punjab in 1975. He was then admitted to Queens' College, Cambridge and did his Master of Laws with specialization in Public International Law. Later he was called to the Bar on 26 July 1979 at the Lincoln's Inn, London.

Khosa is the son-in-law of former Chief Justice of Pakistan Nasim Hasan Shah and brother of retired federal secretary, Nasir Mahmood Khosa. He is a cousin of Latif Khosa, a former Governor of Punjab and former Attorney General for Pakistan.

== Legal career ==
Before becoming a judge, he was an advocate of the Supreme Court Bar Association of Pakistan and the Lahore High Court Bar Association. He was called to the Bar at the Honourable Society of Lincoln's Inn, London, Great Britain on 26 July 1979.

Khosa was elevated to the Bench and appointed as a Lahore High Court judge in May 1998. When General Pervez Musharraf declared a state of emergency in November 2007, suspending the constitution and demanding the judges of the superior judiciary retake their oath under the Provisional Constitutional Order (PCO), Justice Khosa like then-Chief Justice Iftikhar Muhammad Chaudhry, and many other senior judges, refused to take a fresh oath. They were suspended from their duties. On 18 August 2008, he was restored as a High Court judge as a result of a lawyer's movement to restore the "deposed judges". He was among the larger bench of seven Supreme Court justices that heard Prime Minister Yousaf Raza Gillani's contempt of court case. In that case Supreme Court gave its judgement that had an additional attachment of Justice Khosa's six-page note, quoting Kahlil Gibran's "Pity the Nation". He also headed the larger bench of the Supreme Court that was hearing the "Panama Case" related to the alleged money laundering and off-shore illegal investment by former Prime Minister Nawaz Sharif and his family. Remarking on articles 62 and 63 of the constitution in the "Panama Case" hearing he said:

This case is the first of its kind… we know the gravity of a declaration by the court and its affect for both the parties, saying that someone was not honest. But we have to lay down parameters, otherwise, except for the Jamaat-i-Islami chief Sirajul Haq, no one will survive.

As articles 62 and 63 are related to truthfulness and honesty of parliamentarians, it became a matter of controversy in the media, because Justice Khosa was pointing out that there is no truthful and honest parliamentarian except Siraj-ul-Haq. Khosa had to withdraw his remarks, after stating that he regreted making them. Justice Khosa is being considered the most relentless judge in larger bench of the "Panama Case". The final verdict issued by the larger bench on the "Panama Case" against Prime Minister Nawaz Sharif and his family has proposed a JIT within 60 days. In the final verdict Justice Khosa and Justice Gulzar in their remarks disqualified Prime Minister Nawaz Sharif from running for office. Their statement says:

The Election Commission of Pakistan is directed to issue a notification of disqualification of respondent No. 1 namely Mian Muhammad Nawaz Sharif from being a member of the Majlis-e-Shoora (Parliament) with effect from the date of announcement of the present judgment.

On 2 January 2019, President Arif Alvi approved Khosa's appointment as the next Chief Justice of Pakistan.

== Books ==
Khosa has authored books which explore constitutional interpretation, judicial reasoning, and the evolution of legal precedent in Pakistan, including:

- Judging with Passion: A compilation of his notable judgments, illustrating his legal reasoning and reflections on justice.
- Heeding the Constitution: A collection of essays, articles, and lectures discussing constitutional interpretation, rule of law, and legal theory in Pakistan.
- Breaking New Ground & Settling Conflicting Judicial Opinions: An analytical work that addresses inconsistencies in Pakistani case law and explores how judicial precedents evolve.

Legal offices
Preceded by Mian Saqib Nisar	26th Chief Justice of Pakistan; January 2019 – December 2019	Succeeded by Gulzar Ahmed
