= Chief Justice of Pakistan =

Presiding judge of the Supreme Court of Pakistan

Chief Justice of Pakistan of To, The Honorable Chief Justice of Pakistan Islamabad, Pakistan Subject: An Appeal for the Fundamental Human Rights, Health, and Fair Justice for Former Prime Minister Imran Khan Respected Chief Justice, With utmost respect, I wish to bring your attention to an important humanitarian and legal matter. Honorable Sir, Imran Khan is a former Prime Minister of Pakistan and a political leader who was elected by the people of this country through their votes. We trusted him, considered him our leader, and gave him the responsibility of leading our nation. Today, he is imprisoned and facing sentences in various legal cases. As citizens of Pakistan, we have serious concerns about whether he is being provided with all his legal rights, transparent judicial proceedings, and fair treatment under the law. Considering his age, health, and the difficulties he has faced during his imprisonment, we sincerely request that he be treated with humanity, dignity, and in accordance with the law. Justice is not merely about punishment. True justice means ensuring that every individual has the full right to defend themselves, receive a fair trial, and have their fundamental human rights protected. We are not asking for any unlawful favour or special treatment. We are simply asking for the rule of law, transparent justice, protection of human rights, and equal treatment under the Constitution of Pakistan. Honorable Chief Justice, I respectfully appeal to you to ensure that Imran Khan's health, medical treatment, prison conditions, and legal rights are reviewed in accordance with the law. Please take all necessary legal steps to ensure that he receives fair treatment and that all principles of justice are upheld. Remember, political positions change, governments come and go, but the dignity and credibility of our justice system must always remain strong. We do not demand special justice for anyone. We demand equal justice for everyone. Yours respectfully, A Concerned Citizen of Pakistan A citizen who believes in justice, the rule of law, and the protection of fundamental human rights.
- منصفِ اعظم پاکستان; Munsif-e-Āzam Pākistān قاضیُ الْقُضاۃ
- Emblem of the SCP
- Incumbent; Yahya Afridi since 26 October 2024
- Supreme Court of Pakistan
- Style: The Honorable (formal); Your Lordship (within court); Mr. Chief Justice (informal)
- Status: Chief justice
- Seat: Supreme Court Building, Red Zone, Islamabad
- Nominator: Prime Minister of Pakistan on recommendations of Special Parliamentary Committee.
- Appointer: President of Pakistan
- Term length: 3 Years or (until the age of 65) whichever is earlier
- Constituting instrument: Constitution of Pakistan
- Formation: 27 June 1949 (77 years ago)
- First holder: Abdul Rashid (as Federal Chief Justice)
- Website: www.supremecourt.gov.pk

Supreme Court of Pakistan

The chief justice of Pakistan (initials as CJP; Urdu: منصفِ اعظم پاکستان, Munsif-e-Āzam Pākistān) is the chief judge of the Supreme Court of Pakistan and is the highest-ranking officer of the Pakistani judiciary.

The Federal Court of Pakistan was established by Governor-General Muhammad Ali Jinnah's Order in February 1948. Until 1956, the chief justice and senior justices were known by the title of 'Federal Judge', and the Federal Court of Pakistan operated out of a wing of the Lahore High Court, despite the federal capital's location in Karachi. The enactment of Pakistan's first constitution in March 1956 redesigned it as the 'Supreme Court of Pakistan.'

The chief justice is the chief administrative officer of the country's court system and the highest judicial officer, ranking immediately above the chief justice of the Federal Shariat Court. He is responsible for supervising federal judicial policies, and conducting judicial business in the Supreme Court.

Nomination for the appointment of the chief justice is made by the prime minister of Pakistan, and final appointments are confirmed by the president of Pakistan. Chief Justice of Pakistan is recommended by Special Parliamentary Committee consisting of 8 members of National Assembly and 4 members of Senate. He is selected by amongst 3 senior most justices of Supreme Court by two-third majority of total membership of Committee. Committee sends nomination of selected justice to Prime Minister and Prime Minister advises President of Pakistan to appoint that justice as Chief Justice of Supreme Court of Pakistan.

Before 26th Amendment to the Constitution 2024. Senior most judge of Supreme Court was appointed as Chief Justice by President on advice of Prime Minister.

Presiding over the oral arguments before the court, the chief justice has significant agenda-setting power over meetings of the Supreme Court. In modern tradition, the chief justice has the ceremonial duty of administering the oath of office of the president of Pakistan.

The first chief justice was Sir Abdul Rashid. The current chief justice is Yahya Afridi, incumbent since 26 October 2024.

== List of chief justices ==
#	Name	Period of office		Length of term (years, days)	Bar	Appointed by
1	Sir Mian Abdul Rashid	27 June 1949	29 June 1954	5 years, 0 days	Lahore High Court	Government of India Act 1935
2	Muhammad Munir	29 June 1954	2 May 1960	5 years, 308 days	Lahore High Court	Malik Ghulam Muhammad
3	Muhammad Shahabuddin^{†}	3 May 1960	12 May 1960	9 days	Madras High Court	Ayub Khan
4	A.R. Cornelius	13 May 1960	29 February 1968	7 years, 292 days	Lahore High Court	Ayub Khan
5	S.A. Rahman	1 March 1968	3 June 1968	94 days	Lahore High Court	Ayub Khan
6	Fazal Akbar	4 June 1968	17 November 1968	166 days	East Pakistan High Court	Ayub Khan
7	Hamoodur Rahman^{†}	18 November 1968	31 October 1975	6 years, 347 days	Calcutta High Court	Ayub Khan
8	Yaqub Ali	1 November 1975	22 September 1977	1 year, 325 days	Lahore High Court	Fazal Ilahi Chaudhry
9	Sheikh Anwarul Haq	23 September 1977	25 March 1981	3 years, 183 days	Lahore High Court	Fazal Ilahi Chaudhry
10	Mohammad Haleem	23 March 1981	31 December 1989	8 years, 283 days	Sindh High Court	Zia-ul-Haq
11	Afzal Zullah	1 January 1990	18 April 1993	3 years, 107 days	Lahore High Court	Ghulam Ishaq Khan
12	Nasim Hasan Shah	17 April 1993	14 April 1994	362 days	Lahore High Court	Ghulam Ishaq Khan
13	Syed Sajjad Ali Shah	5 June 1994	2 December 1997	3 years, 180 days	Sindh High Court	Farooq Leghari
14	Ajmal Mian	27 December 1997	30 June 1999	1 year, 185 days	Sindh High Court	Wasim Sajjad
15	Saeeduzzaman Siddiqui	1 July 1999	26 January 2000	209 days	Sindh High Court	Rafiq Tarar
16	Irshad Hasan Khan	26 January 2000	6 January 2002	1 year, 345 days	Lahore High Court	Rafiq Tarar
17	Bashir Jehangiri	7 January 2002	31 January 2002	24 days	Peshawar High Court	Pervez Musharraf
18	Sheikh Riaz Ahmad	1 February 2002	31 December 2003	1 year, 333 days	Lahore High Court	Pervez Musharraf
19	Nazim Hussain Siddiqui	31 December 2003	29 June 2005	1 year, 180 days	Sindh High Court	Pervez Musharraf
20	Iftikhar Muhammad Chaudhry (1st)	29 June 2005	9 March 2007	1 year, 253 days	Balochistan High Court	Pervez Musharraf
21	Javaid Iqbal	9 March 2007	24 March 2007	15 days	Balochistan High Court	Pervez Musharraf
22	Rana Bhagwandas	25 March 2007	20 July 2007	87 days	Sindh High Court	Pervez Musharraf
23	Iftikhar Muhammad Chaudhry (2nd)	20 July 2007	3 November 2007	136 days	Balochistan High Court	Pervez Musharraf
24	A. H. Dogar	3 November 2007	21 March 2009	1 year, 138 days	Sindh High Court	Pervez Musharraf
25	Iftikhar Muhammad Chaudhry (3rd)	21 March 2009	11 December 2013	4 years, 265 days	Balochistan High Court	Asif Ali Zardari
26	Tassaduq Hussain Jillani	12 December 2013	6 July 2014	176 days	Lahore High Court	Mamnoon Hussain
27	Nasir-ul-Mulk	7 July 2014	16 August 2015	1 year, 70 days	Peshawar High Court	Mamnoon Hussain
28	Jawwad S. Khawaja	17 August 2015	9 September 2015	23 days	Lahore High Court	Mamnoon Hussain
29	Anwar Zaheer Jamali	10 September 2015	30 December 2016	1 year, 111 days	Sindh High Court	Mamnoon Hussain
30	Mian Saqib Nisar	31 December 2016	17 January 2019	2 years, 17 days	Lahore High Court	Mamnoon Hussain
31	Asif Saeed Khan Khosa	18 January 2019	20 December 2019	336 days	Lahore High Court	Arif Alvi
32	Gulzar Ahmed	21 December 2019	1 February 2022	2 years, 42 days	Sindh High Court	Arif Alvi
33	Umar Ata Bandial	2 February 2022	16 September 2023	1 year, 226 days	Lahore High Court	Arif Alvi
34	Qazi Faez Isa	17 September 2023	25 October 2024	1 year, 38 days	Balochistan High Court	Arif Alvi
35	Yahya Afridi	26 October 2024	Incumbent	2 years, 22 days	Peshawar High Court	Asif Ali Zardari

- A Acting
- ± Recess appointment, later rejected by the Supreme Judicial Council. All decisions voided due to illegality of appointment.
- † Died in office

== See also ==
- Supreme Court of Pakistan
- Pakistan Bar Council
- Punjab Bar Council
- Supreme Court Bar Association of Pakistan
- Constitution of Pakistan
