= Mamnoon Hussain =

President of Pakistan from 2013 to 2018

- ممنون حسین
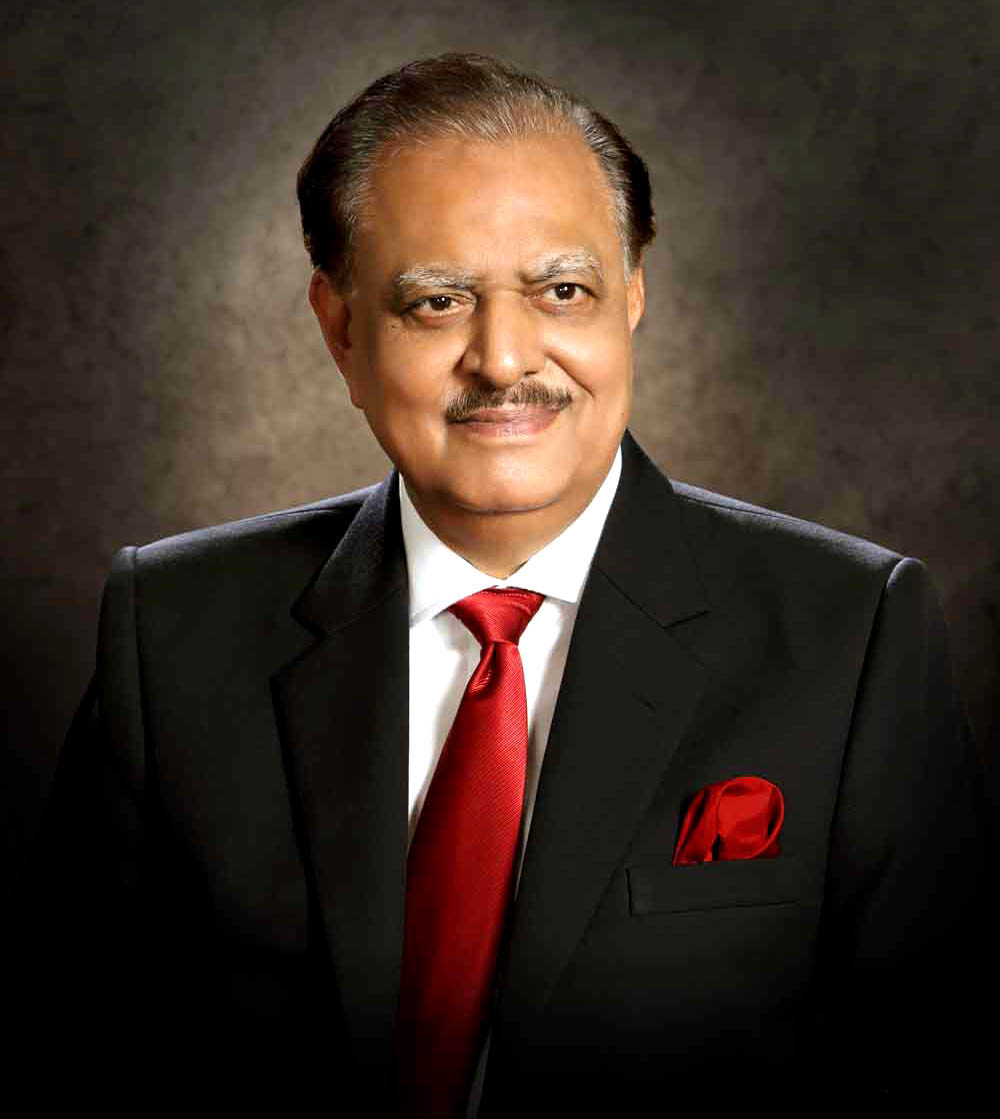
- Official portrait, 2013

12th President of Pakistan
- In office 9 September 2013 – 9 September 2018
- Prime Minister: Nawaz Sharif; Shahid Khaqan Abbasi; Nasirul Mulk (caretaker); Imran Khan
- Preceded by: Asif Ali Zardari
- Succeeded by: Arif Alvi

24th Governor of Sindh
- In office 19 June 1999 – 12 October 1999
- President: Rafiq Tarar
- Prime Minister: Nawaz Sharif
- Preceded by: Moinuddin Haider
- Succeeded by: AM Azim Daudpota

Personal details
- Born: 23 December 1940 Agra, United Provinces, British India
- Died: 14 July 2021 (aged 80) Karachi, Sindh, Pakistan
- Party: PMLN (1993–2021)
- Spouse: Mehmooda Mamnoon
- Education: Institute of Business Administration, Karachi
- Occupation: Politician; Industrialist

Mamnoon Hussain (Note: Urdu: ممنون حسین) (23 December 1940 – 14 July 2021) was a Pakistani politician, industrialist and statesman who served as the 12th president of Pakistan from 2013 to 2018. He also served as the governor of Sindh from June 1999 until being deposed in a coup d'état in October 1999, when the federal and all provincial governments were overthrown by Pervez Musharraf.

Hussain was then nominated for the presidency by the PML(N) in July 2013 and was elected through an indirect presidential election. Hussain took over the presidency after an oath administered by the Chief Justice of Pakistan on 9 September 2013.

Hussain maintained a low-key profile as president and his role was rarely seen in the nation's politics, although he was involved in a Polio eradication program.

== Personal life ==
Mamnoon Hussain was born in Agra, British India in 1940 to Ustad Zafar Hussain. His family's ancestral occupation was in the trade of leather and footwear. They moved to Karachi in 1949. After being homeschooled, Hussain enrolled in the Karachi University where he studied for the Commerce degree. After graduating from the Karachi University in 1963, he entered in the master's program at the Institute of Business Administration (IBA) in Karachi, and obtained his MBA degree in 1965.

Initially supporting and strengthening his father's business, he later founded his own textile company in Karachi. He later joined the center-right Pakistan Muslim League in 1970, working as a party worker. In 1997, he earned public notability as a business leader when he was elected as president of the Karachi Chamber of Commerce & Industry, serving until May 1999.

== Political career ==
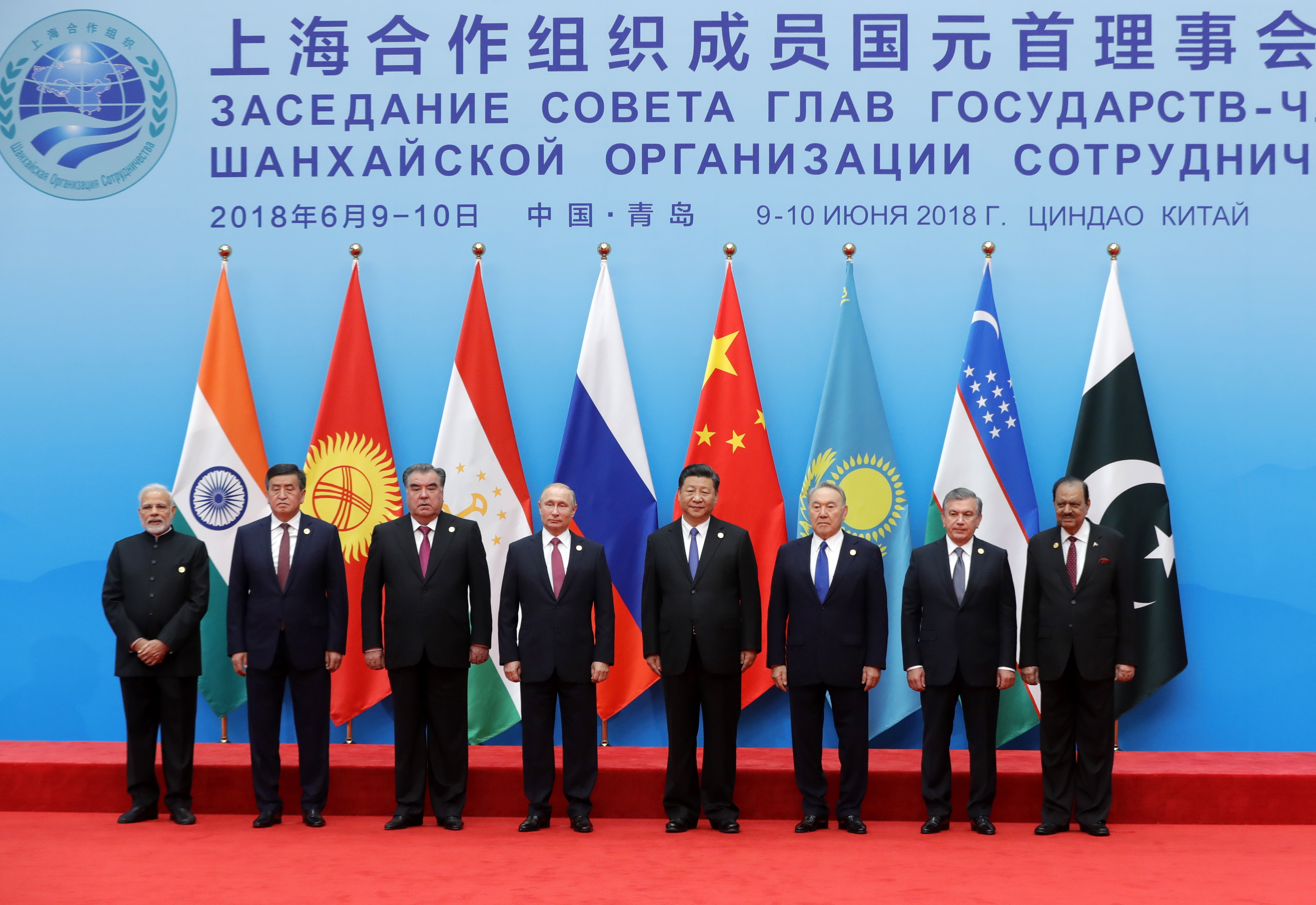
Hussain at the 2018 Shanghai Cooperation Organisation (SCO) summit in China

Hussain began to take interest in national politics in 1968 when he became chairman and joined the Pakistan Muslim League (PML) led by Nurul Amin. Initially, an activist with reformist zeal in 1968, Hussain became joint secretary of the Pakistan Muslim League's Karachi chapter. In 1993, he officially joined the PML(N) led by Nawaz Sharif and was appointed the Finance Secretary of the PML(N) in Sindh.

An advisor to Sindh Chief Minister Liaquat Ali Jatoi between 1997 and 1998,In June 1999, he became the Governor of Sindh, but his term was cut short on 12 October 1999 when the PML(N) government was ousted in a military coup. which led to the suspension of the Constitution. While the military sought to isolate Nawaz Sharif, Mamnoon Hussain remained loyal to him. His credentials as a politician devoted to the cause of democracy were established when he became a political prisoner after raising his voice against the military regime of Pervez Musharraf.

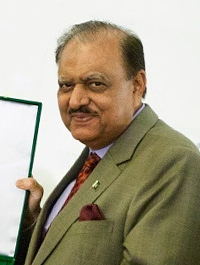
Hussain in 2014

He ran for the National Assembly of Pakistan in the 2002 Pakistani general election from NA-250 Karachi-XII as a candidate of the PML(N), but was unsuccessful. He received 5,565 votes and was defeated by Abdul Sattar Afghani, a candidate of the Muttahida Majlis-e-Amal (MMA).

Azhar Haroon, the former president of the Karachi Chamber of Commerce and Industry, said: "He had no political affiliation until 1999 but his polite discourse and professional ability impressed Nawaz Sharif, who appointed him as the Governor of Sindh". He was a relatively lesser-known figure, described as loyal to Nawaz Sharif, and was elected President of Pakistan as the official nominee of the PML-N in the July 2013 presidential election. Hussain secured 432 votes and his only rival Wajihuddin Ahmed received 77. He was sworn in on 9 September 2013 in a ceremony held at Aiwan-e-Sadr, attended by mainstream political and military leadership alongside foreign dignitaries, media personnel and his close relatives. At the time of assuming the office of president, he became the second oldest president of Pakistan. His term for the presidency ended on 8 September 2018. He was the second president of Pakistan whose family migrated to Pakistan from India after the Partition of India. He belonged to an ethnic Muhajir family.

== Death ==
In February 2020, Hussain was diagnosed with cancer and was under treatment. On 14 July 2021, he died at a private hospital in Karachi, at the age of 80.

== See also ==
- Federal Secretary
- List of presidents of Pakistan
- Constitution of Pakistan

== Notes ==
Political offices
Preceded by Moinuddin Haider	Governor of Sindh; 1999	Succeeded by Azim Daudpota
Preceded by Asif Ali Zardari	President of Pakistan; 2013–2018	Succeeded by Arif Alvi
