= Judiciary of Pakistan =

National judicial system

- Motto: فاحكم بين الناس بالحق "So judge between the people in truth" (Quran 38:26)

Service overview
- Formerly known as: Federal Judiciary
- Founded: 14 August 1947
- Country: Pakistan
- Controlling authority: Supreme Court; Federal Constitutional Court; High Court; Federal Shariat Court
- Legal personality: Judiciary
- Duties: Justice Administration; Public Interest Litigation; Guardian of the Constitution
- Hierarchy of Courts in Pakistan: 1. Supreme Court and Federal Constitutional Court; 2. High Court and Federal Shariat Court; 3. District Court
- Post Designation: Justice; Judge; Magistrate - Judicial & Executive
- Selection / Appointment: 1. Judicial Commission of Pakistan for the Supreme, Federal Constitutional, and High court judges 2. Governor for Subordinate Judiciary (after passing the service exam)

Head of Judiciary
- Chief Justice of Pakistan: Justice Yahya Afridi

The judiciary of Pakistan is the national system of courts that maintains the law and order in the Islamic Republic of Pakistan. Pakistan uses a common law system, which was introduced during the colonial era, influenced by local medieval judicial systems based on religious and cultural practices. The Constitution of Pakistan lays down the fundamentals and working of the Pakistani judiciary.

Pakistan has two classes of courts: the superior (or higher) judiciary and the subordinate (or lower) judiciary. The superior judiciary is composed of the Supreme Court of Pakistan, the Federal Shariat Court, Federal Constitutional Court and five High Courts, with the Supreme Court at the apex. There is a High Court for each of the four provinces as well as the federal capital. The Constitution of Pakistan entrusts the superior judiciary with the obligation to preserve, protect and defend the constitution. The autonomous and disputed territories of Gilgit-Baltistan and Azad Kashmir have judicial systems that are distinct from the main Pakistani system.

The state of the independence of the Pakistani judiciary has changed over time. Whereas the judiciary used to defer to the Pakistani military, which is a dominant actor in Pakistan's politics, the judiciary has increasingly competed with and confronted the military.

The subordinate judiciary consists of civil and criminal district courts, and numerous specialized courts covering banking, insurance, customs and excise, smuggling, drugs, terrorism, taxation, the environment, consumer protection, and corruption. The criminal courts were created under the Criminal Procedure Code 1898, during the British Raj, and the civil courts were established by the West Pakistan Civil Court Ordinance 1962. There are also revenue courts that operate under the West Pakistan Land Revenue Act 1967. The government may also set up administrative courts and tribunals for exercising exclusive jurisdiction in specific matters.

As of 2017, Pakistan's judiciary is suffering from a backlog of two million cases, with lawsuits taking an average of nearly ten years to resolve. According to some estimates, 90 percent of civil cases involve land disputes, owing to Pakistan's lack of a proper land register.

== Superior judiciary ==
=== Supreme Court of Pakistan ===
The Supreme Court, established in 1956, is the apex court in Pakistan's judicial hierarchy, the final arbiter of legal and constitutional disputes. The court consists of a Chief Justice and sixteen other judges. There is also provision for appointment of acting judges as well as ad hoc judges in the court. It has a permanent seat in Islamabad as well as branch registries in Lahore, Peshawar, Quetta and Karachi.

It has a number of de jure powers which are outlined in the constitution, including appellate and constitutional jurisdiction, and suo moto power to try human rights matters. Through several periods of military rule and constitutional suspensions, the court has also established itself as a de facto check on military power. The Supreme Court Judges are supervised by the Supreme Judicial Council.

After the appointment of Justice Qazi Faez Isa, there has come a significant change in the working of the apex court of the land. In an unprecedented act, the judicial proceedings are now televised in order to show the country how the superior court of the land works. Additionally, following the amendments by the Parliament, the suo moto powers of the Chief Justice have been curtailed as now in order for a suo moto case to be initiated, the 3 senior most judges must be in agreement that the matter is indeed of public importance and the court must act upon its powers and take up the case.

=== Federal Shariat Court of Pakistan ===
The Federal Shariat Court of Pakistan is a constitutional Islamic religious court, established in 1980 to scrutinise all Pakistani laws and determine if they conform to Islamic values "as laid down in the Quran and the Sunnah". If a law is found to be 'repugnant', the Court notifies the relevant government, specifying the reasons for its decision. The court also has appellate jurisdiction over penalties (hudud) arising out of Islamic law, although these decisions can be reviewed by the Shariat Appellate Bench of the Supreme Court. The decisions of the court are binding on the high courts as well as the subordinate judiciary. The court appoints its own staff and frames its own rules of procedure.

The court consists of eight Muslim judges, appointed by the President of Pakistan, on the advice of a judicial committee of the chief justices of the Supreme Court and the Federal Shariat Court. The committee chooses from amongst serving or retired judges of the Supreme Court or the high courts or from amongst persons possessing the qualifications of judges of a high court. Of the eight judges, three are required to be Islamic scholars/Ulema qualified in Islamic law. The judges serve terms of three years, subject to extension by the President. The current Chief Justice of the Federal Shariat Court is Justice Iqbal Hameed Ur Rehman.

=== Federal Constitutional Court of Pakistan ===
The Federal Constitutional Court is the constitutional court of the Islamic Republic of Pakistan at the federal level. It was established through the twenty-seventh amendment in the Constitution of Pakistan, passed by the Parliament of Pakistan in November 2025.

The court exercises exclusive jurisdiction in constitutional interpretation and disputes between the federal and provincial governments. Its creation transferred many of the constitutional functions previously exercised by the Supreme Court of Pakistan to a separate specialised body.

The FCC has exclusive authority to adjudicate disputes between the federal government and any provincial government or among provinces, to interpret provisions of the Constitution of Pakistan and decide questions of constitutional law, to hear appeals involving substantial questions of constitutional interpretation arising from the High Courts, to exercise jurisdiction in cases involving enforcement of fundamental rights and any cases pending before other courts that fall within the FCCP's jurisdiction automatically stand transferred to it. The FCCP's decisions on constitutional interpretation are binding on all other courts, including the Supreme Court of Pakistan.

=== High courts ===
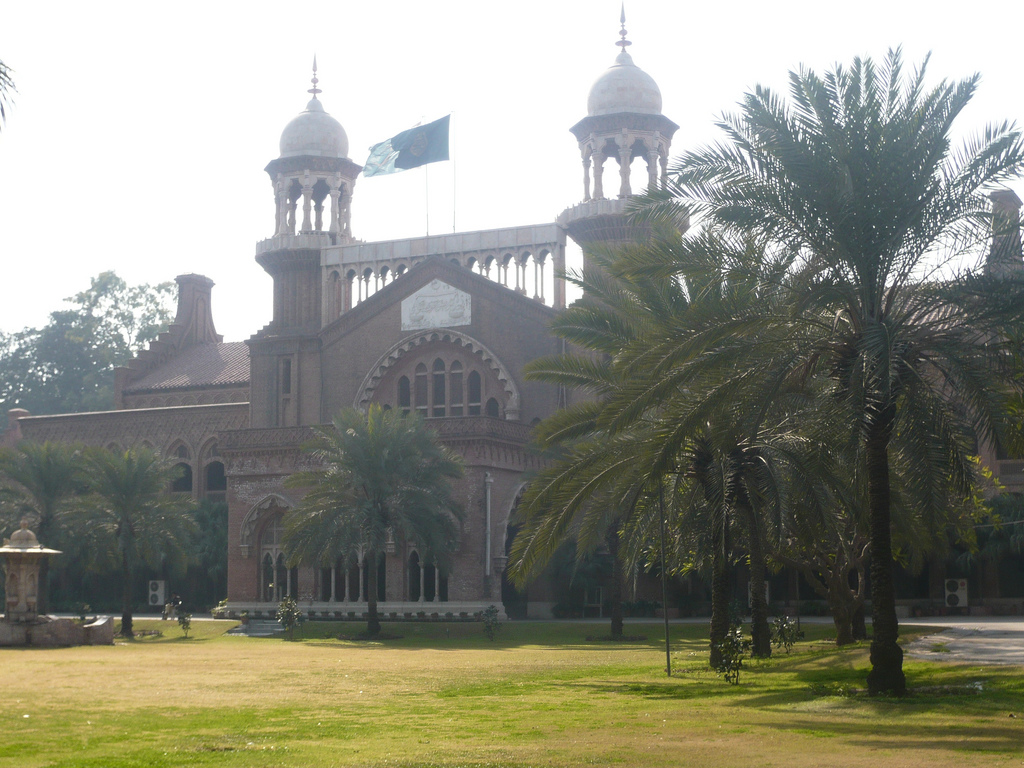
Lahore High Court

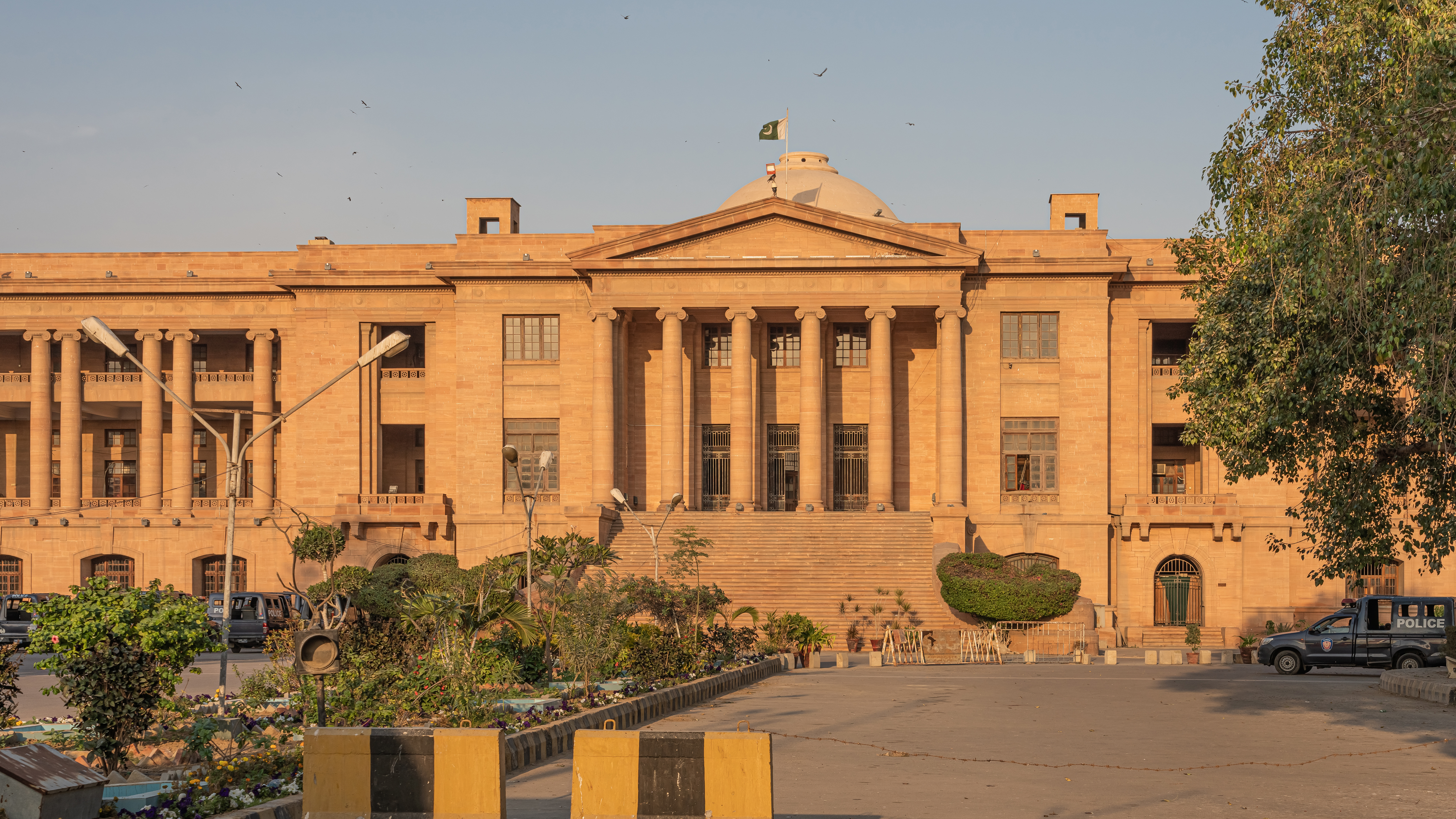
Sindh High Court

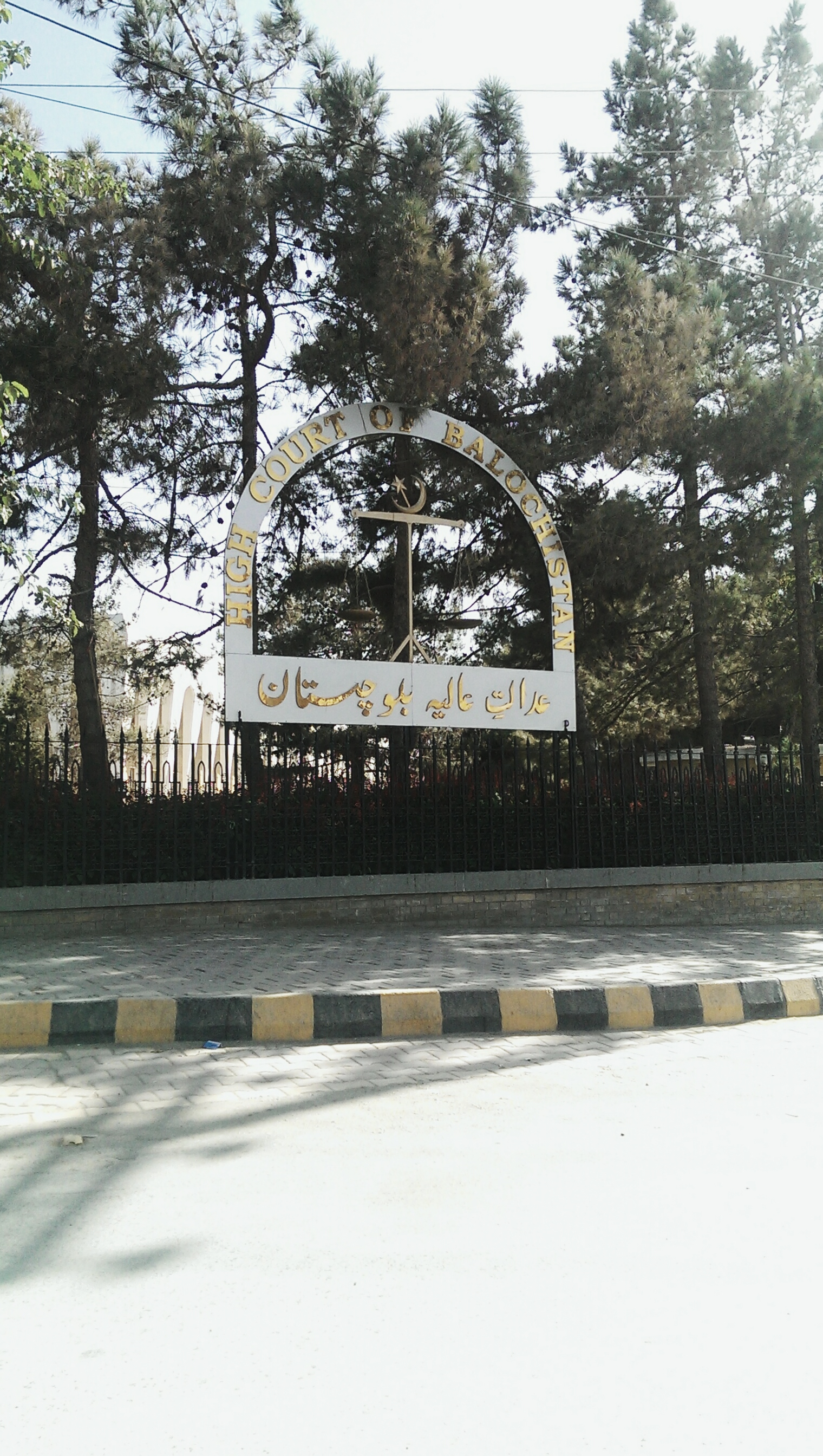
A Corner View of the Balochistan High Court Building, Quetta, Pakistan

There is a high court for the Islamabad Capital Territory and four provincial high courts. A high court is the principal court of its province.

- The Lahore High Court in Lahore, Punjab, with circuit benches at Bahawalpur, Multan and Rawalpindi.
- The Sindh High Court in Karachi, Sindh, with circuit benches at Hyderabad, Larkana, Mirpurkhas and Sukkur.
- The Peshawar High Court in Peshawar, Khyber Pakhtunkhwa, with circuit benches at Abbottabad, Bannu, Dera Ismail Khan, Mingora and Swat.
- The Balochistan High Court in Quetta, Baluchistan, with circuit benches in Sibi and Turbat.
- The Islamabad High Court in Islamabad, ICT

== Judiciary in autonomous territories ==
=== Supreme Court of Azad Jammu and Kashmir ===
The highest court of appeals in Azad Jammu and Kashmir is the Supreme Court of Azad Jammu and Kashmir. There is a Chief Justice and two additional judges on the court.

=== Supreme Appellate Court Gilgit-Baltistan ===
The highest court of appeals in Pakistan's Gilgit Baltistan area is the Supreme Appellate Court Gilgit-Baltistan. There is a Chief Justice and two additional judges on the court.

=== High courts ===
- High Court of Azad Jammu and Kashmir
- Gilgit-Baltistan Chief Court

== Subordinate judiciary ==
=== District judiciary ===
District judiciary or district courts exist in every district of each province, and have civil and criminal jurisdiction ordinarily governed by Civil Procedure Code, 1908 for civil cases and by Code of Criminal Procedure in criminal cases. The administrative head of district judiciary is the 'district and sessions judge'. In each district headquarters, there are a number of courts of additional district and sessions judges having same judicial powers like the court of district and sessions judge, including trial for offences shown in schedule II of Code of Criminal Procedure as exclusively triable by the Court of Session i.e. Qatl e Amd (culpable homicide), rape, defamation dacoity etc. These courts have also jurisdiction to try cases under the Hudood Laws of Pakistan, certain offences under Control of Narcotic Substances Act etc. These courts also work as ex officio Justice of Peace to entertain complaints against police officials. In civil jurisdiction these courts entertain the matters under Succession Act, Insolvency Act, suits for government, summary suits pertaining to negotiable instruments etc. These Courts are also civil appellate and criminal appellate courts. Civil and Family Appeals and Civil Revisions against the Judgements and orders of courts of senior civil judges, civil judges, rent controllers, and family courts are entertained by the court of district judge which transfers the same to additional district judges as well. All convictions awarded by judicial magistrates and convictions up to four years awarded by courts of assistant sessions judges or magistrates especially empowered under section 30 Cr.P.C. are appealable to a court of sessions judge which also transfer the criminal Appeals and criminal revisions to Additional Sessions Judges.

- The high court of each province has appellate jurisdiction over the lower courts.
- The Supreme Court has exclusive jurisdiction over disputes between and among provincial governments, and appellate jurisdiction over high court decisions.

Court usually starts early in the morning, with the hearing of pre-arrest bail applications, followed by post-arrest bail applications and civil appeals from the orders of the judicial magistrates' courts and civil judges. Decisions are usually announced later in the day, once the judge has had time to peruse the case files after the hearings. The rest of the day is allocated for the recording of the evidence in sessions cases such as in offences murder, rape and robbery etc. Cases are usually allotted by administrative orders of district and sessions judges. The court of the district and sessions judge usually hears administrative applications against lower courts orders.

=== Civil judge judicial magistrates' courts ===
In every town and city, there are numerous civil and judicial magistrates' courts. Normally in capacity of judicial magistrate these courts have the powers to try all offences other than those which are specifically triable by Court of Session but maximum limit for awarding sentence of improvement is not more than three years. However a judicial magistrate having special powers under section 30 of Code of Criminal Procedure can award all punishments except capital punishment. In civil capacity in the province of Sindh and Balochistan as a civil judge these courts have jurisdiction to entertain the claims of third-class suits having a pecuniary limit up to fifty thousand rupees. In other provinces civil judges have jurisdiction to entertain first- and second-class suits. Judicial magistrates possesses territorial jurisdiction police station wise as per notification issued by the Court of Session Judge. In magisterial functions judicial magistrates record statements on oath of witness, Judicial confession of accused, holds identification test parades, inquest proceedings of the prisoners. This court takes first cognizance of all offences of local laws, disposes of unclaimed properties or the movable properties suspected to be stolen.

In July 2025, President Asif Ali Zardari appointed new chief justices to all four provincial high courts, based on recommendations from the Judicial Commission of Pakistan (JCP). The appointees include Justice Sarfraz Dogar (Islamabad High Court), Justice Rozi Khan Barrech (Balochistan), Justice Syed Muhammad Attique Shah (Peshawar), and Justice Junaid Ghaffar (Sindh).

The JCP, after four consecutive meetings, endorsed the elevation of the acting chief justices, a move some observers see as reinforcing status quo preferences rather than promoting judicial reform or transparency. The appointments were formalized by the law ministry under Article 193(1) of the Constitution.

While constitutionally valid, the process has prompted quiet scrutiny over the influence of executive preferences in key judicial postings, raising ongoing concerns about judicial independence and institutional credibility in Pakistan’s legal framework.

=== Special tribunals and boards ===
There are numerous special tribunals such as;

- Banking courts
- Criminal courts
- Custom courts
- Drug courts
- Federal Services Tribunal
- Provincial services tribunals (one for each province)
- Income tax tribunals
- Accountability courts
- Anti-terrorism courts
- Labour courts
- Labour Appellate Tribunal
- Environmental courts
- Board of Revenue
- Special magistrate courts
- Control of Narcotic Substances (special courts)
- Consumer courts -
- Intellectual Property Tribunal
- Foreign Exchange Appellate Board

Almost all judges of above-mentioned courts and tribunals except for consumer courts are district and sessions judges or of having same qualifications. Besides, there exist revenue courts, operating under the West Pakistan Land Revenue Act 1967. The revenue courts may be classified as the Board of Revenue, the Commissioner, the Collector, the Assistant Collector of the First Grade and Second Grade. The provincial government that exercise administrative control over them appoints such officers. Law prescribes their powers and functions.

=== Family courts ===
The West Pakistan Family Courts Act 1964 governs the jurisdiction of Family Courts. As per schedule in the Act of 1964 family courts entertains the disputes of dissolution of marriage, recovery of maintenance of wives and minors, dower, dowery articles, guardian and wards disputes i.e. custody of minors, recovery of bridal gifts etc. All final decisions are appealable before the court of district judge while interim orders are not appealable but are challenged before high court through the constitutional jurisdiction.

=== Juvenile courts ===
The parliament has passed the Juvenile Justice System Act 2018. The law is applicable to the whole of Pakistan. It has repealed the Juvenile Justice System Ordinance 2000.

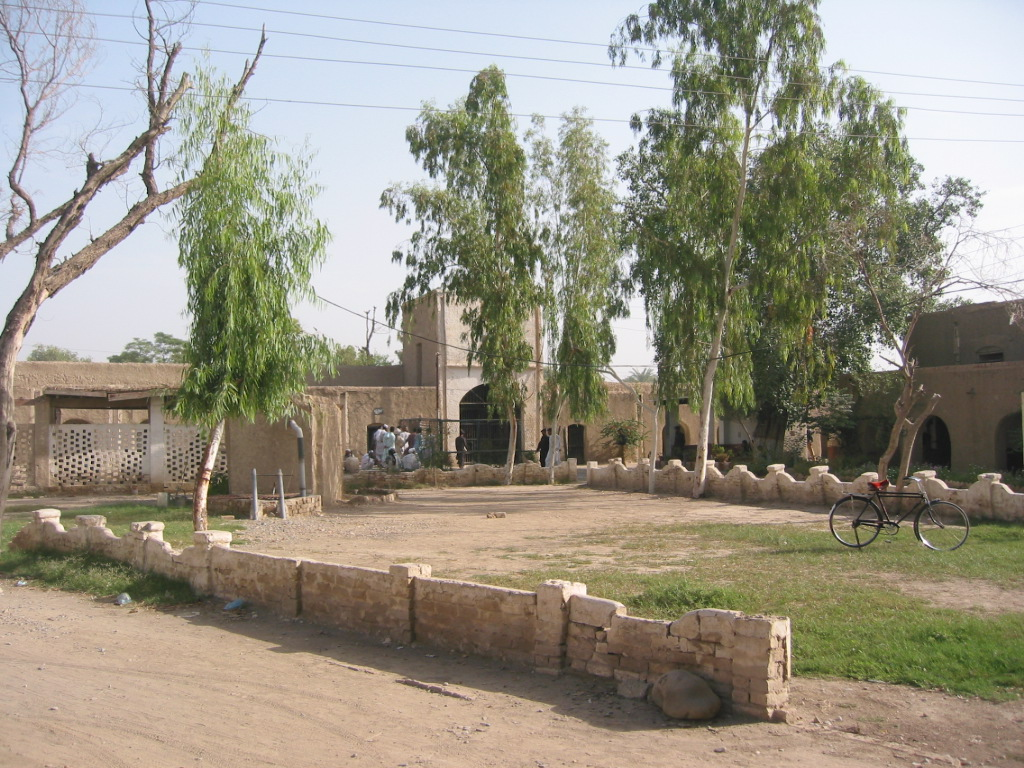

Section 4 of the JJSO authorizes the Provincial Government to establish one or more juvenile courts for any local area within its jurisdiction, in consultation with the chief justice of the high court.

Jurisdiction of juvenile courts was conferred to sessions judges and judicial magistrates in accordance with their original jurisdiction under Code of Criminal Procedure. Juvenile Justice System Act provides that every person below the age of 18 years is juvenile. The conclusive proof of age is Occification Test. The law warrants separate Camera trial of the juvenile providing all privileges to the juvenile accused as per the Act of 2018.

== Judicial academies ==
Judicial academies provide training for judges and judicial officials from within the country and other countries.

	Name	Territory
1	Federal Judicial Academy	Islamabad
2	Punjab Judicial Academy	Punjab
3	Balochistan Judicial Academy	Balochistan
4	Khyber Pakhtunkhwa Judicial Academy	Khyber Pakhtunkhwa
5	Sindh Judicial Academy	Sindh
6	Gilgit-Baltistan Judicial Academy	Gilgit-Baltistan
7	Azad Kashmir Judicial Academy	Azad Kashmir

== Appointments of Judges ==
=== Supreme Court of Pakistan ===
Prior to 18th Constitutional Amendments, appointments to the Supreme Court of Pakistan were made by the President of Pakistan, on the recommendation of the Chief Justice of the Supreme Court. This system bred many allegations of favoritism. Many judges who were appointed were relatives of other Judges or Government officials. However, following the Supreme Court's judgement in the Al-Jehad Trust case, the government's role in judicial appointments was curtailed. Under the terms of this judgement, the Government and the President's office were bound to act on the recommendations of the Chief Justice of Pakistan.

After passage of the 18th and 19th Constitutional Amendments, a new Judicial Commission (named Judicial Commission of Pakistan) and Parliamentary Committee were established for appointments. The Judicial Commission of Pakistan consists of a total of nine members: the Chief Justice of Pakistan, four senior judges of the Supreme Court, a former Chief Justice or judge of the Supreme Court nominated by the serving Chief Justice in consultation with the four serving judges of the Supreme Court aforementioned, the Attorney General of Pakistan, the Federal Minister for Law and Justice and, one senior advocate nominated by the Pakistan Bar Council. The Parliamentary Committee confirms or may not confirm the nominee of the Judicial Commission. All power of executive was curtailed by the judicial commission and president has no discretionary power but only to approve the nominees. Prime minister has only ministerial power regarding the appointment procedure.

=== High Courts ===
In Appointments to the High Courts, the same procedure as in Supreme Courts appointments is adopted Prior to 18th Constitutional Amendment, High Court appointments suffered much the same criticisms as those to the Supreme Court. Future appointments will be made in the same manner as those to the Supreme Court. But instead of 4 supreme court judges, 4 most senior high court judges, provincial law minister and a member of provincial bar councils (such as Punjab Bar Council) will sit the Judicial Commission of Pakistan considering the appointment of high court judges. The age limit for the high court judge is minimum 45 years. There is no merit system for selection of Judges to higher Judiciary. Judges of the Judicial Service are generally ignored during the selection while influential Lawyers who have political support from Political Parties and Bars make it to the higher Judiciary.

=== District & Sessions Judges ===
Additional District & Sessions Judges are appointed by the Provincial & federal High Courts, from a pool of Lawyers and subordinate judges. To be eligible for appointment, Lawyers must have ten years' experience as an advocate with good standing in the respective jurisdiction. They must also pass an examination conducted by the High Courts. Subordinate judges are also promoted from senior civil judges on a seniority basis.

=== Civil Judge Cum in Judicial Magistrate ===
Civil Judge Cum in Judicial Magistrates also appointed by the Provincial High Courts, on the recommendation of provincial Public Service Commissions. These Commissions hold open competitive exams annually, which are advertised in national newspapers. The basic qualifications required are an LL.B from any recognized university, and two years' experience as an advocate in the jurisdiction in question. The exams include various compulsory papers. For example, the Punjab Public Service Commission sets compulsory papers on English Language & Essay, Urdu Language & Essay, Islamic Studies, Pakistan Studies, General Knowledge (objective test), Criminal Law, Civil Law 1 & 2, and General Law. All candidates who pass the examinations are given a psychological test. Those who pass both these stages are interviewed by members of Service Commissions, and recommendations are made to the respective High Courts for appointments. In Sindh province, the appointments are made on the backdrop of a test conducted by National testing service (NTS) which is primarily based on English language and General knowledge. The candidates who manage to pass the first test then undertake another test by NTS after which the successful candidates are chosen for the interview which is conducted by the five most senior judges of high court including chief justice of Sindh and candidate who manage to pass the interview are recommended for the post of civil judge and judicial magistrate who thereafter are appointed by the government of Sindh.

== See also ==
- Anti Terrorism Court of Pakistan
- Law and Justice Commission of Pakistan
- Jirga
- Punjab Bar Council
- Pakistan penal code
- Blasphemy law in Pakistan
- Copyright protection in Pakistan
- The Oath of Judges Order 2000
- Politics of Pakistan
- Law of Pakistan
- Women related laws in Pakistan
