= Shaukat Ali Rakhshani =

Justice of the Balochistan High Court

- شوکت علی رخشانی

Justice of the Balochistan High Court
- Incumbent
- Assumed office 7 July 2022

Judge of the Federal Shariat Court of Pakistan
- In office 3 February 2018 – 6 July 2022

Personal details
- Born: 4 August 1969 (age 57) Quetta, Balochistan, Pakistan
- Education: St. Francis' Grammar School (Matriculation); University Law College, Quetta (LL.B); Federal Judicial Academy (Refresher Course)

Shaukat Ali Rakhshani (Urdu: شوکت علی رخشانی, born 4 August 1969) is a Pakistani jurist who has been a Justice of the Balochistan High Court (BHC) since 7 July 2022.

== Early life ==
Born on 4 August 1969, in Quetta, Balochistan, Rakhshani hails from Dalbandin, Chagai District. His father, Muhammad Shafi Rakhshani, was a distinguished advocate who held key positions such as Advocate General Balochistan, Deputy Attorney General Pakistan, and Deputy Prosecutor General (NAB).

== Education ==
Rakhshani completed his early education at St. Francis' Grammar School, matriculating in 1984. After F.Sc and graduation, he pursued LL.B at University Law College Quetta, earning distinction in 1990. He undertook a Refresher Course from Federal Judicial Academy in 1995.

== Career ==
Enrolling as an Advocate in 1991, he later became an Advocate High Court in 1993 and an Advocate of the Supreme Court of Pakistan (SCP) in 2008.

Throughout his career, he held various roles in legal associations, including Joint Secretary of Balochistan Bar Association and leadership positions in the High Court Bar Association, Balochistan.

Rakhshani handled high-profile criminal cases in the BHC and the SCP, specializing in murder, NAB, Control of Narcotics Substance, and Constitutional Petitions. He served as Judge, Anti-Terrorism Court, Quetta, from 2002 to 2005.

Beyond his judicial career, he served as an advisor to Askari Bank, Special Prosecutor Customs and Taxation Balochistan, and counsel for the Speaker, Provincial Assembly of Balochistan. He also lectured on criminal law at various law colleges.

Appointed as a Judge of the Federal Shariat Court of Pakistan on 3 February 2018, Rakhshani became an Additional Judge of the BHC on 7 July 2022, later confirmed as a Judge on 27 June 2023.
