= Sardar Ahmed Haleemi =

Justice of the Balochistan High Court

- سردار احمد حلیمی

Justice of the Balochistan High Court
- Incumbent
- Assumed office 7 July 2022

Personal details
- Born: 12 February 1975 (age 51) Quetta, Balochistan, Pakistan
- Education: Government Science College Quetta; University Law College, Quetta (LL.B)

Sardar Ahmed Haleemi (Urdu: سردار احمد حلیمی, born 12 February 1975) is a Pakistani jurist who has been a Justice in the Balochistan High Court (BHC) since 7 July 2022.

== Early life and education ==
Haleemi, born on 12 February 1975, in Quetta, hails from Mastung District. The son of retired police officer Haibat Khan Haleemi, Haleemi completed his education in Quetta, graduating in Mathematics and Statistics from Government Science College and in Law from University Law College in 1998.

== Career ==
Commencing his advocacy career in December 2012 at the BHC and later at the Supreme Court of Pakistan from 12 November 2014, Haleemi practiced law for over 22 years. His legal experience covered Criminal, Civil, Electoral, Services, Revenue, and Constitutional cases, many of which are documented in law journals.

In his professional journey, he served as Special Public Prosecutor for NAB and ATA, offering legal consultancy to various entities such as Bank AL Habib, Oil & Gas Development Company, National Logistics Corporation, SBK University, Quetta Electric Supply Company, Quetta Club Ltd, and Defence Housing Authority Quetta.

Haleemi engaged in legislative efforts, reviewing and proposing amendments to the "Balochistan Protection against Harassment of Women at Workplace Act, 2016." He also delivered lectures at the Balochistan Judicial Academy and educated officials/officers of the Prison Department on Jail Manual/laws.

Beyond the legal sphere, Haleemi initiated sports clubs to promote activities like Taekwondo, boxing, and football, organizing Balochistan's first International Professional Boxing Event in 2018. He collaborated with the Honorary Counsel General of Sri Lanka for Punjab to secure corneas for Balochistan residents in need and facilitated monthly Blood Camps for Thalassemia patients. Additionally, he contributed to environmental conservation by planting trees and served as a member of the Management Committee of Quetta Club Limited. He is also known for supporting the "Dar-ul-Falah Islamia" orphanage.

Haleemi was elevated as an Additional Judge of the BHC on 7 July 2022, and confirmed as a Judge on 27 June 2023.
