= Military education and training =

Training for military activities

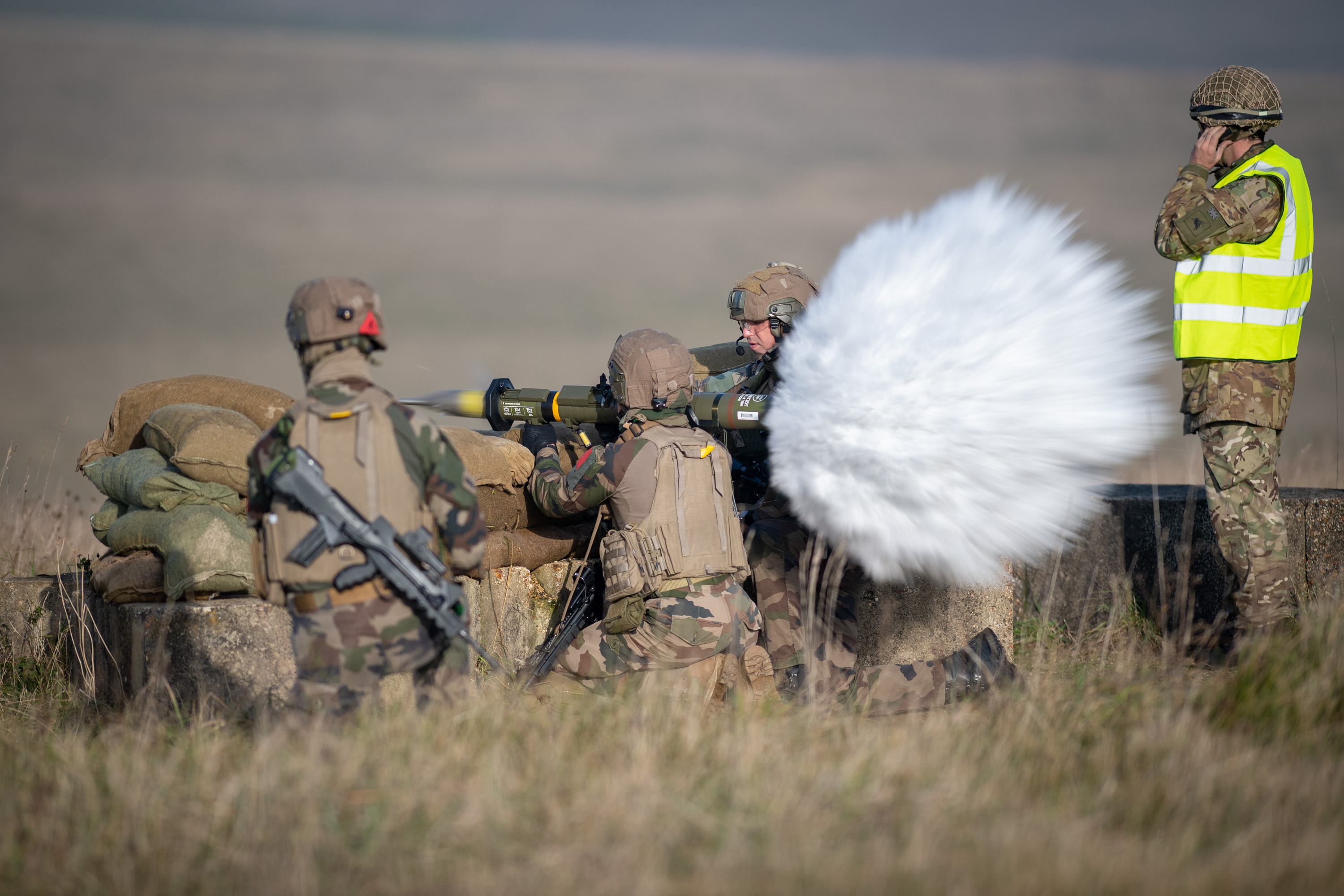
French soldiers training alongside the Parachute Regiment of the British Army

Military education and training is a process which intends to establish and improve the capabilities of military personnel in their respective roles. Military training may be voluntary or compulsory duty. It begins with recruit training, proceeds to education and training specific to military roles, and sometimes includes additional training during a military career. Directing staff are the military personnel who comprise the instructional staff at a military training institution.

In some countries, military education and training are parts of the compulsory education. The organizers believe that military education can bring some benefits and experiences that cannot be obtained from normal class like setback education. Moreover, participants are able to learn survival skills during the military education, like co-operations and resilience, which help participants improve the capabilities of military personnel in their respective roles.

== Recruit training ==
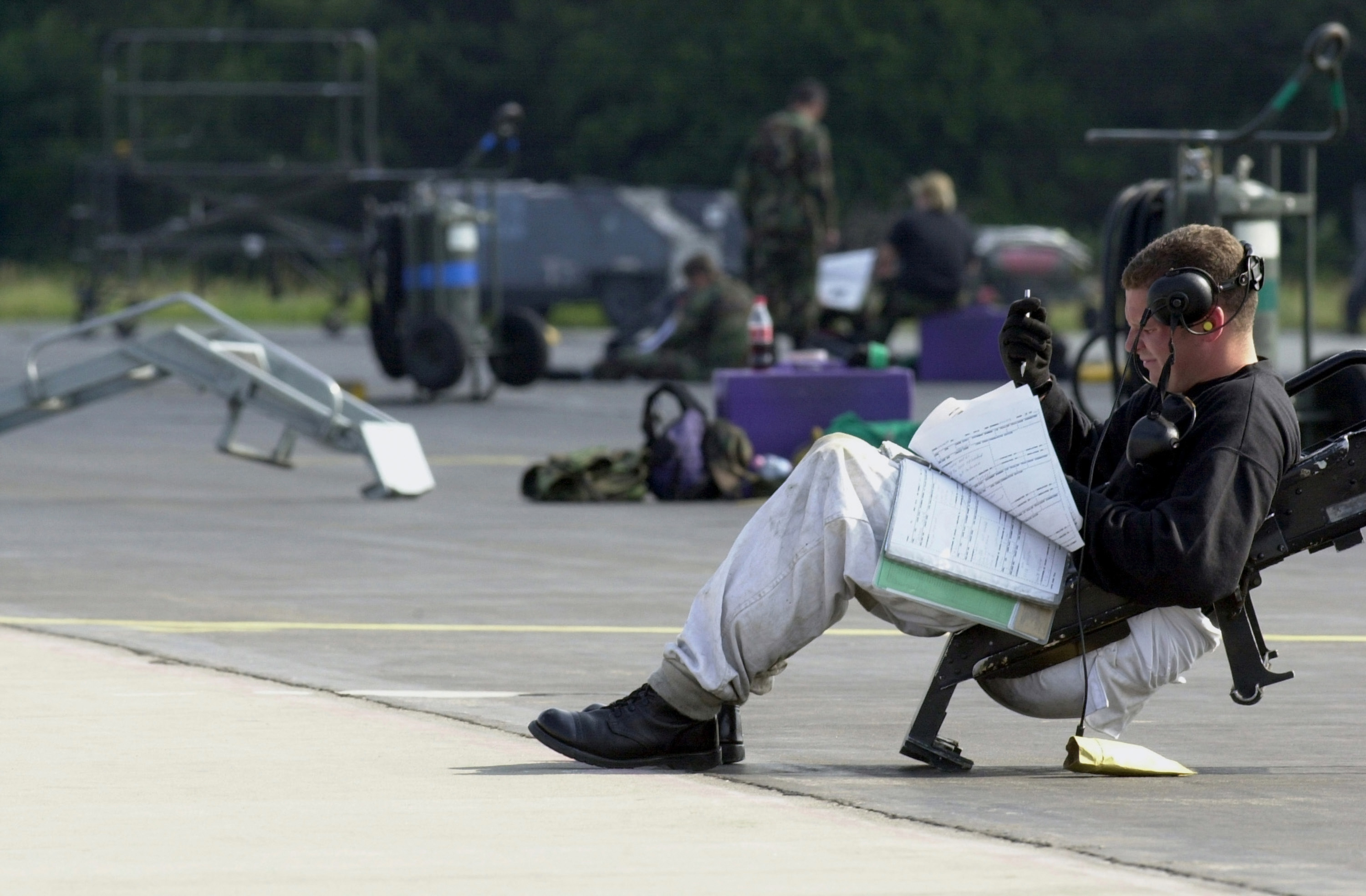
US Air Force Senior Airman Jason Via catching up on written work during training.

The primary and initial form of military training, recruit training, makes use of various conditioning techniques to resocialize trainees into a military system, to ensure that they will obey all orders without hesitation, and to teach basic military skills.

Resocialization as a sociological concept involves the process of mentally and emotionally "retraining" individuals so that they can operate in a new environment; it promotes changes to an individual's attitudes and behaviours. The drill instructor has the task of making the service members fit for military use.

== Role-specific training ==
After their recruit training, personnel may undergo further training specific to their military role, including the use of any specialist equipment. They are then normally deemed fit for military service.

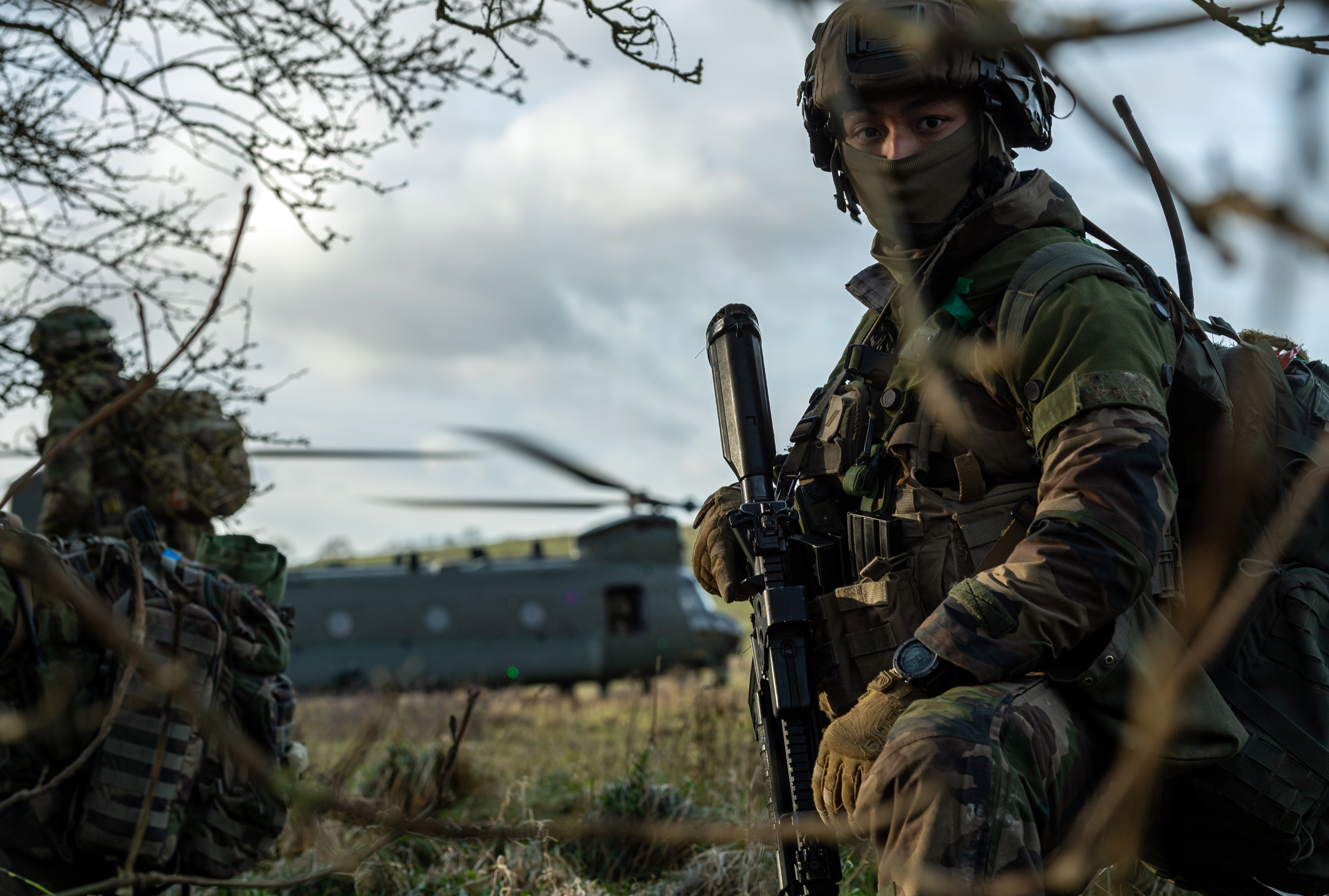
French paratroopers in the Salisbury Plain Training Area during Exercise Wessex Storm.

== Further training ==
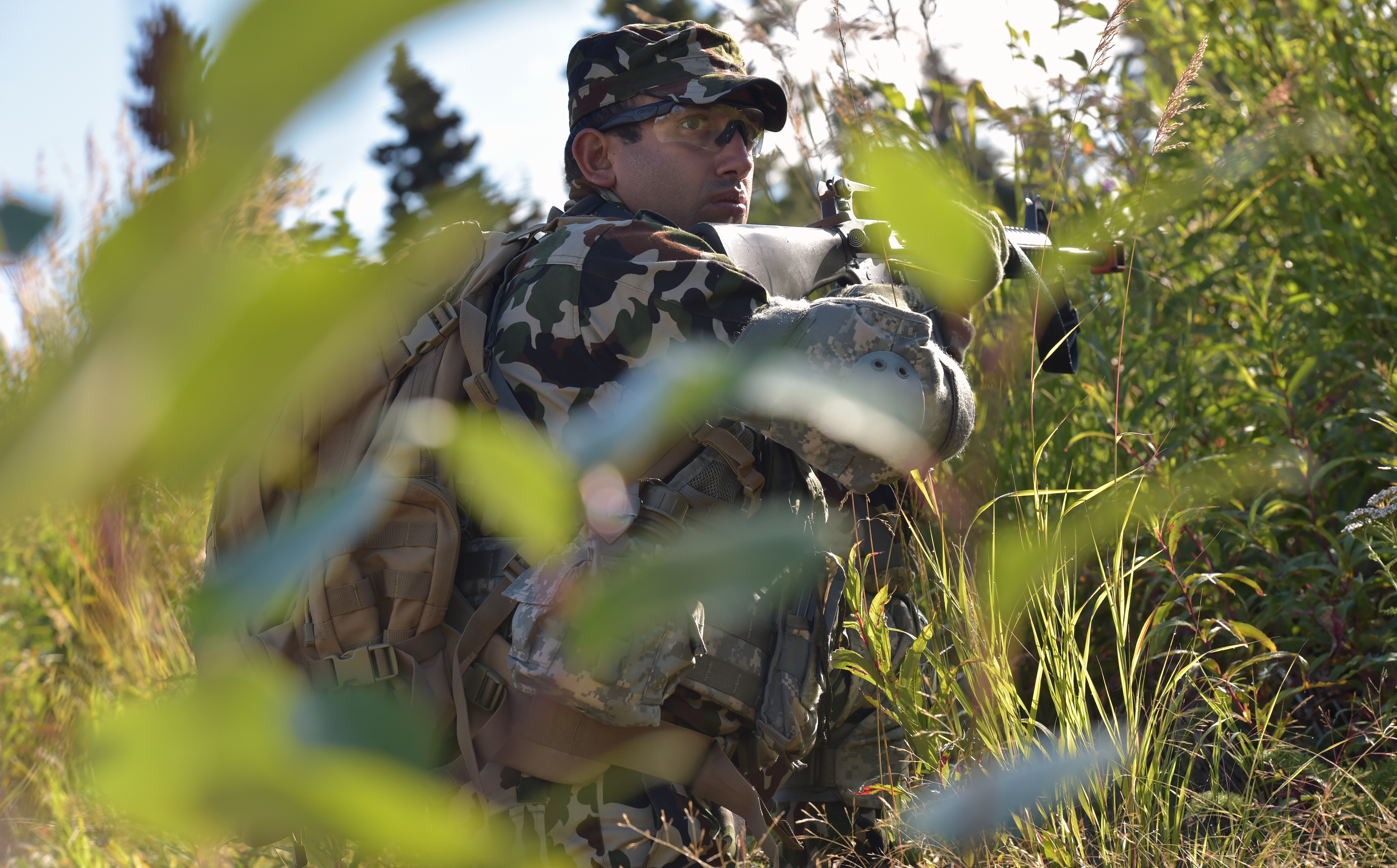
Nepalese soldiers during a training exercise

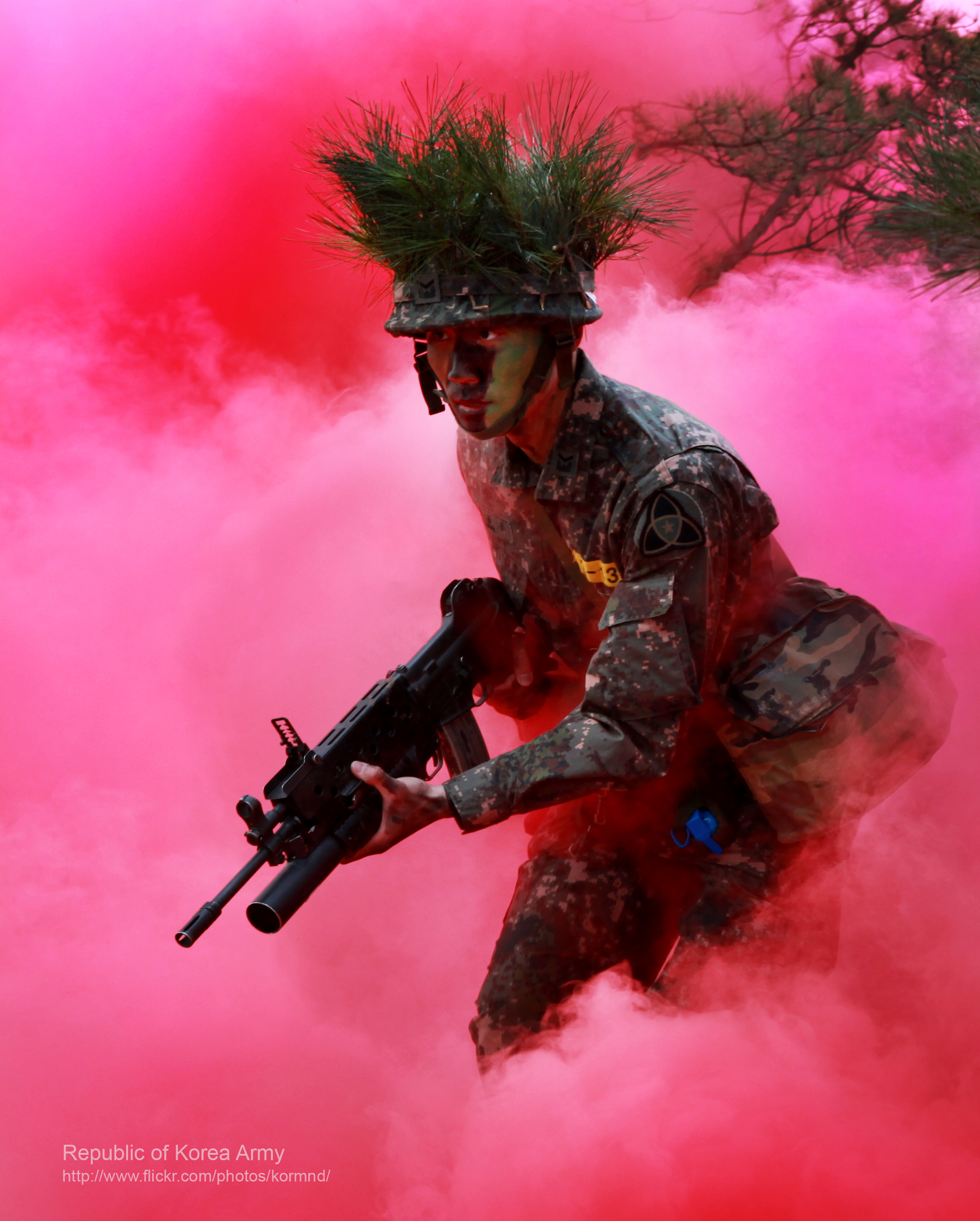
ROK army recruits training, May 2014

Military personnel may continue to receive training during their career.

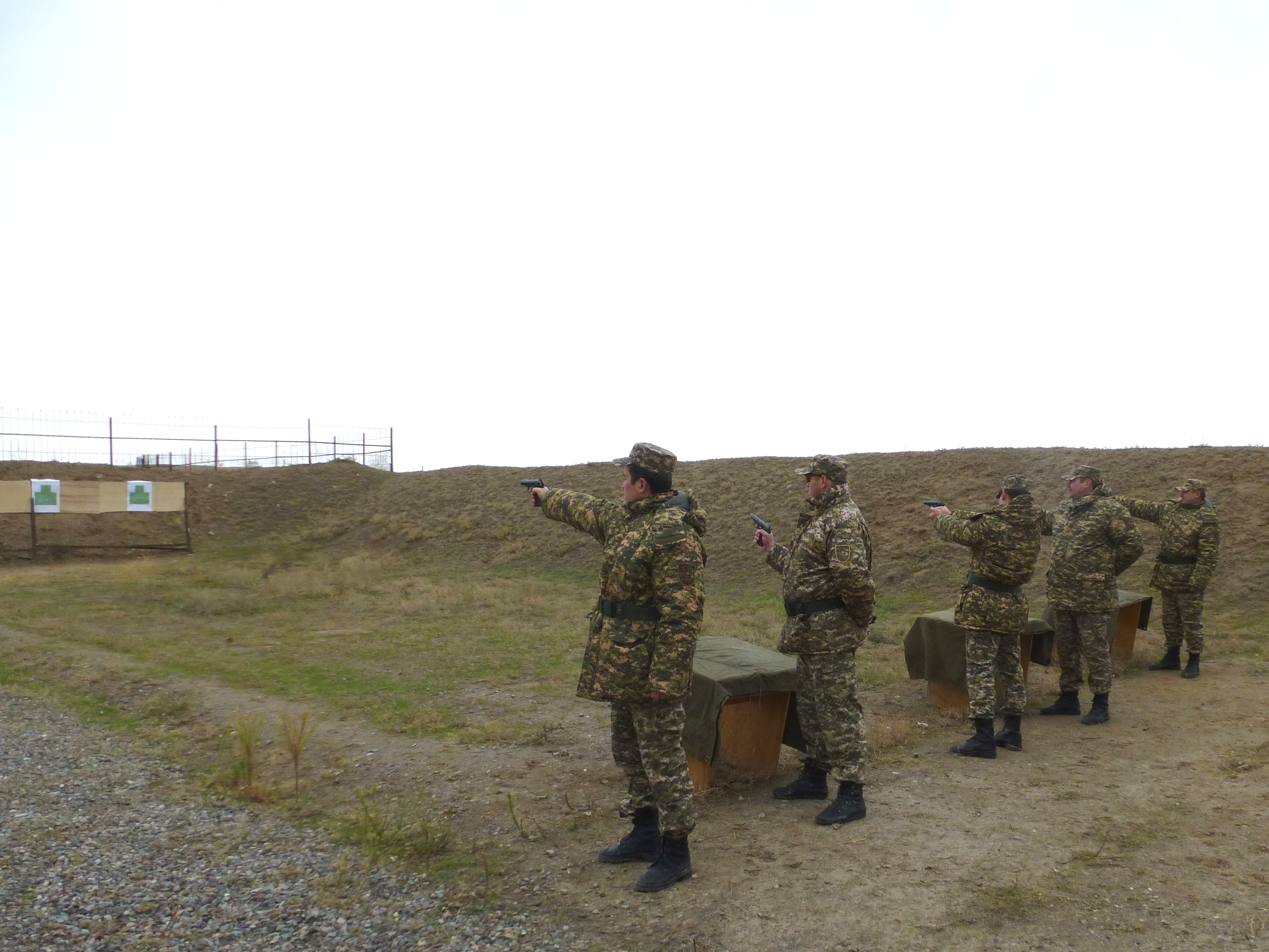
Kazakhstani military personnel at the Almaty Institute of the Kazakh Ground Forces.

== See also ==
- Military academy
  - List of United States military schools and academies
  - Royal Military Academy Sandhurst
  - Royal Military College of Canada
  - Military academies in Russia
  - Military academies in India
- Military discipline
- Military science
- Refresher training
- Staff college
