= Kamran Khan Mulakhail =

Muhammad Kamran Khan Mulakhail

Justice of Balochistan High Court
- Incumbent
- Assumed office 30 August 2013

Personal details
- Born: 19 January 1968 (age 58)
- Education: Tameer-i-Nau Public College (Intermediate); University Law College, Quetta (LL.B)

Muhammad Kamran Khan Mulakhail (born 19 January 1968) is a Pakistani jurist. He has been a judge of the Balochistan High Court since 30 August 2013. Justice Mulakhail was appointed as the acting Chief Justice of that court on 17 November 2025 and regular Chief Justice three weeks later.
