= Zakaullah =

Zakaullah is both a masculine given name and surname. Notable people with the name include:

== Given name ==
- Zakaullah Dehlvi (1832–1910), British–Indian scholar and historian
- Zakaullah Lodhi (1934–1984), Pakistani judge

== Surname ==
- Arbab Zakaullah, Pakistani politician
- Muhammad Zakaullah (born 1958), Pakistani Navy officer
