= Mir Ali Dost Bugti =

Pakistani judge

- Born: 18 October 1920; Dera Bugti, Balochistan, Pakistan
- Died: 8 July 1984 (aged 63); Karachi, Pakistan
- Occupation: Judge
- Office: Justice of the Balochistan High Court
- Relatives: Nawab Akbar Khan Bugti

Mir Ali Dost Bugti (Urdu/Balochi: میر علی دوست بگٹی; 18 October 1920 – 8 July 1984) was a Pakistani judge. He was the first Baloch judge to be appointed to the Balochistan High Court.

Bugti was born in Dera Bugti. He completed his primary schooling in Dera Bugti, the highest level of education available there, and then went to Sibi for matriculation. He later attended Aligarh Muslim University where he obtained a law degree. He was then appointed as a High Court judge in Quetta, Balochistan. He was colloquially referred to as "Judge Bugti".
