= Gul Hassan Tareen =

Justice of the Balochistan High Court

- گُل حسن ترین

Justice of the Balochistan High Court
- Incumbent
- Assumed office 7 July 2022

Personal details
- Born: 24 June 1974 (age 52)

Gul Hassan Tareen (Urdu: گُل حسن ترین, born 24 June 1974) is a Pakistani jurist who has been a judge of the Balochistan High Court (BHC) since 7 July 2022.

== Career ==
Prior to assuming the role of a judge, he served as an Advocate High Court. He was appointed as an Additional Judge of the BHC on 7 July 2022, and subsequently confirmed as a Judge on 27 June 2023.
