= Fazal ur Rehman (judge) =

Fazal ur Rehman فضل رحمان
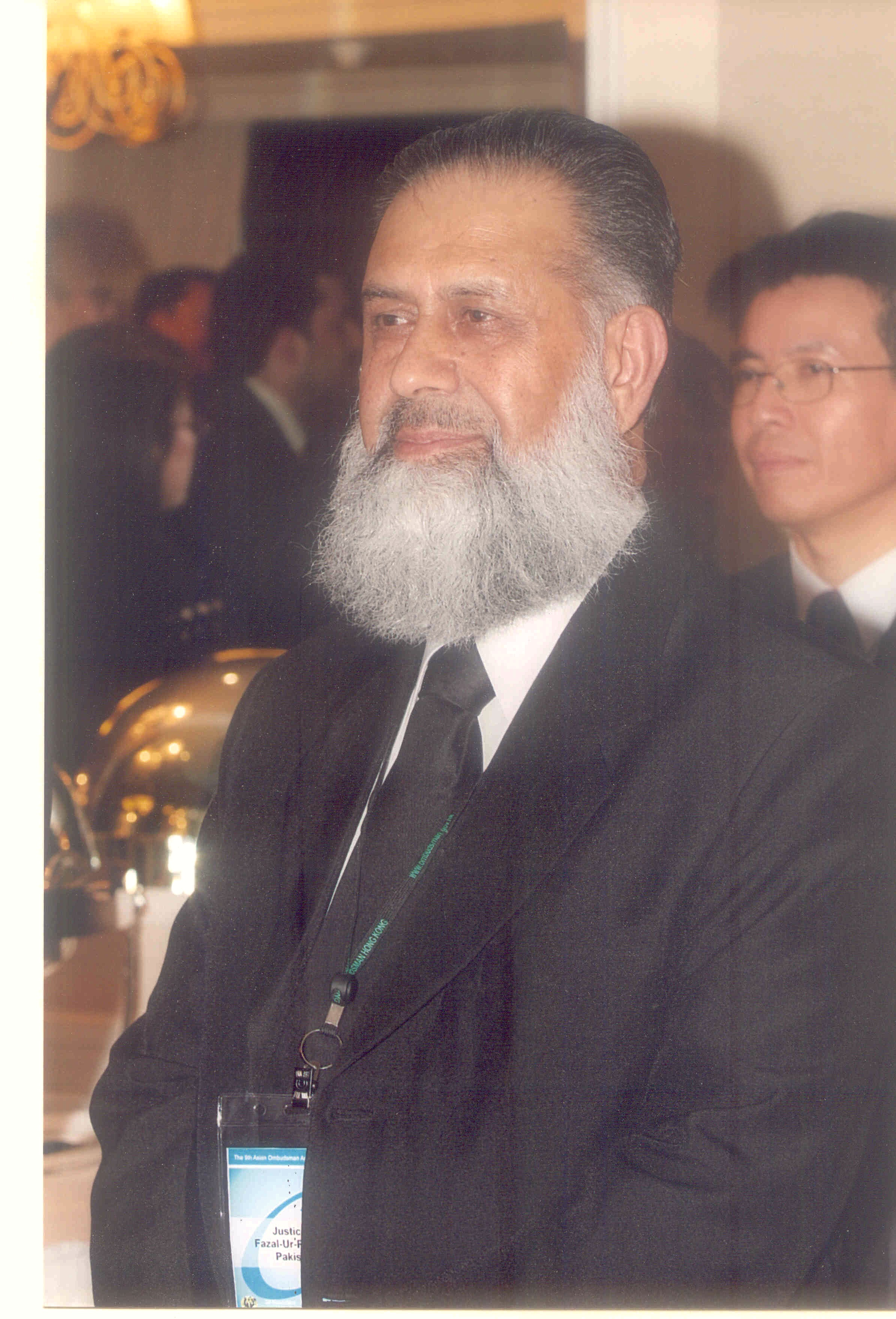

Member Election Commission of Pakistan
- Incumbent
- Assumed office 13 June 2011

Provincial Ombudsman, Balochistan
- In office 14 April 2005 – 13 April 2009
- Appointed by: Owais Ahmed Ghani

Judge Balochistan High Court
- In office 21 June 1999 – 12 April 2005

Personal details
- Born: 13 April 1943 (age 83) Quetta, Pakistan
- Citizenship: Pakistani
- Education: Sindh Muslim Law College

Fazal Ur Rehman (Urdu: جسٹس فضل رحمان ); born 13 April 1943, is a retired Pakistani judge.

== Academia ==
He matriculated from Islamia High School, Quetta in 1963. Passed B.Com, from Government College of Commerce and Economics, Karachi in 1967. Did LL.B from the University of Karachi in the year of 1969. Stood all round first in PPSI course. Appointed as Presiding Officer, Labour Court in the year of 1978 and worked as Presiding Officer/ Additional District & Session Judge and then promoted as District & Session Judge on 20 December 1983. He remained Special Judge Anti Corruption Balochistan, Member Inspection Team High Court. He worked as District & Session Judge at various stations in the Province of Balochistan from time to time. Has done the Shariah Course in Shariah Academy International Islamic University, Islamabad from 20 October 1982 to 20 January 1983. Did seventh Advanced Course in Management conducted by NIPA Quetta. Appointed as Member Inquiry Committee by the Government of Balochistan in 1989 to look into the irregularities committed by MPAs. Also appointed as Member of Commission during the year, 1992 to determine the new limits of Municipal Corporation, Quetta and also conducted various other inquiries. Taught as honorary Lecturer in University Law College, Quetta.

== Career ==
Remained Law Secretary, Government of Balochistan for a period of more than two years and he was elevated as Additional Judge to the High Court of Balochistan on 21 June 1999, appointed as permanent Judge of the said Court on 6 June 2000. He was appointed as Chairman, Provisional Zakat Council on 1 March 2000, Chairman Labour Appellate Tribunal on 30 May 2000, Election Tribunal for the trial and disposal of election petition relating to senate Election in respect of Balochistan Province in the year, 2003, member Steering Committee Access to Justice Program for the Province in Balochistan and member Rule Committee High Court of Balochistan on 11 June 2004.

Appointed as acting Provincial Ombudsman (Mohtasib) Balochistan on 21 March 2005. Retired as Judge of the Balochistan High Court on 12 April 2005. Appointed as Provincial Ombudsman (Mohtasib) Balochistan on 14 April 2005 and completed his tenure on 13 April 2009. Appointed as Chairman of the Commission of Inquiry of Enforced Disappearances from March 2011 to 12 June 2011. Appointed as Member Election Commission of Pakistan on 13 June 2011 for five years.

He attended various National and International Conferences, Seminars, Workshops and Symposiums in Country and abroad. He visited Saudi Arabia, Bangladesh, Philippines, Singapore, Thailand, Hong Kong, Macao, Vietnam, United States of America, Turkey, Kyrgyzstan, Azerbaijan, Guyana and Canada.
