= Retraining =

Process of learning a new or upgrading an old skill set or trade

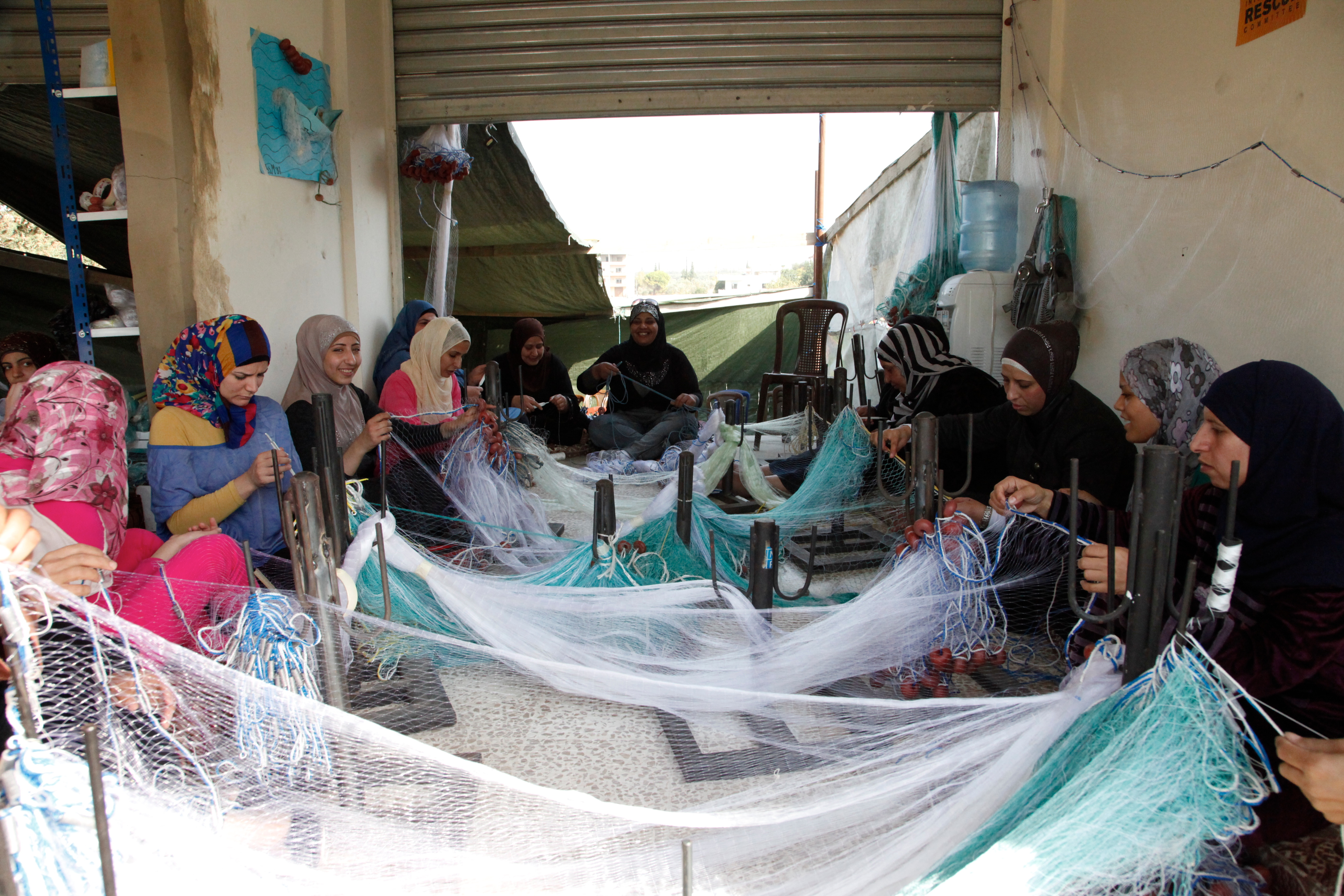
These Syrian refugees and local Lebanese women are being retrained to make fishing nets.

Retraining is the process of learning or teaching new skills, or known skills in new ways. Upskilling is the process of improving skills in a current role, whereas reskilling develops new skills for new roles. Retraining may be a business priority that companies or organizations conduct on a regular basis, in order to avoid personnel obsolescence due to technological changes, as well as to refresh the knowledge base of its personnel. Retraining may also indicate the repetition of a prior training.

== Terminology ==
Retraining may be in the form of refresher training, undertaken to refresh memory and ensure that worker knowledge is contemporary.

Upskilling means acquiring new skills, or enhancing existing skills, to enhance job performance. Reskilling is the acquisition of new skills that may enable a pivot to a different career, or industry, in an evolving job market. Common methods of upskilling, or retraining, and reskilling include enrolling in online education resources, educational software, attending trade school programs, workplace training, on-the-job training, intelligent tutoring systems, or earning professional certifications.

An October 2021 OECD case study report, Training in Enterprises, found that employers may offer reskilling resources in order to lessen the effects of layoffs and/or to demonstrate social responsibility.

== Demographics ==
The need to retrain workers is often thought to apply to older members of the workforce, many of whom saw their occupations disappear and their skills lose value, eroded by technology, outsourcing, and a weak economy. While older Americans do not face as high a rate of unemployment as the country’s teenagers and young adults, when they do find themselves unemployed, they remain unemployed for more than twice as long as teenagers.

Youth in the U.S., OECD member countries, and Africa are widely impacted by skills gaps. The divide between skills possessed by the workforce and those that employers are actively seeking is significant and stagnating to employment prospects. In the United States, psychology, history and the performing arts make up 22% of college degrees earned. Demand for skilled employees, however, is in the areas of technology and engineering, accounting for only 5% of conferred degrees to 2014. “In both Britain and the United States, many people with expensive liberal arts degrees are finding it impossible to get decent jobs,” reported the Economist in its April 27, 2013 issue, adding that, in northern Africa, job applicants with degrees face an unemployment level twice that of non-degreed candidates.

While technology anxiety and a nervousness about learning new processes and acquiring new skill sets has impacted older workers, younger job seekers are also facing a deficit of "applied soft skills" such as work ethic, social skills, communication and leadership.

The World Economic Forum (WEF) Future of Jobs Report 2025 predicts that about 39% of existing workforce skill sets will either transform or become outmoded during 2025-2030, noting a marked uptick in worker retraining, reskilling or upskilling measures, over the previous two years. According to the WEF report, since 2021, a third of global jobs reflect fundamental skill changes, with 25% of jobs seeing 75% of required skills changed.

== Policy issues ==
The need for greater partnership and transfer of information between institutions of higher education is essential in reducing the skills gap for old and young people alike. Expanded internships, returnships, and post-hiring training can help from the employers’ perspective and upgraded and more authentic technical training will help close the gap on the side of educators. The World Bank's 2019 World Development Report on the future of work explains that flexible learning opportunities at universities and adult learning programs that allow workers to retrain and retool are vital in order for labor markets to adjust to the future of work.

There is some controversy surrounding the use of retraining to offset economic changes caused by free trade and automation. For example, most studies show that displaced factory workers in the United States on the average have lower wages after retraining to other positions when a factory is closed due to offshoring. A similar issue surrounds movement from technical jobs to liaison jobs due to offshore outsourcing. Such changes may also favor certain personality types over others, due to the changing tasks and skills required. Other research estimates that one academic year of such retraining at a community college increases the long-term earnings by about 8%for older males and by about 10% for older females.

Government policy may make a difference in employability and motivation for retraining and re-entry into the workforce for older workers. In economies with greater regulations surrounding the hiring, termination and wages, reductions in unemployment were difficult to achieve. The very groups harmed by continued higher unemployment were those that the regulations sought to protect.

Retraining is sometimes offered as part of workfare programs, which may include support for transportation, childcare, or an internship.

== Unemployment effects ==
Retraining older and younger workers alike to prepare for a changing workforce has lasting impacts on workers. Unemployed workers are at significantly greater risk for poor physical health, greater stress, alcoholism, marital problems and even suicide. Among young workers, beginning their careers with extended bouts of joblessness results in lower overall earnings and more unemployment throughout their careers.

== Career cushioning ==
In human resources, "career cushioning" refers to employees who discreetly upskill and network as a contingency plan in the event of job loss.

Career cushioning may involved getting certifications, expanding professional networks, updating resumes and profiles, and discretely applying to alternative jobs. The proactive approach provides a sense of security during uncertain economic times. Employers can combat career cushioning by improving their market competitiveness.

The term came to prominence in 2022 following the COVID-19 pandemic layoffs and stems from cushioning in dating, where partners have a backup plan and cushioning a fall. The hedge against unemployment has become more commonplace as job security has decreased.

== See also ==
- Apprenticeship
- Career and technical education
- Computational upskilling
- Efficiency
- Hard skills
- Intelligent tutoring system
- Labor shortage
- Microdegree
- Professional certification
- Refresher training
- Skill sharing
- Standardization
- Sustainability
- Trade Adjustment Assistance
- Training camp
- Vocational rehabilitation
