= M.A. Rasheed =

Pakistani judge

Justice M.A. Rasheed was a Civil Servant of Pakistan (CSP) who was later on inducted into the judiciary and served as the chief justice of the Balochistan High Court from October 1977 to July 1978. He served as a District and Sessions Judge in the District Courts of Bahawalpur from 1966 to 1968. He is the only judge of Pakistan to have taken his oath of office in the United States. He refused to take oath under military dictator Zia-ul-Haq's Provisional Constitutional Order of 1981. Later on he served as Vice Chancellor of the University of Balochistan.
