= Aamir Nawaz Rana =

Justice of the Balochistan High Court

Nawaz Rana
- محمد عامر نواز رانا

Justice of the Balochistan High Court
- Incumbent
- Assumed office 7 July 2022

Personal details
- Born: 21 November 1974 (age 51)
- Relations: Iftikhar Muhammad Chaudhry (uncle)

Muhammad Aamir Nawaz Rana (Urdu: محمد عامر نواز رانا, born 21 November 1974) is a Pakistani jurist who has been serving as a Justice in the Balochistan High Court (BHC) since 7 July 2022.

== Career ==
Before becoming a judge, he worked as an Advocate High Court and held the position of Chief of the Balochistan High Court Bar Association. He was appointed as an Additional Judge of the BHC on 7 July 2022, and confirmed as a Judge of that court on 27 June 2023.

He served on the appellant bench responsible for reviewing appeals against the decisions made by Returning Officers concerning the acceptance or rejection of candidates' nomination papers for the General Elections-2024.
