= Punjab Judicial Academy =

Judicial training institution of Punjab

- اکادمی عدالتی پنجاب
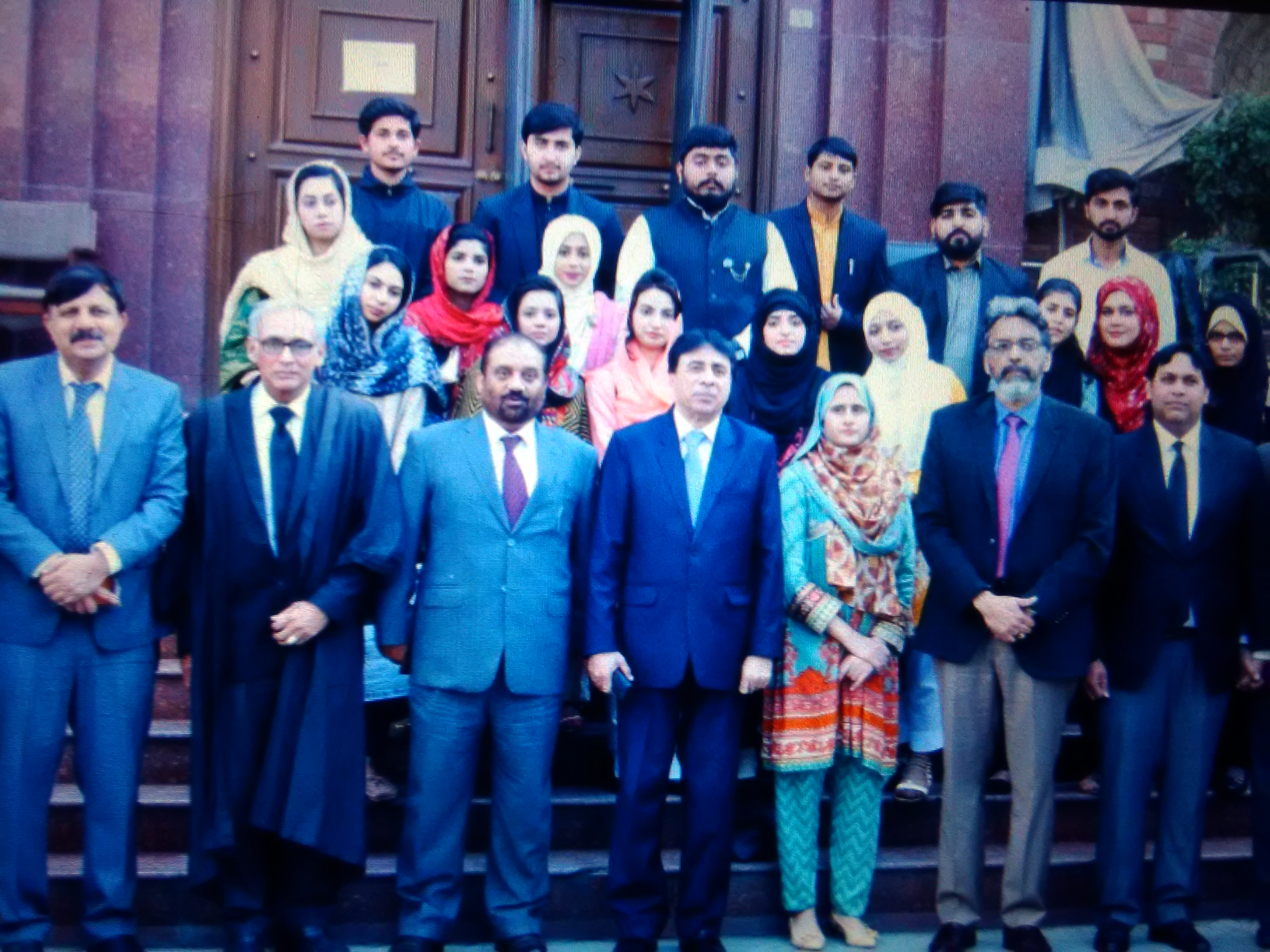
- Lawyers and students at the Academy (2021)

Agency overview
- Formed: 2007; 19 years ago
- Jurisdiction: Punjab
- Parent agency: Government of Punjab, Pakistan
- Key document: Punjab Judicial Academy Act, 2007
- Website: www.pja.gov.pk

The Punjab Judicial Academy is an agency of the government of Punjab, Pakistan. It was established in 2007 under The Punjab Judicial Academy Act, 2007. The academy provides pre-service and in-service training to the provincial judicial officers and court personnel. The administration of the academy is managed by a board under the leadership of the chief justice of the Lahore High Court and an appointed director-general.

== See also ==
- Federal Judicial Academy
- Khyber Pakhtunkhwa Judicial Academy
- Balochistan Judicial Academy
- Sindh Judicial Academy
- Gilgit-Baltistan Judicial Academy
