= Tameer-i-Nau Public College =

College in Quetta, Pakistan

- تعمیر نو عوامی کالج تعمیرِ نو عامه کالج دانشکده عمومی تعمیرِ نو
- Motto: Wisdom is the base of my deen (religion) and knowledge is my power
- Type: Private
- Established: July 1984
- President: Fazal Haq Mir (S.I)
- Faculty: 38
- Undergraduates: 950
- Location: Quetta, Balochistan, Pakistan
- Campus: 4.5 acres (0.5km²)
- Colors: White shirt and Gray trousers
- Nickname: Tameerians

Tameer-i-Nau Public College is an educational institution in the province of Balochistan, Pakistan. The campus is situated in the centre of the provincial capital city of Quetta. A former Principal was awarded the Sitara-e-Imtiaz for distinguished service.

== Establishment ==
The college was established in July 1983 as an initiative of local people. Today it remains a non-commercial institution governed by a registered body, Idara Tameer-i-Nau.

The Principal of Tameer-i-Nau public College, (Late) Fazal-Haq-Mir, was awarded Sitara-i-Imtiaz by the President of Pakistan in recognition of his outstanding service in the field of education. This is unusual for a provincial institution because usually the medal is given to the person who has achieved excellence in his or her field at the national or international levels.

The Federal Ministry of Education, Islamabad, has awarded the college the Certificate of Merit and Excellence for the fifth consecutive time, judging it as the best college in Balochistan.

The institution is planning to transform its infrastructure into a university

== College complex ==
The college building consists of eighteen lecture rooms; five Science laboratories, a Principal's Office, a conference hall, a staff room, an accounting office, a gymnasium, a Science room, a library, an Audio-Video room, a playground, a mosque.

The complex is spread over 18,000 square metres (4.5 acres). Plans are to use the surrounding 300,000 square metres (75 acres) of land through an investment of Rs 530 million to establish a complex comprising a model school, girls' high school, inter college, degree college, university, and an IT institute.

== Uniform ==
Students wear the uniform during college hours, which is a white shirt and navy blue trousers with black shoes, also a red necktie. The winter uniform adds navy blue sweaters or navy blue blazers.

== See also ==
- Education in Pakistan
