= Zakaullah Lodhi =

Pakistani judge (1934–1984)

Justice Zakaullah Lodhi
- ذکاء اللہ لودھی

Judge of Federal Shariat Court
- In office 1980–1981

Personal details
- Born: 28 February 1934 Bareilly, British Raj
- Died: 19 October 1984 (aged 50)

Justice Zakaullah Lodhi (Urdu: ذکاء اللہ لودھی, 28 February 1934 – 19 October 1984) was a Pakistani judge.

== Biography ==
He was born in Bareilly, British India to Ikramullah Khan Lodhi. He migrated with his family to Pakistan in 1947, settling in Quetta, Balochistan. Lodhi earned his bachelor's degree from University of Punjab and his LLB from S. M. Law College, Karachi and entered into legal practice in 1960, enrolled as Advocate High Court and Supreme Court, he was the member of Balochistan Bar, assumed different roles in Balochistan Bar and also served as President of the Bar. He lectured in Balochistan Law College.

He was appointed Judge of National Industrial Relations Commission (NIRC), Islamabad before his oath-taking as judge of the High Court Sindh - Balochistan on 15 October 1974. He was a founding member of Federal Shariat Court of Pakistan and served as its judge from 28 May 1980 to 24 March 1981.

Justice Lodhi was elevated to the highest judicial position of the province and sworn in as the Chief Justice of Balochistan High Court on 25 March 1981, to this position he remained until his death on 19 October 1984.

He was famous for his landmark verdicts and his literary contributions. He was a thinker, poet and authored books. He held Honorary Membership of Various Academic, Educational and Welfare Bodies.
