= Sindh Judicial Academy =

Pakistani provincial judicial training institution

- اکادمی عدالتی بسندھ سنڌ عدالتي اڪيڊمي

Agency overview
- Formed: 1992; 34 years ago
- Jurisdiction: Sindh
- Parent agency: Government of Sindh
- Key document: Sindh Judicial Academy Act, 1993
- Website: www.sja.gos.pk

The Sindh Judicial Academy is an agency of the provincial government of Sindh, Pakistan. The academy was established in Karachi in 1992 under Sindh Judicial Academy Act, 1993 passed by Sindh Assembly. The academy provides pre-service and in-service training to the judicial officers and court personnel. The management and administration of the academy are run by a board under leadership of the Chief Justice of Sindh High Court and an appointed Director-General.

== See also ==
- Federal Judicial Academy
- Khyber Pakhtunkhwa Judicial Academy
- Punjab Judicial Academy
- Balochistan Judicial Academy
- Gilgit-Baltistan Judicial Academy
