= Khyber Pakhtunkhwa Judicial Academy =

Institution of higher learning in Peshawar, Pakistan

- د خیبر پښتونخوا عدالتي اکاډمۍ

Agency overview
- Formed: 2011; 15 years ago
- Jurisdiction: Khyber Pakhtunkhwa
- Parent agency: Government of Khyber Pakhtunkhwa
- Key document: Khyber Pakhtunkhwa judicial act, 2011
- Website: www.kpja.edu.pk

The Kyber Pakhtunkhwa Judicial Academy is an agency of the provincial Government of Khyber Pakhtunkhwa, in Pakistan. Based in Peshawar, it focuses on legal and judicial studies and training of the provincial judicial officers and court personnel.

== Founding ==
The academy was founded in March 2011 by the chief justice of Peshawar High Court, Justice Dost Muhammad Khan, after consultation with former director general (Hayat Ali Shah) and former dean of the faculty (Dr. Khursheed Iqbal). The governor of Khyber Pakhtunkhwa established the academy with an ordinance issued on 28 December 2011. On 17 January 2012, the Khyber Pakhtunkhwa Assembly passed the Khyber Pakhtunkhwa Judicial Academy Act. The academy was inaugurated on 18 July 2012 by its chairman, Justice Khan.

== Board of Governors ==
The academy is governed by a board of governors, which includes the chief justice of the Peshawar High Court as chairman, the court's senior puisne judge as vice-chairman. Members include the additional chief secretary of the provincial government, the finance secretary, the secretary of law, human rights and parliamentary affairs, the provincial advocate general, the Peshawar High Court registrar, the PHC Member Inspection Team, the PHC additional registrar, the principal/Dean, Faculty of Law University of Peshawar and the director-general as Member-cum-secretary.

== Training ==
The academy has conducted more than 100 training sessions for members of the provincial judicial system, including judges, attorneys, probation officers, police, and Federally Administered Tribal Areas administrators. Training of trainers was also conducted after a training-needs-assessment survey. The academy has conducted training in substantive and procedural law, judgment writing, case and court management, mediation, human rights, the right to information, and building judicial capacity of political administration in the FATA. Training reports are available on the academy website. The academy has hosted more than 30 workshops and seminars on contemporary provincial issues in partnership with international and national humanitarian bodies such as the UNDP, the World Bank, UNICEF, UNWOMEN Pakistan, UNODC, GIZ, SACH, DOST, Foundation da Khwaindo Kor, RSIL & International Committee of Red Cross (ICRC), Justice System Support Program (JSSP).

== Postgraduate institute ==
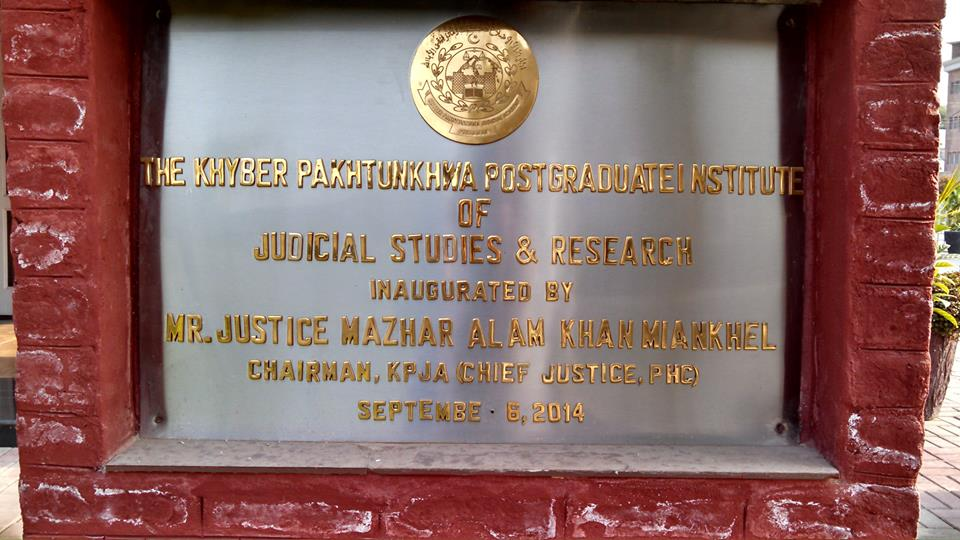
Postgraduate institute sign

The Judicial Academy was granted degree-awarding status by the Higher Education Commission. In early 2014, degree courses in legal studies and research (including LL.M. and Ph.D.) were planned.

== Research wing ==
The academy is equipped with Research wing supported by the UNDP which has so far produced reports on two research projects. The academy conducted the following three studies with the support of the donor organizations; Gaps between formal and informal justice systems in Malakand, Civil cases culminating to criminal cases—a baseline study in trends in crimes in Swat and Dir Upper districts, and Efficacy of judicial system in Malakand.

== Radio Meezan ==
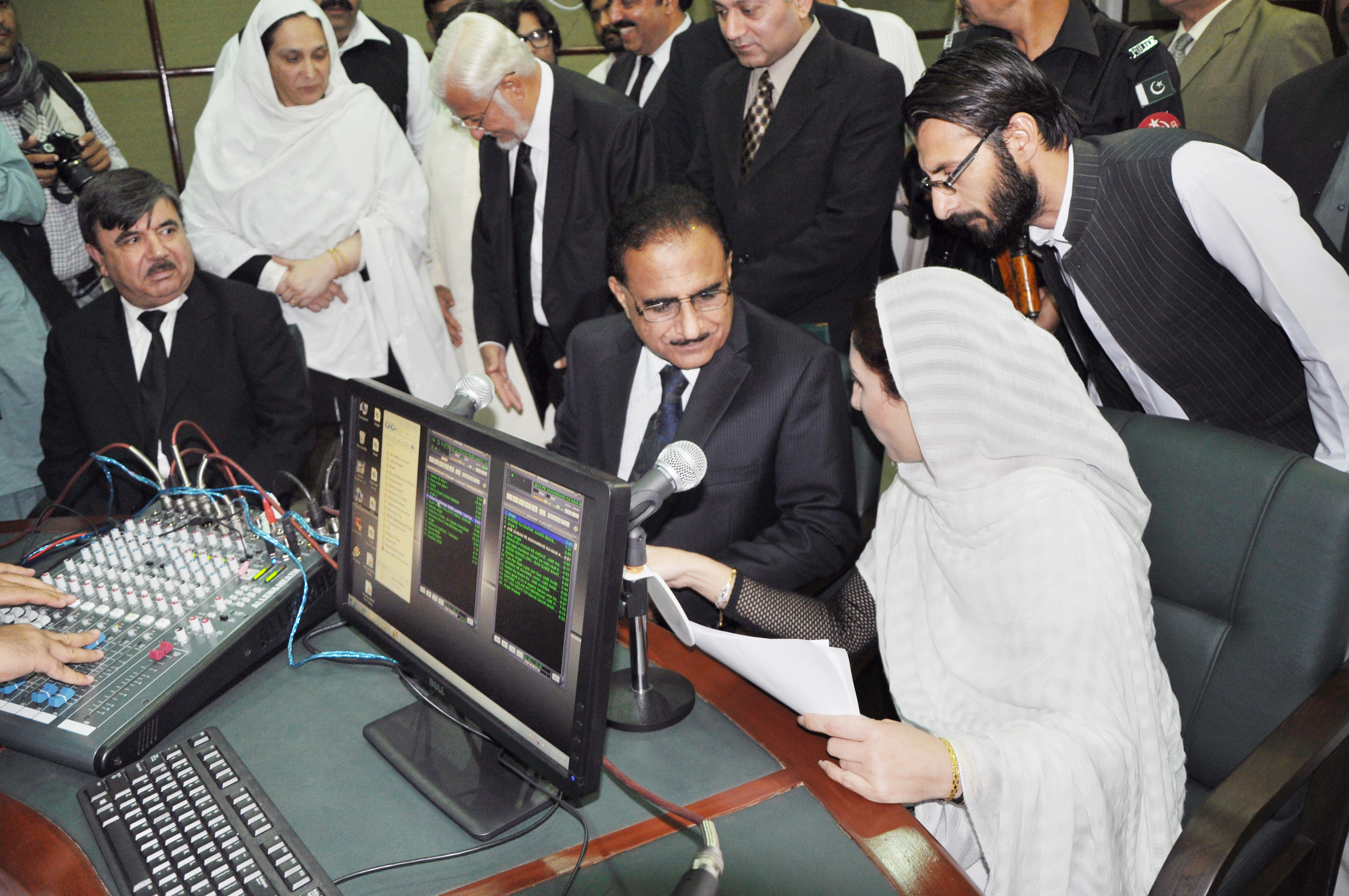
Radio Meezan inauguration, 20 March 2013

Radio Meezan is one of Pakistan's first legal-awareness radio stations, broadcasting programs on legal awareness, human rights and children's and women's rights. Its purpose is to provide information, education, awareness, sensitization, advice, drama, public-service announcements and special programming on national and international days. The station's policy is to maintain high standards of accuracy, objectivity, balance, simplicity and decency in its broadcasts, focusing on issues related to law and justice in society. Radio Meezan encourages contributions from all, from public officials and lawyers to ordinary citizens.

== Mediation Center ==
The academy established a mediation center, the first of its kind in the country, to resolve disputes using alternative methods. The center is supported by the United Nations Development Programme.

== Information Technology ==
The academy is equipped with information-technology tools and strategies to enhance their participants' learning experience. The ICT department developed and maintains the following:

- Paperless Office
- Academy and Radio Meezan websites
- Online evaluation forms, using Google for Education
- Management of Google apps, the network, work stations and firewalls
- Payroll, library-information, assets-tracking, bio-metric-attendance, file-tracking and training-information-management systems
- Smart Interactive Boards
- Video Conferencing via PolyCom and Zoom.
- Management of CCTV System

== Academic Links ==
The academy signed memoranda of understanding with the Punjab Judicial Academy, Sindh Judicial Academy, Balochistan Judicial Academy, National Institute of Management, Lahore, Shari'a academy, International Islamic University, Islamabad, University of Malakand, Hazara University and Abdul Wali Khan University Mardan to share best practices and support each other academically, particularly in legal education. The Institute of Management Sciences in Peshawar is also working with the academy to develop curricula and assess training needs.

== Director General ==
Currently the KP judicial academy is headed by Director General, Mr. Kalim Arshad Khan, {District & Sessions Judge}.
Former Director Generals

- Mr. Jehanzeb Shinwari, {District & Sessions Judge},
- Ms. Farah Jamshed {District & Sessions Judge},
- Zia- ud- din Khattak, {District & Sessions Judge (Retired)},
- Mr. Muhammad Bashir (Retired District & Sessions Judge) 20-03-2019 to 20-03-2020.
- Mr. Fazal Subhan (District & Sessions Judge), October 9, 2018 to March 20, 2019.
- Dr. Khurshid Iqbal (District and Session Judge), December 27, 2017 to October 8, 2018.
- Khawaja Wajihuddin (District and Session Judge, Additional Charge), November 11, 2017 to December 27, 2017.
- Mr. Muhammad Masood Khan (District & Sessions Judge), January 12, 2017 to November 20, 2017.
- Zia- ud- din Khattak, {District & Sessions Judge (Retired)}, May 2, 2015 to January 9, 2017.
- Hayat Ali Shah, one of the founding father of the academy, who developed the academy into its current form, worked as Director General from February 1, 2012, until March 31, 2015.

== Dean Faculty ==
- Mr. Ahmed Iftikhar (District & Sessions Judge) is the current Dean Faculty.

The list of former Deans:

- Mr. Zia ur Rehman (District & Sessions Judge)
- Mr. Muhammad Shoaib (District & Sessions Judge)
- Ms. Farah Jamshed (District & Sessions Judge)
- Syed Kamal Hussain Shah (District & Sessions Judge)
- Mr. Sohail Sheraz Noor Sani (District & Sessions Judge)
- Syed Anees Badshah Bukhari (District & Sessions Judge)
- Khawaja Wajihuddin (District & Sessions Judge)
- Dr. Khursheed Iqbal (District & Sessions Judge)

== See also ==
- Federal Judicial Academy
- Punjab Judicial Academy
- Balochistan Judicial Academy
- Sindh Judicial Academy
- Gilgit-Baltistan Judicial Academy
