= Balochistan High Court =

Provincial high court in Pakistan

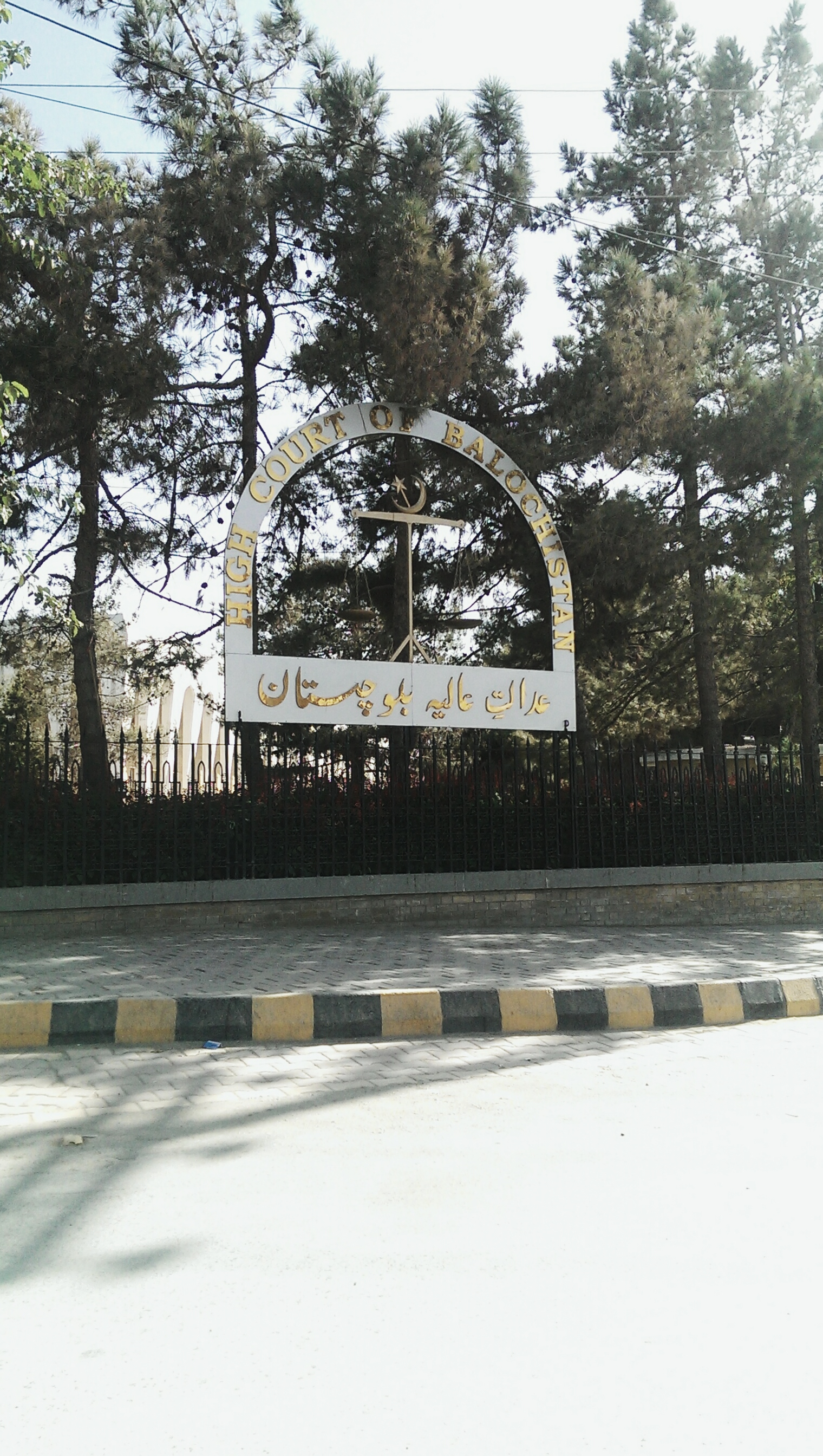
- A corner view of the Balochistan High Court building
- Interactive map of Balochistan High Court
- Established: 1 December 1976; 49 years ago
- Jurisdiction: Balochistan
- Location: Principal Seat: Quetta; Circuit Benches: Sibi & Turbat
- Composition method: Appointment by President on Judicial Commission recommendation.
- Authorised by: Constitution of Pakistan
- Appeals to: Supreme Court of Pakistan
- Appeals from: District Courts of Balochistan
- Judge term length: Till 62 years of age
- Number of positions: 15
- Website: bhc.gov.pk

Acting Chief Judge
- Currently: Justice Muhammad Kamran Khan Malakhail
- Since: November 2025

The Balochistan High Court (Urdu: عدالتِ عالیہ بلوچستان; Balochi: آمید گس بلوچستان; Pashto: د بلوچستان عالي محکمه; Dari: دادگاه عالی بلوچستان) is the highest judicial institution of Balochistan, Pakistan. The court is formally known as the High Court of Balochistan. It is situated in the provincial capital, Quetta.

Mir Ali Dost Bugti was the first judge of the Balochistan High Court. Justice Muhammad Kamran Khan Malakhail is the current Chief Justice, having taken charge on 6 June 2025.

== Bar Council ==
The Balochistan Bar Council is a statutory & deliberative assembly of lawyers in Balochistan for safeguarding the rights, interests, and privileges of practicing lawyers within Balochistan province, Pakistan. The Council also regulates the conduct of lawyers and helps in the administration of justice. It has been constituted by Section 3(ii) of the Legal Practitioners and Bar Councils Act, 1973 of the constitution of Pakistan. All lower court and High Court lawyers within Balochistan are licensed with this council. The Balochistan Bar Council consists of a Vice Chairman, & Chairman Executive Committee, both elected by Members of the Balochistan Bar Council each year and these Members are elected by the advocates from four (04) Groups of different constituencies across Balochistan Province. Members serve a term of five years, beginning on 1 January, with elections held each November to fill seats of those whose terms will expire in the following January. The Advocate General of Balochistan acts as ex-officio Chairman of the Balochistan Bar Council.

== Justices of the Balochistan High Court ==
The Balochistan High Court is headed by a Chief Justice. The bench consists of Justices and additional judges. The retirement age of the Chief Justice and the Justices is 62 years. The Additional Judges are initially appointed for one year. After that, their services could either be extended in an additional capacity, or they could be confirmed or retired.

=== Current composition ===
The High Court of Balochistan is currently made up of the following Justices (in order of seniority). In January 2018, the President of Pakistan increased the number of judges from eleven to fifteen.

No.	Name	Appointment	Retirement	Note(s)
1	Muhammad Kamran Khan Mulakhail	30 August 2013	18 January 2030	Chief Justice since 15 November 2025
2	Shaukat Ali Rakhshani	7 July 2022	3 August 2031	Senior Puisne Judge since 16 August 2026
3	Gul Hassan Tareen	7 July 2022	23 June 2036	
4	Muhammad Aamir Nawaz Rana	7 July 2022	20 November 2036	
5	Sardar Ahmed Haleemi	7 July 2022	11 February 2037	
6	Najam-ud-Din Mengal	20 January 2025	31 December 2041	
7	Muhammad Rauf Atta	11 August 2026	30 November 2031	Additional judge, subject to confirmation
8	Allah Dad Roshan	11 August 2026	6 July 2032	Additional judge, subject to confirmation
9	Abdul Qayyum Lehri	11 August 2026	20 February 2038	Additional judge, subject to confirmation
10	Vacant			
11	Vacant			
12	Vacant			
13	Vacant			
14	Vacant			
15	Vacant			

=== PCO 25 March 1981 ===
- Khuda Bakhsh Marri: Did not take oath under the Provisional Constitutional Order, being the chief justice
- Zakaullah Lodhi: Took oath under PCO to become the chief justice
- Abdul Qadeer Chaudhri Took oath under PCO (on requests of fellow lawmakers and jurists)
- Mir Hazar Khan Khoso Took oath under PCO
- M.A. Rasheed also did not take oath under PCO

=== PCO 26 January 2000 ===
- Iftikhar Muhammad Chaudhry Took oath under PCO, was chief justice
- Javed Iqbal Took oath under PCO
- Raja Fayaz Ahmed Took oath under PCO
- Amanullah Khan Yasinzai Took oath under PCO
- Fazal ur Rehman Took oath under PCO

=== PCO 3 November 2007 ===
- Amanullah Khan Yasinzai took oath under PCO, was chief justice
- Ahmed Khan Lashari took oath under PCO
- Akhtar Zaman Malghani took oath under PCO
- Nadir Khan Durani took oath under PCO
- Mehta Kelash Nath took oath under PCO

=== List of retired judges ===
- Khuda Bakhsh Marri 21-10-1970 25-03-1981
- Abdul Hayee Qureshi 07-02-1972 23-07-1978
- Mushtak Ali Kazi 18-09-1973 to 20-12-1979
- M.A Rasheed 08-10-1977 18-09-1978
- Zakaullah Lodhi 01-12-1976 19-10-1984
- Mir Hazar Khan Khoso 20-06-1977 29-09-1991
- Abdul Qadeer Chaudhary 20-06-1977 13-12-1989
- Muhammad Jaffar Naim 14-05-1981 23-02-1985
- Muftikhar-ud-Din 22-05-1982 09-03-1990
- Ajmal Mian 17-03-1980 29-03-1987
- Munawar Ahmed Mirza 31-03-1985 16-11-1996
- Nazir Ahmed Bhatti 03-04-1985 07-09-1987
- Amir-ul-Mulk Mengal 26-03-1986 22-04-1999
- Iftikhar Muhammad Chaudhary 06-04-1990 04-02-2000
- Muhammad Nawaz Marri 07-03-1996 07-01-2000
- Javed Iqbal 07-03-1996 28-04-2000
- Raja Fayyaz Ahmed 27-01-1997 14-09-2005
- Amanullah Khan 27-01-1997 5-08-2009
- Fazal-ur-Rahman 21.06.1999 12-04-2005
- Ahmed Khan Lashari 06-09-2000 5-08-2009
- Tariq Mehmood 06-09-2000 16-04-2002
- Akhtar Zaman 05-09-2002 5-08-2009
- Nadir Khan 05-09-2002 5-08-2009
- Kelash Nath 26-11-2004 5-08-2009

== See also ==
- Balochistan Judicial Academy
- Balochistan Bar Council
- Sindh High Court
- Lahore High Court
- Peshawer High Court
- Islamabad High Court
- Supreme Court of Pakistan
