= Gilgit-Baltistan Judicial Academy =

Agency overview
- Formed: 2021; 5 years ago
- Jurisdiction: Gilgit-Baltistan
- Parent agency: Government of Gilgit-Baltistan
- Key document: Gilgit-Baltistan judicial act, 2021
- Website: www.gbcc.gov.pk

The Gilgit-Baltistan Judicial Academy is an agency of the Government of Gilgit-Baltistan in Gilgit for legal training established in 2021. The Academy provides pre-service and in-service training to the judicial officers and court personnel. The administration of the academy is managed by a board under the leadership of the Chief Justice of Gilgit-Baltistan Chief Court and an appointed Director-General.

== See also ==
- Gilgit-Baltistan Chief Court
- Supreme Appellate Court Gilgit-Baltistan
- Federal Judicial Academy
- Khyber Pakhtunkhwa Judicial Academy
- Punjab Judicial Academy
- Balochistan Judicial Academy
- Sindh Judicial Academy
