= Balochistan Judicial Academy =

Government Judicial Agency of Balochistan

- اکادمی عدالتی بلوچستان اکیڈمی عدلیہ بلوچستان د بلوچستان قضايي اکاډمي اکادمی قضایی بلوچستان

Agency overview
- Formed: 2010; 16 years ago
- Jurisdiction: Balochistan
- Parent agency: Government of Balochistan
- Key document: Balochistan Judicial Academy Act 2010
- Website: www.bhc.gov.pk

The Balochistan Judicial Academy is an agency for legal training of judicial officers of the Government of Balochistan, Pakistan. Based in Quetta, the academy was established in 2010 under the Balochistan Judicial Academy Act 2010, passed by Balochistan Assembly. The academy provides pre-service and in-service training to the judicial officers and court personnel. The management and administration of the academy are run by the board under leadership of the Chief Justice of Balochistan High Court and a Director-General.

== See also ==
- Federal Judicial Academy
- Khyber Pakhtunkhwa Judicial Academy
- Punjab Judicial Academy
- Sindh Judicial Academy
- Gilgit-Baltistan Judicial Academy
