= Refresher training =

Training to update existing skills and knowledge

Refresher training is an aspect of retraining taken by a person already qualified or previously assessed as competent in a field with the intention of updating skills and/or knowledge to a changed standard, or providing the opportunity to ensure that no important skills or knowledge have been lost due to lack of use. In industry it is also used to upgrade performance of personnel faced with workplace changes or who use obsolete, deprecated, or outdated work procedures, as a method for improving productivity, customer service, employee satisfaction and retention, and workplace health and safety.

== Fields of application ==
- Airline pilots
- General commerce and industry
- Military reserve personnel
- Medical specialists
- Paramedic and first aid responders
- Rescue and emergency response personnel
- Teachers
- Underwater diving
  - Professional diving – First aid qualifications required for members of a professional diving team are generally valid for a limited period in the order of two or three years, and must be revalidated by a refresher course for the diver to remain "in date".
  - Recreational diving – A scuba refresher course is a voluntary training intervention which mainly targets the autonomous diver, which is the certification level most likely to be associated with inactive recreational divers, and which includes the most basic knowledge and skills. The Professional Association of Diving Instructors (PADI) course is called ReActivate, and Scuba Schools International (SSI) offers a similar course named Scuba Skills Update. They include a theory component which can be done on-line, and a practical skills component that can be done under the supervision of a divemaster or instructor, and starts with checkout of setting up the scuba equipment and water entry techniques, and continues with assessing critical skills like mask recovery and clearing, neutral buoyancy, ditching weights and ascent using an alternative air source. PADI suggest a refresher after six months inactivity, but the actual need depends on the previous experience and skill of the diver.

== Training methods ==
In the simplest case, the candidate will demonstrate skills in a real or simulated exercise, and may be required to also pass a written or oral examination. Where standards have changed it is likely that there will be a formal or informal intervention to present the updated information, demonstrate updated procedures and learn the details of new equipment, and an opportunity to discuss and practice skills before assessment.

== Need ==
A safety culture survey or audit may indicate that safe practices are not sufficiently implemented, and may indicate a need for specific or general refresher training, or the personnel may indicate that they feel a need for it. An accident or near miss often points to a deficiency in a safety program, as unsafe practices are more often the consequence of inadequate knowledge and understanding than intentional contraventions by employees, who generally prefer to avoid being injured.

== Frequency ==
In some cases the frequency of refresher training is mandated by regulation or an expiry date on the certification. This is often the case for occupational safety related competences. These are often valid for periods of two or three years.

== Common subjects in industry and commerce ==
- Occupational safety and health
  - Occupational noise exposure
  - Hazardous waste operations and emergency response
  - Respiratory protection
  - Exit routes, emergency action and fire prevention plans
  - Asbestos work
  - Bloodborne pathogens
  - Toxic materials
- Workplace prejudice and harassment
- Cyber-security
- Customer service
- Legal compliance

== See also ==
- Adult education – Any form of learning adults engage in beyond traditional schooling
- Induction training – A form of introduction to an organisation for new employees
- Professional development – Learning to earn or maintain professional credentials
- Retraining – The process of learning a new or upgrading an old skill set or trade
