= Federal Judicial Academy =

Judicial training wing of Pakistan

- اکادمی وفاقی عدالتی

Agency overview
- Formed: 1988; 38 years ago
- Jurisdiction: Pakistan
- Parent agency: Government of Pakistan
- Key document: Federal Judicial Academy Act, 1997
- Website: www.fja.gov.pk

The Federal Judicial Academy is an agency for legal training run by Government of Pakistan in Islamabad. The Academy was established in 1988 under the Federal Judicial Academy Act, 1997. The academy offers training for judicial officers (judges and magistrates) and court personnel.

== Management ==
The affairs of the academy are supervised by a Board of Governors, which is headed by the Chief Justice of Pakistan. Other members are Chief Justices of high courts, Minister and Secretary of Law and Justice Ministry, Attorney General for Pakistan and a Director-General. The latter looks after the agency's day-to-day affairs.

== See also ==
- Supreme Court of Pakistan
- Khyber Pakhtunkhwa Judicial Academy
- Punjab Judicial Academy
- Balochistan Judicial Academy
- Sindh Judicial Academy
- Gilgit-Baltistan Judicial Academy
