= 1952 in Pakistan =

- Decades: 1940s; 1950s; 1960s; 1970s
- See also: History of Pakistan; List of years in Pakistan; Timeline of Pakistani history

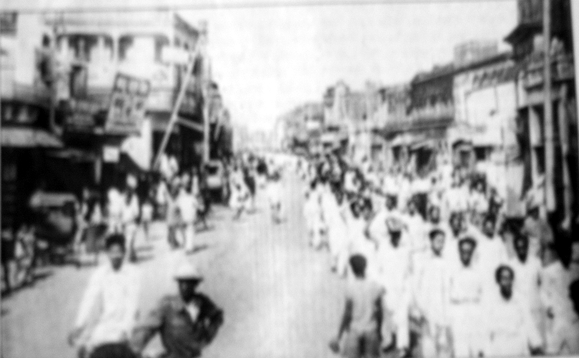
4 February 1952 rally at Nowab Pure Road, Dhaka, East Pakistan

Events from the year 1952 in Pakistan.

== Incumbents ==
=== Monarch ===
- King George VI (consort – Queen Elizabeth) until 6 February
- Queen Elizabeth II (consort – Prince Philip) from 6 February

=== Federal government ===
- Governor-General – Malik Ghulam Muhammad
- Prime Minister – Khawaja Nazimuddin
- Chief Justice: Abdul Rashid

=== Governors ===
- Governor of Northwest Frontier: Khwaja Shahabuddin
- Governor of West Punjab: Abdur Rab Nishtar
- Governor of Sindh: Mian Aminuddin

== Events ==
=== January–March ===
- 26 January – At the Dhaka session of the ruling Muslim League party, prime minister Khawaja Nazimuddin declares Urdu the national language of the state of Pakistan.
- 30 January – The Awami League holds a secret meeting, attended by a number of members from the communist front mobilising full political and student support.
- 6 February- George VI, King of Pakistan, dies at Sandringham House aged 56. Queen Elizabeth II becomes Queen of Pakistan
- 20 February – Section 144 of the Code of Criminal Procedure, 1898, prohibiting processions and meetings is promulgated in Dhaka.
- 21 February – The first ethnic riots occur in Dhaka, East Pakistan against attempts to make Urdu the national language and lack of representation for Bengalis in central administration. This marks the start of the political struggle for the Bengali language movement.

=== April–June ===
- 15 May – Conference is held amongst delegates from India and Pakistan in Karachi to consider implementation of a visa and passport system between the two countries.

=== July–September ===
- 14 August – Pakistan celebrates 5 years of independence.

=== October–December ===
- 23 November – Basic Principles Committee (BPC) presents the second revised report to the Constituent Assembly. The report called for a parity of representation between East and West Pakistan in parliament elected on the basis of separate balloting for minorities.

== Births ==
=== January–June ===
- 1 February – ACM Tanvir Mahmood Ahmed, Pakistan's air chief from 2006 to 2009
- 4 March – Salman Bashir, retired diplomat and former Foreign Secretary
- 13 March – Dr Tahir Amin, political scientist, educator and chairman of National Institute of Pakistan Studies at Quaid-i-Azam University, Islamabad
- 17 March – Abid Ali, television actor

=== July–December ===
- 15 July – Raisul Islam Asad, Bangladeshi actor
- 1 September – Lt Gen Masood Aslam, statesman and Pakistan's ambassador to Mexico
- 9 September – Zaka Ashraf, banker and former chairman of the Pakistan Cricket Board
- 5 October – Imran Khan, cricketer and prime minister
- 11 November – Shamim Azad, poet, storyteller and writer
- 16 November – Abid Azad poet, critic and literary editor (died 2005)
- 21 November – Papia Sarwar, Bangladeshi singer (died 2024)
- 9 December – Liaqat Baloch, political leader

=== Full date unknown ===
- Lt Gen A. T. M. Zahirul Alam, force commander of the United Nations Mission in Liberia

== Deaths ==
- Ahmed Ullah Ajmeri, film director
- 7 January – Ustad Jhande Khan, music composer and director
- 16 April – Arzoo Lucknowi, Urdu poet
- 1 August – Jamshed Nusserwanjee Mehta, first and longest-serving mayor of Karachi (b. 1886)
- 16 October – Ghulam Bhik Nairang, Indian/Pakistani Muslim leader, poet (b. 1876)

== See also ==
- List of Pakistani films of 1952
