= Pakistan Council of Scientific & Industrial Research =

Govt. of Pakistan agency for Scientific & Industrial R&D.

- شورای تحقیقات علمی و صنعتی پاکستان
- Seal of the Government of Pakistan

Agency overview
- Formed: 1953; 73 years ago
- Type: Regulatory
- Jurisdiction: Government of Pakistan
- Headquarters: Islamabad, Pakistan
- Motto: Committed to Excellence
- Annual budget: FY-26 federal budget
- Agency executive: Dr. S. Hussain Abidi, S.I. Chairman
- Parent agency: Ministry of Science & Technology
- Key document: PCSIR Act of 1973
- Website: www.pcsir.gov.pk

The Pakistan Council of Scientific & Industrial Research (PCSIR) is an independent federal agency under the Ministry of Science and Technology (MOST) whose mission is to promote Pakistan's innovation, economic uplift, promotion of science, and the industrial competitiveness.

The PCSIR is organized into biological and physical sciences laboratories program that includes research in polymer science, engineering, metallurgy, chemicals, food, petroleum, leather, environmental, and ocean sciences.

== History ==
After the partition of the British India by the United Kingdom in 1947, the Indian government refused the transfer of the Indian Council of Scientific and Industrial Research laboratories to Pakistan as many were well established in India. Furthermore, there was a strong lack of education (with widespread illiteracy in the nation), lack of vision about the education, myopic bureaucracy, and the lack scientific awareness during the formative years of Pakistan and its turbulent nature of its emergence critically influenced and felt the scientific development of Pakistan at the highest government level. Realizing this prompt reality in 1948, Prime Minister Liaquat Ali Khan to write a letter of request to his Indian counterpart, Jawaharlal Nehru, to at least allow the immigration of Indian Muslims scientists to Pakistan.

Among them was Salimuzzaman Siddiqui, a chemist with the PhD from Germany, who was the director of one of Indian CRSI laboratories and emigrated to Pakistan and established the Pakistan Department of Research at the University of Karachi in 1951. In 1953, the department was finally reformulated and established as the "Pakistan Council of Scientific & Industrial Research" with S. Siddiqui being its first chief scientist. Originally, it mission was to promote the cause of "Science" and its objectives were codified in Societies Act by the Government of Pakistan.

Establishment of the PCSIR allowed many scientists in the country to permanently seek stable employment with the government. Between 1953–56, the PCSIR expanded its scientific scope by promoting education on science and established its regional head offices with laboratories first in Karachi, Lahore, Peshawar, Quetta, and followed by in East Pakistan, including in Dhaka, Rajshahi, and Chittagong which were later evolved into the Bangladesh Council of Scientific and Industrial Research in 1973.

During its formative years, the PCSIR was strongly encouraged and moved towards advancing the field of organic chemistry and molecular biology for medicinal benefits of the country. In 1965, the PCSIR's mission moved towards offering services in electrical and mechanical engineering disciplines when it found funding and guidance from the Pakistan Armed Forces.

In 1973, the mandate and the agency's mission was codified by the parliamentary legislation and its status granted as independent agency under the Ministry of Science and Technology in 1984.

== Units ==
=== Laboratories complexes ===
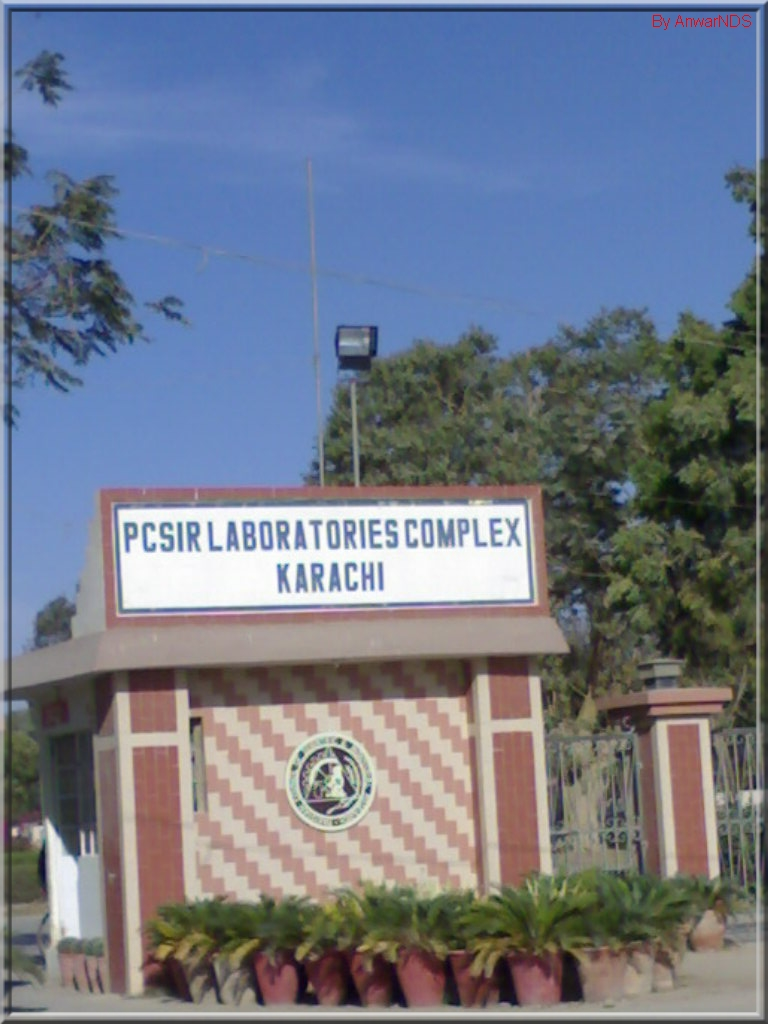
The main entrance of the PCSIR Laboratories Complex, Karachi in 2010.

The PCSIR has six laboratory complexes in the country who engaged in testing analysis of the structural engineering, ocean sciences, life sciences, healthcare including medical diagnostics, metallurgy, chemicals and their safety, mining, petroleum, food, leather, and environmental science.

In 1953, the PCSIR Karachi Laboratories Complex was established near the University of Karachi that engaged in studying the biological sciences for medicinal benefits, computer and the physical sciences to provide service to the nation.

In 1955, the agency established the PCSIR Laboratories Complex, Peshawar with a view to investigate raw material resources of the region and assist in the industrial development of the country. In 1956, the PCSIR Laboratories Complex, Lahore was established at the vicinity of the University of Punjab whose mission scope is very similar to its sister site in Karachi.

In 1985, the PCSIR Laboratories Complex, Hyderabad was established to provide better research coordination with the University of Sindh, which is in Hyderabad. In 1997, the agency then moved forward towards establishing the PCSIR Laboratories Complex, Skardu to help benefit the local community to impart training to local people in the field of processing and preservation of fruits and vegetables.

In 2004, the PCSIR Laboratories Complex, Quetta was established that currently works on the food technology and reprocessing. In 2022, the PCSIR Laboratories Complex, Islamabad was established to study the microbiology and environmental sciences when the proposal was put forward.

The PCSIR Laboratories Complexes are organized in two category with Karachi, Lahore, Peshwar and Quetta complexes are classified as "Multifunctional Laboratories" while the Islamabad and Skardu complexes are classified as "Monofunctional Laboratories".

=== HRD Centers ===
The PCSIR provides fundings through scholarships in training, education, and subsequently awarding degrees as its wider scope to promote the promotion of science and technology through its HRD Centers, which are thought to be acronym of "Human Resource Development". In 1965, the PCSIR reached out to the Switzerland to help develop the specialized technical degree programs (B.Tech.) in machining and instrumentation, which saw the establishment of the Pak-Swiss Training Centre, Karachi.

Established through the Swiss Foundation for Technical Cooperation, the Pak-Swiss Training Centres have been established in Quetta, Peshawar, Lahore, and Gwadar, that has been instrumental specially in boosting automotive industry and thus has contributed to national GDP. Furthermore, PCSIR also operates and funds the "Precision Systems Training Centre" in Lahore, Quetta, and Peshawar that has the same educational program while offering with same diplomas, which is seen as critical and practical training vital for technological development, sustained growth of economy and poverty alleviation.

In 1989, the PCSIR in collaboration with Swiss Foundation for Technical Cooperation established the Institute of Industrial Electronics Engineering (IIEE) to provide education, training, and degrees in industrial electronics and industrial computing with a partnership with NED University in Karachi.

In 2005, the PCSIR founded and established the "Cast Metals & Foundry Technology Centre" in Daska in a view of providing the technical manpower and support to nation's all engineering industries especially the casting and metal industry.

== Testing for consumer safety ==
In January 2017, the council conducted tests on 16 brands of packaged milk in the interest of public safety and found that only 6 of 16 brands were safe for public consumption. This report was presented to the National Assembly of Pakistan.

== See also ==
- Higher Education Commission of Pakistan
- Pakistan Academy of Sciences
- Pakistan Educational Research Network
