= 1949 in Pakistan =

- Decades: 1940s; 1950s; 1960s
- See also: History of Pakistan; List of years in Pakistan; Timeline of Pakistani history

Events from the year 1949 in Pakistan.

== Incumbents ==
=== Monarch ===
- King George VI (consort – Queen Elizabeth)

=== Federal government ===
- Governor-General: Khawaja Nazimuddin
- Prime Minister: Liaquat Ali Khan
- Chief Justice: Abdul Rashid (starting 27 June)

=== Governors ===
- Governor of Northwest Frontier: Ambrose Dundas Flux Dundas (until 19 July); Sahibzada Mohammad Khurshid (starting 19 July)
- Governor of West Punjab: Francis Mudie (until 2 August); Abdur Rab Nishtar (starting 2 August)
- Governor of Sindh: Shaikh Din Muhammad (until 19 November); Mian Aminuddin (starting 19 November)

== Events ==
=== January ===
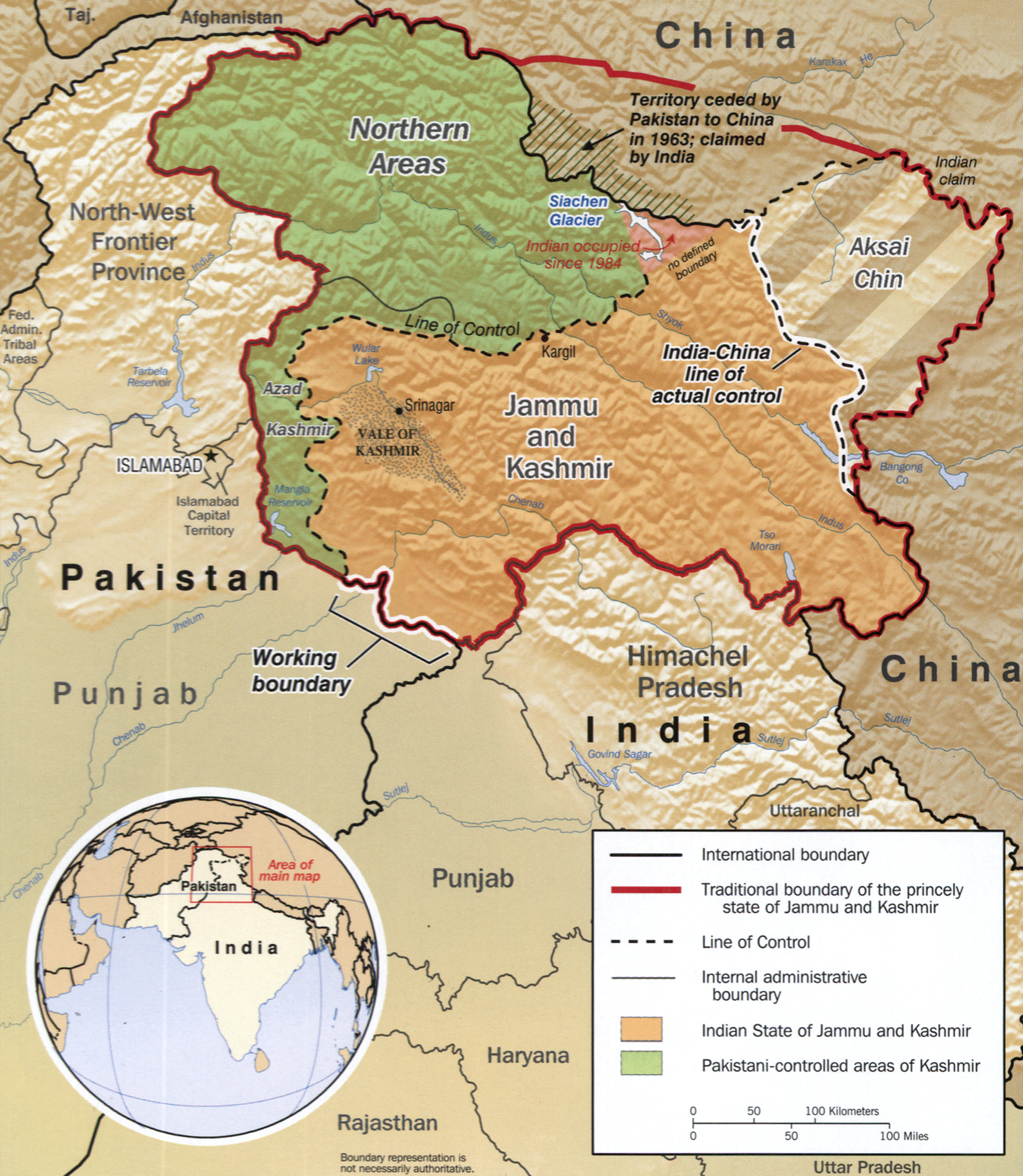
Map of the disputed region

- 1 January – The UN brokered a cease-fire in Kashmir. It granted Kashmir the right to vote on whether to join Pakistan or India.

=== March ===
- March – Pakistan and India sign the Karachi Agreement
- 7 March – Prime Minister Liaquat Ali Khan presented Objectives Resolution in the assembly.
- 12 March – Objectives Resolution is adopted by Constituent Assembly of Pakistan.

=== April ===
- 26 April – 1949 Tangail South by-election in East Bengal.

== Births ==
- 6 March – Shaukat Aziz, former prime minister
- 15 September – Taskeen Manerwal, poet and writer (d. 2022)
- 20 November – Tarek Fatah, journalist (d. 2023 in Canada)
- 25 December – Nawaz Sharif, former prime minister

== Deaths ==
- 19 June – Syed Zafarul Hasan, Muslim philosopher (b. 1885)

== See also ==
- List of Pakistani films before 1950
