= 1951 in Pakistan =

- Decades: 1940s; 1950s; 1960s; 1970s
- See also: History of Pakistan; List of years in Pakistan; Timeline of Pakistani history

Events from the year 1951 in Pakistan.

== Incumbents ==
=== Monarch ===
- King George VI (consort – Queen Elizabeth)

=== Federal government ===
- Governor-General – Khawaja Nazimuddin (until 17 October), Malik Ghulam Muhammad (starting 19 October)
- Prime Minister – Liaquat Ali Khan (until 16 October), Khawaja Nazimuddin (starting 17 October)
- Chief Justice: Abdul Rashid

=== Governors ===
- Governor of Northwest Frontier: Ismail Ibrahim Chundrigar (until 24 November); Khwaja Shahabuddin (starting 24 November)
- Governor of West Punjab: Abdur Rab Nishtar
- Governor of Sindh: Mian Aminuddin

== Events ==
=== January–March ===
- 12 January – Republic of Finland opens its embassy in Pakistan to usher bilateral relations and co-operation in national security and economic development.
- 17 January – General Ayub Khan becomes the first non-British Chief of the Army Staff of Pakistan when he replaces General Sir Douglas David Gracey as commander-in-chief.
- 9 to 12 February – The fourth edition of the World Muslim Congress takes place in Karachi.
- 23 February – Eleven military officers including Major General Akbar Khan and four civilians including prominent poet Faiz Ahmad Faiz and Communist Party of Pakistan leaders Syed Sajjad Zaheer and Muhammad Hussain Ata organise a plot to attempt a coup d'état against the government of Pakistan. This came to be known as the Rawalpindi conspiracy.
- 26 February – A second trade treaty is drafted and implemented by India and Pakistan broadening the scope of exports between the two countries.
- 28 February – Pakistan's first recorded census after gaining its independence from British India concludes.
- 9 March – Prime Minister Liaquat Ali Khan announced the foiling of the Rawalpindi conspiracy coup and the conspirators were exposed.

=== April–June ===
- 5 April – Muslim League leader Mumtaz Daultana takes oath as the second Chief Minister of Punjab amidst allegations of rigging while Iftikhar Mamdot leads the opposition.
- 13 April – The Pakistan Citizenship Act 1951 comes into effect, which referred to ways in which a person could gain, lose or deny Pakistani citizenship.
- 15 June – A special tribunal was formed to preside over the proceedings of the Rawalpindi Conspiracy Case at the Hyderabad Jail.
- 17 June – The first agreement between United Nations Food and Agriculture Organization and the government of Pakistan is signed for the provision of technical assistance in agricultural policy and planning formulation.

=== July–September ===
- 11 September – Fatima Jinnah's speech broadcast on the second death anniversary of the Quaid-e-Azam Muhammad Ali Jinnah was censored through tampering by the radio authorities, with the microphones going silent for a few minutes when she was critical of the governmental policies.
- 24 September – At the behest of the Ministry of Information, Broadcasting and National Heritage, Fatima Jinnah's original speech gets re-broadcast in light of public outcry against censorship.

=== October–December ===
- 1 October – Pakistan Standard Time (UTC+05:00) is introduced and implemented following the findings of mathematician Prof Mahmood Anwar. The country had been using the Indian Standard Time as the time standard until then.
- 16 October – Prime Minister Liaquat Ali Khan is assassinated at Company Bagh (now renamed Liaquat National Bagh) in Rawalpindi, Punjab.
- 17 October – Governor-General Khawaja Nazimuddin becomes the second prime minister of Pakistan making him the first Bengali prime minister.
- 22 November – Rawalpindi Conspiracy trial concluded and the verdict was announced the following year in January.

== Births ==
- 1 January – Ashfaq Hussain, Pakistani-Canadian poet and journalist
- 19 August – Attaullah Khan Esakhelvi, Pride of Performance Award-winning musician.
- 6 September – Samiullah Khan, national field hockey player.
- 7 September – Syed Salman Gilani, poet and writer (d. 2026)
- 13 November – Aasia Begum, actress.
- 15 November – Alamgir Hashmi, poet and writer.
- Khalid Khawaja, Squadron leader of the Pakistan Air Force and a veteran of the Soviet–Afghan War.

== Deaths ==
- 11 December – Munawwar Ali, politician (birth 1884)

== See also ==
- List of Pakistani films of 1951
