= 1948 in Pakistan =

- Decades: 1940s; 1950s; 1960s
- See also: History of Pakistan; List of years in Pakistan; Timeline of Pakistani history

Events from the year 1948 in Pakistan.

== Incumbents ==
=== Monarch ===
- King George VI (consort – Queen Elizabeth)

=== Federal government ===
- Governor-General: Muhammad Ali Jinnah (until 11 September), Khawaja Nazimuddin (starting 11 September)
- Prime Minister: Liaquat Ali Khan

=== Governors ===
- Governor of Northwest Frontier: George Cunningham (until 19 April); Ambrose Dundas Flux Dundas (starting 19 April)
- Governor of West Punjab: Francis Mudie
- Governor of Sindh: Shaikh G.H. Hidayatullah (until 7 October); Shaikh Din Muhammad (starting 7 October)

== Events ==
=== January ===
- Widespread violence and massacres of Muslims, Hindus and Sikhs
- Nearly 10 million people migrate to Pakistan and India. Muslims immigrate to Pakistan while Hindus and Sikhs immigrate to India.

=== February ===
- 24, Referendum approves Junagadh's accession to India.
- 25, Junagadh's Accession to India in effect.

=== May ===
- 1, Pakistan and India went to war over Kashmir region. The Pakistani-captured one-third was known as Azad Jammu and Kashmir, while India occupied the eastern two-thirds now called Jammu and Kashmir

=== July ===
- 30, Fatima Jinnah is aware of her birthday, and is observed for the first time, since independence; the nation refers her to the titles of "Mother of the Nation" and Khatoon-I-Pakistan.

=== September ===
- 11 September - Founder and the First Governor General of Pakistan Muhammad Ali Jinnah died in Karachi, at the age of 71.

=== Date unknown ===
- The Government Institute of Arts and Crafts (later known as the Faculty of Fine Arts, University of Dhaka) opens in Dacca.
- Call Ready is established in Sutrapur Thana, Dacca to rent out lights, loudspeakers, and microphones for events.
- Waziristan rebellion (1948-1954) The Faqir of Ipi supported by Afghanistan took control of North Waziristan's Datta Khel area and declared the establishment of an independent Pashtunistan.

== See also ==
- List of Pakistani films before 1950
