= 1953 in Pakistan =

- Decades: 1940s; 1950s; 1960s; 1970s
- See also: History of Pakistan; List of years in Pakistan; Timeline of Pakistani history

Events from the year 1953 in Pakistan.

== Incumbents ==
=== Federal government ===
- Governor-General: Malik Ghulam Muhammad
- Prime Minister: Khawaja Nazimuddin (until 17 April), Muhammad Ali Bogra (starting 17 April)
- Chief Justice: Abdul Rashid

=== Governors ===
- Governor of Northwest Frontier: Khwaja Shahabuddin
- Governor of West Punjab: I. I. Chundrigar (until 2 May); Mian Aminuddin (starting 2 May)
- Governor of Sindh:
  - until 2 May: Mian Aminuddin
  - 2 May-12 August: George Baxandall Constantine
  - until 12 August: Habib Ibrahim Rahimtoola

== Events ==
- March 3 – CF-CUN, a de Havilland DH-106 Comet 1A of CPAL named Empress of Hawaii, crashed during takeoff from Karachi's Mauripur RAF Station during its delivery flight at 03:35 at 30 m (98 feet) elevation, killing all 11 occupants. The plane was headed to Singapore's Seletar Airport to be flown to Sydney for an inaugural flight to Honolulu on April 28. The crash was found to have been caused by the pilot, who had little experience with the Comet, taking off at night without obeying prescribed takeoff technique.
- April 17 – Governor General Ghulam Muhammad sacked Prime Minister Khawaja Nazimuddin, although he enjoyed the confidence of the parliament, and appointed Mohammad Ali Bogra to form a government on April 17.
- Martial law was imposed in Lahore to control the sectarian riots against the Ahmadiyya Muslim Community. This was the first sectarian rioting in the country and the Pakistan Army was called for the first time to control a civil strife.

== Births ==
- June 21 – Benazir Bhutto, politician and Prime Minister of Pakistan (died 2007)
- July 15 – Raisul Islam Asad, Bangladeshi actor
- October 26 – A. A. M. S. Arefin Siddique, Bangladeshi academic (died 2025)

== See also ==
- List of Pakistani films of 1953
