= 1954 in Pakistan =

- Decades: 1940s; 1950s; 1960s; 1970s
- See also: History of Pakistan; List of years in Pakistan; Timeline of Pakistani history

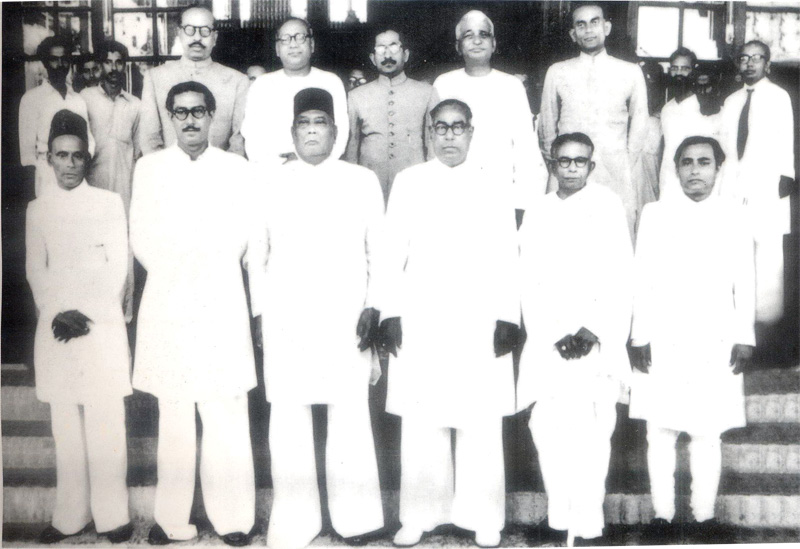

This is a list of notable events that took place in Pakistan in 1954.

== Incumbents ==
=== Federal government ===
- Governor-General: Malik Ghulam Muhammad
- Prime Minister: Muhammad Ali Bogra
- Chief Justice: Abdul Rashid (until 29 June), Muhammad Munir (starting 29 June)

=== Governors ===
- Governor of Northwest Frontier: Khwaja Shahabuddin (until 17 November); Qurban Ali Shah (starting 17 November)
- Governor of West Punjab:
  - until 24 June: Mian Aminuddin
  - 24 June-26 November: Habib Rahimtoola
  - starting 26 November: Mushtaq Ahmed Gurmani
- Governor of Sindh: Habib Ibrahim Rahimtoola (until 24 June); Iftikhar Hussain Khan Mamdot (starting 24 June)

== Events ==
=== April ===
- 2 April – Pakistan forms an alliance with Turkey which, although not including military cooperation, opens the way to the Middle-East alliance due to its allowance of the entry of other nations.

=== May ===
- 19 May – Pakistan and the United States sign a Mutual Defense Assistance Agreement.

=== September ===
- 29 September – the Governor-General of Pakistan, Ghulam Mohammad declared a state of emergency, dissolved the Constituent Assembly and appointed a new Council of Ministers on the grounds that the existing one no longer represented the people of Pakistan.

== Births ==
- 31 January - Imtiaz Dharker, poet and artist.
- 2 February - Moniza Alvi, writer and poet.
- 1 March - Tofail Ahmed, Bangladeshi public administration acacdemic (d. 2025)
- 18 October – Aamer Hameed, cricketer.

== See also ==
- List of Pakistani films of 1954
