= 1947 in Pakistan =

- Decades: 1940s; 1950s; 1960s
- See also: History of Pakistan; List of years in Pakistan; Timeline of Pakistani history

Events from the year 1947 in Pakistan.

== Incumbents ==
=== Federal government ===
- King of Pakistan: King George VI (starting 14 August)
- Governor-General: Muhammad Ali Jinnah (starting 14 August)
- Prime Minister: Liaquat Ali Khan (starting 15 August)

=== Governors ===
- Governor of the North West Frontier Province: Sir George Cunningham (starting 14 August)
- Governor of West Punjab: Sir Francis Mudie (starting 14 August)
- Governor of Sindh: Sir G.H. Hidayatullah (starting 14 August)

== Events ==
=== August ===
- Muhammad Ali Jinnah and his sister arrive on August 7, at the Mauripur Airport from New Delhi.
- Muslim member of the Partition Committee, Chaudhri Muhammad Ali comes to Karachi on August 9, for a one-day visit for Jinnah's approval on Patel's proposal for debt settlement. Liaquat Ali Khan asks Ali to convey to Lord Ismay in Delhi that Jinnah has received disturbing reports about the likely decision on the Punjab boundary Award.
- 14 August: The Dominion of Pakistan is declared an independent member state of the British Commonwealth.
- Mohammed Ali Jinnah became the first Governor-General of Pakistan and the Supreme Leader (Quaid-i-Azam) of the unified nation-state of Pakistan in August 1947.
- Liaquat Ali Khan becomes the first Prime Minister of Pakistan and Leader of the Pakistani Community also called Quaid-I-Millat (Leader of the Nation) in August 1947.
- Nearly 10 million people migrate to Pakistan and India. Muslims to Pakistan while Hindus and Sikhs to India.
- 18 August: The Nawab of Mohammad Mahabat Khanji III, ruler of the Princely state of Junagadh, a former British Protectorate since 1807 and the other small states of Bantva, Manavadar and Sardargadh, were also former British Protectorates since 1818 of the Kathiawar Peninsula despite an overall Hindu majority of the population all acceded to the Dominion of Pakistan, this was influenced by Shah Nawaz Bhutto the Dewan of the state. In response, the Dominion of India claimed that the accession was invalid, since the states were surrounded by India and demanded a plebiscite on the future of Junagadh and Manavadar (princely state). Pakistan agreed, on condition that votes also be held in Hyderabad State and Kashmir and Jammu; India rejected this proposal and also refused to allow the Government of Pakistan any role in administering a plebiscite.

The dispute was the first serious crisis in Indo-Pakistani relations.

=== September ===
- 30 September: Pakistan joins the United Nations as a member state.

=== December ===
- 27 December: A Douglas C-48C (VT-AUG) of Air India crashed into Korangi Creek en route from Karachi to Bombay, killing all 23 onboard (4 crew and 19 passengers). The crash was found to have been the result of poor visibility during night hours and the instrument lights not working, with serious fault assigned to the captain. The crash was Pakistan's first deadly airliner crash.

== See also ==
- 1947 in India
