= 1955 in Pakistan =

- Decades: 1940s; 1950s; 1960s; 1970s
- See also: History of Pakistan; List of years in Pakistan; Timeline of Pakistani history

Events from the year 1955 in Pakistan.

== Incumbents ==
=== Federal government ===
- Queen Elizabeth II as Queen of Pakistan
- Governor-General: Malik Ghulam Muhammad (until 7 August), Iskander Mirza (starting 6 October)
- Prime Minister: Muhammad Ali Bogra (until 12 August), Chaudhry Muhammad Ali (starting 12 August)
- Chief Justice: Muhammad Munir

=== Governors ===
- Governor of Northwest Frontier: Qurban Ali Shah (until 14 October), vacant thereafter
- Governor of West Punjab: Mushtaq Ahmed Gurmani (until 14 October), vacant thereafter
- Governor of Sindh: Iftikhar Hussain Khan Mamdot (until 14 October), vacant thereafter

== Events ==
- June 21 – 1955 Pakistani Constituent Assembly election.
- September 23 – "Baghdad Pact": Military treaty among Iraq, Turkey, the U.K., Pakistan, and Iran is ratified by Pakistan.

== Births ==
- July 22 – Asif Ali Zardari, politician

=== Date unknown ===
- Mirawas, comedian and singer (d. 2025)

== See also ==
- List of Pakistani films of 1955
