= First five-year plan =

First five-year plan may refer to:

- First five-year plan (China)
- First Five-Year Plans (Pakistan)
- First five-year plan (Soviet Union)

== See also ==
- Five-year plan (disambiguation)
