= 1950 in Pakistan =

- Decades: 1940s; 1950s; 1960s; 1970s
- See also: History of Pakistan; List of years in Pakistan; Timeline of Pakistani history

Events from the year 1950 in Pakistan.

== Incumbents ==
=== Monarch ===
- King George VI (consort – Queen Elizabeth)

=== Federal government ===
- Governor-General – Khawaja Nazimuddin
- Prime Minister: Liaquat Ali Khan
- Chief Justice: Abdul Rashid

=== Governors ===
- Governor of Northwest Frontier:
  - until 14 January: Sahibzada Mohammad Khurshid
  - 14 January-17 February: Khan Bahadur Muhammad Ibrahim Khan
  - starting 17 February: Ismail Ibrahim Chundrigar
- Governor of West Punjab: Abdur Rab Nishtar
- Governor of Sindh: Mian Aminuddin

== Events ==
=== January ===
- 4 January - President of Pakistan recognizes People's Republic of China.

=== April ===
- 2 April – Liaquat Ali Khan visits Delhi for meetings with Indian Prime Minister Nehru.
- 8 April – Liaquat and Nehru sign what becomes known as the Liaquat-Nehru Pact.
- The Roman Catholic Archdiocese of Karachi, originally known as the Diocese of Karachi, erected on 20 May 1948, was elevated as the Archdiocese of Karachi on 15 July 1950.

=== May ===
- 18 May - Peshawar University is established.

=== July ===
- 11 July - Pakistan joins the International Monetary Fund and World Bank.

=== September ===
- 6 September - General Mohammad Ayub Khan, becomes the first Pakistani as Commander-in-Chief of the Pakistan Army.
- 30 September - 1950 Afghan invasion of Pakistan - Afghan troops cross into the Chaman District, before they are defeated and repulsed in just six days.

== See also ==
- List of Pakistani films of 1950
