= 1956 in Pakistan =

- Decades: 1940s; 1950s; 1960s; 1970s
- See also: History of Pakistan; List of years in Pakistan; Timeline of Pakistani history

Events from the year 1956 in Pakistan.

== Incumbents ==
=== Federal government ===
- Queen Elizabeth II as Queen of Pakistan (until 23 March)
- Governor-General: Iskander Mirza (until 23 March)
- President: Iskander Mirza (starting 23 March)
- Prime Minister: Chaudhry Muhammad Ali (until 12 September), Huseyn Shaheed Suhrawardy (starting 12 September)
- Chief Justice: Muhammad Munir

== Events ==
- January 19, 1956 West Pakistan Interim Assembly election
- March 5, 1956 Pakistani presidential election
- March 23, Pakistan becomes the first Islamic republic in the world. Pakistan also becomes a Commonwealth republic (Republic Day in Pakistan, now known as Pakistan Day)
- March 23, Iskander Mirza becomes the first President of Pakistan.
- April 23, Pakistan Republican Party established.
- September 12, Huseyn Shaheed Suhrawardy becomes Prime Minister of Pakistan.
- December 10, 1956 East Pakistan provincial by-election.

== Births ==
- August 12 – Fahim Gul, squash player

== See also ==
- List of Pakistani films of 1956
