= Cable 1971 =

Cable 1971 or File 1971 refers to a confidential intelligence communication circulated within Pakistan's military establishment in late 1952, summarizing reactions of service personnel to the Basic Principles Committee (BPC) report, which outlined proposals for Pakistan's constitutional framework. The reactions were requested through a priority signal sent by the Inter-Services Intelligence (ISI) to Services Headquarters.

== Details ==
In late December 1952, the Inter-Services Intelligence sent a priority signal to the Services Headquarters asking for detailed reactions of service personnel to the Basic Principles Committee report. Deputy Director Naval Intelligence Commander S. M. Ahsan replied with their reactions:

"a. The creation of Committee of Ulema to veto the decisions taken in the House of People on religious matters, gives excess of powers to Ulema over the rights of elected representatives of the people. This gives an impression of Pakistan as being a Theocratic State.

b. To recommend that the head of the state should be a Muslim will unnecessarily create suspicions in minds of the minorities in Pakistan. The choice to select the head of the state should be left entirely to the people, to select without prejudice to caste, colour and creed.

c. It is maintained by same officers that a single House elected on population basis should have been envisaged, and we should cease to think in terms of Bengalis and Punjabis etc. The parity between West & East Pakistan will ultimately result in the division of Pakistan into two different groups, therefore, it is the very negation of one people, one country and one culture."
