= 1953 Coronation Honours (Pakistan) =

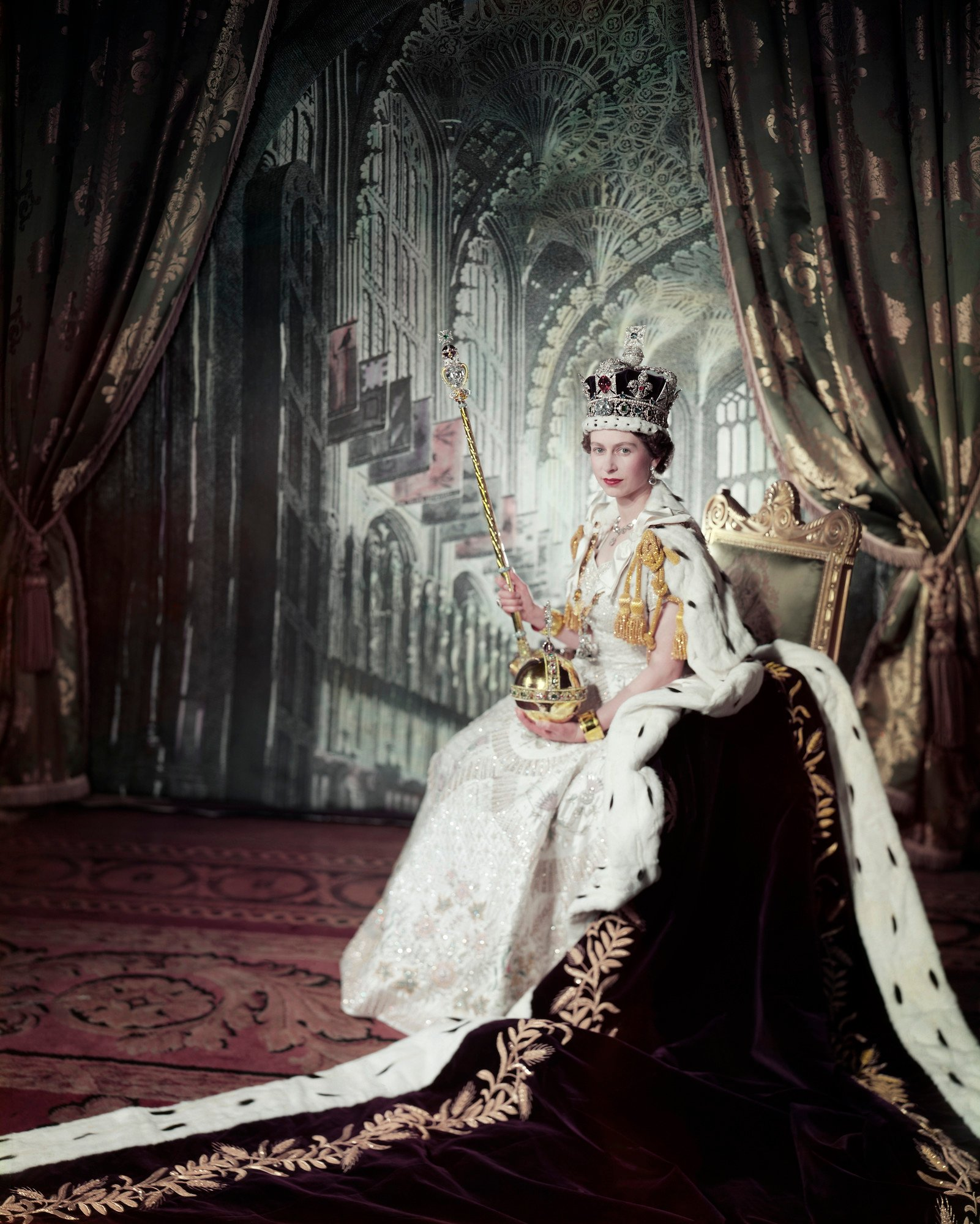
Coronation portrait by Cecil Beaton, 1953

The 1953 Coronation Honours in Pakistan, celebrating the coronation of Elizabeth II, Queen of Pakistan, were appointments made by the Queen on the advice of the Government of Pakistan to various orders and honours to reward and highlight good works by Pakistanis. The honours were announced on 1 June 1953.

The recipients of honours are displayed here as they were styled before their new honour.

== Knight Bachelor ==
- Oliver Gilbert Grace, Esq., C.I.E, O.B.E, Inspector General of Police, Karachi
- Sidney Ridley, Esq., Revenue Commissioner, Sind

== Order of the British Empire ==
=== Knight Commander (KBE) ===
Civil division

- Terrence Bernard Creagh Coen, Esq., C.I.E., Secretary, Cabinet Secretariat

=== Commander (CBE) ===
Civil division

- Stephen Benedict Hatch Barnwell, Esq., Commissioner, Civil Supplies, East Bengal
- Thomas Malcolm Oag, Esq., Director of Navigation, Central Engineering Authority

Military division

- Brigadier (temporary) John Tilly (45001), Duke of Cornwall's Light Infantry
- Colonel (temporary) Frederick William Whiteman, O.B.E. (MZ/12128), Pakistan Armed Forces Medical Services

=== Officer (OBE) ===
Civil Division

- Francis Ward Allinson, Esq., M.B., B.S., Professor of Surgery, Medical College Hospital, Dacca
- Edward John MacDonald Dent, Esq., Revenue and Divisional Commissioner, North West Frontier Province
- Roger Antony Fitzwilliam Howroyd, Esq., Municipal Commissioner, Karachi
- Alan Ian MacMillan, Esq., Deputy Chief Accounts Officer, East Bengal Railway

Military division

- Lieutenant-Colonel (temporary) Charles William Marr Young (64553), Royal Corps of Signals
- Wing Commander Robert Wentworth Stephen Cross (72126), Royal Air Force
- Wing Commander (acting) Stanley Williams (45871), Royal Air Force

=== Member (MBE) ===
Civil Division

- Humphrey Arthington Davy, Esq., Political Agent, Sibi
- Charles Douglas Hewson, Esq., Administrative Officer, Air Headquarters
- Henry James MacDonald, Esq., Grade I Staff Officer, Air Headquarters
- Cecil Mills, Esq., Assistant Secretary, Ministry of Defence
- John Leslie Taylor, Esq., Superintendent of Police (Technical), Punjab

Military division

- Lieutenant-Commander (L) Gordon Walter Bridle, Royal Navy
- Major (temporary) John Long (322042), Pakistan Electrical and) Mechanical Engineers
- Major (temporary) James William Moore (241159), Bedfordshire and Hertfordshire Regiment

== Companion of the Imperial Service Order (ISO) ==
Pakistan Civil Service

- Walter Ferdenand Grossman, Esq., Administrative Officer, Directorate-General of Health
