= List of Pakistani films of 1955 =

A list of films produced in Pakistan in 1955:

== 1955 ==
Title	Director	Cast	Genre	Notes
1955
Heer				
Humari Zaban	Shaikh Hassan	Beena, Sheikh Hassan	Drama	This was the first ever Karachi made film, released on June 10, 1955.
Ilteja		Ragni, S. Gul, Salim Raza		
Intekhaab		Jamila Razzaq, Masood		
Inteqaam		Sabiha, Santosh, M. Ismael		
Jallan		Nadra, Inayat Bhatti, Zarif		
Jheel Kinaray		Gulshan Ara, Sudhir, Talish		
Khatoon	Nazir & Naeem	Sawarn Lata, Nazir, Naeem Hashmi		
Khizaan Ke Baad		Shammi, Sudhir, Allauddin		
Mehfil		Sabiha, Sudhir, Allauddin		
Naukar	M.M. Billoo Mehra	Sawarn Lata, Nazir, Shaad, Ragni, Zeenat, Asha Posley, ChunChun, A. Shah, G.N. Butt and Agha Salim Raza	Drama	Released on May 24, 1955
Nazrana		Ragni, Santosh, Nazar, Azad		
Qatil	Anwar Kemal Pasha	Sabiha, Santosh, Aslam Pervez, Musarrat Nazir, Nayyar Sultana, Akmal	Drama	Released on January 22, 1955
Shararay		Sabiha, Ragni, S. Gul		
Sohni		Sabiha, Sudhir, Shammi		
Toofaan	Haidar Shah	Sabiha, Sudhir, Asha, Zarif	Drama	Released on July 31, 1955

== See also ==
- 1955 in Pakistan
