= List of Pakistani films of 1956 =

A list of films produced in Pakistan in 1956 (see 1956 in film) and in the Urdu language:

== 1956 ==
Title	Director	Cast	Genre	Notes
1956
Anokhi		Sheela Ramani, Shaad, Lehri		
Baaghi	Ashfaq Malik	Allauddin, Musarrat Nazir, Sultan Rahi, Sudhir, Agha Talish	Drama	Sultan Rahi's debut film as an actor.
Chhoti Baigum	Atta Ulla Shah Hashmi	Sabiha Khanum, Sudhir, Naeem Hashmi		
Darbar-e-Habib		Yasmin, Talish, Majeed		
Dulla Bhatti (1956 film)				
Funkar		Khursheed, Pervez, Jameela		
Hameeda		Sabiha Khanum, Santosh Kumar, Ejaz Durrani		
Haqeeqat		Yasmin, Masood, Zeenat		
Hatim		Sabiha Khanum, Sudhir, Nazar, Ilyas		
Intezar	Masood Pervez	Noor Jehan, Satosh Kumar, Asha Posley, Ghulam Mohammad	Drama	The film was released on May 12, 1956. A landmark movie for music director Khwaja Khurshid Anwar with many super-hit film songs.
Kanwari Bewah		Shamim Ara, Ayyaz, Nazar		Shamim Ara's debut film as an actress.
Karnaama		Klawati, Luddan, Sawan		
Lakht-e-Jigar	Luqman	Noor Jehan, Santosh Kumar, Habib	Drama	The film was released on February 17, 1956. Many hit film songs by music director Ghulam Ahmed Chishti.
Mandi		Khursheed, Ayyaz, Nighat		
Mirza Saheban	Daud Chand	Musarrat Nazir, Sudhir	Drama	The film was released on May 30, 1956
Miss 56		Meena Shorey, Santosh Kumar, Aslam Pervaiz		
Mukh-o-Mukhush	Abdul Jabbar Khan	Abdul Jabbar Khan, Ahmed, Purnima Sen, Nazma (Peary), Zaharat Ara, Ali Mansur, Fafiq, Narul Anarn Khan, Saifuddin, Bilkis Bad	Drama	The first Bengali film produced in Pakistan. The film was released on August 3, 1956 in Dacca, East Pakistan (now Bangladesh).
Pawwan		Shammi, Sudhir, Zarif, Nazir		
Kismet		Musarrat Nazir, Santosh Kumar, Yasmin		
Sabira		Sawarn Lata, Nazir, Nazar, Ilyas		
Sarfarosh	Anwar Kamal Pasha	Sabiha Khanum, Santosh Kumar, Meena Shorey, Naeem Hashmi, Asif Jah, Ghulam Mohammad	Romance; Drama	The film was released on May 30, 1956. Many hit songs by music director Rasheed Attre.
Shalimar		Rehana, Sudhir, Shola, Nazar		
Shikar		Safia Din, Rushdi, Ayyaz		
Soteli Maa		Swaran Lata, Nazir, Nazar, Masood		
Wehshi		Rehana, Afzal Nazir, Zarif		

== See also ==
- 1956 in Pakistan
