= George Baxandall Constantine =

British-Pakistani jurist

Justice Sir George Baxandall Constantine

Justice of the Supreme Court of Pakistan
- In office 1955–1960
- Nominated by: Muhammad Ali
- Appointed by: Iskander Ali Mirza

Chief Justice of Sindh High Court
- In office 1949 – 1955
- Nominated by: Liaquat Ali Khan
- Appointed by: Khwaja Nazim-ud-Din
- Preceded by: Justice Hatim B. Tyabji
- Succeeded by: Justice Hassanali G. Agha

4th Governor of Sindh
- In office 2 May 1953 – 11 August 1953
- Monarch: Elizabeth II
- Governor General: Malik Ghulam Muhammad
- Prime Minister: Mohammad Ali Bogra
- Preceded by: Mian Aminuddin
- Succeeded by: Habib Rahimtoola

Personal details
- Born: June 2, 1902 Bradford, England, United Kingdom
- Died: 1969 London, United Kingdom
- Citizenship: United Kingdom (1902–47; 1960–69); Pakistan (1947–69)
- Education: Bradford Grammar School
- Alma mater: Balliol College, Oxford

Sir George Baxandall Constantine (22 June 1902 – 8 September 1969) was an English and Pakistani jurist who served as the Chief Justice of Sindh High Court, and prior to that, Governor of Sindh for a brief tenure. In 1955, he was elevated as a justice of the Supreme Court of Pakistan and served until 1960.

Considered original textualist in his jurisprudence, he gained public importance when he termed Sir Malik Ghulam's attempt to dissolve the Constituent Assembly illegal, ruling in favour of the Speaker of the National Assembly, Maulvi Tamizuddin to restore Prime Minister Nazimuddin's administration.

In his famous Irish accent, he went on to declare the assembly as sovereign but Chief Justice Munir overturned Constantine's decision in the historic Maulvi Tamizuddin case.

== Early life ==
George Baxandall Constantine was born in Bradford, England, United Kingdom on 2 June 1902 into an Irish-English family. He was educated at the Bradford Grammar School and attended the Oxford University where he graduated with a LBB degree. He joined the Indian Civil Service in 1926, serving in the judicial services of the empire.
