= List of Pakistani films of 1952 =

A list of films produced in Pakistan in 1952 (see 1952 in film): A total of 6 films were released in the country.

== 1952 ==
Opening	Title	Genre	Language	Director	Cast	Notes
4 January 1952	Bheegi Palken	Social film	Urdu	Sharif Nayyar	Swaran Lata, Nazir, Nazar, Allauddin, Ilyas Kashmiri, Ajmal, Shahana, Maya Devi, Ghulam Qadir, G.N. Butt, Shatir Ghaznavi, (Guest: Inayat Hussain Bhatti)	
1 February 1952	Shola	Social film	Urdu	Khadim Mohayuddin	Irshad, Masood, Asha Poslay, Sadiq Ali, Maya Devi, Abbu Shah, G.N. Butt	
28 March 1952	Dupatta	Romantic, musical film	Urdu	Sabtain Fazli	Noorjahan, Ajay Kumar, Sudhir, Azad, Ghulam Mohammad, Nafisa Begum, Bibbo, Syed Rafiq, Zohra, Iffat, Owais, (Guest: Yasmin)	This great musical film was third hat-trick of success by Madam Noor Jehan and musician Feroz Nizami (after Jugnu and Chann Way).
4 April 1952	Harjai	Social film	Urdu	Shafqat Shah	Najma, Masood, Zeenat, Asif Jah, Zahoor Shah, Sadiq Ali, Kalavati	
24 October 1952	Nath	Social film	Punjabi	Shafi Mohammad Ejaz	Hafeez Jahan, Haseeb, Talish, Zarif, Ajmal, Sadiq Ali	
26 December 1952	Naveli	Social film	Urdu	Hyeder Shah	Gulshan Ara, Rehan, Sultan Khoost, M. Ismael	This was the debut for Rehan. The first name of this film was Karwatten.

== See also ==
- 1952 in Pakistan
