= Rakhman Gul =

Pakistani general and provincial governor

Governor of Sindh
- In office 1 July 1970 – 22 December 1971
- Preceded by: Office restored
- Succeeded by: Mumtaz Ali Bhutto

Military service
- Branch/service: Pakistan Army
- Rank: Lieutenant general

Rakhman Gul was a Pakistani general who served as the Governor of Sindh from July 1970 to December 1971. He also served as Pakistan's high commissioner to Afghanistan.

== Career ==
Rakhman Gul was a lieutenant general in the Pakistan Army. He became governor of Sindh on 1 July 1970, when the One Unit system was dissolved and Sindh was restored as a separate province. He served as governor until 22 December 1971.

He also served as head of mission in Kabul.
