= List of Pakistani films of 1951 =

A list of films produced in Pakistan in 1951 (see 1951 in film): A total of 8 films were released in the country.

Opening	Title	Genre	Language	Director	Cast	Notes
2 March 1951	Akeli	Social film	Urdu	M.M. Mehra	Ragni, Santosh, Neena, Noor Mohammad Charlie, Nazar, Bibbo, Maya Devi, G.N. Butt, Shobna Raاni, Fareeda, Agha Pir Jan, Master Sikandar	
2 March 1951	Eid	Social film	Urdu	Najm-ul-Hassan	Yasmin, S. Gul, Najmul Hassan, Suresh, Chandni, M. Ismael, Mirza Musharraf, Ashiq Hussain, G.N. Butt, Fozia	This film was started before partition.
30 March 1951	Chann Vay	Romantic, musical film	Punjabi	Noorjahan (supervisor: Syed Shoukat Hussain Rizvi)	Noorjahan, Santosh, Jahangir Khan, Yasmin, Ghulam Mohammad, Saleem Raza, Nafees Begum, Sultan Khoost, Zahoor Shah, Ghulam Qadir, Irshad, Nayab Sarhadi, Nazeer Bedi, Faqiir Mohammad, A.R. Kashmiri	Madam Noorjahan returned to Pakistan and started her film career as actress, singer and film director with this hit musical Punjabi film. This film ran 18 weeks on Regent cinema Lahore which was allotted to Mr. & Mrs Rizvi (as they also got Shori/ShahNoor studio!). Noorjahan's name was mentioned as director of the film but it was told that her husband Syed Shoukat Hussain Rizvi actually was the real director, but he felt shame to give his name as director to a Punjabi film. Ironically, all of his Urdu films as director in Pakistan were flopped.
4 May 1951	Ham Watan	Social film	Urdu	Farrukh Bukhari	Maya Devi, Farraukh Bukhari, Sahira, Ajmal, M. Ismaela	
3 August 1951	Dilbar	Social film	Punjabi	Anwar Kamal Pasha	Shamim, Anwar Kemal Pasha, Asif Jah, Ajmal, Sahira, Ilyas Kashmiri, M. Ismael	Director Anwar Kamal Pasha appeared as hero in Punjabi film Dilbar and he also married the film heroine Shamim..
3 August 1951	Ghairat	Social film	Urdu	Amin Malik	Sabiha, Masood, Allauddin, Sadiq Ali, Ghulam Mohammad, Ajmal	
7 September 1951	Pinjra	Social film	Urdu	Amin Malik	Sabiha, Masood, Amin Malik, Ilyas Kashmiri, Ghulam Mohammad, Azad	
7 December 1951	Billo	Social film	Punjabi	Amjad Hussain	Najma, Darpan (Ishrat), Zeenat, Zarif, M. Ismael, Kamla, Ghulam Mohammad, Mirza Sultan Baig (Nizam Din)	Due to a protest from musician community the name of Punjabi film Meerasi was changed to Billo. Radio Pakistan Lahore's legendary artist Nizam Din (Mirza Sultan Baig) from "Jamhoor di awaz" played a role in this film Film hero Darpan was introduced with his real name Ishrat (Abbas)..

== See also ==
- 1950 in Pakistan
