= 1957 in Pakistan =

- Decades: 1940s; 1950s; 1960s; 1970s
- See also: History of Pakistan; List of years in Pakistan; Timeline of Pakistani history

Events from the year 1957 in Pakistan.

== Incumbents ==
=== Federal government ===
- President: Iskander Mirza
- Prime Minister:
  - until 17 October: Huseyn Shaheed Suhrawardy
  - 17 October-16 December: Ibrahim Ismail Chundrigar
  - starting 16 December: Feroz Khan Noon
- Chief Justice: Muhammad Munir

== Events ==
=== August ===
- Pakistan celebrates its tenth year as an independent nation.

=== October ===
- Ibrahim Ismail Chundrigar replaces Huseyn Shaheed Suhrawardy as Prime Minister.

=== December ===
- Ibrahim Ismail Chundrigar, having served as Prime Minister for only 56 days, is forced to resign. Feroz Khan Noon succeeds Chundrigar as Prime Minister. He is the seventh Prime Minister in 10 years.

== See also ==
- List of Pakistani films of 1957
