= Shaikh Din Muhammad =

Pakistani politician

Sheikh Din Muhammad

2nd Governor of Sindh
- In office 4 October 1948 – 19 November 1949
- Prime Minister: Liaquat Ali Khan
- Preceded by: Ghulam Hussain Hidayatullah
- Succeeded by: Mian Aminuddin

Sheikh Din Muhammad (Note: For seeing list of governors of Sindh See: list of governors of Sindh) was a Pakistani jurist and politician who served as the 2nd Governor of Sindh after the death of Ghulam Hussain Hidayatullah on 4 October 1948 to 19 November 1949. Sheikh Din was born in Jhang on 5 June 1897.

== Governor of Sindh (1948 – 1949) ==
After the death of Sindh's first Governor Al-Haaj Ghulam Hussain Hidayatullah, he won election and became the 2nd Governor of Sindh. He resigned on 19 November 1949, spending only one year as the governor of Sindh.
