= Call Ready =

Bangladeshi microphone and sound service company

- কল-রেডী
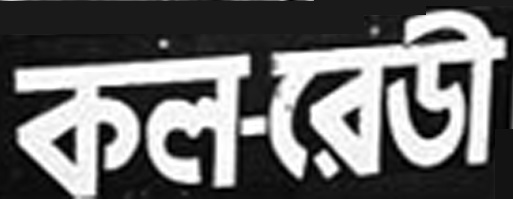
- Logo

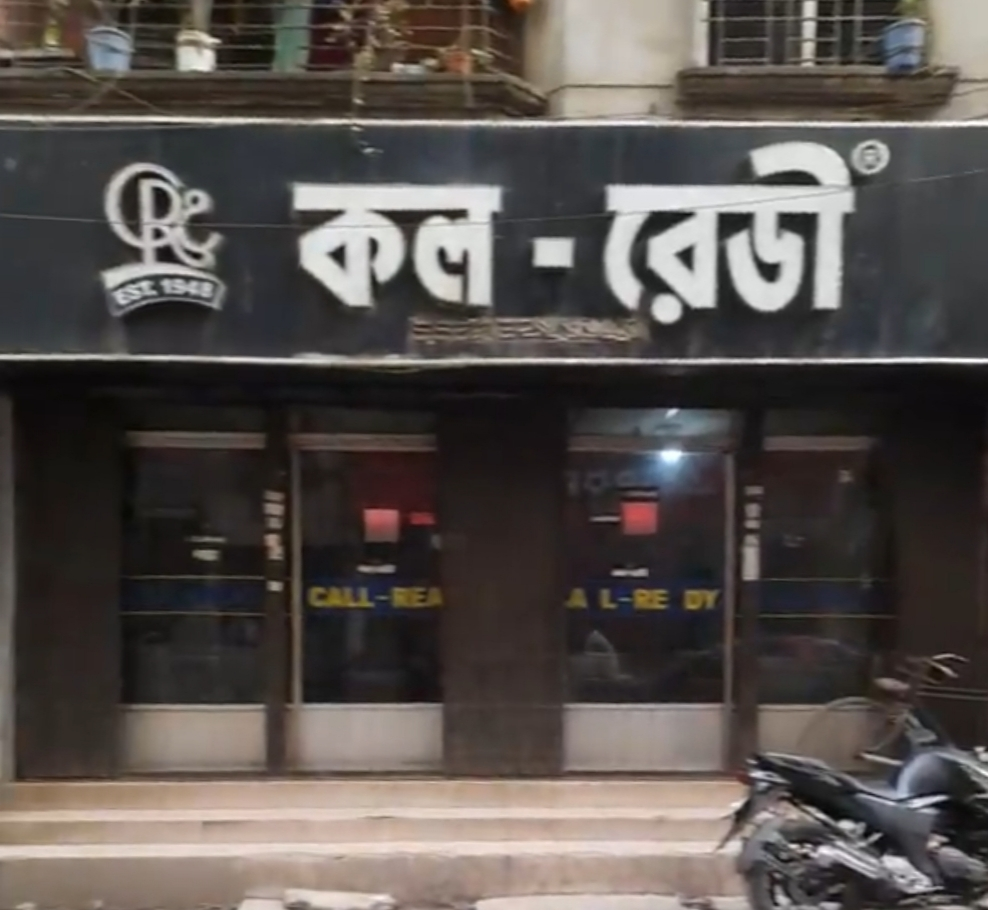
- Call-Ready in 2023
- Predecessor: Arju Light house
- Formation: 1948
- Founder: Haripad Ghosh; Dayal Ghosh
- Founded at: Dhaka, Bangladesh
- Type: Microphone service
- Coordinates: 23.7075°N 90.4177°E

Call-Ready (Bengali: কল-রেডী) is a traditional microphone service provider in Bangladesh. Before the independence of Bangladesh, this microphone service was frequently used in various movements in East Pakistan. The notable events where the service was used, the Bengali language movement in 1952, 1954 East Bengali legislative election, the Six point movement in 1966, 1969 Mass uprising, 1970 Pakistani general election and 7 March Speech.

In addition to political events involving Bangladeshi politicians, Call-Ready was also used at events featuring foreign heads of state. Notable figures who spoke through Call-Ready microphones include Indira Gandhi, Yasser Arafat, Nelson Mandela, Bill Clinton, Pranab Mukherjee, and Atal Bihari Vajpayee. Traditionally, the Awami League and other political parties in Bangladesh have frequently used Call-Ready.

== History ==
In 1948, two brothers, Haripada Ghosh and Doyal Ghosh, started a shop named 'Arju Light House' in Sutrapur, Dhaka. Initially, they rented out gramophones and provided lighting services for various events. At first, they imported a few microphones from India and made some hand microphones themselves to rent out for events and gatherings. As demand grew, they began importing microphones from countries like China, Taiwan, and Japan.

Around the same time, the demand for microphones increased due to the growing protests and rallies demanding language rights. The name 'Call-Ready' was chosen for their microphone service. It was based on the idea that "if someone calls (calls them), their organization should always be ready (prepared)." Thus, the name Call-Ready was coined from this thought. By 1954, the number of employees at the microphone service established by the two brothers had surpassed 20.

== 7th March Speech ==
On 7th March 1971, at the then Racecourse Ground (now Suhrawardy Udyan) in Dhaka, on the eve of the Bangladesh War of Independence, Sheikh Mujibur Rahman delivered his historic speech. In late October 2017, this speech was recognized as a "Documentary Heritage" by UNESCO. Call-Ready microphones were used during the 7th March Speech.

Before the 7th March speech, Sheikh Mujibur Rahman summoned Haripada Ghosh and Doyal Ghosh to his residence in Dhanmondi, asking them to prepare microphones at the Racecourse Ground. Three days before the rally, they set up the microphones under the cover of darkness and kept them concealed. They also stored some microphones at Dhaka University. The microphone and microphone stand used during the 7th March speech are currently preserved by Call-Ready.
