= Ashfaq Hussain =

Pakistani writer (born 1951)

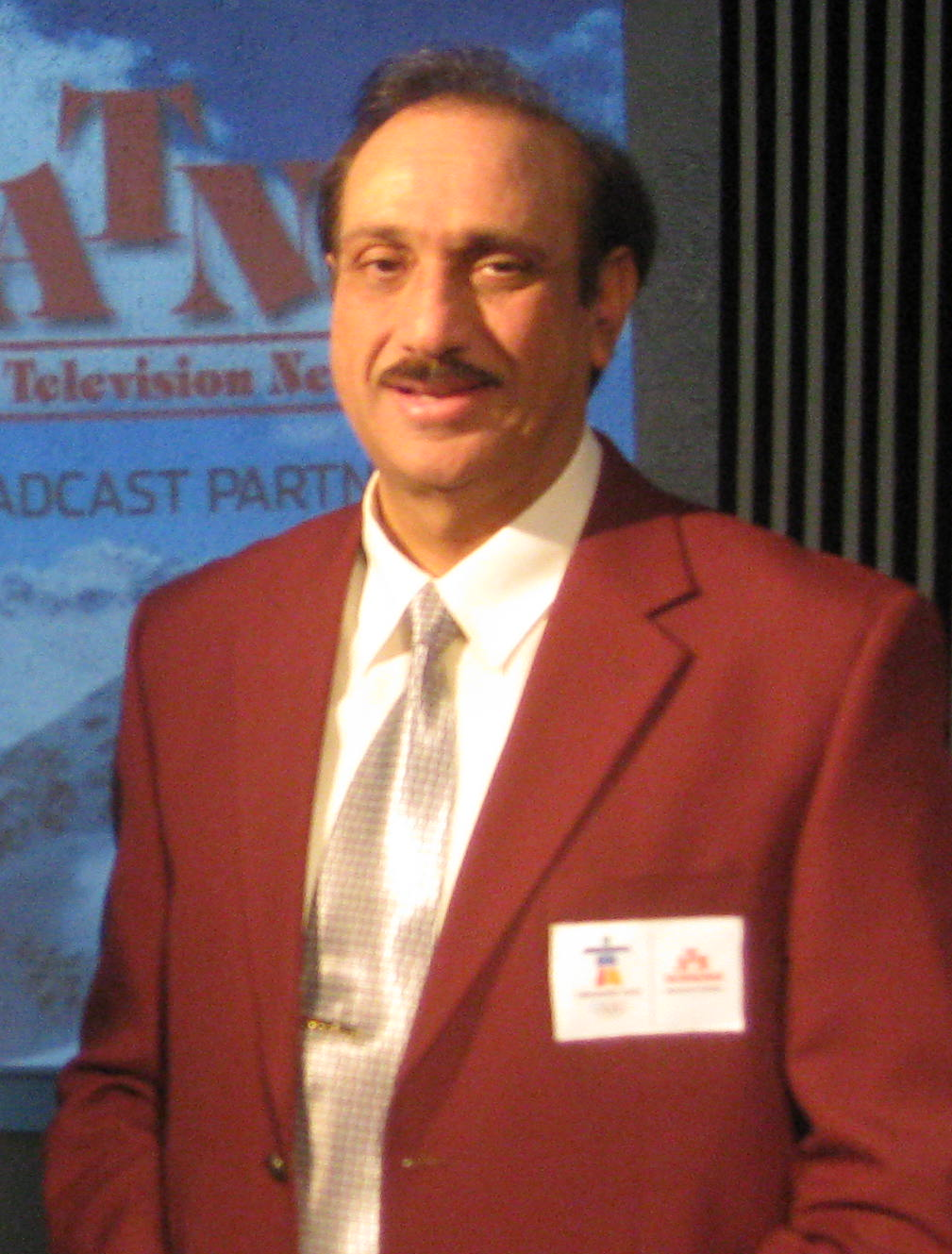
- Hussain in 2010
- Born: 1 January 1951 (age 75); Karachi, Sindh, Pakistan
- Education: University of Karachi
- Occupation: Urdu poet
- Writing career
- Notable awards: Presidential Pride of Performance

Ashfaq Hussain Zaidi, PP, (born 1 January 1951) is a Pakistani Urdu poet and author of more than 10 books of poetry and literary criticism. He is considered at least by one commentator to be an expert on the life and works of Urdu poets Faiz Ahmed Faiz, Ahmad Faraz and also on the Progressive Writers Movement.

== Works ==
=== Authored ===
- Faiz Ek Jaiza (1977)
- Aitabar (1979)
- That Day Will Dawn (1985)
- Neendar Nal Rishta (1986)
- Hum Ajnabi Hain (1992)
- Faiz Habib e Amberdast (1992)
- Faiz ke Maghrabi Hawaley (1993)
- Faiz shakhsiat aur fun (2006)
- Ahmad Faraz: yadoon ka ek sunehra waraq (2008)
- Aashian Gum Karda (2009)
- Mein Gaya Waqt Nahin Hoon(2010)(Published in India)
- Sheeshoan Ka Masiha (2011)
- Deewar-e-Dabastan Par (2012)

His Urdu poetry has been translated into English and Punjabi.
