= Abid Azad =

- আবিদ আজাদ
- Born: Habibur Rahman; 16 November 1952
- Died: 22 March 2005 (aged 52)
- Education: University of Dhaka
- Occupation: Poet
- Writing career
- Pen name: Sumon Al Yousuf

Abid Azad (16 November 1952 – 22 March 2005) was an eminent Bangladeshi poet, critic and literary editor. Azad was the author of 19 books of poetry including Ghaser Ghatana (1976), Amar Mon Kemon Kore (1980), Banotaruder Marma (1982), and Shiter Rachanabali (1983).

== Early life ==
Abid Azad was born as Habibur Rahman, as named by his parents. Nicknamed Renu, he was the second-born of eleven children. He wrote poems with the names Renu and Sumon Al Yousuf. His first book of poems, Ghaser Ghatana, was published in 1976. He studied in Azimuddin School, Gurudoyal College and the University of Dhaka.

== Personal life ==
Azad's wife died in 1987. Their first son, Taimur Rashid, was born in 1982.
