= Basic Principles Committee =

The Basic Principles Committee (BPC) was a specialized committee set up in March 1949 by Khawaja Nazimuddin on the advice of prime minister Liaquat Ali Khan. The committee's sole purpose was to determine the basic underlying principles that would determine future constitutions and legislature in Pakistan.

Initial recommendations and proposals suggested by the BPC were strongly criticized in the local media and the public. Much of the criticism came from East Pakistan where the committee proposals were said to be subversive of the ideology of Pakistan, under-representing the majority province and neglecting the Bengali language thoroughly in the constitutional and legislative process. The suggestion of the formation of a religious oversight board was also seen as "undemocratic [and] an insult to Islam".

== Formation ==
Before the first constituent assembly of Pakistan could formulate any constitution or legislature, it was necessary to put in order the basic principles that would determine how the constitution should be framed. On 7 March 1949, the Objectives Resolution was presented, which serves to this day as the grundnorm for constitutional process in Pakistan. The resolution was adopted by the constituent assembly on 12 March 1949, when 21 members voted for it.

The Basic Principles Committee (BPC) was formed on the same day by the constituent assembly. The committee was set up by governor-general Khawaja Nazimuddin upon advice from Prime Minister Liaquat Ali Khan. It was presided over by Maulvi Tamizuddin Khan with Liaquat Ali Khan serving also as its vice-president. The committee had 24 other members, though not all were members of the constituent assembly as well.

The purpose of the BPC was to formulate the basic principles based on the Objectives Resolution using which the future constitutions of Pakistan would be framed. The committee was asked to propose basic principles and concerned recommendations that would help the constituent assembly with their constitutional and legislative tasks. In order to do so, the committee had its initial two meetings in April 1949 where three distinct sub-committees were formed to deal with specialized tasks:

- A subcommittee to deal with matters of federal and provincial constitution and distribution of powers;
- A subcommittee to deal with matters of adult franchise; and,
- A subcommittee to deal with matters of the judiciary.

== First proposal ==
The BPC presented its initial report to the constituent assembly on 28 September 1950. The main features presented in the report were also simultaneously published in an article in the Dawn newspaper a day later, ushering strong criticism from the public, particularly from critics in East Pakistan.

=== Salient features ===
The report called for the state of Pakistan to be a federation where Urdu was to be the state language. It also formally recognized the Objectives Resolution as an integral part of the constitution of Pakistan and the legislative process, suggesting that the resolution should be incorporated into the constitution as "a directive principle of [state] policy".

The report also presented a suggestion for the central legislature was to be a bicameral with an upper house consisting of 100 members, and a lower house consisting of 400 members. The upper house was to be elected by the provincial legislature serving as the representative institution of the provinces, while the lower house was to be elected by the people on the basis of adult franchise. The tenure of both houses was to be five years with both enjoying equal power. The decisions regarding budget or monetary bills were to be decided in joint sessions of the two houses.

The head of state was to be elected by a joint session of the two houses for a term of five years working on the advice of the prime minister. The federal legislature would have the authority to remove the head of state. The head of state was given added powers like the authority to abrogate the constitution and issue ordinances.

Each province would have its own legislature elected on the basis of adult franchise for a term of five years. The head of the provincial legislature was to be elected by the head of state for a term of five years working on the advice of the chief minister.

The Supreme Court was to be the head of judiciary consisting of a chief justice and 2 to 6 judges. It was suggested to establish High Courts for each province.

It was also the first time that the establishment of a religious oversight board was suggested. A board of ulema (religious scholars) was suggested to be appointed by the head of state and provincial governors to examine the processes of law-making ensuring those laws to be in accordance with the Quran and the Sunnah.

Legislative power was to be divided into three lists:

- Federal list, comprising 67 subjects on which the central legislature would legislate;
- Provincial list, comprising 35 items on which the provincial legislature would legislate; and,
- Concurrent list, comprising 37 items on which both the central and provincial legislatures had the authority to legislate.

The residuary powers were vested in the centre.

The procedure to amend the constitution was made very rigid. It required majority approval from the central and provincial legislatures. In case of any dispute, the Supreme Court would have the authority to interpret the constitution.

=== Reaction and criticism ===
These initial recommendations raised a firestorm of protest. It was called reactionary, undemocratic, an insult to Islam, smacking of fascist approach, subversive of the ideology of Pakistan and a gross betrayal of the solemn pledges made to the people. In particular, the report was highly criticized by Sris Chandra Chattopadhyay who observed that East Pakistan, being more populous than West Pakistan, would be under-represented if both were given an equal number of seats in the upper house. This would have effectively rendered the eastern province a minority. Bengali critics also voiced concern over making Urdu the national language while thoroughly neglecting the Bengali language from the constitutional arena. There was also criticism of the proposals for a strong centre with vast powers on financial matters.

On 4 October 1950, in an editorial published in the Nawa-i-Waqt, the report was called a "charter of people's slavery".

Amidst furious criticisms, Liaquat Ali Khan refrained from considering the report and invited the committee to present revised proposals and suggestions. He also called for general suggestions and comments from the public in order to incorporate public opinion. Another special sub-committee was formed therein to facilitate such measures. This sub-committee was headed by Sardar Abdur Rab Nishtar and later presented a revised report in the constituent assembly in July 1952.

== Second proposal ==
In light of the criticism received for the first proposal, the committee moved towards including greater participation of public opinion into their successive report to the constituent assembly. An interim draft for a second report of the BPC had been finalized by the third week of November and was to be presented to the Constituent Assembly on 23 November 1952. Its presentation was however postponed at the very last minute due to reservations held by some members of the committee.

The BPC held a meeting on 19 December 1952 where the final draft for the second proposal was signed. But, in the conspicuous absence of Mumtaz Daultana, Nurul Amin, Begum Jahanara Shahnawaz, A.H. Gardezi, Justice Abdul Rashid and Mohammad Akram Khan, the report was signed by Malik Shaukat Ali signed it conditionally. The report was presented to the assembly on 22 December 1952.

=== Salient features ===
The main features of the committee's second report focused prominently on the place of Islam in the future constitution of Pakistan. The Objective Resolution was adopted as a preamble to the proposed constitution and the principles defined therein were to guide the state.

With Sardar Abdur Rab Nishtar at the helm of the committee, the second proposal adopted a more Islamic stance. Some suggest it merely contained "religious rhetoric". A specific clause was added to the proposal which laid down procedures to prevent any legislation that is made outside the limits prescribed in the Quran and the Sunnah. It was suggested that existing laws be also brought in conformity with the Islamic principles. The report emphasized the importance of a board of ulema that would vet legislation to make sure that it was in keeping with the teachings of Islam. The committee also recommended that the head of state be a Muslim and that separate electorates be maintained for Muslims and non-Muslims.

During the debate concerning the proposition of the head of state being a Muslim, Sardar Shaukat Hayat Khan observed that the provision was undeniably against fundamental rights. He said, "I presume the country’s population to be 85 percent Muslim and if a Muslim cannot be returned as a Head of State with an 85% Muslim population where a Hindu is returned with a minority of only 15%, then that Hindu must be a saint."

=== Reaction and criticism ===
The modernists denounced the suggestion to create boards of ulemas as a "surrender to mullahism" and a "statutory recognition of priesthood [designed to create a] medieval theocracy in the twentieth century." In a series of letters appearing in The Pakistan Times, critics condemned such proposals stating the boards would become "super legislatures" where "regular priestly class [would be] eager to take part in politics by virtue of their being members of that class [alone]".

There was even more criticism surrounding the inclusion of religious rhetoric in the committee's proposals especially in the formation of the board of ulema; critics called such initiatives "undemocratic [and] an insult to Islam". Nawa-i-Waqt defended the suggestion of creating the board as being "utterly democratic". On 31 December 1952, Dawn newspaper expressed concern that the committee may have exceeded the limits prescribed in the Objectives Resolution.
