= First Five-Year Plans (Pakistan) =

Pakistani national programs for economic development

The First Five-Year Plans for the National Economy of Pakistan, (or also known as First Five-Year Plans), was a set of the Soviet-styled centralized economic plans and targets as part of the economic development initiatives in Pakistan. The plans were drafted by the Finance minister Malick Ghoulam to Prime minister Liaquat Ali Khan who initially backed the programme, in 1948.

At the time of independence of British India by the United Kingdom, Pakistan was an underdeveloped country, relatively standing with Asian countries with distressful economic situations. The country's systems of production, transportation, trade and consumption yielded a very low standard of living of the people, with little opportunity for education, or economic advancement in the country. The industries and financial services were non-existed in the country and agriculture development was among the lowest in the world. The vast majority of the population still inhabited villages and were untouched with the scientific and technological development in past two centuries. The independence had the major effect on country's existing economic infrastructure that disrupted the wholesale transfers of population, trade and business, channels of communication, industrial and commercial organization, and the pressing need to establish new provisional governments.

The economic development planning began in 1948 when Prime minister Liaquat Ali Khan presented the first Five-Year plans at the parliament of Pakistan on 8 July 1948. The first plan was conceived by the Ministry of Finance (MoF), and were studied and developed by the Economic Coordination Committee (ECC) based on the theory of Cost-of-production value, and also covered the areas of Trickle-down system. As part of this programme, the State Bank of Pakistan was established to give a kick start to banking services in the country. Quickly, the major economical infrastructure was expanded and the gap was filled by hiring as the government revenue began to rise. The currency war with India, following the devaluation of Pound Sterling— the currency of United Kingdom, led the deadlock of India-Pakistan trade which was caused by Indian refusal to recognition of country's currency, in 1949.

In the middle of 1950, the relations were restored when India and Pakistan began export trade once again, and in February 1951, India formally accepted to give recognition of Pakistan's currency after entering in new trade agreement, but the older trade relations were not restored. The Korean War led the boom of country's economy but the growth declined after the assassination of Liaqat Ali Khan in October 1951. More ever, the efforts were failed to continuing the programme which was initially unsystematic, partially due to inadequate staff officers and lack of ambitions. In 1953, the programme collapsed when the shortages of clothes, medicines and other essential consumer goods arose; there was also a serious food shortage as a result of a sharp fall in the production of foodgrains in 1951-52 and 1952-53 due to monsoon floods. Prime minister Khawaja Nazimuddin was forced to end the programme after sending his request to provide economical assistance from the United States and other friendly counties.

== Reassessment and collectivization ==
The new studies were again conducted in 1955 after the collapse of first programme. According to the census, over 90% of the population was living in rural areas whilst only 10% was living in urban areas. In East-Pakistan, the urban proportion was low as 4.0% as compared to 18.1% in West-Pakistan, although the urbanization had been increased at an accelerated level. In 1955, Prime minister Muhammad Ali Bogra again revived the plan and published in 1956. After reassessing, the programme was again launched with focusing (as highest priority) on agricultural development, and the strong emphasis placed on rapidly increasing the developmental effort in East-Pakistan and in the less-developed areas of West Pakistan. Prime minister Huseyn Suhrawardy of Awami League gave much priority to food development, agriculture and social development in both states. The concept of Collective farming was introduced by Suhrawardy as part of his agricultural policies and around 27.0Mn rupees were spent in order to organized the agricultural in the country. However, this programme was built entirely in the absence of much essential information and basic statistics.

In practice, this plan was not implemented because of its enormous size that lacked the physical and personnel assistance. The shortage of technical knowledge also devastated the programme. The Awami League's government also had shortage of foreign exchange to execute the plan, and was unable to find outside assistance to fulfill its commitment to the first five-year plans.

== Government documentation ==
- Planning Commission; Government of Pakistan (May 1948). "First Five-Year Plans of Pakistan" (PDF). Government of Pakistan. The Electronic Government of Pakistan.
