= List of Pakistani films before 1950 =

A list of films produced in Pakistan before 1950: A total of 7 films were produced in the country.

== 1948 ==
Opening	Title	Genre	Language	Director	Cast	Box office	Notes
7 August 1948	Teri Yaad	Social & romantic film	Urdu	Dawood Chand	Asha Posley, Nasir Khan, Jahangir Khan, Najma, Kiran Rani, Nazar, Shola, Ghulam Mohammad, Master Ghulam Qadir, Sardar Mohammad, Zubaida, Dewan Sardari Lal	Average	First film to be produced in Pakistan.

== Urdu 1949 ==
Opening	Title	Genre	Language	Director	Cast	Box office	Notes
19 March 1949	Shahida	Social film	Urdu	Luqman	Shamim Bano, Nasir Khan, Shakir, Hamaliya Wala	Average	This film was started as Shafaq and its director was Fazal Shah but due to some untold facts, Luqman took over and made this romantic film as Shahida.
6 May 1949	Hichkolay	Social film	Urdu	Daud Chand	Ajmal, Akhtari, Sudhir, M. Ismail	Average	Sudhir was introduced in his first Pakistani film and played a role of a singer in this film. He had a very long film career.
13 May 1949	Sachai	Social film	Urdu	Nazir	Swaran Lata, Nazir, Majeed, Maya, Devi	Average	
28 July 1949	2 Kinaray	Social film	Urdu	Ashiq Bhatti	Akhtari, Suresh, Kalavati, Zarif	Flop	
28 July 1949	Pheray	Romantic, musical film	Punjabi	Nazir	Swaran Lata, Nazir, Zeenat, Nazar, Allauddin	Super Hit	This was Zeenat's first debut.
18 November 1949	Mundri	Social film	Punjabi	Dawood Chand	Ragni, Ilyas Kashmiri, Noor Mohammad Charlie, Zeenat	Average	The first film of famous film producers Evernew Pictures
