= Mian Aminuddin =

Pakistani politician

4th Governor of West Punjab
- In office 2 May 1953 – 24 June 1954
- Monarch: Elizabeth II
- Governor-General: Malik Ghulam Muhammad
- Preceded by: Ibrahim Ismail Chundrigar
- Succeeded by: Habib Ibrahim Rahimtoola

Personal details
- Relatives: Shah Mehmood Qureshi (granddaughter's husband); Mian Yousuf Salahuddin; Sir Mian Muhammad Shafi; Justice Sir Mian Abdul Rashid
- Occupation: Civil Servant in the British Raj and then Pakistan

Mian Aminuddin (Punjabi, Urdu: میاں امین الدین) was a Pakistani civil servant. He served the Imperial Civil Service during the British Raj and then Pakistani civil servivce after independence of Pakistan. He served as the first Mayor of Lahore. He also served as the Chief commissioner of Baluchistan between 1949 and 1952 and then as the fourth Governor of West Punjab between 1953 and 1954.

== Early life and career ==
Mian Aminuddin was among the very few and early Muslim members of the Indian Civil Service (British India).

"At independence Pakistan faced an acute shortage of experienced senior administrators. In the government of undivided India, there were only two Muslim ICS officers and one Muslim Indian Political Service (IPS) officer who had risen to the position of joint secretary, namely Mian Aminuddin (ICS, 1923), Ikramullah Khan (ICS, 1927), and Lieutenant Colonel (retired) Iskander Mirza."

In Pakistan, Mian Aminuddin later served as Governor of Punjab, Pakistan also from 2 May 1953 to 24 June 1954.

== See also ==
- Mian family of Baghbanpura

Political offices
Preceded by Sahibzada Mohammad Kursheed	Chief Commissioner of Balochistan; 16 July 1949 - 18 November 1952	Succeeded by Qurban Ali Khan
Political offices
Preceded by I.I. Chundrigar	Governor of West Punjab; 2 May 1953 - 24 June 1954	Succeeded by Habib Ibrahim Rahimtoola
