= Malik Ghulam Muhammad =

Governor-general of Pakistan from 1951 to 1956

His Excellency Sir Malik Ghulam Muhammad KCIE
- ملک غلام محمد
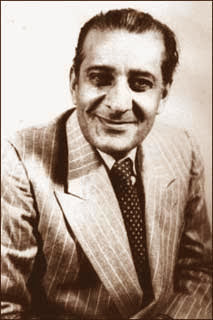

3rd Governor-General of Pakistan
- In office 17 October 1951 – 7 August 1955
- Monarchs: George VI; Elizabeth II
- Prime Minister: Khawaja Nazimuddin (1951–53); Muhammad Ali Bogra (1953–55)
- Preceded by: Khawaja Nazimuddin
- Succeeded by: Iskandar Ali Mirza

1st Minister of Finance
- In office 15 August 1947 – 19 October 1951
- Prime Minister: Liaquat Ali Khan (1947–51); Sir K. Nazimuddin (1951)
- Deputy: Muhammad Ali (1947–1948); Sir Victor Turner (1948–1951)
- Preceded by: Position established
- Succeeded by: Muhammad Ali

Personal details
- Born: 20 April 1895 Lahore, Punjab Province, British India
- Died: 29 August 1956 (aged 61) Lahore, West Pakistan, Pakistan
- Resting place: Fauji Qabrastan near CSD off Shahra-e-Faisal Karachi
- Citizenship: British India (1895–1947); Pakistan (1947–1956)
- Party: Independent
- Spouse: Badshah Begum
- Children: Two
- Education: Aligarh Muslim University (BA in Acc.)
- Occupation: Civil servant, Chartered Accountant
- Awards: Knight Bachelor; Order of the Indian Empire

Sir Malik Ghulam Muhammad (Note: Urdu: ملک غلام محمد) (20 April 1895 – 29 August 1956) was a Pakistani politician and economist who served as the third governor-general of Pakistan from 1951 to 1955. He carried out what is called a 'constitutional coup' by dismissing Khawaja Nazimuddin's government in 1953 and dissolving of the constituent assembly in 1954.

Educated at the Aligarh Muslim University (AMU), he joined the Indian Civil Service as a chartered accountant at the Indian Railway Accounts Service before being promoted to join the Ministry of Finance under Liaquat Ali Khan in 1946. After the Independence of Pakistan in 1947, he joined the Liaquat administration as the country's first Finance Minister where he helped draft the first five-year plans to alleviate the national economy. He co-founded Mahindra & Mohammed in 1945 (later Mahindra & Mahindra in 1948) with Jagdish Chandra Mahindra and Kailash Chandra Mahindra.

Following the assassination of prime minister Liaquat Ali Khan in 1951, Malik was invited to be the Governor-General by Sir Khawaja Nazimuddin who himself took over the government as Prime Minister. Nationwide violence in the aftermath of the language movement in East Bengal and religious riots in Lahore made him dismiss the Nazimuddin administration using the reserve powers to restore stability. In 1955, he was forced to resign from the post of Governor-General due to worsening of his health conditions by then-Interior Minister Iskandar Ali Mirza, who himself took control of the office. After resignation, he fought a brief but unsuccessful battle with his illness, that ultimately resulted in his death in 1956.

His personal image is viewed negatively by Pakistan's historians, criticized for giving rise to political intrigue, undermining the civilian control of the military by authorizing martial law in Pakistan, and devaluing nascent democratic norms by sacking the Constituent Assembly of Pakistan during Prime Minister Bogra's tenure.

== Biography ==
=== Family background and education ===
Malik Ghulam Muhammad was born in a Kakazai Pathan family, in suburban neighbourhood near Mochi Gate, in Lahore, Punjab, India. After completing his schooling in Lahore, he went to Aligarh in Uttar Pradesh to attend the MAO College of the Aligarh Muslim University (AMU), and was a roommate of Nazir Ahmed, a physicist and a bureaucrat. At AMU he gained a BA degree in accountancy.

=== Civil service and business interests ===
After graduating from AMU, he joined the Audit and Accounts Service in March 1920. In January 1921, he received his first official appointment as assistant audit officer with the Oudh and Rohilkhand Railway. Upon its merger into the East Indian Railway in 1925, Muhammad was briefly appointed a government executor of accounts with the Bengal and North Western Railway, serving in this capacity from January to November. Having earned a reputation as an able and competent accountant, he was then appointed to the Indian Railway Board before becoming the Controller of General Supplies and Purchase of the Indian Railways. From June 1932 to February 1934, he was attached to the administration of Bhopal State, and worked under its nawab, Hamidullah Khan. In March 1934, he returned to government service and was appointed deputy accountant-general (posts and telegraphs); in May, he was appointed as officiating deputy director-general (posts and telegraphs, finance), and was confirmed in the appointment in January 1935. In July 1936, he was appointed as officiating financial officer in the same department, was confirmed in his appointment in April 1937 and was promoted to financial officer (communications) in October.

Following the outbreak of the Second World War, Muhammad was successively appointed to increasingly important positions: chief controller of stores in March 1940, controller-general of purchase in September 1940 and additional secretary to the Department of Supply in March 1941. His wartime services as a professional accountant were recognized by the British government that year when he was appointed a Companion of the Order of the Indian Empire (CIE) in the 1941 Birthday Honours list. In May 1942, Muhammad was assigned to the Hyderabad State administration, in which he served as an advisor to the Nizam of Hyderabad.

In 1945, he helped co-found the Mahindra and Mohamed Steel Company together with steel industrialists, JC Mahindra and KC Mahindra where Muhammad served the company's chartered accountant. In 1945–47, the company initially registered as the Mahindra & Mohammad, and started the licensed production of the Willys jeeps in Bombay as Muhammad looked after the company's revenue and finances.

After World War II, he was asked by Nawab of Bahawalpur, Sir Sadeq Mohammad Khan V to represent him at the Round Table Conferences, and during this time, he began formatting political relations with Liaquat Ali Khan. He left Hyderabad to join the Ministry of Finance in 1946. In the 1946 King's Birthday Honours List, the last honours list in which Indian civil servants were recognised, he received a knighthood.

== Finance Minister (1947–51) ==
In 1946–47, Muhammad left Mahindra & Mahindra and joined the Ministry of Finance as a Cabinet Secretary under Finance Minister Liaquat Ali Khan, assisting him in drafting and preparing India's first union budget.

After witnessing the Partition of India in 1947, he decided to acquire the citizenship of Pakistan and permanently settled in his native city, Lahore, on 14 August 1947. He was brought up in the Liaquat administration when Prime Minister Liaquat Ali Khan appointed him as country's first Finance Minister. He presented the first budget and submitted the draft of the First Five-Year Plans in 1948.

In 1949, Muhammad invited leaders of the Muslim world to the International Islamic Economics Organization in Pakistan, where he emphasised the idea of a Muslim economic bloc. During this time, he survived the fatal attack of paralysis that made him unable to talk or move effectively and began experiencing with poor health conditions.

== Governor-General ==
As early as 1951, Prime Minister Liaquat Ali Khan had made a decision of removing Finance Minister Ghulam Muhammad due to his continuing worsening health conditions. However, the decision was not taken due to the assassination of Prime Minister Liaquat Ali Khan in October 1951. On 17 October 1951, Sir Khawaja Nazimuddin nominated himself to succeed as Prime Minister, appointing his own cabinet, and consequently resigned his position as Governor-General of Pakistan and recommended King George VI to appoint Muhammad to succeed him as Governor-General.

In 1953, Muhammad represented Pakistan at the Coronation of Elizabeth II in Westminster Abbey alongside the Governors-General from Canada, Australia, New Zealand, Union of South Africa and Dominion of Ceylon. Upon returning to Pakistan, he witnessed the agitation caused by the language movement in Dacca in East Pakistan, and the series of anti-Ahmadi protests in Lahore, Punjab in Pakistan. Both events led him to use the reserve powers awarded by the Government of India Act 1935 against Prime Minister Nazimuddin, effectively dismissing his administration only to be replaced with diplomat M. A. Bogra.

In 1954, the Constituent Assembly made legislative attempts to try changing the 1935 act to establish checks and balances on the Governor-General's powers. In response, Muhammad dismissed the Constituent Assembly, an action that was challenged in the Sindh High Court by Maulvi Tamizuddin, the Speaker of the Assembly. The Sindh High Court's Chief Justice Sir George Constantine ruled the Governor-General's decision unlawful, but the ruling was overturned by the Federal Court of Pakistan, led by Chief Justice Muhammad Munir, in a split decision.

Historians consider this action the beginning of viceregal politics in Pakistan, in which the military and civil bureaucracy, not elected officials, would gain increasing influence over the country's policymaking.

During this time, Muhammad's health began to deteriorate, and paralysis spread through his whole body, forcing him to take a leave of absence in 1955 to seek treatment in the United Kingdom. In his capacity, he appointed Interior Minister Iskandar Ali Mirza as acting Governor-General, but Mirza dismissed him from his post in order to take his place, supported by the Constituent Assembly's legislators.

== Death ==
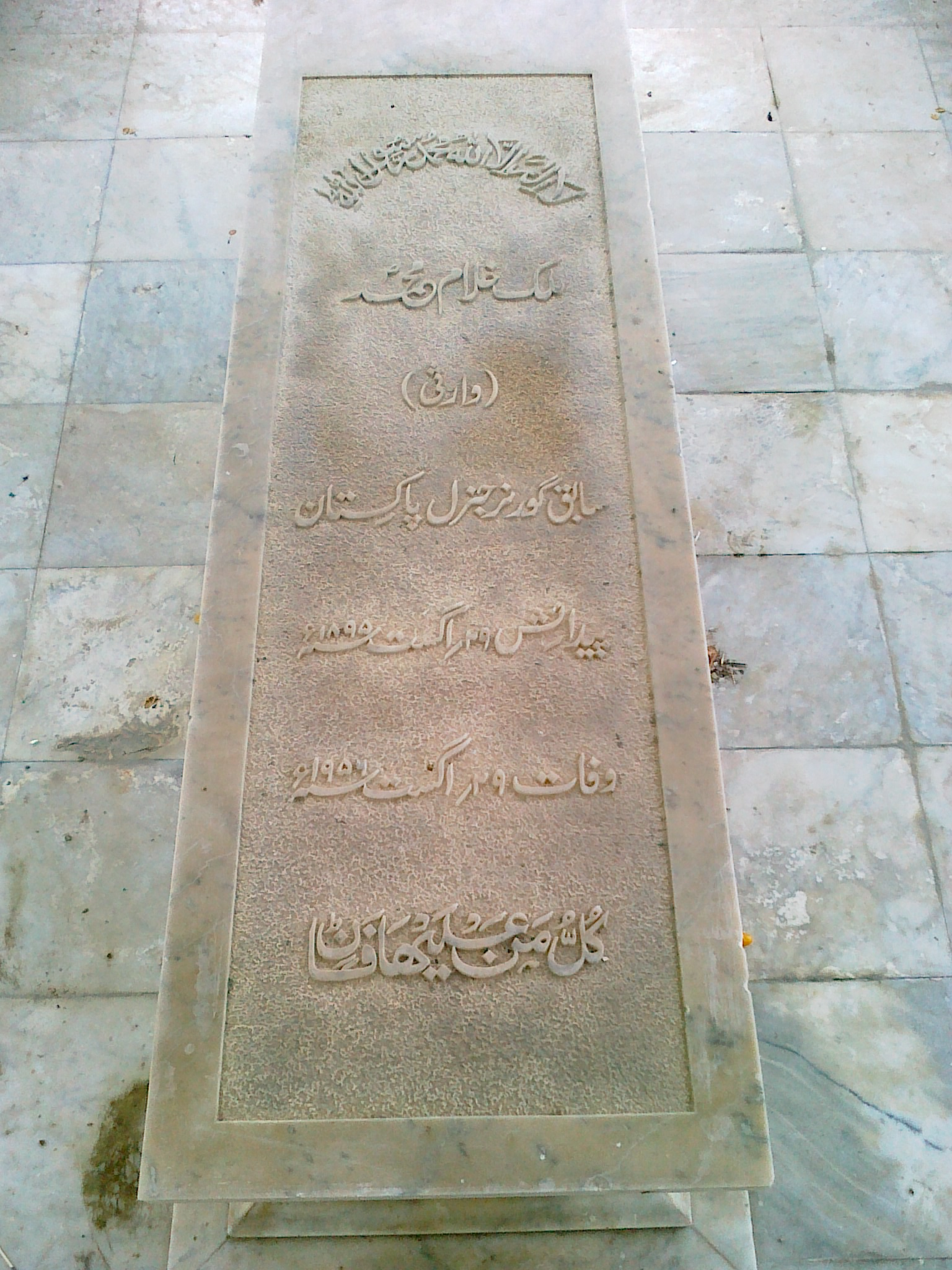
Malik's grave at Fauji Qabrastan, next to Gora Qabrastan (Christians) near CSD off Shahra-e-Faisal Karachi

On 29 August 1956, Malik Ghulam Muhammad died following long-term health complications including paralysis which had spread through his body and was buried in Karachi in Christian's Graveyard, Gora Qabristan in Karachi.

== Notes ==
Political offices
New office	Minister of Finance; 1947–1951	Succeeded by Chaudhry Muhammad Ali
Preceded by Sir Khawaja Nazimuddin	Governor-General of Pakistan; 1951–1955	Succeeded by Iskander Mirza
