= Governor-General of Pakistan =

Representative of the monarch (1947–1956)

- گورنر جنرل پاکستان
- Emblem of the Dominion of Pakistan (1947–1954)

- Emblem of the Dominion of Pakistan (1954–1956)

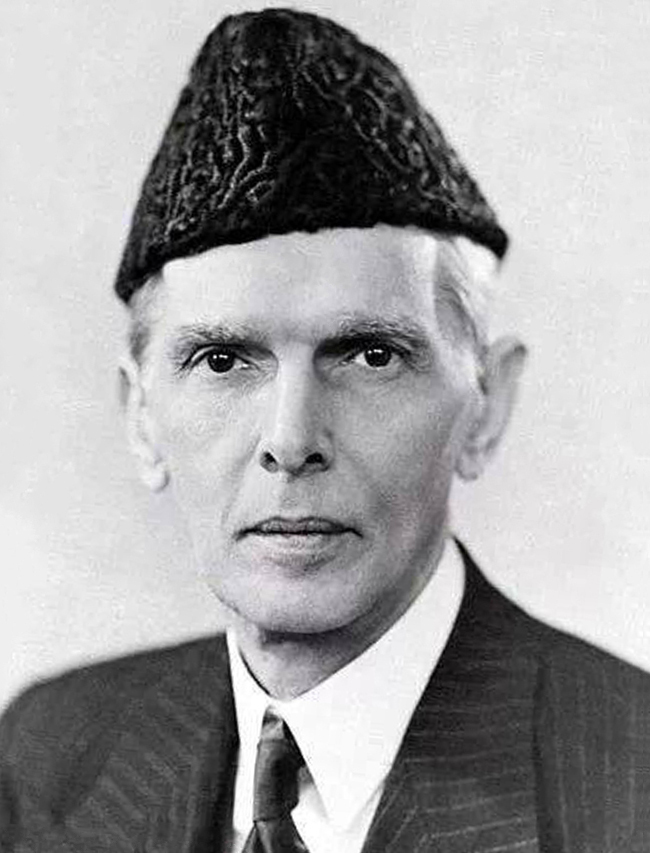
- First to serve Muhammad Ali Jinnah; 14 August 1947 – 11 September 1948
- Viceregal
- Style: His Excellency
- Type: Representative of the head of state
- Status: Abolished
- Reports to: Monarch of Pakistan
- Residence: Governor-General's House
- Seat: Karachi
- Nominator: Prime Minister of Pakistan
- Appointer: Monarch of Pakistan
- Term length: None; at the pleasure of the monarch
- Constituting instrument: Indian Independence Act 1947
- Precursor: Viceroy of British India
- Formation: 14 August 1947
- First holder: Muhammad Ali Jinnah
- Final holder: Iskander Mirza
- Abolished: 23 March 1956
- Superseded by: President of Pakistan

The governor-general of Pakistan (Note: Urdu: گورنر جنرل پاکستان, romanized: Gavarnar Janral Pākistān) was the representative of the Pakistani monarch in the Dominion of Pakistan, existing from 1947 to 1956. The office was established upon Pakistan's independence and abolished when Pakistan became a republic upon promulgation of the constitution in 1956. The governor-general represented the monarch in the Constituent Assembly as its head, and had many constitutional roles as a nominal figurehead.

== Constitutional role ==
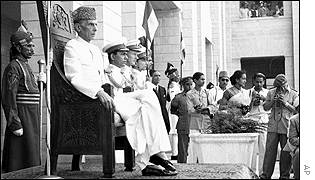
Muhammad Ali Jinnah, seated on the throne of Pakistan, carrying out official duties as the monarch's representative

In the first years after its independence, Pakistan was one of the realms of the Commonwealth of Nations that shared the same person as sovereign and head of state. The Pakistani monarch was represented in the dominion by the governor-general of Pakistan, whom the monarch appointed on the advice of the Pakistani government.

The Pakistani monarch and the Federal Legislature of Pakistan constituted the Parliament of Pakistan. All executive powers of Pakistan rested with the sovereign. All laws in Pakistan were enacted only with royal assent, granted by the governor-general on behalf of the sovereign. The governor-general was also responsible for summoning, proroguing, and dissolving the Federal Legislature. The governor-general chose and appointed the Council of Ministers and dismissed them at his discretion. All Pakistani ministers of the Crown held office at the pleasure of the governor-general. The governor-general of Pakistan was also exempted from any proceedings against him in any Pakistani court.

Akhilesh Pillalamarri of The Diplomat wrote that during the reign of Elizabeth II, Queen of Pakistan, "her governors-general were presidents of Pakistan in all but name."

== Oath of office ==
The governor-general of Pakistan was required to take an oath of allegiance to the Constitution of Pakistan and the Pakistani monarch before being permitted to assume his seat. The oath of allegiance taken by Mohammad Ali Jinnah, the first governor-general, was as follows:

"I, Mohammad Ali Jinnah, do solemnly affirm true faith and allegiance to the Constitution of Pakistan as by law established and that I will be faithful to His Majesty King George VI, in the office of Governor General of Pakistan."

== List of governors-general of Pakistan ==
The following is a list of people who served as governor-general of Pakistan.

| No. | Portrait | Name (Birth–Death) | Term of office | | | Monarch (Reign) |
| No. | Portrait | Name (Birth–Death) | Took office | Left office | Time in office | Monarch (Reign) |
|---|---|---|---|---|---|---|
| 1 | | Muhammad Ali Jinnah محمد علی جناح (1876–1948) | 14 August 1947 | 11 September 1948 | 1 year, 28 days | George VI (1947–1952) |
| Office vacant (11 September 1948 – 14 September 1948) | | | | | | George VI (1947–1952) |
| 2 | | Sir Khawaja Nazimuddin سر خواجہ ناظم الدین (1894–1964) | 14 September 1948 | 17 October 1951 | 3 years, 33 days | George VI (1947–1952) |
| 3 | | Sir Ghulam Muhammad سر غلام محمد (1895–1956) | 17 October 1951 | 7 August 1955 | 3 years, 294 days | George VI (1947–1952) |
| 3 | | Sir Ghulam Muhammad سر غلام محمد (1895–1956) | 17 October 1951 | 7 August 1955 | 3 years, 294 days | Elizabeth II (1952–1956) |
| 4 | | Iskander Mirza اسکندر مرزا (1899–1969) | 7 August 1955 | 23 March 1956 | 229 days | Elizabeth II (1952–1956) |

== Flag of the governor ==
Flag used from 1947 to 1953

Flag used from 1953 to 1956

== See also ==
- Governor-General of India
- List of presidents of Pakistan
- President of Pakistan
