= Mian Family Graveyard =

Cemetery in Lahore, Pakistan

- میاں فیملی قبرستان
- Interactive map of Mian Family Graveyard

Details
- Location: Baghbanpura, Lahore, Punjab, Pakistan
- Coordinates: 31.5840°N 74.3757°E
- Type: Private Muslim family cemetery
- Owned by: Mian Family Graveyard Committee
- Size: 14 kanal (2 acre)
- No. of graves: Notables of the Mian family, including Sir Mian Muhammad Shafi, Justice Mian Shah Din and Begum Jahan Ara

The Mian Family Graveyard (Urdu: میاں فیملی قبرستان) is a private cemetery in Lahore holds significant historical value as the resting place of numerous influential leaders from this family, such as, Mian Mouhammad Yousaf (Nazim Shalimar Gardens), Nawab Mian Muhammad Fazil, Mian Qadir Bauksh Nadir, Justice Mian Shah Din, Sir Mian Muhammad Shafi, Begum Jahan Ara, Justice Mian Sir Abdur Rashid, Mian Bashir Ahmed, and Mian Iftikharuddin.

This family was honored with the royal title of 'Mian' by the Mughal emperors due to their noteworthy contributions to the region's development. They were the rightful owners of Baghbanpura and the adjacent land, which was utilized for constructing the renowned Shalimar Gardens in Lahore. In 1641, the Mughal emperor Shah Jahan entrusted them with the custodianship of the Shalimar Gardens, further solidifying their historical significance and influence in the region.

The burial ground encompasses roughly 14 Kanals (2 acres) of private land that belonged to Mian Muhammad Yousaf, the inaugural Nazim of Shalimar Gardens, and is managed by the Graveyard Committee, comprising senior descendants of the family.

== Notable Intombed interments ==
- Mian Muhammad Yusaf aka Mehr Manga, who was appointed custodian of the famed Shalimar Gardens, Lahore by Mughals, and also received the title of 'Mian' from Mughal emperor Shah Jahan).
- Mian Qadir Baksh, poetical name being Nadir, Chief Engineer Artillery in Ranjit Singh's army.
- Justice Mian Shah Din (1868–1918) – first Muslim chief judge in British India, poet and writer.
- Sir Mian Mohammad Shafi (1869–1932) – Notable Muslim activist, barrister, Chief Judge, founded Punjab Muslim League, Proposed All India Muslim League, Member Viceroy's Executive Council.
- Mian Sir Muhammad Shah Nawaz – A politician of Punjab in the 1920s.
- Justice Sir Mian Abdul Rashid – first Chief Justice of Pakistan (1947).
- Mian Iftikharuddin – Politician, owner of Pakistan Times and Daily Imroz.
- Mian Muhammad Rafi – Secretary to the Government of India until Partition.
- Jahanara Shahnawaz (1896-1979) - Politician and Muslim League activist.
- Mumtaz Shahnawaz (1912-1948) - Political activist and author, who died in a plane crash at the age of 35 en route to represent Pakistan at the UN General Assembly, the first woman in Asia to preside over a legislative session.
