= Mian (given name) =

Mian is a given name, and can also be used as a middle name found in India and Pakistan;

== Given name ==
Notable people with the given name include:

- Mian Mir (1550-1635), a Sufi saint of Punjab region (India and Pakistan)
- Mian Muhammad Bakhsh (1830-1907), a Sufi saint and poet of Punjab
- Mian Hayaud Din (1910-1965), a major general of Pakistan
- Mian Iftikharuddin (1907-1962), a Pakistani leftist leader
- Mian Arqam Khan, Pakistani politician
- Mian Altaf Ahmed Larvi (born 1957), Indian politicians
- Mian Muhammad Shahnawaz, Politicians from Punjab
- Mian Muhammad Shafi (1869-1932), was a lawyer and politicians from British India
- Mian Muhammad Latif (born 1947), Is a Pakistani politician and businessman
- Mian Mian (born 1970), a Chinese writer
- Muhammad Mian Soomro (born 1950), a politician and former Chairman of the Senate of Pakistan
- Mian Amer Mahmood (born 1960), a politician from Pakistan
- Mian Yousuf Salahuddin (born 1951), is Pakistani socialite, philanthropist, and ex-politician
- Mian Muhammad Azhar (1944-2025), is a Pakistani politician and businessman
- Mian Muhammad Munir (born 1954), is a Pakistani politician
- Mian Muhammad Umar, Pakistani politician
- Nawaz Sharif (Mian Nawaz Sharif) (born 1949), ex-prime minister of Pakistan
- Mian Shahbaz Sharif (born 1951), Prime Minister of Pakistan

== See also ==
- Shrine of Mian Mir
- Mian (disambiguation)
- Mia (disambiguation)
- Mi (disambiguation)
- Mian Sahib
