= Mian =

Mian may refer to:

== People and languages ==
- Mian people, people in Telefomin district, Sanduan province, Papua New Guinea
  - Mian language, spoken in Telefomin district, Sanduan, Papua New Guinea
- Mian people (Australia), an indigenous people of Queensland
- Mian (clan), Rajput clan of Kashmir
- Mian Arain (surname), Pakistani Punjabi noble Arain family
- Mian (given name), including a list of people with the given name
- Mian (surname), including a list of people with the given name
- Mian family of Baghbanpura, a noble Arain family of Lahore, Pakistan
- Mian (title), is an Indian noble title

== Places ==
- Mian, Punjab, a village in Mansa district, Indian Punjab
- Mian Channu, a city in Khanewal District, Pakistani Punjab
- Mian Channu Tehsil, an administrative subdivision of Khanewal District, Pakistani Punjab
- Mian Wali Qureshian, a town in Rahim Yar Khan District, Pakistani Punjab
- Mian (Amieva), a parish in Amieva, Spain
- Mian County, a county of Hanzhong, Shaanxi, China
- Mian Deh, Badakhshan, Afghanistan

== See also ==
- Miah, a Bengali word of similar origin
- Steklov Institute of Mathematics
- Mian–Chowla sequence, in mathematics
- Mian Quan, a martial arts in Hebei province of northern China
