= Nasim Jahan =

Pakistani politician and women's activist

Member of the National Assembly of Pakistan
- In office 1971–1976

Personal details
- Born: Nasim Shahnawaz Lahore, Punjab, Pakistan
- Party: Pakistan People's Party (PPP)
- Spouse: Akbar Khan (divorced)
- Parents: Mian Muhammad Shahnawaz (father); Jahanara Shahnawaz (mother)
- Relatives: Mumtaz Shahnawaz (sister)
- Occupation: activist and politician

Nasim Jahan (born: Nasim Shahnawaz, marital name: Nasim Akbar Khan) was a women's activist and a politician of the Pakistan Peoples Party. She was married to General Akbar Khan and played a key role, largely unknown, in the First Kashmir War. She was accused as a co-conspirator in the Rawalpindi Conspiracy Case but acquitted. Later she became a founding member of the Pakistan Peoples Party and was elected to the National Assembly of Pakistan and contributed to the formulation of the Constitution of Pakistan.

Nasim Jahan was the daughter of Mian Muhammad Shahnawaz and Begum Jahanara Shahnawaz of the elite Mian family of Baghbanpura.

== Family ==
Nasim Jahan was born Nasim Shahnawaz in the prominent Mian family of Baghbanpura. Her parents Mian Muhammad Shahnawaz and Begum Jahanara Shahnawaz were both politicians, and so was her maternal grandfather Sir Muhammad Shafi. Begum Jahanara was one of the first Indian Muslim women to abandon the veil and pursue high education. She participated in the Round Table Conferences as the sole representative of Indian Muslim women. Nasim's elder sister Mumtaz Shahnawaz was also an activist and politician, who died in an air crash while on her way to represent Pakistan in the United Nations.

== Activism, 1947–1959 ==
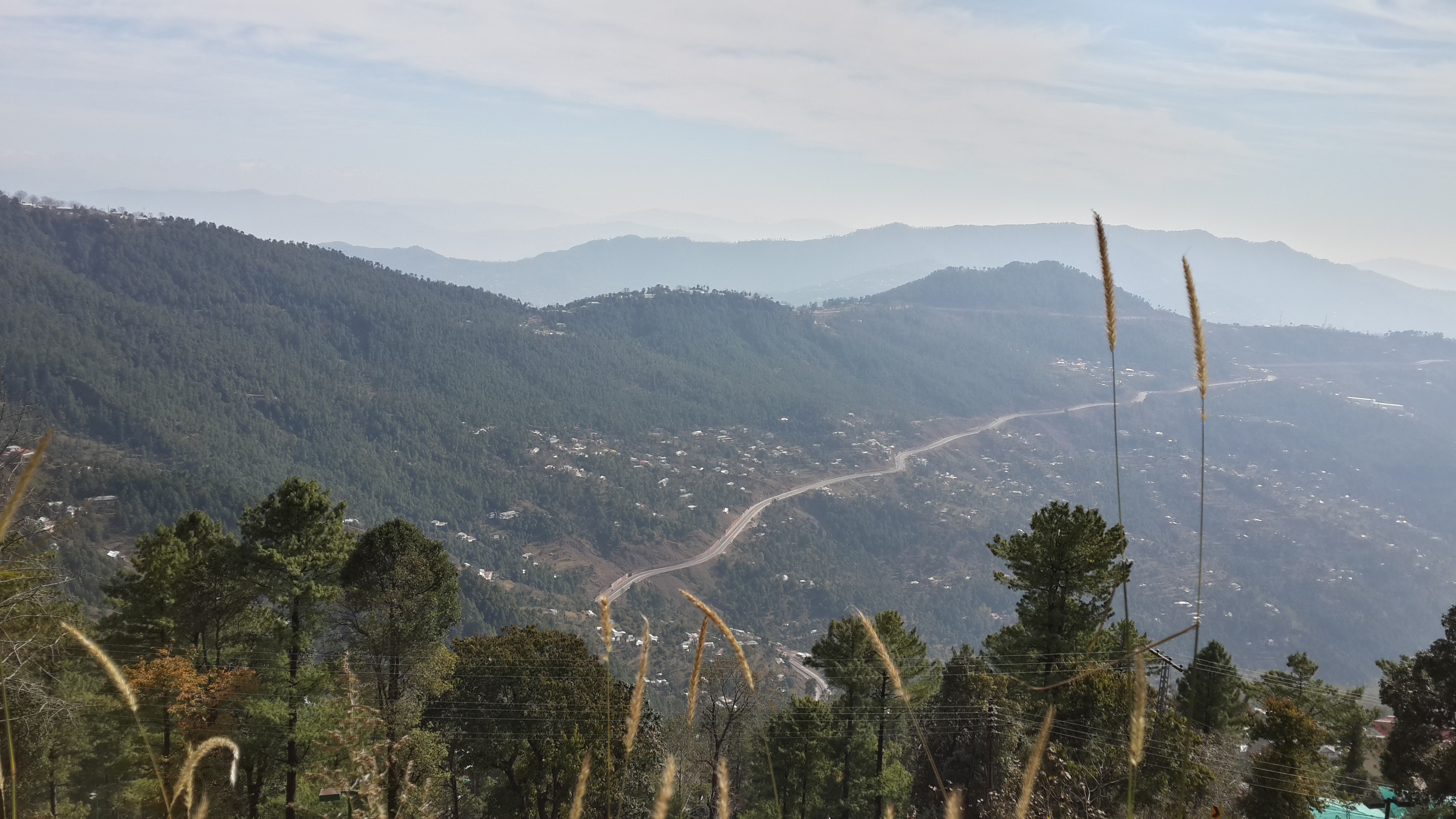
Murree, overlooking Kashmir

Murree and western Kashmir

Nasim Shahnawaz married Colonel Akbar Khan, who became a decorated war hero in World War II. Nasim is often described as ambitious and well-connected, and having been a significant influence on Akbar Khan's activities.

Her activism came to the fore soon after the Partition of India, during the Kashmir conflict. Akbar Khan, who was apparently part of a plan to capture Kashmir by invasion, wondered how to influence Pakistan's political leadership to back it. Soon he came in contact with Mian Iftikharuddin, a leader of the Muslim League in Punjab and a cousin of Nasim, and Sardar Ibrahim Khan, an activist of Kashmir's Muslim Conference who was looking to launch a rebellion against the Maharaja of Kashmir and seeking Pakistan's help. In a 12 September planning meeting with the prime minister Liaquat Ali Khan, both Iftikharuddin and Akbar Khan participated.

After this meeting, Akbar Khan was barred from participating in Pakistan's covert action, but Nasim seems to have been closely involved. She attended a meeting in Murree towards the end of September, where Khurshid Anwar briefed the Muslim Conference activists about the invasion plan. On 23 October, the day after the tribal invasion was launched, she and the Commissioner of Rawalpindi Division, Khawaja Abdur Rahim, went to announce to Sardar Ibrahim that he was to be the President of the Azad Kashmir provisional government. During the evidence presented to a tribunal later in the 1950s, a witness mentioned that she and her sister (Mumtaz Shahnawaz) appeared to have "sponsored" Sardar Ibrahim to be the leader. (Note: Up to this point, Sardar Ibrahim had the designation of prime minister in the provisional government. The president, who was publicly announced under the pseudonym "Mr. Anwar", is believed to have been Ghulam Nabi Gilkar, who went to Srinagar and got arrested by the Maharaja's government.)

After the first phase of the invasion, Akbar Khan was given the charge of commanding the invasion. He assumed the nom de guerre of 'General Tariq' and moved to Murree, where he lived with Nasim and established his operational headquarters. When Captain Wajahat Hussain visited the couple on one occasion, he found Akbar Khan talking in even tones, but Nasim is said to have loudly complained about lack of support from the government and the Army headquarters.

After this assignment, Akbar Khan was sent to command the Kohat Brigade. The Kashmir War ended in a ceasefire on 1 January 1949. It is said that Nasim and Akbar Khan entertained lavishly in Kohat, inviting other military officers, and discussing world politics and government inefficiency. Akbar Khan is said to have openly canvassed for a military dictatorship. Nasim brought to the table her leftist and communist contacts, including Faiz Ahmad Faiz, who was said to be close a friend. The government was on to them before long, and a special Deputy Inspector General of police was assigned specifically to investigate the interactions between Faiz and Nasim.

By 1951, Akbar Khan was promoted to Major General, and appointed as the Chief of General Staff. It is said that the new commander-in-chief, General Ayub Khan, kept him in the General Headquarters in order to monitor his activities. Between 9 and 10 March, Nasim and Akbar Khan, Faiz and several other army officers deemed to have been part of the conspiracy were arrested. A Special Tribunal conducted trials for what came to be known as the Rawalpindi Conspiracy Case, and delivered a verdict in January 1953. Nasim Akbar Khan was acquitted but Akbar Khan received a twelve-year prison sentence.

Akbar Khan and Nasim were divorced in 1959. Afterwards, Nasim took "Jahan" as her last name.

== Activism in the 1970s ==
Nasim Jahan was a founding member of the Pakistan People's Party, founded by Zulfikar Ali Bhutto in 1967. During the 1970 general election, she motivated and mobilised Punjabi women, especially from Lahore, in democratic participation. She was elected to the National Assembly from a reserved constituency for women. She was selected by Bhutto, along with Begum Ashraf Abbasi, for the Constitution Committee, to formulate a new constitution for Pakistan. She fought for retaining the principle of female suffrage for the reserved women's seats, but was unsuccessful in carrying it through the National Assembly. But the constitution ensured some social and political rights to women through articles 25, 32, 34, 35 and 2238.

== Bibliography ==
- Asdar Ali, Kamran (2015), Communism in Pakistan: Politics and Class Activism 1947-1982, I.B.Tauris, ISBN 978-0-85773-995-7
  - Asdar Ali, Kamran (2015a), Communism in Pakistan: Politics and Class Activism 1947-1982, Bloomsbury Publishing, ISBN 9780857726759
- Joshi, Manoj (2008), Kashmir, 1947-1965: A Story Retold, India Research Press, ISBN 978-81-87943-52-5
- Pirbhai, M. Reza (2017), Fatima Jinnah, Cambridge University Press, ISBN 978-1-107-19276-8
- Awan, Shehzadi Zamurrad (2016), "Political Discourse and Socio-Cultural Placement of Pakistani Women 1947-1976: A Historical Perspective" (PDF), Journal of the Research Society of Pakistan, 53 (1)
- Shami, Asma Afzal (2009), "Political Empowerment of Women in Pakistan" (PDF), Journal of Pakistan Vision, 10 (1)
- Zaheer, Hasan (1998), The Times and Trial of the Rawalpindi Conspiracy, 1951: The First Coup Attempt in Pakistan, Oxford University Press, ISBN 978-0-19-577892-2
  - Zaheer, Hasan (2007) [first published by Oxford University Press Pakistan in 1998], The Times and Trial of the Rawalpindi Conspiracy, 1951: The First Coup Attempt in Pakistan, Sang-e-Meel Publishers, ISBN 978-969-35-1992-1
