= Mumtaz Shahnawaz =

Pakistani diplomat (1912–1948)

Mumtaz Shahnawaz (1912–1948) was a Pakistani diplomat and writer. She had held degrees in English literature.

== Family ==
She was born to the Arain Mian family of Baghbanpura. Her father was Mian Muhammad Shahnawaz and mother Begum Jahanara Shahnawaz, both prominent and politically active persons of present-day Pakistan. Her maternal grandfather, Sir Muhammad Shafi, was an influential leader from Punjab.

== Pakistan Movement ==
Like her mother, Mumtaz Shahnawaz was drawn into the national movement as a Congress member but slowly shifted her sympathies towards to the All-India Muslim League. Mumtaz or Tanzee as she was known to her family and friends was greatly influenced by Jinnah. Mumtaz Shahnawaz died at the age of 35 in a plane crash months after the creation of Pakistan, en route to New York to represent Pakistan at the UN General Assembly, the first woman in Asia to preside over a legislative session.

== Literary skills ==
Her novel, The Heart Divided was probably the first novel on the theme of the partition of India. It tells the story of a Muslim family in North India during the 1940s. It provides a detailed account of Independence and Partition, though it stops short of the Partition riots. Upon her death, Shahnawaz left behind a first draft of the novel, which her family published in the edited form 11 years later.

== Death ==
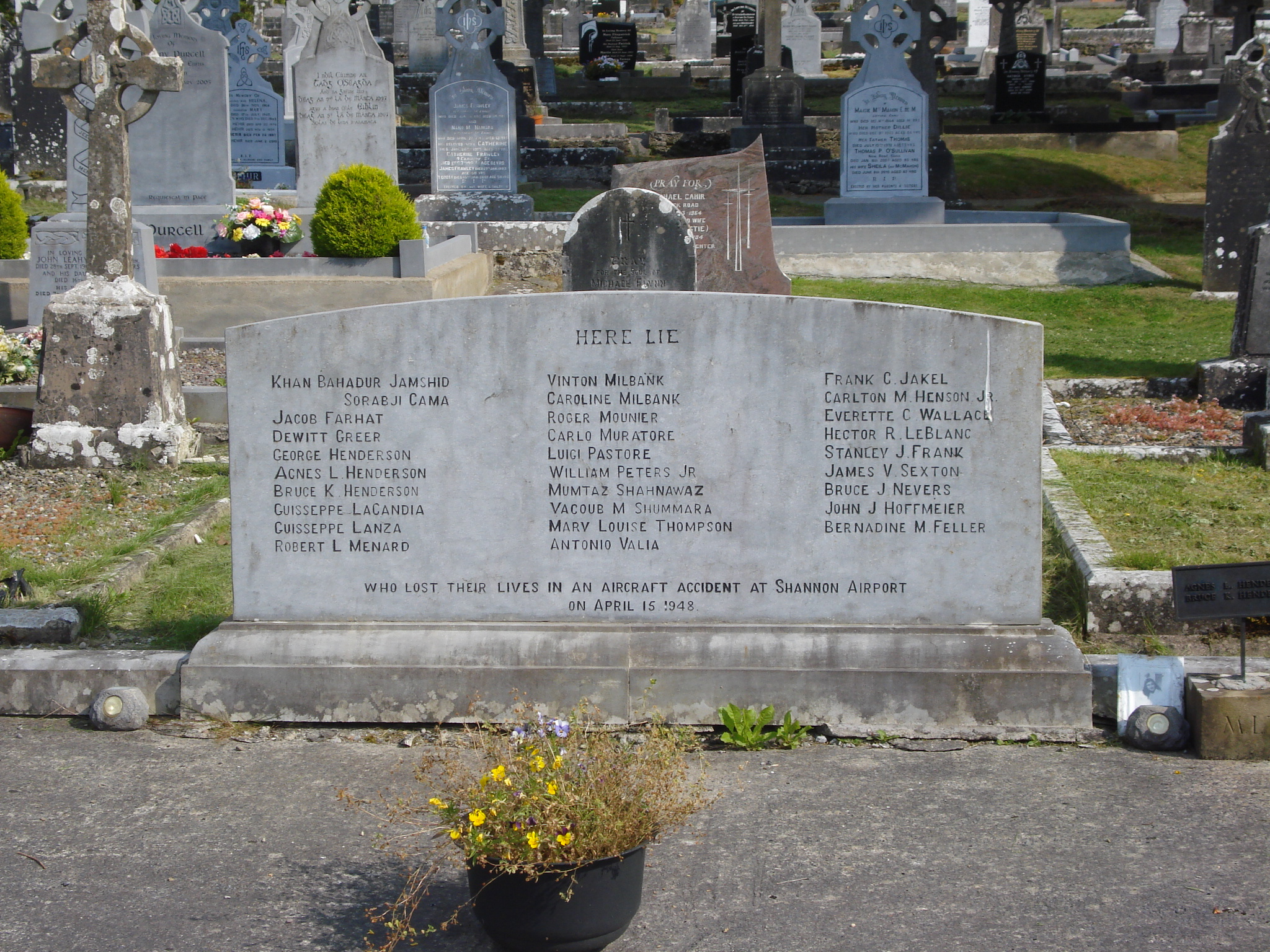
Mumtaz Shahnawaz was interred in a communal plot alongside other victims of the crash in Drumcliff cemetery in Ennis, County Clare, Ireland.

Shahnawaz died in 1948 in the crash of Pan Am Flight 1-10.

== Scholarship ==
Shahnawaz’s unfinished novel The Heart Divided has been studied for its depiction of nationalism, Partition, and women’s roles in the independence movement. Recent doctoral research has analyzed her work through the frameworks of feminist geography and memory studies, situating it within Muslim women’s Partition narratives that explore how spaces of home, city, and nation are reshaped in times of trauma and transition.

== See also ==
- Arain
- Mian Family Baghbanpura
