= Drumcliffe =

Drumcliffe is an alternative spelling of Drumcliff and can refer to:

- Drumcliff - village in County Sligo, Ireland
- Drumcliff, County Clare - a civil parish including Inch and part of Ennis, County Clare, Ireland
- Drumcliffe/Rosses Point GAA, a football club in north County Sligo, Ireland
