= Ó Midhir =

Ó Midhir, aka Ó Meidhir, Irish surname, now rendered Meere, Meer,Mears, Myers, Meyers.

This family have been described as "an obscure lineage associated with the Irish church ... of Drumcliff parish, one of the Gaelic learned lineages who served as a unique caste of hereditary literati and guardians of customary law and tradition."

See also: Midir or Midhir
