= Mian family of Baghbanpura =

Family

The Mian family of Baghbanpura is a feudal family of Punjabi Arain descent from Baghbanpura, Lahore, Pakistan, which was politically prominent in the early-20th century. The family originally owned the private land in Baghbanpura on which the Shalimar Gardens were later built. The Mian family offered their land to the Mughal Emperor, Shah Jahan for the construction of gardens and in return the custodianship of Shalimar Gardens was granted to the family in 1641, which they held for over 350 years.

== Notable Members ==
- Mian Muhammad Yusaf aka Mehr Manga (1635–1720) — who was appointed custodian of the famed Shalimar Gardens, Lahore by Mughals, and also received the title of 'Mian' from Mughal emperor Shah Jahan)
- Mian Qadir Baksh (1799–1881) — poetical name being Nadir, Chief Engineer Artillery in Ranjit Singh's army.
- Justice Mian Shah Din (1868–1918) — first Muslim chief judge in British India, poet and writer.
- Sir Mian Mohammad Shafi (1869–1932) — Notable Muslim activist, barrister, Chief Judge, founded Punjab Muslim League, proposed All India Muslim League, Member Viceroy's Executive Council.
- Mian Sir Muhammad Shah Nawaz (1883–1955) — A politician of Punjab in the 1920s.
- Justice Sir Mian Abdul Rashid (1889–1980) — first Chief Justice of Pakistan (1947).
- Mian Iftikharuddin (1891–1960) — Politician, owner of Pakistan Times and Daily Imroz
- Mian Muhammad Rafi — Secretary to the Government of India until Partition.
- Jahanara Shahnawaz (1896–1979) — Politician and Muslim League activist.
- Mumtaz Shahnawaz (1912–1948) — Political activist and author, who died in a plane crash at the age of 35 en route to represent Pakistan at the UN General Assembly, the first woman in Asia to preside over a legislative session.
- Nasim Shahnawaz (1916–1983) — A writer, politician and women rights activist. She was married to General Akbar Khan. She was also indicted in Rawalpindi Conspiracy Case. Later she joined Pakistan Peoples Party and became a member of National Assembly.
- Irfan Qadir (1955–present) — A Pakistani lawyer and jurist who became the 29th Attorney General for Pakistan. He also held the office of Special Assistant to the Prime Minister for accountability, interior and law with the rank and status of a federal minister. He is presently serving as legal consultant to the President of Pakistan.
