= Ejaz Ahmed Samma =

Pakistani Politician

- اعجاز احمد سما

Member of the Provincial Assembly of the Punjab
- In office 21 November 2002 – 15 November 2007
- Constituency: PP-104 Gujranwala-XIV

Personal details
- Born: April 22, 1961 (age 65) Wazirabad, Gujranwala District, Punjab, Pakistan
- Relations: Chaudhry Muhammad Anwar Samma (uncle)
- Parent: Chaudhry Muhammad Shafi Samma (father)
- Education: Bachelor of Arts; Bachelor of Laws (LL.B.)
- Alma mater: Punjab Law College
- Occupation: Politician
- Profession: An agriculturist and a businessman

Chaudhry Ejaz Ahmed Samma is a Pakistani Politician who has been Member of Provinical Assembly of Punjab from PP-104 (Gujranwala-XIV) in 2002-2007.

== Early life ==
He was born in April 22, 1961 at Wazirabad, District Gujranwala to Chaudhry Muhammad Shafi Samma. He graduated in 1983 from Punjab Law College and has a degree of Bachelor of Laws LL. B. He also Holds B.A qualification. He is Nephew of Chaudhry Muhammad Anwar Samma.

== Political career ==
He was elected as Member of Provinical Assembly of Punjab from PP-104 (Gujranwala-XIV) with 29204 Votes as an Candidate of PPP.
