= Queen Mary's College =

Queen Mary's College may refer to:

- Queen Mary's College, Basingstoke, a sixth-form college in Basingstoke, Hampshire, England
- Queen Mary's College, Chennai, a tertiary college for women in Chennai, India
- Queen Mary College, Lahore, a girls' school in Lahore, Pakistan
- Queen Mary University of London, a university in London, England, formerly known as Queen Mary College
