= Rawalpindi conspiracy =

1951 attempted coup in Pakistan

The Rawalpindi Conspiracy
- Part of Military coups in Pakistan
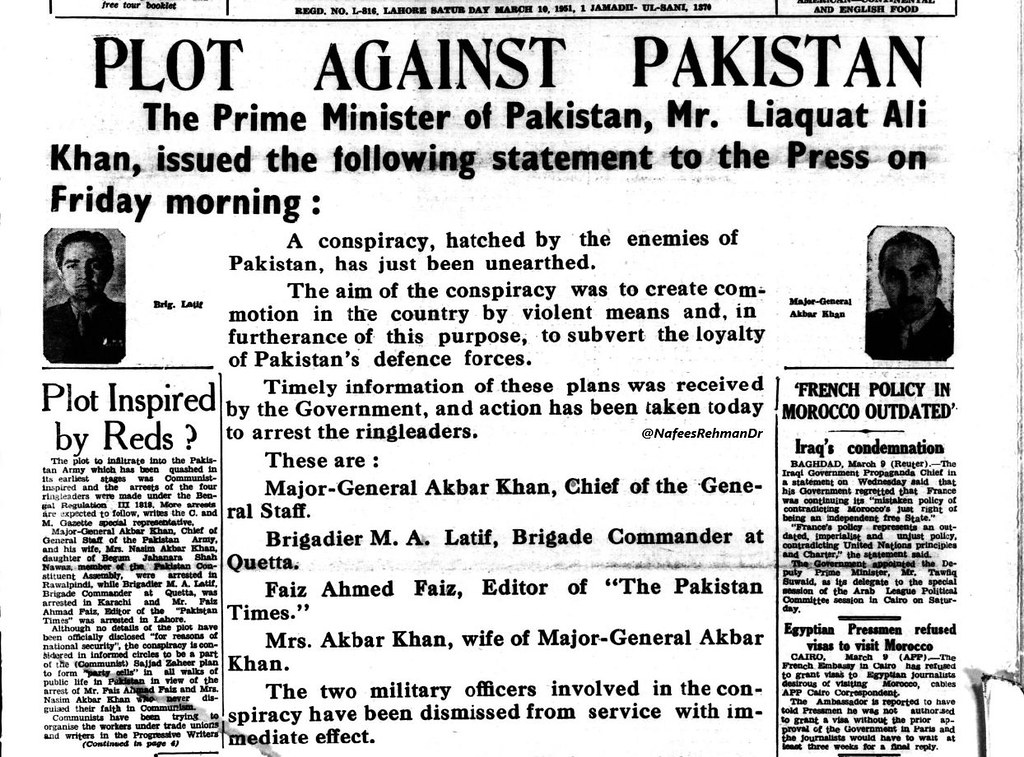
- The Pakistan Times headline on 10 March 1951, announcing the arrests of suspected ringleaders in the conspiracy
Date	March 1951
Location	Rawalpindi, West Punjab, Pakistan
Result	Plot discovered: Coup plotters arrested

Belligerents
(Pakistan) Pakistani government	Army dissidents Communist Party of Pakistan

Commanders and leaders
(Pakistan) Liaquat Ali Khan; Ayub Khan	Akbar Khan; Sajjad Zaheer; Faiz Ahmad Faiz

The Rawalpindi conspiracy was an attempted coup to overthrow the government of Liaquat Ali Khan, the first Prime Minister of Pakistan, in March 1951. It was the first of many subsequent coup attempts against governments in the history of Pakistan. The coup was notably planned by military general Akbar Khan, poet Faiz Ahmad Faiz, and writer Sajjad Zaheer, along with 12 others.

== Causes ==
According to writer Hasan Zaheer, there were three main causes of the Rawalpindi conspiracy. First, general discontent of Pakistani army officers with the performance of the Liaquat Ali Khan government, which they thought of as corrupt and incompetent. Second, the view of many Pakistani officers that the continuing presence of British officers in the Pakistan army was a security threat. Third, and most immediately, discontent with the government's handling of the Kashmir war with India (1947–1948). Army officers thought the government's acceptance of UN mediation and ceasefire was weak and squandered an opportunity to capture the whole of Kashmir.

== Participants ==
Eleven military officers and four civilians were involved in the conspiracy. The main person responsible for planning the coup was Maj. Gen. Akbar Khan, the chief of general staff of the Pakistani army. During the Kashmir War, Khan had led the Pakistani forces under the pseudonym of "General Tariq." He was based in the northern city of Rawalpindi, where the army headquarters were located, while the political capital of the state was in the southern city of Karachi at the time. The civilian conspirators included leading Pakistani poet Faiz Ahmed Faiz, who was notably active in left-wing politics and sympathetic to the Communist Party of Pakistan, and Sajjad Zaheer. Akbar Khan's wife, Naseem Shahnawaz Khan, was also believed to have motivated her husband to undertake this plot.

On 23 February 1951, a secret meeting was held at General Akbar's home, attended by other communist officers and communist party members, including Marxist Sajjad Zaheer and communist Faiz. General Akbar assured Faiz and Zaheer that the communist party would be allowed to function as a legitimate political party like any other party and to take part in the elections. But, according to communist Zafar Poshni, who maintained, in 2011, that "no agreement was reached, the plan was disapproved, the communists weren't ready to accept General's words and the participants dispersed without meeting again". However, the next morning, the plot was foiled when one of the communist officers defected to the ISI, revealing the motives behind the plot. When the news reached the prime minister, orders for massive arrests were given to the military police by the prime minister. Before the coup could be initiated, General Akbar among other communists were arrested, including Faiz.

== Exposure and trial ==
The conspiracy was foiled after the government was informed of the coup attempt by one of the confidantes of Akbar Khan. Government forces immediately arrested Maj. Gen. Akbar Khan and the other conspirators, including Faiz Ahmed Faiz. The army commander-in-chief, General Ayub Khan, and the defence secretary, Maj. Gen. Iskander Mirza, had both remained loyal to the government. Ayub Khan immediately ordered the army troops to surround and take control of the army headquarters, where Maj. Gen. Akbar Khan was based. Prime Minister Liaquat Ali Khan announced the foiling of the coup on 9 March 1951. The government passed the Rawalpindi Conspiracy (Special Tribunal) Act to set up a special tribunal to investigate the conspiracy. A trial was held for the 15 individuals accused, namely – Maj. Gen. Akbar Khan, Air Commodore M. K. Janjua, Maj. Gen. Nazir Ahmed, Brigadier Sadiq Khan, Brigadier M. A. Latif Khan, Lt. Col. Zia-ud-Din, Lt. Col. Niaz Muhammad Arbab, Captain Khizar Hayat, Maj. Hassan Khan, Major Ishaq Muhammad, Captain Zafrullah Poshni, Mrs. Naseem Shahnawaz Khan, Faiz Ahmed Faiz, Syed Sajjad Zaheer, and Muhammad Hussain Ata.

After an 18-month trial conducted in secrecy, Maj. Gen. Khan and Faiz Ahmed Faiz were both convicted and sentenced to long terms of imprisonment. Their defence lawyer was the notable Bengali Muslim politician Huseyn Shaheed Suhrawardy. When Suhrawardy became the Prime Minister of Pakistan in 1957, he obtained a reprieve for most of the conspirators.

== Aftermath ==
Liaquat Ali Khan was assassinated later in 1951, in October, in an unrelated attack by an Afghan national in Rawalpindi. Gen. Ayub Khan launched the first successful military coup against the government of President Iskander Mirza in 1958, assuming the reins of the presidency himself until 1969.

Major General Akbar Khan was rehabilitated in Pakistani political life, becoming an adviser to Pakistani politician Zulfikar Ali Bhutto. Upon coming to power in 1971, Bhutto appointed Akbar Khan as the chief of national security. Naseem Shahnawaz and Akbar Khan were divorced, and the former changed her name to Naseem Jahan (after her mother Jahanara Shahnawaz) and became a politician in her own right. Faiz continued to publish many works of poetry, and was appointed to the National Council for Arts by the Bhutto government.
