= Queen Mary College, Lahore =

Women's college in Lahore, Pakistan

Coordinates: 31°33′46″N 74°20′28″E

- کالج ملکه میری، لاہور
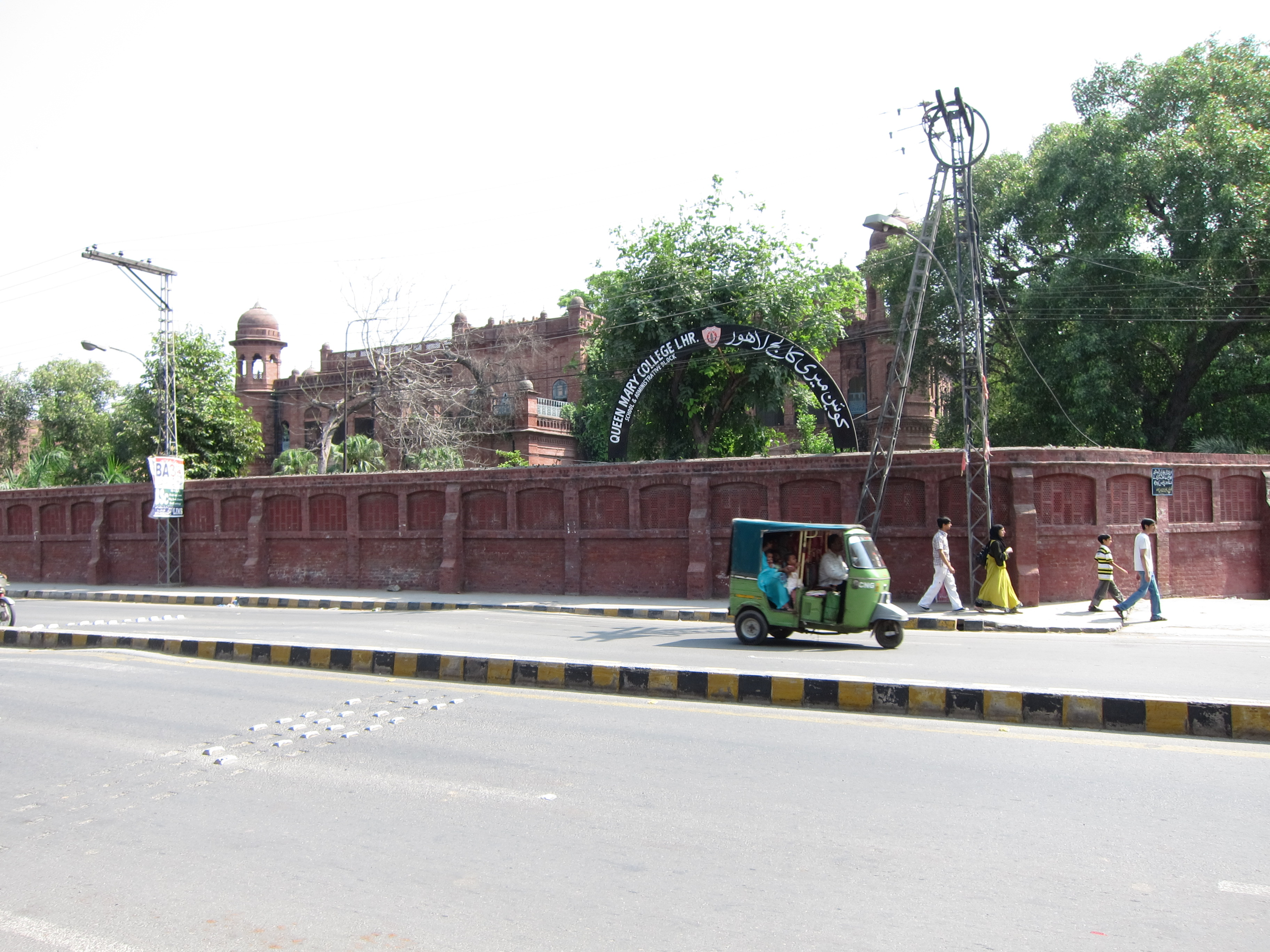
- Type: Public (Autonomous)
- Established: 1908
- Principal: Sidra Aamir
- Location: Lahore, Punjab, Pakistan
- Campus: Urban
- Website: qmc.edu.pk

Queen Mary College (QMC), officially known as Government Queen Mary Graduate College, is an autonomous college for girls in Lahore, Punjab, Pakistan.

It was established on December 10, 1908, as Victoria May Girls High School and renamed in honor of the Queen Consort of King George V in 1911. Although it was renamed Queen Mary College in 1911, the first college-level class, the Intermediate (Arts) class, commenced in 1955. The college expanded to become a degree-granting college in 1966. The college historically functioned in conjunction with Aitchison College, serving as a counterpart for daughters of the elite. This arrangement necessitated coordinated schedules and holidays. Initially, the college also admitted young boys in the Junior Section up to class V.

Queen Mary College provides preschool, primary, secondary, undergraduate as well as postgraduate education and preparation for international GCE O Level examination.

== History ==
=== 1908–1962: British administration ===
Its inception dates back to the late 19th century, evolving from the social and educational dynamics of British India. The college was established as a counterpart to Aitchison College, a school founded in 1886 for the sons of rulers of princely states and feudal chiefs, addressing the demand for a similar institution for their daughters.

The college's establishment is documented in Jahanara Shahnawaz's book Father and Daughter. Following a financial endowment by King George V during his visit to India as Prince of Wales, local leaders in Lahore, including Sir Muhammad Shafi and Sir Shah Din, advocated for the creation of a girls' school. This led to the formation of a fund-raising committee and the eventual opening of QMC in 1908 in rented premises on Hall Road, Lahore.

In 1912, the college relocated to a purpose-built campus, designed by Bhai Ram Singh, who was also responsible for the design of Aitchison College and other notable buildings.

The history of QMC can be categorized into three periods: the British era (1908–1962), the mid era (1962–1998), and the present era from 1998 onwards. During the British era, the college established a set of educational, social, and religious norms and included a hostel for students. The curriculum was predominantly in English and included works by authors such as Shakespeare and John Keats. The college was overseen by an advisory committee comprising prominent women of the time.

Facilities at QMC during this period included a canteen, a health clinic, and a tailor's shop. Traditions such as the annual sports day on Founder's Day and summer swimming galas were established.

QMC's leadership was predominantly British until 1962, with A. J. Edgley serving as the first principal.

=== 1962–present: Local administration ===
After Mrs. Clayton's tenure as the last British principal of Queen Mary College (QMC), Lahore, major administrative and educational changes occurred with the appointment of Mrs. M. B. Hassan, the first principal appointed by the Education Department of the Government of Punjab. One of the major changes was the induction of teaching staff from other government institutions, leading to an increase in the student body at QMC.

In 1977, in accordance with a policy directive from the Department of Education, Government of Punjab, the medium of instruction in all government educational institutions, including QMC, was switched from English to Urdu, except for subjects such as physics, chemistry, and biology.

The college also came under the direct supervision of the Punjab Education Department, which led to frequent staff transfers from other Urdu-medium schools. The proficiency in English of the newly transferred staff, particularly for subjects that continued to be taught in English, varied, as many originated from Urdu-medium educational backgrounds.

In 1998, the college was granted autonomy by the Government of Punjab, as per notification No. S.O.(BOARDS) AB-2—15/96 dated March 25, 1998. This autonomy included both administrative and financial independence.

== Administration ==
The college is governed by the Board of Governors, chaired by the Education Minister of Punjab. The principal of the college serves as the secretary to the board. Additionally, the board includes permanent members from the Punjab Government's higher education and finance departments and nine non-official members appointed by the Governor of Punjab for a term of three years.

Since its transition to autonomy, QMC has had four Boards of Governors. The governance structure includes several committees: the executive committee, academic committee, finance and development committee, selection committee, and promotion committee. Decisions within these committees and the Board of Governors are made according to the rules set by the Government of Punjab.

== Academics ==
Education is imparted from Class 1 to the postgraduate level. It comprises four sections and each section is supervised by a section head. The principal is the chief administrator. The sections are Junior, Senior, college and the Postgraduate Section.

== Notable alumni ==
- Zartaj Gul, Pakistani politician
- Indira Devi of Kapurthala, Indian socialite
- Begum Mahmooda Salim Khan, Pakistani social worker
- Faiza Ahmad Malik, Pakistani politician
- Maya Ali, Pakistani actress
- Zohra Sehgal, Indian actress
- Jahanara Shahnawaz, Pakistani politician
- Mamoon Rashid Sheikh, Pakistani jurist

== See also ==
- Kinnaird College for Women
- Queen Mary's College, Chennai
