= Mohammad Ali Jinnah University =

University in Karachi, Pakistan

Coordinates: 24.8602°N 67.0699°E

- جامعہ محمد علی جناح}
- Type: Private
- Established: 1998
- Affiliations: Higher Education Commission (Pakistan); Pakistan Engineering Council; Association of Commonwealth Universities
- Chancellor: Mian Amer Mahmood
- President: Zubair Sheikh
- Students: 20000+
- Location: Karachi, Sindh, Pakistan
- Campus: Urban
- Colors: Blue, white, red,
- Nickname: MAJU
- Website: jinnah.edu

The Mohammad Ali Jinnah University (Urdu: جامعہ محمد علی جناح), abbreviated as MAJU) is a private university located in Karachi, Sindh, Pakistan.

Established in 1998, the university offers undergraduate and post-graduate programs with a strong emphasis on business management, applied sciences, engineering and computer science.

== Recognized university ==
Recognized by the Higher Education Commission (Pakistan).

In addition, the university is a member of the Association of Commonwealth Universities of the United Kingdom.

== Additional campuses ==
The university operated an additional campus in Islamabad, but it changed into Capital University of Science & Technology (CUST) in 2015. Now CUST is separate from MAJU, Karachi and under the MAJU Trust.

== History ==
Mohammad Ali Jinnah University was granted its charter by the government of Sindh in 1998. The Islamabad campus was established after obtaining an NOC from UGC, dated 17 August 1998 and dated 29 November 2001 and NOC from HEC dated 27 September 2003. (now become a separate university CUST Islamabad)

== See also ==
- Punjab Group of Colleges
- Punjab College of Business Administration
- Punjab Law College
- University of Central Punjab, Lahore
- Capital University of Science & Technology, Islamabad
