= Mian Amer Mahmood =

Politician from Pakistan

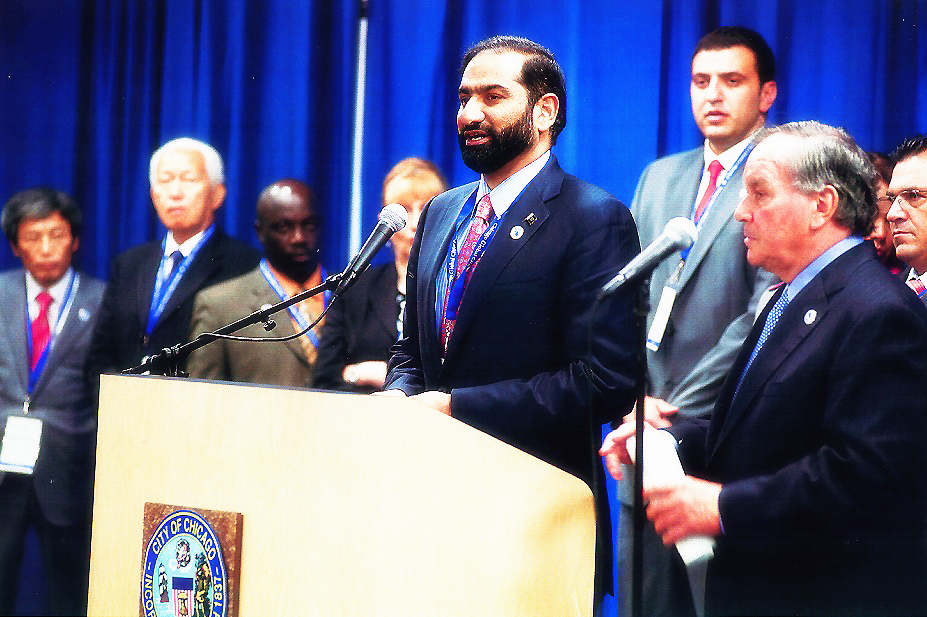
- Born: 25 July 1960 (age 65); Lahore, Punjab, Pakistan
- Education: Master of Business Administration degree from the Capital University of Science & Technology
- Occupations: Politician; Businessperson
- Known for: Punjab Group of Colleges
- Awards: Hilal-i-Imtiaz (Crescent of Excellence) Award by the President of Pakistan (2012)

Mian Amer Mahmood, HI (born 25 July 1960) is a Pakistani businessman and politician who is the founder of the Punjab Group of Colleges.

He was the mayor of Lahore between 2001 and 2009.

== Early life and education ==
Mahmood was born into an Arain family. He completed Master of Business Administration degree from the Punjab University.

== Business career ==
Mahmood launched the Punjab Group of Colleges in 1985. Later, he established Punjab Law College in 1987 and Punjab College of Business Administration in 1989. In 1993, he established Punjab Institute of Computer Science, followed by Muhammad Ali Jinnah University in 1998. In 2002, 2003 and 2010, he launched the University of Central Punjab, Resource Academia School System and Allied Schools respectively.

In December 2008, Amer Mahmood launched a new television network Dunya News. He also launched a daily Urdu language newspaper Roznama Dunya, which publishes from eight cities in Pakistan.

In 2016, Mian Amer Mahmood was elected as Chairman, Pakistan Broadcasters Association.

== Political career ==
Mahmood was first elected as a Lahore City c re-elected in 1991 and won the local bodies elections in Lahore. Later in 2001, he was elected Mayor of Lahore after winning the majority vote. He was re-elected for a subsequent term of four years, which he completed in 2009.

During his mayorship, he signed agreements of 'city sisterhood' with four cities that include Isfahan in 2004 and Mashhad in 2007, both cities of Iran. In 2005, Amer Mahmood stated that he was making efforts to declare Glasgow as a twin city of Lahore. Later on 6 May 2006, the mayor reported that Glasgow City Council would announce Lahore as sister city soon. Then on 14 September 2006, he signed the twin city memorandum with Glasgow's Lord Provost Liz Cameron in Glasgow.

Later in February 2007, Mayor of Lahore Mian Amer Mahmood also signed the sister cities memorandum with Chicago city's mayor Richard M. Daley and declared both as twin cities. During the tenure of Mian Amer Mahmood, Glasgow city provided Lahore with training facilities and fire fighting vehicles in 2008.

== Awards and recognition ==
Year	Award	Presented by	Ref.
2012	Hilal-i-Imtiaz (Crescent of Excellence) Award	President of Pakistan	
