= Daily Dunya =

Pakistani newspaper

Daily Dunya روزنامہ دُنیا
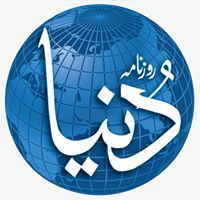
- Type: Daily Newspaper
- Format: Broadsheet
- Owner: Mian Amer Mahmood
- Editor-in-chief: Kamran Khan
- Founded: 2012
- Political alignment: Centre-right
- Language: Urdu
- Headquarters: Lahore, Pakistan
- Website: www.dunya.com.pk

Daily Dunya (Urdu: روزنامہ دُنیا) is an Urdu daily newspaper from Pakistan. It was launched on 3 September 2012 by National Communication Services from Lahore, Pakistan.

It is published simultaneously from Karachi, Lahore, Faisalabad, Gujranwala, Multan, Quetta and Sargodha. One 'Urdu Newspapers Online' website calls this newspaper a 'Popular Urdu daily newspaper from Pakistan'.

It is owned by Mian Amer Mahmood who is also the owner of Dunya News and Lahore News HD TV channels.
