= Capital University of Science & Technology =

University in Islamabad, Pakistan

- جامعہ دارالحکومت سائنس و ٹیکنالوجی
- Other name: CUST
- Former name: Muhammad Ali Jinnah University Islamabad Campus
- Motto: In pursuit of Excellence
- Type: Private
- Established: 1998
- Founder: Mian Amer Mahmood
- Academic affiliations: Higher Education Commission (Pakistan); Pakistan Engineering Council; Washington Accord
- Chancellor: Mian Amer Mahmood
- Vice-Chancellor: M. Mansoor Ahmed
- Students: 4000+
- Location: Islamabad, Pakistan; 33.6461°N 73.1467°E
- Campus: Urban
- Colours: Blue, white, red
- Website: cust.edu.pk

Capital University of Science & Technology abbreviated as (CUST) (Urdu: جامعہ دارالحکومت سائنس و ٹیکنالوجی) is a federally chartered, private university located in Islamabad, Pakistan and offers various undergraduate, post-graduate and doctorate levels programs with a strong emphasis on business management, applied sciences, engineering, medicine, natural sciences, arts, humanities and computer science.

== History ==
Initially, it was established in 1998, as the Islamabad Campus of Muhammad Ali Jinnah University, Karachi. On 28 September 2015, the president of Pakistan assented to the Capital University of Science and Technology (CUST) Act, passed by the Parliament of Pakistan, formally converting MAJU Islamabad campus into CUST.

== Affiliations ==
The Capital University of Science and Technology (CUST) is a part of the Punjab Group of Colleges (PGC), which is the largest private educational network of Pakistan. PGC operates four chartered universities across Pakistan, including CUST.

The CUST university emphasizes academic rigor, research, and global professional standards.

== Academics ==
=== Faculties ===
CUST currently offers academic programs through six major faculties:

- Faculty of Engineering
- Faculty of Computing
- Faculty of Management and Social Sciences
- Faculty of Health and Life Sciences
- Faculty of Pharmacy
- Faculty of Associate Degree Programs

The university offers 49 degree programs at the undergraduate, graduate, and doctoral levels across these faculties.

=== Undergraduate Programs ===
- BBA
- BS Aviation Management
- BS Accounting and Finance
- BS Business Analytics
- BS Psychology
- Pharm.D.
- BS English (Language & Literature)
- BS Biochemistry
- BS Biotechnology
- BS Medical Lab Technology
- BS Computer Science
- BS Software Engineering
- BS Mathematics with Data Science
- BS Artificial Intelligence
- BS Cyber Security
- BS Robotics and Intelligent Systems
- BS Electrical Engineering
- BS Computer Engineering
- BS Mechanical Engineering
- BS Civil Engineering

=== Associate Degree Programs ===
- ADP Computer Science
- ADP Business Administration
- ADP Commerce
- ADP Accounting and Finance

=== MS/MPhil programs ===
- MBA
- MS Management Science
- MS Psychology
- MS Project Management
- MS Accounting and Finance
- MS English Linguistics
- MS Electrical Engineering
- MS Computer Engineering
- MS Mechanical Engineering
- MS Engineering Management
- MS Computer Science
- MS Artificial Intelligence
- MS Civil Engineering
- MS Biosciences
- MPhil Pharmacy
- MPhil Mathematics

=== PhD programs ===
- PhD Civil Engineering
- PhD Biosciences
- PhD Management Sciences
- PhD Engineering Management
- PhD Electrical Engineering
- PhD Computer Engineering
- PhD Mechanical Engineering
- PhD Computer Science
- PhD Mathematics

=== Accreditation ===
All degree programs at CUST are recognized by the Higher Education Commission (HEC).

The BS programs in Electrical, Mechanical, and Civil Engineering are accredited by the Pakistan Engineering Council at Level II, aligned with the Washington Accord standards.

The computing programs, including Computer Science, Software Engineering, Artificial Intelligence, and Cyber Security, are accredited by the National Computing Education Accreditation Council (NCEAC).

The BBA program is accredited by the National Business Education Accreditation Council (NBEAC).

=== Research ===
Research is a crucial part of CUST's vision and mission. CUST has many research groups working in each of its departments doing extensive research on industrial problems. Just in 2022, Higher Education Commission of Pakistan (HEC) accepted seven proposals of research by CUST under National Research Program for Universities. CUST also has an Office of Research, Innovation and Commercialization (ORIC) that is recognized by HEC and a research center known as Jinnah Business Research Center.

=== Journals ===
- Jinnah Business Review

=== Sport facilities ===
- Tennis court
- Cricket ground
- Football ground
- Hockey ground
- Snooker court
- Volleyball court
- Chess and Ludo area
- Table tennis court

=== Energy efficient campus ===
The university has a dedicated sustainability committee known as "Directorate of Sustainability and Environment". Campus is also fully self-sufficient

=== Parking ===
Cust has separate parking areas for bikes, buses and cars.

== Scholarships ==
CUST is working on the mission that education should not be denied to any meritorious candidate because of societal or economic constraints. It is worth mentioning that CUST distributes annually over 500 million under various scholarship schemes.

CUST also awards scholarships to its students in the form of tuition fee waivers/concessions. At the start of a degree program, scholarships are awarded based on the applicant’s earlier academic credentials, which may have a specific definition for a given degree program. The university is awarding scholarships to its students under various categories including:

- Undergraduate Merit Scholarships – Up to 100%
- PGC Scholarship
- Need based and other Scholarships
- MS/MPhil Programs Scholarships

The current details regarding scholarship policy are available at the official policy page.

== Foreign collaborations ==
International Universities: Capital University of Science and Technology (CUST) has collaborated with international universities. These include University of California, Berkeley, Graz University of Technology, Gheorghe Asachi Technical University of Iași, Università degli Studi di Brescia, University of Bremen, Ohio State University, Télécom Paris, University of Évora, University of Massachusetts, and University of Technology Malaysia. These collaborations focus on joint research, faculty and student exchange, participation in the Erasmus Programme, and organizing academic events.

Other entities: CUST has the following notable collaborations:

- Erasmus Programme: Partnered to support student and staff exchange, ensuring quality education and credit recognition.
- SAP: Partnered with SAP University Alliances to grant access to Academic Educational Material for teachers.

== International rankings ==
University rankings

Global – Overall
- THE World: 601-800 (2023)

Regional – Overall
- QS Asia: 160 (2023)

According to the 2023 Times Higher Education World University Ranking, the Capital University of Science & Technology is ranked between 601 and 800 internationally. In the 2023 QS Asian University Rankings, it holds the 160th position in the Southeastern Asia category. Additionally, it is among the top ten universities in Pakistan and ranks 326th among 922 global universities in the international sustainability ranking by UI GreenMetric.

== See also ==
- Punjab Group of Colleges
- Punjab College of Business Administration
- Punjab Law College
- Mohammad Ali Jinnah University, Karachi
- University of Central Punjab, Lahore
