= Pan Am Flight 1-10 =

1948 aviation accident

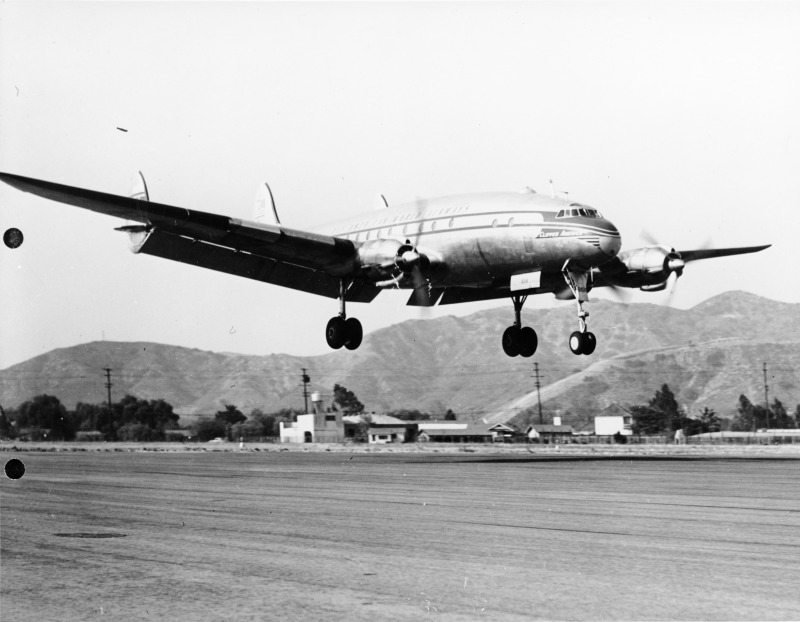
- NC88858, the aircraft involved in the accident

Accident
- Date: 15 April 1948
- Summary: Controlled flight into terrain due to mechanical and/or electrical failure
- Site: Shannon, Ireland; 52°42′57.86″N 8°53′55.3″W

Aircraft
- Aircraft type: Lockheed L-049-51-26 Constellation
- Aircraft name: Clipper Empress of the Skies
- Operator: Pan American World Airways
- Call sign: CLIPPER 1-10
- Registration: NC88858
- Flight origin: San Francisco
- 1st stopover: Calcutta
- 2nd stopover: Damascus
- 3rd stopover: Istanbul
- 4th stopover: Brussels
- 5th stopover: London
- Last stopover: Shannon Airport
- Destination: New York City
- Occupants: 31
- Passengers: 21
- Crew: 10
- Fatalities: 30
- Injuries: 1
- Survivors: 1

Pan Am Flight 1-10 was a Pan American passenger flight from London to Shannon Airport, part of a flight around the world from San Francisco, California, to New York City. On 15 April 1948, the Lockheed Constellation serving the flight crashed 725 meters (2,379 ft) short of Runway 23 at Shannon. Ten flight crew and 20 passengers died in the crash; 1 passenger survived with minor injuries.

== Description ==
"Pan Am Flight 1-10", flown with the Pan American Airways Lockheed Constellation, aircraft NC-88858 named "Clipper Empress of the Skies", departed from a London airport at 0:35 am.

At 1:59 am it reported to Shannon Airport that it was at the marker at Limerick Junction. The flight received clearance to land on runway 23 at 2:10 am but reported a missed approach ten minutes later. After getting a second clearance to land, it struck a stone fence 725 meters (2,379 ft) short of the runway, but perfectly aligned with it.

The initial crash ripped the plane apart. The undercarriage and the engines were torn off while the fuselage broke into three pieces. Fire destroyed the remains of the fuselage.

== Cause of the accident ==
The U.S. Civil Aeronautics Board investigated the crash and published its findings on 24 June 1948:

The Board determines that the probable cause of this accident was the continuation of an instrument approach to an altitude insufficient to clear the terrain. A contributing factor may have been the failure of the pilot's instrument fluorescent light.

The flight crew had earlier reported trouble with the pilot's instrument fluorescent light. At earlier stops in Brussels and London this light had failed too, but the maintenance crew in London could not repair it due to lack of spare parts.

Shannon Airport had earlier reported a fire in its ILS system, causing the system to fail. By the time the "Clipper Empress of the Skies" arrived, the system was again fully functional.

== Passenger list ==
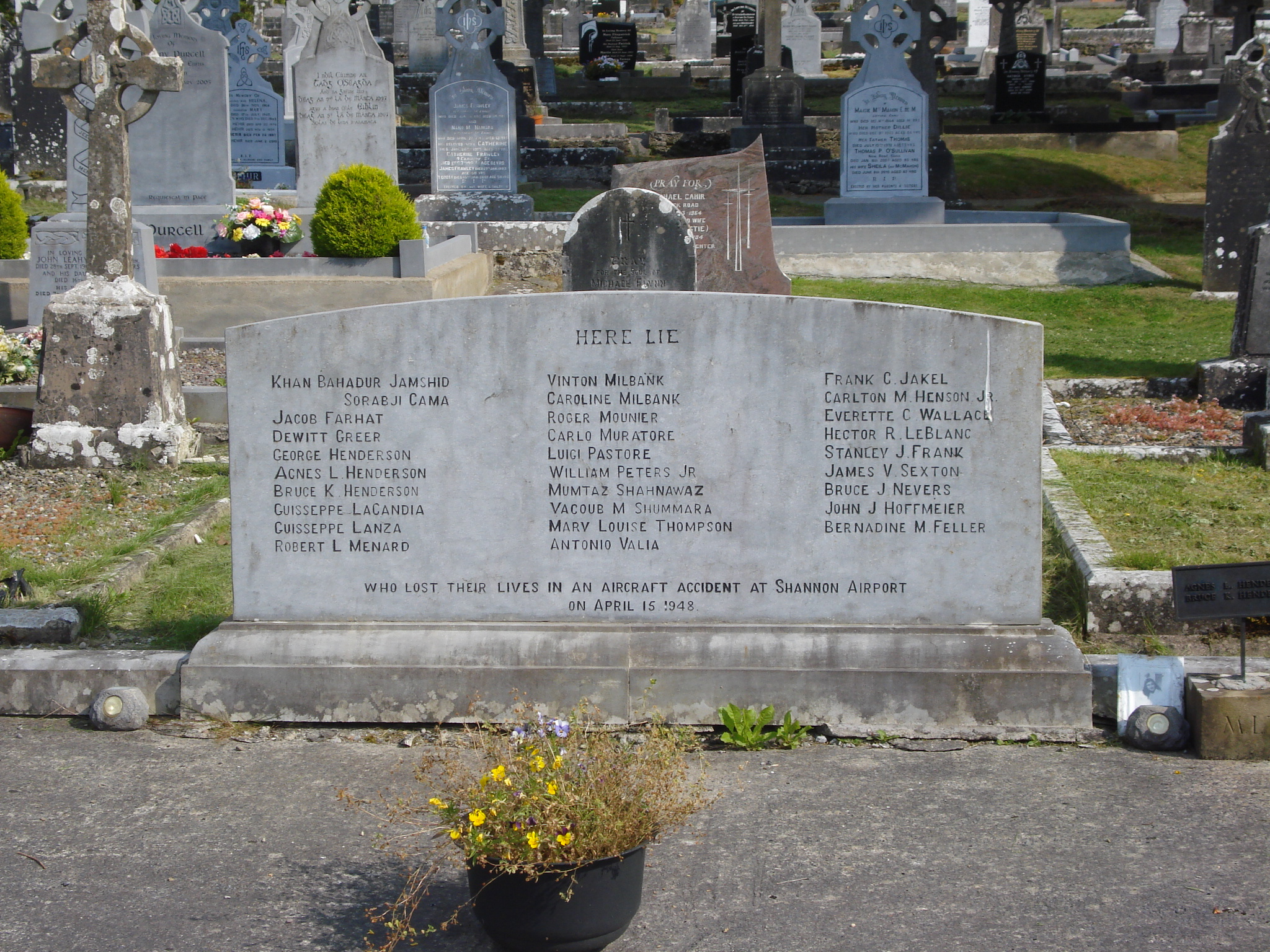
The victims of the disaster were interred in Drumcliff cemetery in Ennis, County Clare. They were buried in a communal plot with a memorial marker

The lone survivor was a Lockheed Aircraft Company employee, Mark Worst. He was Lockheed's former maintenance manager at Shannon and, when found, was taken to hospital suffering from extensive burns and abrasions. He believed his injuries happened when he was thrown through the floor of the belly baggage compartment which he thought had happened as the tail section fell off the plane. He had unfastened his safety belt when he realised the plane was going to crash, yet other passengers seemed quite calm. He later said that "I was a little dazed but I was able to get up and walk away" though worse off than he thought. The wife of the survivor had been waiting at the airport for him to arrive and saw a person staggering away from the burning wreckage. She accompanied Pan Am officials to the crash site to help, not knowing the person she saw was her husband and the only survivor.

Among those killed in the crash were Mumtaz Shahnawaz, a Pakistani diplomat and writer, and Homi Maneck Mehta, an Indian industrialist.
