= Mian Iftikharuddin =

Pakistani politician

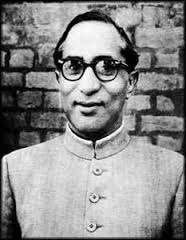
- Born: 8 April 1907; Lahore, Punjab, British India
- Died: 6 June 1962 (aged 55); Lahore, Punjab, Pakistan
- Education: Aitchison College; University of Oxford
- Occupation: Political activist
- Years active: 1930s–1962
- Known for: Founder and owner of The Pakistan Times newspaper, Urdu language newspaper Imroze and the magazine Lail-o-Nahar, all 3 from Lahore, Pakistan
- Movement: Set a new progressive trend in journalism in Pakistan in the 1940s

Mian Iftikharuddin (Punjabi, Urdu: میاں افتخارالدیں; 8 April 1907 – 6 June 1962) was a Pakistani politician, activist of the Indian National Congress, who later joined the All-India Muslim League and worked for the cause of Pakistan under the leadership of Muhammad Ali Jinnah. He was known for his left-wing politics and briefly served as the Provincial Minister for Rehabilitation of Refugees in Punjab.

== Early life and education ==
Mian Iftikharuddin was born on 8 April 1907 in British India (in modern-day Baghbanpura, Lahore, Punjab, Pakistan) to the wealthy Arain Mian family, the custodians of the Shalimar Gardens, Lahore. His relations included Sir Mian Muhammad Shafi and Sir Mian Abdul Rashid. Mian Iftikharuddin was educated at Aitchison College and the University of Oxford.

== Political career ==
=== Indian National Congress ===
Mian Iftikharuddin joined the Congress Party in 1936. He was elected to the Punjab Provincial Assembly in 1937 and became the President of the Punjab Provincial Congress in 1940, serving in that position until 1945. He was a member of the All India Congress Committee from the 1930s to the mid-1940s. Iftikharuddin was very close to Jawaharlal Nehru. In 1937, he was instrumental in introducing the Kashmir leader Sheikh Abdullah to Nehru.

Iftikharuddin opposed the Muslim League's Lahore Resolution and declared that "any attempt at disrupting the unity of [India's] spirit is a betrayal of the history of a thousand years.” However, by 1942, he was supporting C. Rajagopalachari's formula for granting the Pakistan demand, which was rejected by Congress Working Committee. In 1945, Iftikharuddin resigned from the Congress Party and joined the Muslim League. According to scholar Asdar Ali, he was persuaded to join the Muslim League by his colleagues in the Communist Party of India, which had by then decided to work for "Muslim self-determination".

=== Muslim League ===
Iftikharuddin joined the All India Muslim League in September 1945. His palatial ancestral home in Baghbanpura was used for training Muslim League National Guards. He was elected to the Punjab Provincial Assembly in 1946 as a Muslim League member, and led the civil disobedience movement against the Unionist government of Khizar Hayat Tiwana.

After the 3 June plan for partition of India was announced, Jinnah looked increasingly towards young men like Iftikharuddin to help Pakistan stand on its own feet. Iftikharuddin was elected the first president of the Punjab Provincial Muslim League after the Independence of Pakistan in 1947. He was also appointed the Minister for rehabilitation of refugees in the Government of Punjab.

=== Pakistan Times ===
Iftikharuddin was the founder-owner of The Pakistan Times, a newspaper started by the leftists in the Muslim League to create a balance to the centrist Muslim League mouthpiece Dawn newspaper as well as the Hindu press in pre-1947 British India.

=== Kashmir conflict ===
In 1947, Iftikharuddin played a key role in the development of the Kashmir conflict. The Muslim Conference leader Sardar Ibrahim narrated that he went to Lahore on 28 August 1947 seeking Pakistan's help for the rebellion in Poonch. After a week's efforts, Ibrahim finally met Iftikharuddin, who lent a sympathetic ear. Then Iftikharuddin went to Srinagar to make his own enquiries. Sardar Ibrahim says that he came back convinced on all the points made by him.

According to General Akbar Khan's narrative, Iftikharuddin was asked to go to Srinagar to assess Pakistan's prospects in acquiring Kashmir's accession. On his way, he met General Akbar Khan vacationing in Murree and asked him to prepare a plan to help Kashmiri Muslims take action against possible accession of Kashmir to India. He then spent a week in Srinagar, and came back convinced that the Maharaja was intending to accede to India and Pakistan needed to help the Muslims of Kashmir to fight for freedom.

Meanwhile, Akbar Khan created a plan titled "Armed Revolt inside Kashmir", which was then passed on to the Prime Minister Liaquat Ali Khan and other senior officials. A meeting was called under the leadership of the Prime Minister on 12 September 1947, where this plan as well as another plan prepared by Sardar Shaukat Hayat Khan for organising a tribal invasion of Kashmir were discussed and approved.

After Sheikh Abdullah was released from prison, at the beginning of October 1947, Iftikharuddin went to Srinagar again in order to persuade Abdullah regarding accession to Pakistan. Abdullah agreed to meet Pakistani leaders and accompanied him to Lahore. However, the Governor General Muhammad Ali Jinnah refused to meet Abdullah and the mission failed. Iftikharuddin was dejected and concluded, 'Kashmir is lost to us'.

Soon afterwards the tribal invasion was launched and Iftikharuddin played no more role in the Kashmir conflict.

=== Government of West Punjab ===
Iftikharuddin briefly served as Minister for Rehabilitation of Refugees in the provincial government of Punjab in 1947. In 1949, as a minister, he proposed radical land reforms in the Punjab, however this led to a backlash from the land-owning feudal leadership of the Pakistan Muslim League under the leadership of Nawab Iftikhar Hussain Khan Mamdot, a big landowner himself. In frustration, Iftikharuddin resigned from his Ministry in 1949 and was formally expelled from the Muslim League in 1951.

Iftikharuddin was the only Muslim member in the parliament house who opposed the 'objectives resolution' as he felt that the resolution was vague. He further suggested that such a resolution should be the decision of the 70 million people of Pakistan. This resolution was also disapproved by minorities’ leaders Prem Hari, Chandra Mandal and Kumar Dutta. However, he chose to vote in favour of the resolution, because he was assured that minorities will have all the rights and privileges in an Islamic state.

=== Political activism ===
Later he jumped off the Muslim League ship, and formed his own ‘Azad Pakistan Party’ committed to liberal secularism in the country. Though big names like Dr. Khan Sahib and the Khudai Khidmatgars were attracted to it, Azad Pakistan Party soon faded away in history. He was also considered a leading light of the National Awami Party as well.

His Pakistan Times newspaper continued to promote social justice and agrarian reforms in Pakistan, it attracted many well known leftists including its first editor Faiz Ahmad Faiz. However, in 1959, following the military takeover by Ayub Khan, the newspaper was taken over by the government and despite a legal challenge, he failed to obtain either compensation or the return of ownership of his newspaper. Since he was an advocate of an independent foreign policy, free from demented generals and Pakistan's exit from The Southeast Asia Treaty Organisation (SEATO), the Baghdad Pact also called CENTO and other defense treaties, it was expected from his opponents to label him as 'a stranger in the house'.

== Life ==
Mian Iftikharuddin was married to Begum Ismat Iftikharuddin. According to Azad Kashmir civil servant and writer Abdul Haq Suharwardy, Begum Ismat and General Akbar Khan's wife, Nasim Shahnawaz (later Nasim Jahan), were cousins. The couple lived in a mansion at 21 Aikman Road, which they bought from the Raja of Mandi. They had three children: Sohail Iftikhar, Arif Iftikhar and Seema Iftikhar.

Iftikharuddin died at the age of 54, after suffering a heart attack on 6 June 1962. Pakistan's famous poet Faiz Ahmed Faiz, Iftikharuddin's friend and ally, paid a tribute to him through his poetry:

"Jo rukey tu koh-e-garan thay hum, jo chalay tu jaan say guzar gaye,

Raah-e-yaar hum ne qadam qadam, tujhay yaadgaar banaa diya."

Translation:

"I was a mountain when I stopped

And when I moved I sacrificed my being

O path to my beloved, I have, step by step

Turned you into a memorial"

== See also ==
- List of Pakistani journalists

== Bibliography ==
- Asdar Ali, Kamran (2013). "Progressives, Punjab and Pakistan: the early years". South Asian History and Culture. 4 (4): 483–502. doi:10.1080/19472498.2013.824679. ISSN 1947-2498. S2CID 144915436.
- Kamran Asdar Ali (2015). Surkh Salam: Communist Politics and Class Activism in Pakistan, 1947–1972. I.B.Tauris. ISBN 978-0-19-940308-0.
- Ibrahim Khan, Muhammad (1990), The Kashmir Saga, Verinag
- Jalal, Ayesha (2002), Self and Sovereignty: Individual and Community in South Asian Islam Since 1850, Routledge, ISBN 978-1-134-59937-0
- Raza, Ali (2017), "The Illusory Promise of Freedom: Mian Iftikhar-ud-Din and the Movement for Pakistan", in Ali Usman Qasmi; Megan Eaton Robb (eds.), Muslims against the Muslim League, Cambridge University Press, pp. 82–108, ISBN 978-1-107-16663-9
- Sobhan, Rehman (2015), Untranquil Recollections: The Years of Fulfilment, SAGE Publications, ISBN 978-93-5150-320-0
- Taseer, Christobel Bilqees (1986), The Kashmir of Sheikh Muhammad Abdullah, Ferozsons
