= Faiza Ahmad Malik =

Pakistani politician

Member of the Provincial Assembly of the Punjab
- In office 2002 – 31 May 2018
- Constituency: Reserved seat for women

Personal details
- Born: 15 May 1970 (age 55) Lahore
- Party: Pakistan Peoples Party

Faiza Ahmad Malik (Urdu: فائزہ احمد ملک; born 15 May 1970) is a Pakistani politician who was a Member of the Provincial Assembly of the Punjab, from 2002 to May 2018.

== Early life and education ==
She was born on 15 May 1970 in Lahore.

She earned a Bachelor of Arts in 1989 from Queen Mary College, Lahore.

== Political career ==
She was elected to the Provincial Assembly of the Punjab as a candidate of Pakistan Peoples Party (PPP) on a reserved seat for women in the 2002 Pakistani general election.

She was re-elected to the Provincial Assembly of the Punjab as a candidate of PPP on a reserved seat for women in the 2008 Pakistani general election.

She was re-elected to the Provincial Assembly of the Punjab as a candidate of PPP on a reserved seat for women in the 2013 Pakistani general election.
