= Mayor of Lahore =

Head of local government of Lahore, Pakistan

- ناظم لاہور
- Incumbent; Vacant since December 31, 2021
- Member of: City Council
- Reports to: City Council
- Seat: Lahore Town Hall (Lahore, Punjab, Pakistan)
- Appointer: Direct election by residents of Lahore
- Term length: 4 years
- Inaugural holder: Mian Amiruddin
- Formation: 1931
- Deputy: 9 Zonal Mayors
- Website: Official website

The Mayor of Lahore (Urdu: ناظم لاہور) is the leader of the municipal government of Lahore (Metropolitan Corporation Lahore) in Lahore, Punjab, Pakistan. The mayor is directly-elected in municipal elections every four years alongside 9 deputy town mayors. The mayor is responsible for the administration of government services, the composition of councils and committees overseeing Lahore District departments and serves as the chairperson for meeting of Lahore Council.

== Responsibilities ==
According to the Functions of Municipal Corporation under Punjab Local Government Act 2013 the Mayor shall:

- Provide vision for long term development, leadership and direction for efficient functioning of the Metropolitan Corporation in consultation and coordination with Cantonment Board, housing authorities and federal agencies.
- Identify the needs of the urban area and evaluate and priorities them in the light of integrated development plans and the estimates of revenue and expenditure, in addition to any applicable national and provincial policies, programs and projects.
- Recommend to the Metropolitan Corporation strategies, programs and services to address prioritized needs.
- Recommend or determine the best way to implement those strategies, programs and services through partnerships, delegations, contracts and other means for the maximum benefit of the community.
- Maintain administrative and financial discipline of the local government.
- Present tax proposals to the local government.
- Issue executive orders to the municipal offices for discharge of the functions of the local government.
- Represent the local government on public and ceremonial occasions.
- Present proposal to the local government for approval of budget.
- Conduct inspections of municipal offices functioning under the local government.

The Mayor shall, in the performance of duties:

- Identify and develop criteria in terms of which progress in the implementation of the strategies, programs and services can be evaluated, including key performance indicators.
- Evaluate progress against the key performance indicators.
- Review the performance of the local government in order to improve:
  - Economy, efficiency and effectiveness.
  - Efficiency of revenue collection services.
  - Implementation of the bye-laws.
- Oversee formulation and execution of the annual development plans, delivery of services and functioning of the local government.
- Present report on the performance of the local government to the house of the local government at least twice a year.
- Perform such other duties and exercise such powers as may be prescribed or as the local government may delegate.

== Mayors of Lahore ==
Mayor	Start	End	Deputies	Affiliation	Notes
Mian Aminuddin	1953	1961		PML	First lord mayor of Lahore in newly formed Pakistan
Mian Mehmood Said	1964	1971		PML	
Mian Shuja-ur-Rahman	1979	1983		PML	Local bodies system introduced by President Muhammad Zia-ul-Haq
Mian Shuja-ur-Rahman	1983	1987		PML	
Mian Muhammad Azhar	1987	1990	Ejaz Chaudhary	PML	
Khawaja Riaz Mahmood	1992	1993		PMLN	
Khawaja Ahmad Hassan	1998	1999		PMLN	
Mian Amir Mehmood	2001	2005		PMLQ	City District Government introduced by President Pervez Musharraf
Mian Amir Mehmood	2005	2009		PMLQ	City District Government Lahore
Administrator system implemented 2010–2016
Mubashar Javed	2016	2021	Mushtaq Mughal, Waseem Qadir, Nazir Swati, Mehr Mehmood Ahmed, Ejaz Hafeez, Mian Tariq, Muhammad Bilal, Haji Allah Rakha and Rao Shahabuddin	PMLN	Punjab Local Government Act 2013
Administrator system implemented January 2022 – present

== Elections ==
=== 2015 ===
1. PML (N) 84.5 (83.5%)
2. Independents 9.9 (9.78%)
3. PTI 4.4 (4.35%)
4. PPP 2.4 (2.37%)

Following are the polling results of Union Councils of Lahore.

MCL/Zones Parties	MCL
Pakistan Muslim League (N)	229
Independents	27
Pakistan Tehreek-e-Insaf	12
Pakistan Peoples Party	5
Awaiting results	5*
Total	274

*Results of 5 Union Councils awaited.

== Metropolitan Corporation Lahore ==
Lahore Local Government System consists of Metropolitan Corporation Lahore (MCL). will be divided into 9 zones and each zone will be headed by a Deputy Mayor under the new Local Government system. consolidated urban areas falling under the administrative control of Lahore District will have Municipal Corporations and Municipal committees. The Metropolitan Corporation Lahore (MCL) will elect a mayor and 9 deputy mayors in the 9 zones of Lahore while Lahore district areas will have Municipal Corporations rather than the union councils/district councils. Following are the number of seats for Lahore District

General	Women	Worker	Technocrat	Youth	Non-Muslims	Total
274	25	5	3	2	10	318

== See also ==
- Government of Punjab
- Lahore
