= Ramay =

Clan name and a surname in Punjab, Pakistan

Regions with significant populations
- Pakistan

Languages
- Punjabi; Urdu; Saraiki; Sindhi

Religion
- Islam

Related ethnic groups
- Arain; Arain of Delhi

Ramay (Urdu: رامے) is a surname mainly in Punjab, Pakistan. They are a subcaste branching from the Arain caste.

The name Ramay means Archer. They live in large numbers in the Punjab province of Pakistan. Ramay is a gotra of Arain caste in Pakistan.

== Notable people ==
- Muhammad Hanif Ramay (1930 – 1 January 2006), former governor and chief minister of Punjab province.
