= Mian Deh, Badakhshan =

Mian Deh Mīān Deh
- Location in Afghanistan
- Coordinates: 35°51′14″N 70°51′24″E
- Country: Afghanistan
- Province: Badakhshan Province
- Time zone: + 4.30

Mian Deh is a village in Badakhshan Province in north-eastern Afghanistan.

== See also ==
- Badakhshan Province
