= University of Central Punjab =

Private university in Lahore, Punjab, Pakistan

Coordinates: 31.4469°N 74.2682°E

- جامع پنجاب مرکزی
- Other name: UCP
- Motto: The centre of your future
- Type: Private
- Established: 2002
- Accreditation: Higher Education Commission (Pakistan)
- Affiliations: Washington Accord
- Academic affiliations: Pakistan Engineering Council; Pharmacy Council of Pakistan; Pakistan Bar Council
- Chairman: Mian Amer Mahmood
- Pro-Rector: Dr. Hammad Naveed
- Faculty: 602
- Students: 16,000+
- Undergraduates: 14,400+
- Postgraduates: 1,600+
- Location: 1, Khayaban-e-Jinnah Road, Johar Town Lahore, Punjab 2, D-464 6th Road, Satellite Town, Rawalpindi Punjab, Pakistan
- Campus: Urban
- Mascot: UCPian
- Website: ucp.edu.pk

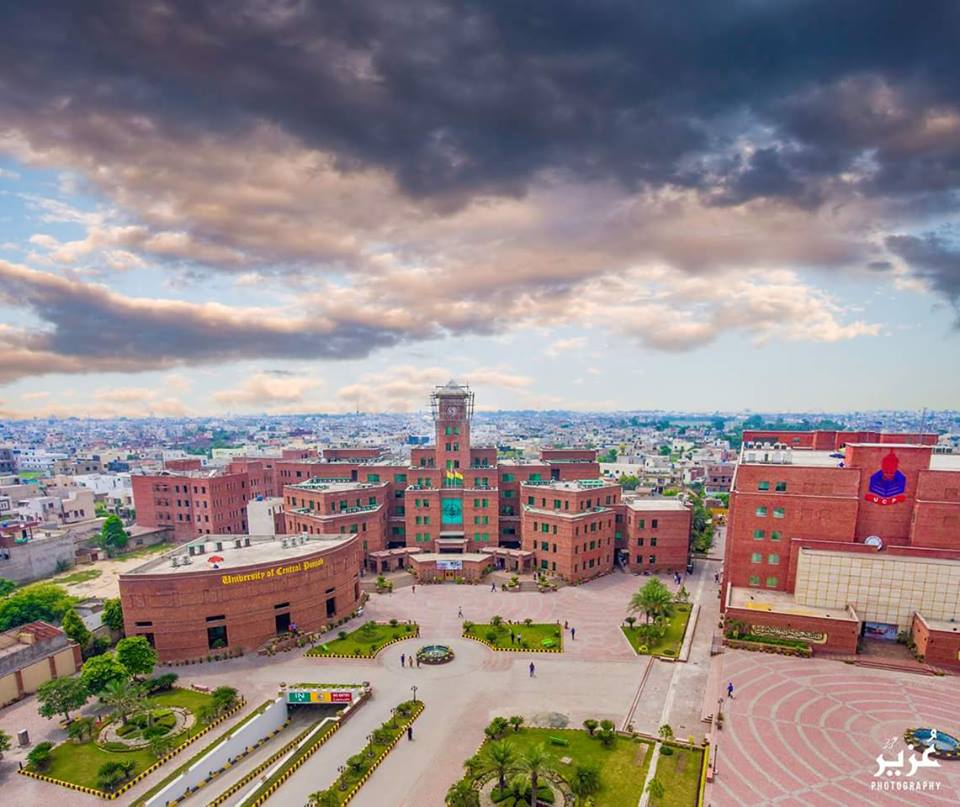
An Aerial View of UCP

The University of Central Punjab or UCP is a private university located on Khayaban-e-Jinnah Road, Lahore, Punjab, Pakistan.

== History ==
On 15 August 1996, the Punjab Group of Colleges, a private business venture, petitioned the Government of Punjab for the establishment of a university in the province. UCP was chartered by the Government of the Punjab in 2002 and recognized by the Higher Education Commission (Pakistan). Punjab Institute of Computer Science (PICS), Punjab College of Commerce (PCC) and Punjab College of Information Technology (PCIT) formed the core of the university at the time of establishment.

Following a restructuring in 2004, the PCBA and PICS operate under the Faculty of Management Studies and Faculty of Information Technology of the University of Central Punjab respectively. The Punjab Colleges of Commerce and the Punjab Law College respectively function under the Faculties of Commerce and of Law of the University of Central Punjab. The Faculty of Engineering (FOE) was introduced in 2002.

The university is located opposite Shaukat Khanum Memorial Cancer Hospital & Research Centre on Khayaban-e-Jinnah Road Lahore. It covers an area of 500,000 square feet. The campus was built in 2010 and consists of five blocks. There is an auditorium block consisting of 300 seats. It houses a number of facilities, both curricular and co-curricular in nature.

=== Library ===
The library of the university has an academic collection of more than 40,000 books from various disciplines being taught at the university. The collection in the library is arranged according to a specific classification scheme known as Dewey Decimal Classification (DDC) scheme.

== Organization and administration ==
The governor of Punjab serves as the Patron of the university. Educational Excellence Limited is the sponsoring body of the university whose chairman, currently Mian Amer Mahmood, also chairs the Board of Governors. The board includes the chairman, Pro-rector and members nominated by the Patron, Chairman, HEC, PHEC and accrediting bodies.

== Academics ==
Faculties

The university consists of the following faculties:

- Faculty of Engineering
- Faculty of Humanities and Social Sciences
- Faculty of Pharmaceutical Sciences
- Faculty of Law
- School of Media and Communication Studies
- Faculty of Life Sciences
- Faculty of Information Technology and Computer Science
- Faculty of Language & Literature
- Faculty of Science & Technology
- Faculty of Management Sciences

Accreditation

All of the engineering programs offered by UCP are accredited by the Pakistan Engineering Council under Level-II, substantially equivalent to Washington Accord. Whereas, the Pharm-D program is accredited by the Pharmacy Council of Pakistan and Computer Science program by NCEAC.

Rankings

University rankings

Global – Overall
- THE World: 801-1000 (2025)

Regional – Overall
- QS Asia: =362 (2025)

UCP was ranked #=94 in QS Asian University Rankings - Southern Asia for 2025. It was also ranked #1201+ in QS Sustainability Ranking for 2025. According to the HEC ranking 2022, its business school was ranked seventh in Lahore.

== Notable alumni ==
- Atif Aslam (Singer)

== See also ==
- Muhammad Ali Jinnah University, Karachi
- Central University of Punjab
- Capital University of Science & Technology, Islamabad
