= Jahanara Shahnawaz =

Pakistani politician and women's activist

Member of the Constituent Assembly of Pakistan
- In office 10 August 1947 – 24 October 1954
- Constituency: Lahore District

Personal details
- Born: 7 April 1896 Lahore, Punjab, British India
- Died: 27 November 1979 (aged 83) Pakistan
- Spouse: Mian Shah Nawaz
- Children: Mumtaz Shahnawaz; Nasim Jahan
- Parent: Sir Muhammad Shafi (father)
- Occupation: Politician
- Known for: Pakistan Movement

Begum Jahanara Shahnawaz, also known as Jehan Ara Shah Nawaz (7 April 1896 – 27 November 1979), was a prominent activist and politician in Punjab, active before and after the independence of Pakistan.

== Family background and education ==
Jahanara Shahnawaz belonged to the prominent Arain Mian family of Baghbanpura in Lahore. Her father Sir Muhammad Shafi was a prominent lawyer and politician.

She was educated at Queen Mary College, Lahore. A dedicated member of the All India Muslim League, she was also a leading advocate for women's rights. She was the daughter of Sir Muhammad Shafi and the wife of Mian Muhammad Shahnawaz whom she married in 1911.

== Political career ==
In 1918, Jahanara Shahnawaz successfully moved the All India Muslim Women's Conference to pass a resolution against polygamy. In 1935, she founded the Punjab Provincial Women's Muslim League. In the Round Table Conference of 1930, she and Radhabai Subbarayan were the only two active members of women's organisations nominated to the conference; they argued unsuccessfully for a 5 per cent reservation for women in the legislatures.

In 1937, she was elected to the Punjab Legislative Assembly and was appointed Parliamentary Secretary for Education, Medical Relief and Public Health. In 1938 she became a member of the Women's Central Subcommittee of the All India Muslim League. In 1942 India's government appointed her as a member of the National Defense Council, but the Muslim League asked League members to resign from the Defense Council. She refused and was thus removed from the Muslim League. However, she rejoined the League in 1946, and in that same year was elected to the Central Constituent Assembly. That year she also went along with M. A. Ispahani on a goodwill mission to America, to explain the point of view of the Muslim League. She was arrested along with other Muslim League leaders during the Civil disobedience movement in Punjab in 1947.

In 1948, she led a protest of thousands of women in the streets of Lahore, protesting against the fact that a bill encouraging better economic opportunities for women had been removed from the agenda. Prime minister Liaquat Ali Khan intervened, and the Muslim Personal Law of Shariat of 1948 was passed; it legally recognized a woman's right to inherit property, including agricultural land, which had not been recognized during the British Raj.

She was president of the provincial branch of the All India Muslim Women's Conference for seven years, and also served as vice-president of the Central Committee of the All India Muslim Women's Conference.

She was the first woman in Asia to preside over a legislative session. She was also associated with the education and orphanage committees of the Anjuman-i-Himayat-i-Islam, in Lahore, and with several hospitals, as well as maternity and child welfare committees. She was a member of the All Indian General Committee of the Red Cross Society.

== Books ==
Jahanara Shahnawaz wrote a novel titled Husn Ara Begum and her memoirs titled Father and Daughter: a political autobiography. She also wrote for women's and literary magazines.

== Death and legacy ==
Jahanara Shahnawaz died on 27 November 1979 at age 83. She had three children: Ahmad Shahnawaz Sr., a chemical engineer and the first Indian to attend Massachusetts Institute of Technology (MIT), Nasim Shahnawaz (Nasim Jahan), who married General Akbar Khan and later became a politician of the Pakistan Peoples Party, and Mumtaz Shahnawaz, who died in a plane crash in 1948 while on her way to the United Nations General Assembly to represent Pakistan there.

Jahanara Shahnawaz worked for the economic independence of Pakistan. She was of the view that the foreign policy of Pakistan should be based on trade among nations and not aid.

== See also ==
- Mian Family Baghbanpura
- Arain
