= Baghbanpura =

Human settlement in Pakistan

Baghbanpura (Urdu: باغبان پورہ) is a town and Union Council of Shalimar Tehsil, Lahore District, Punjab, Pakistan. It is located along the Grand Trunk Road some 5 kilometres northeast of the main Lahore city.

The site for Baghbanpura was granted by Mughal Emperor Shah Jahan to Mian Muhammad Yousaf s/o Mian Muhammad Ishaq in lieu of giving his private land in the village Ishaq Pur as a gift to emperor for the construction of Shalimar Garden. Later Baghbanpura became the home town of the Arain Mian family, whom Shah Jahan also granted the custodianship of the Shalimar Gardens.

The word Baghbanpura literally means 'Town of Gardeners', as this place originally used to be surrounded by many gardens mostly owned by Arain Mian family itself. But by the passage of time all gardens and agricultural fields are now converted to developed city and only garden left there is the Shalimar Garden, now included as a UNESCO World Heritage Site. Ruins of Mughal style gates of some gardens are still present along G.T. Road. Baghbanpura has now become a part of modern Lahore city.

Mela Chiraghan or Mela Shalamar (Punjabi: میلہ چراغاں; "Festival of Lights") is a three-day annual festival to mark the urs (death anniversary) of the Punjabi Sufi poet and saint Shah Hussain. It takes place at the shrine of Shah Hussain in Baghbanpura.

== Constituency areas ==
National Assembly: NA-127(Lahore-II) provincial Assembly: PP-148 & PP-153
