= Mian Shah Din =

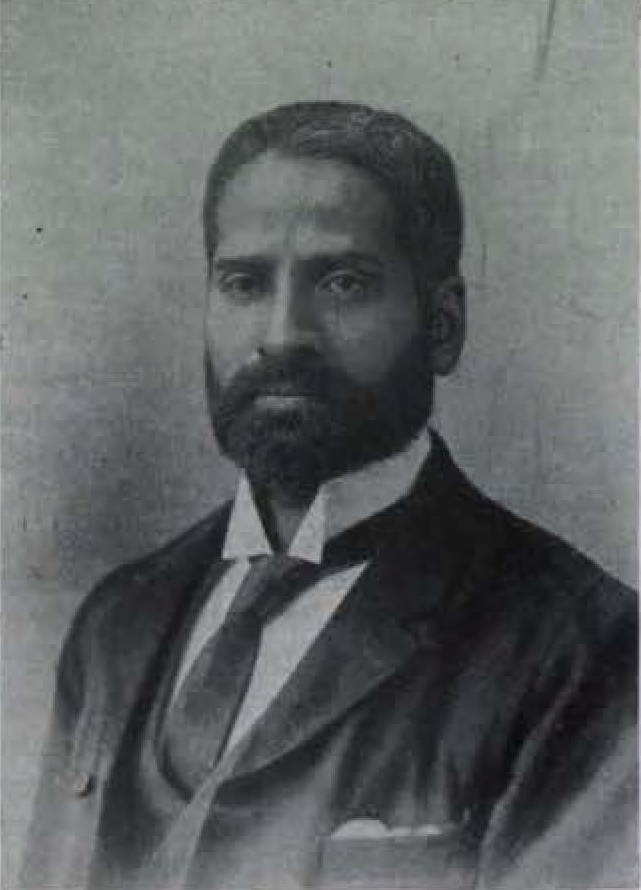
- c. 1907
- Born: 2 April 1868; Lahore, Punjab, British India
- Died: 2 July 1918 (aged 50); Lahore, Punjab, British India
- Education: Government College, Lahore; Middle Temple
- Occupations: Barrister and judge

Mian Shah Din (2 April 1868 - 2 July 1918) was a Punjabi lawyer and politician in British India. In October, 1908 he was the first Muslim appointed a judge of the Chief Court of the Punjab, now known as the Lahore High Court.

== Biography ==
=== Early life ===
Mian Shah Din was born in Lahore to the Arain Mian family of Baghbanpura, Lahore. He was educated at Government College, Lahore and in 1887 left for London to study law. He was called to the bar at Middle Temple in 1889. While in England, he joined judge Abdul Rahim and others in the foundation of the London branch of the Anjuman-i-Islamiya, which was established on 10 November 1889. This was the first Muslim organisation in the United Kingdom and Shah Din was elected its vice-president.

=== Career ===
He returned to Lahore in September 1890, and enrolled as an advocate at the Punjab Chief Court in January 1891. That same year he established the Young Men Mohammedan Association at Lahore. Two years later, he read out at the All India Muhammadan Educational Conference, a learned and thoughtful paper on “The Education of Musalmans in the Punjab”. This paper impressed Syed Ahmad Khan so much that Shah Din was chosen, at the early age of twenty-six, to preside over the next session of the All-India Mohammedan Educational Conference in 1894. The following year he was made a fellow of the University of the Punjab and in 1896, he began working as a Trustee of Aligarh College.

Mian Shah Din was one of the members of the Simla Deputation in 1906. After the All-India Muslim League was established, an active provincial branch was organised in the Punjab in November 1907 and Shah Din was elected its president.

In October 1908, he was appointed the first Muslim Judge of the Chief Court of the Punjab, and was at that particular time the only sitting Muslim judge in any of the High Courts across British India.

Under the Minto-Morley Reforms, he was appointed along with Mian Mohammad Shafi, Umar Hayat Tiwana and Chaudhary Shahab-ud-din to the Punjab Council. These western-educated leaders, drawn from the Muslim middle and upper classes, were marked by their progressive and liberal views. His appointment as a judge would however curtail his political ambitions and he resigned as president of the Punjabi branch of the All-India Muslim League. He nonetheless retained his passion for educational work and in 1913 presided over the All India Muhammadan Educational Conference for a second time.

=== Death ===
Mian Shah Din died in 1918 at the age of fifty, and was eulogised by Muhammad Iqbal.

== Humayun ==
His son also launched Humayun, a monthly magazine in which Iqbal wrote the poem, “Humayun”.
