= Mian Abdul Rashid =

Former Chief Justice of Pakistan

Sir Mian Abdul Rashid سر میاں عبد الرشيد KCSI, H.Pk
- Rashid (left) swearing-in Muhammad Ali Jinnah as Governor-General

1st Chief Justice of Pakistan
- In office 27 June 1949 – 29 June 1954
- Appointed by: Muhammad Ali Jinnah
- Preceded by: Position established
- Succeeded by: Muhammad Munir

Personal details
- Born: Abdul Rashid; 29 June 1889 Lahore, Punjab, British India (now Pakistan)
- Died: 6 November 1981 (aged 92) Islamabad, Pakistan
- Citizenship: British Indian (1889–1947); Pakistani (1947–1981)
- Education: FC College University (BA); Cambridge University (Law Tripos), (LLM); Inns of Court School of Law (Bar Exam)
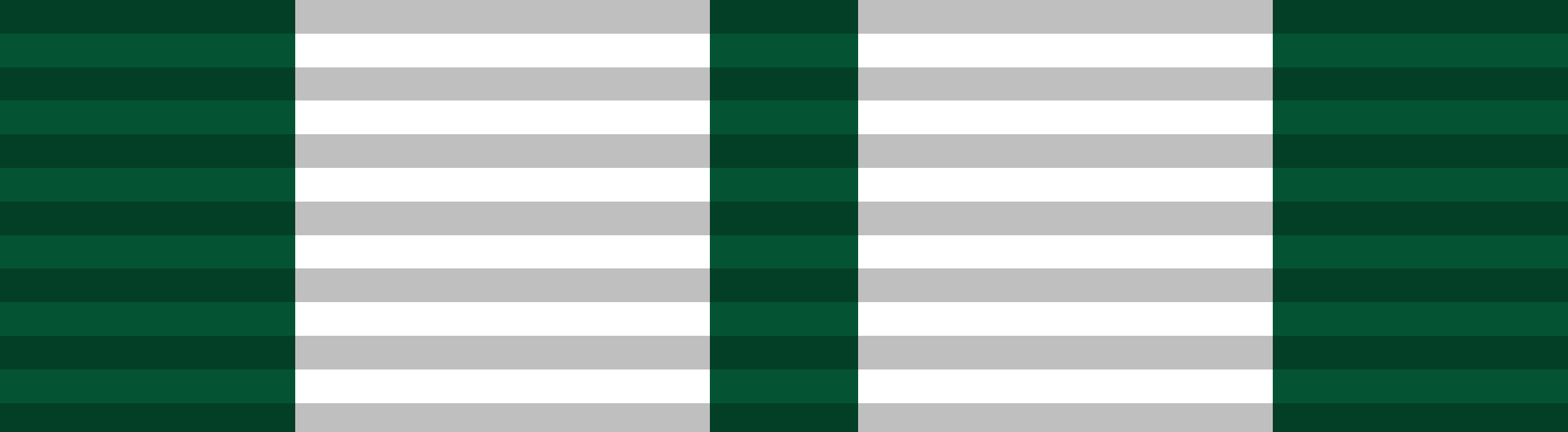
- Awards: Knight Bachelor Star of India Hilal-e-Pakistan

Supreme Court of Pakistan

Sir Mian Abdul Rashid, KCSI, H.Pk (Urdu: سر میاں عبد الرشيد; 29 June 1889 – 6 November 1981) was a jurist, legal philosopher, the first Chief Justice of Pakistan, and one of the founding fathers of Pakistan.

== Early life and education ==
He was born on 29 June 1889 in a well-known Arain family, namely Mian family of Baghbanpura of Lahore. He received his early education at Central Model School in Lahore, and got his B.A. from Forman Christian College, also in Lahore, and a Tripos and Masters from Christ's College, Cambridge University in 1912.

In 1913, he was called to the Bar from the Middle Temple, London.

== Law career ==
He started practising law at Multan and later shifted to Lahore in 1913 where he joined the chambers of Mian Muhammad Shafi. He was then appointed Assistant Legal Remembrancer. In the summer of 1923, he was appointed acting judge of Lahore High Court on recommendation of Sir Shadi Lal, who was then Chief Justice of the said court. From 1927 to 1931, he officiated as Government of Punjab's Advocate. He was appointed Judge, Lahore High Court in 1933. In 1946, he was made Chief Justice of Judicature at Lahore, and was knighted in the 1946 Birthday Honours list.

== First Chief Justice of Pakistan ==
On 15 August 1947, when Quaid-i-Azam Muhammad Ali Jinnah was sworn in as the first Governor-General of Pakistan, Rashid, as the most senior Muslim judge in British India, administered the oath of office to him.

== Awards and recognition ==
- In 2005, the Government of Pakistan honoured him by naming a main road (7th Avenue) after him in the federal capital, Islamabad. The former Seventh Avenue down to Khayaban-i-Suhrawardy and the Kashmir Highway has been renamed Justice Sir Mian Abdul Rashid Avenue.
- Hilal-e-Pakistan (Crescent of Pakistan) Award by the President of Pakistan

== See also ==
- List of Pakistanis
- Chief Justice of Pakistan
- Arain

== Bibliography ==
- Khalid Latif Gauba (1944), The Rt. Hon'ble Sir Shadi Lal: Chief Justice of the High Court of Judicature at Lahore, 1920-1934; a Bibliographical Sketch, Law Book Depot, p. 126

Legal offices
New office	Chief Justice of Pakistan; 1949–1954	Succeeded by Muhammad Munir
