= Anjuman-i-Himayat-i-Islam =

Social welfare organisation in Pakistan and India

Anjuman-i-Himayat-i-Islam (Urdu: انجمن حمایت اسلام, lit. 'The Association for the Support of Islam') or Anjuman-e-Himayat-e-Islam, is an Islamic intellectual and social welfare organisation with branches both in India and Pakistan. It was founded in Lahore on 24 September 1884 in a mosque known as Masjid Bakan inside Mochi Gate, Lahore, by Qazi Hamiduddin Khalifa.

== History and background ==
The Indian Rebellion of 1857 against the British Empire also known as the War of Independence of 1857 was an important and historical milestone in the history of South Asia. Many political and social movements were later inspired by it, including the Aligarh Movement, founded by Sir Syed Ahmad Khan, and the Aligarh Muslim University (founded in 1878).

Anjuman-i-Himayat-i-Islam was founded in Lahore on 22 September 1884 in a mosque known as Masjid Bakan inside Mochi Gate, Lahore, by Khalifa Qazi Hameed-ud-Din. Association's first President was Abdul Qadir (1872 – 1950) who was a political activist and scholar.

One of its major efforts was the foundation of a number of schools for Muslim girls and orphanages in the Punjab, where girls were taught Urdu, the Qur'an, mathematics, needlework, and crafts. It started a publishing house for appropriate textbooks for Muslim girls' and boys' schools, and these textbooks were used all over the Punjab and beyond. In 1939, it founded the Islamia College for Women in Lahore, the only one of its kind in the region, whose curriculum was the standard Bachelor of Arts program, supplemented by Islamic education. It also founded Islamia College Lahore in 1892.

The Anjuman-i-Himayat-i-Islam was a body that represented a spontaneous desire on the part of middle-class Muslims of Lahore to cooperate with each other for common good. The Anjuman also played a vital role to provide a political platform for Indian Muslims.

Later, a number of other institutions were initiated in Pakistan under the auspices of or partially supported by the Anjuman. One of such most prominent schools which gained recognition and was later turned into a full-fledged government-run public high school is the Himayat-ul-Islam High School in Hyderabad, Sindh, which has two distinct sections, the Himayat-ul-Islam Boys and Girls High Schools. The school was initiated by a prominent Shaikh Sindhi family in Hyderabad in the 1960s by granting their property with the sole aim of extending English-medium quality education to the masses.

== Achievements ==
The association is composed of Muslim intellectuals and politicians seeking to reform Muslim society and work on its development. Some of its most prominent members included the famous poet Sir Muhammad Iqbal (1877 – 1938), who recited his first poems at the sessions of the Anjuman. Its purpose is the educational uplift of Muslims of the Indian subcontinent.

"The Anjuman established educational institutions in arts, sciences and technology for men and women as well as orphanages for helpless Muslims, to which widows' homes were later added. The Moplah orphans, the victims of Bihar and Quetta earthquakes, and later the destitute children and widows of the 1947 holocaust, found shelter at these orphanages."

"A landmark in the history of the Anjuman publication was the production of an absolutely correct text of the Holy Quran."

== Publications ==
- Risala-e-Anjuman-e-Himayat-e-Islam (first published in 1885)

== Programs and services ==
In addition to numerous other charitable services, the Anjuman runs:

- Yateem Khana (an orphanage, established 1884)
- Islamia College (Lahore) (established 1892)

=== Public schools ===
- Dar-ul-Shafqat (for males only)
- Dar-ul-Shafqat (for females only)
- Dar-ul-Aman (for females only)
- Dar-ul-Uloom Deenia (for both males and females)
- Hamayat-e-Islam High School (for boys)
- Hamayat-e-Islam Pasha Girls High School
- Hamayat-e-Islam Rajgarh School
- Hamayat-e-Islam Degree College (for women)
- Hamayat-e-Islam Law College
- Hamayat-e-Islam Tibbya College
- Hamayat-e-Islam Younani Shafa Khana
- Hamayat-e-Islam Library

== See also ==
- Anjuman Talaba-e-Islam
