= Drumcliff, County Clare =

Drumcliff Drom Cléibh
- Civil parish
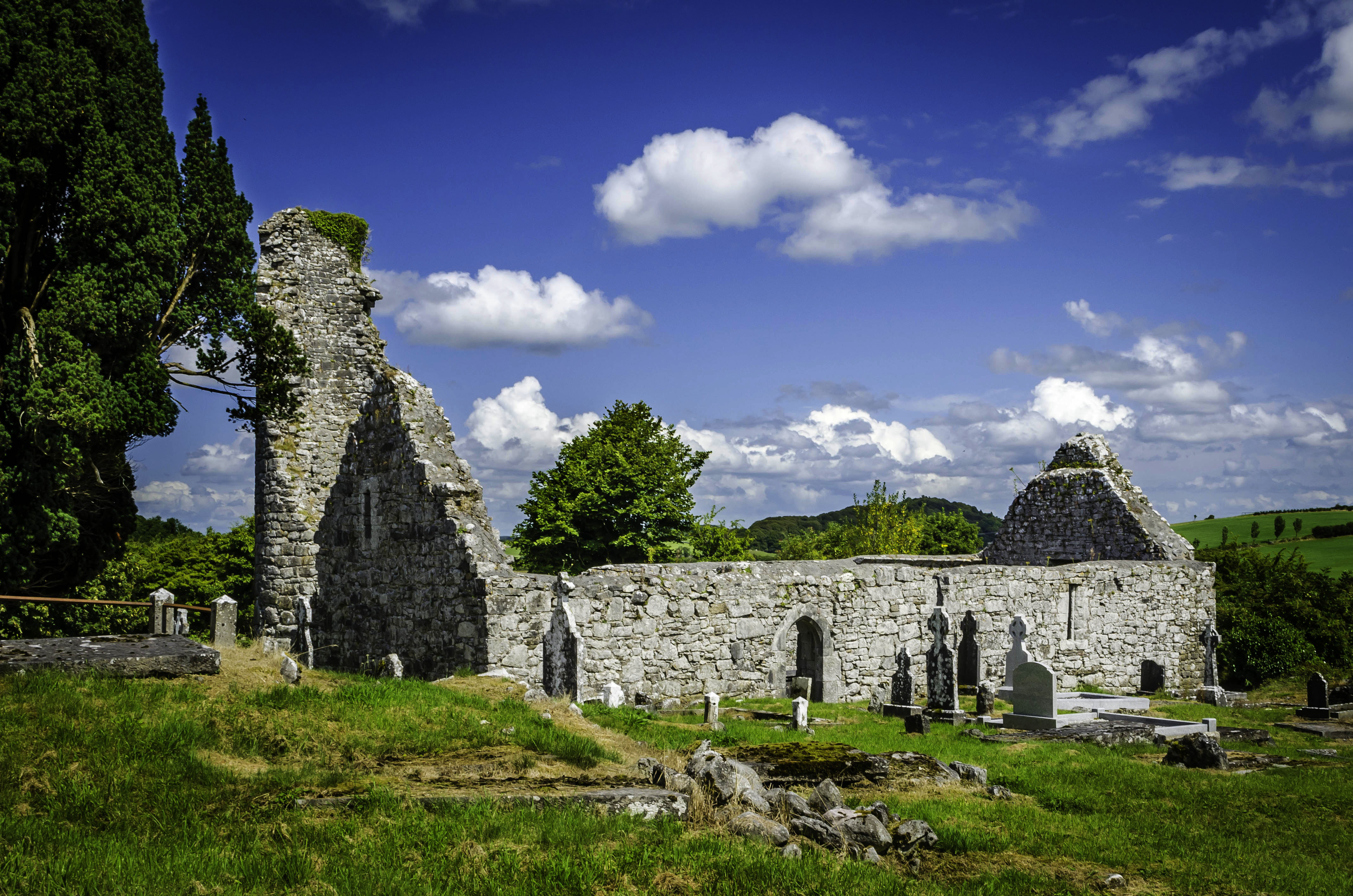
- Ruined abbey of Ennis

- Location within Ireland
- Coordinates: 52°52′06″N 9°00′04″W
- Country: Ireland
- Province: Munster
- County: County Clare
- Time zone: UTC+0 (WET)
  - Summer (DST): UTC-1 (IST (WEST))

Drumcliff, or Drumcliffe, Dromcliffe (Irish: Drom Cléibh) is a civil parish in County Clare, Ireland. It includes the village of Inch and part of the town of Ennis.

== Location ==
The parish of Drumcliff is in the barony of Islands, and lies on the River Fergus on the road from Limerick to Galway. It is 5 by 4.5 miles (8.0 by 7.2 km), covering 9,968 acres (4,034 ha). There are two holy wells in Drumcliff, one dedicated to Saint Kieran in Rathkerry and the other dedicated to Saint Ineenboy at Croaghaun.

== History ==
The townland of Clonroad became the main seat of the O'Briens around 1200. Donogh Cairbreagh O'Brien built a circular earthen fort on the south side of the river, opposite Ennis. Around 1240 he built a large Franciscan monastery at Ennis. Later Turlogh O'Brien built a stone castle near the bridge of Clonroad. It was one of the Earl of Thomond's residences for three hundred years, then was demolished and the stone used to build the house for Mr. Gore, the new proprietor. In 1580 Conor MacClancy had a castle at Inchbeg.

In 1831 the population was 12,392, almost all Catholics. Including Ennis, the population was 14,083. The old church was in ruins. The churchyard contained the mass grave of 340 cholera victims. Writing in 1893, James Frost said "The church of Drumcliff is composed of various patchings, made from time to time as the building wanted repairs or the congregation more room. No part of it seems to be of great antiquity except a window on the south wall, and part of one in the east gable."

Near to the church there was the remains of an old round tower, still about 50 feet (15 m) high. The door is about 20 feet (6.1 m) above ground level, and has a molding round it. The old cemetery contains the Republican plot, for members of the Irish Republican Army killed in the Irish War of Independence and the Irish Civil War.

== Townlands ==
The parish contains the townlands of Ballylannidy, Ballymacaula, Bushypark, Cahircalla (Beg), Cahircalla (More), Claureen, Cloghleagh, Clonroad (Beg), Clonroad (More), Cloonfeagh, Coor, Cragleagh, Cragnagower, Croaghaun, Drumbiggil, Drumcaran (Beg), Drumcaran (More), Drumcliff, Fountain, Gortmore, Inchbeg, Inch More, Keelty, Kilnacally, Kilquane, Knock, Knockaninaun, Lifford, Loughvella, Mahonburgh, Nooaff (East), Nooaff (West), Rathcraggaun, Rathkerry, Shantulla, Shanvogh, Tullagh and Tullassa.

The town of Ennis, which also covers parts of the civil parishes of Doora, Kilraghtis and Templemaley, includes the townlands of Cahircalla Beg, Cahircalla More, Claureen, Cloghleagh, Clonroad Beg, Clonroad More, Drumbiggil, Drumcliff, Lifford, Loughvella and Shanvogh.

== Roman-Catholic Church ==
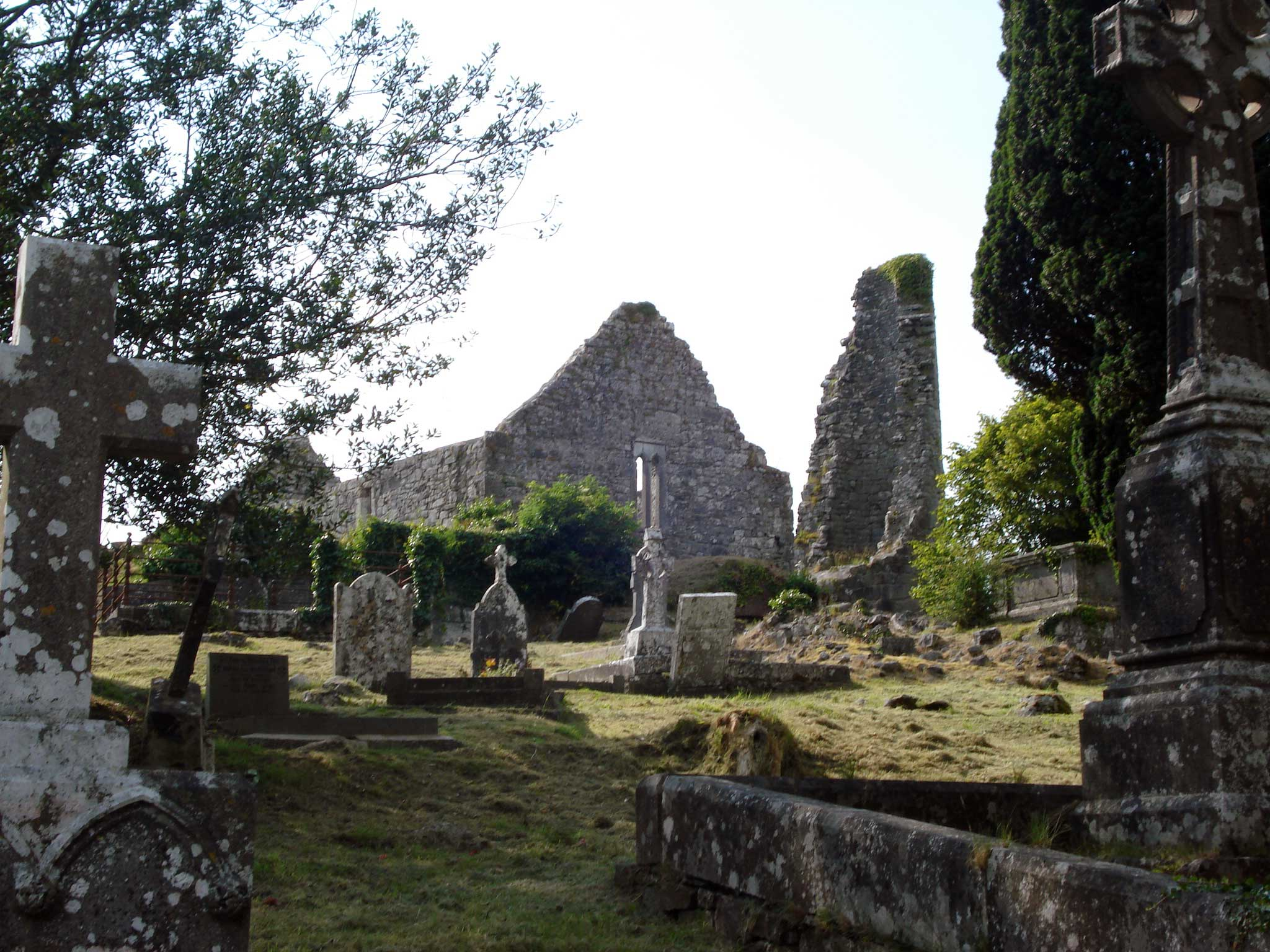
The ruined church and round tower at the old Drumcliff Cemetery

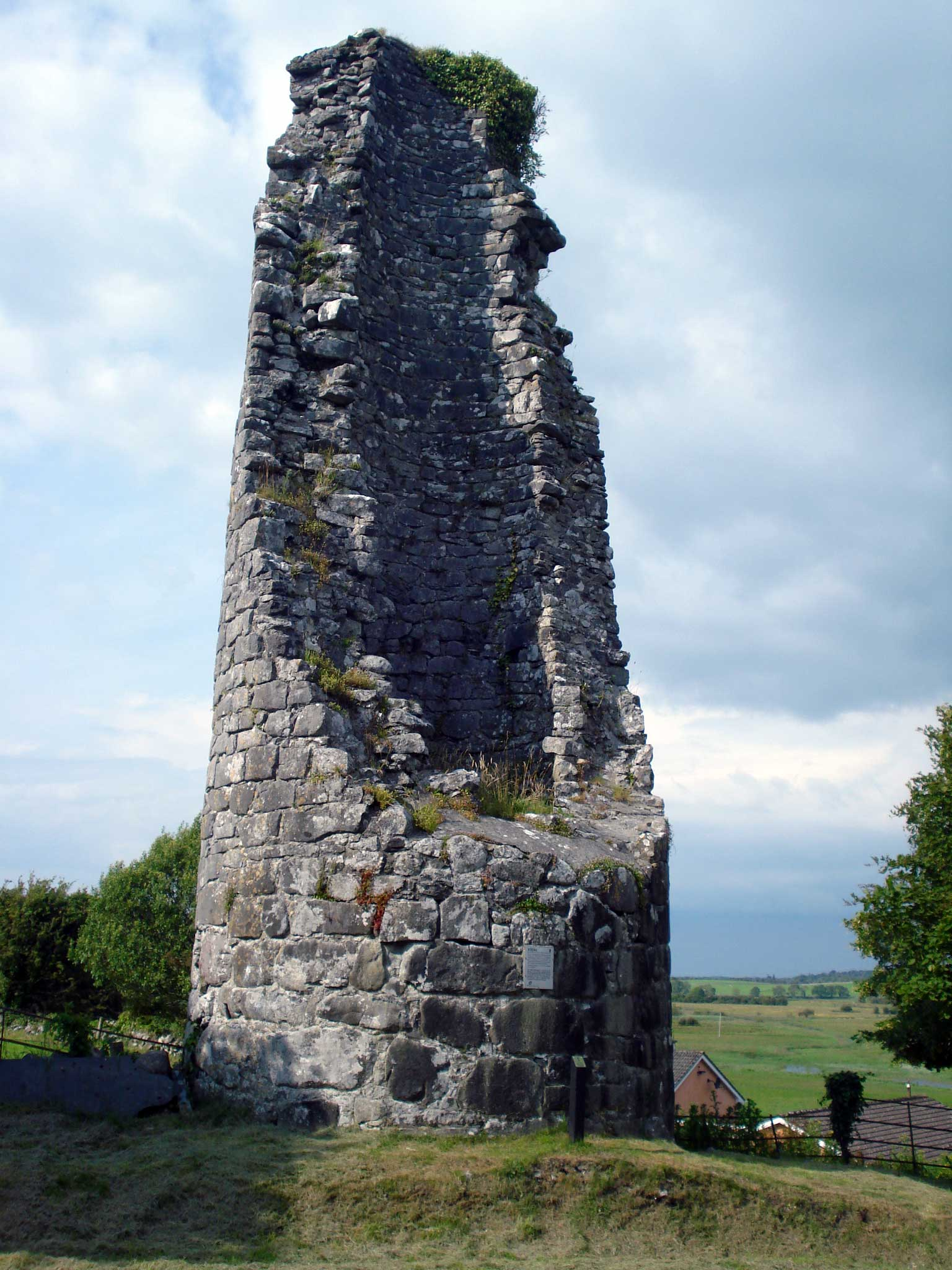
The remains of the round tower at the old Drumcliff Cemetery

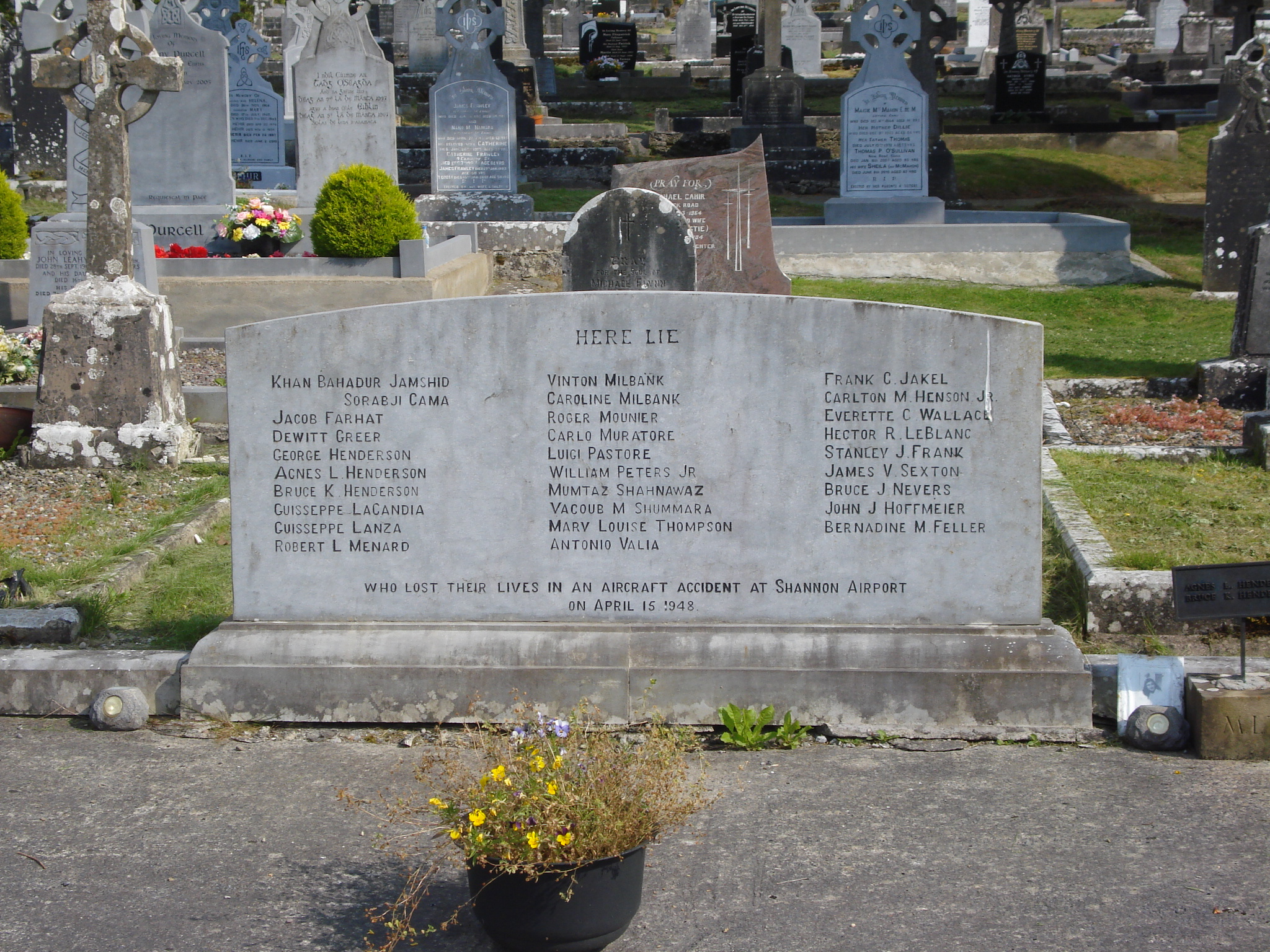
Memorial for the victims of the Pan Am crash at Shannon Airport
