= The Pakistan Times =

Pakistani newspaper

- Front page from edition published on 31 January 1948
- Type: Daily newspaper
- Format: Tabloid (from beginning to 30 June 1949), Broadsheet (from 1 July 1949 till end)
- Owner: Progressive Papers Limited
- Founder: Mian Iftikharuddin
- Founded: 4 February 1947
- Ceased publication: 25 May 1996
- Political alignment: Left-wing
- Headquarters: Lahore (Other stations: Rawalpindi, Islamabad)
- Country: Pakistan

The Pakistan Times (1947–1996) was a Pakistani newspaper, established by Mian Itikharuddin and Faiz Ahmed Faiz through the leftist Progressive Papers Limited. Its headquarters was in Lahore, Pakistan. Later, it started another edition from Rawalpindi. The Rawalpindi edition was later shifted to Islamabad.

== Masthead ==
From beginning to 31 December 1948, the newspaper's masthead printed on the first page and back page contained the title Pakistan Times. However, on editorial page and other inside pages, the title of the newspaper was The Pakistan Times. From 1 January 1949, the masthead printed on the first page and back page also converted to the title The Pakistan Times.

== History ==
The Pakistan Times was owned and operated by Mian Iftikharuddin, a Punjabi politician formerly of the Indian National Congress but of the All-India Muslim League after 1946. The newspaper started publication on 4 February 1947 from Lahore. Its editor in the 1940s was the communist poet Faiz Ahmed Faiz. After his arrest in 1951 in connection with the Rawalpindi Conspiracy Case, Mazhar Ali Khan served as the editor-in-chief. The Pakistan Times continued to be an influential newspaper in the 1950s, with its disparaging criticism of the government in participating in the US-sponsored military alliances.

During the military regime of Ayub Khan, rigorous pre-censorship was imposed on the press including The Pakistan Times. In April 1959, the regime took over the Progressive Papers Limited under the Pakistan Security Act.

In 1964, the National Press Trust was set up by the Ayub government as a front organisation for managing the newspapers taken over by the government including The Pakistan Times.

In the 1980s, 10 journalists and management staff of The Pakistan Times were dismissed by the Zia ul-Haq regime for their connections to the Movement for the Restoration of Democracy and for signing an appeal for "Peace in Sindh" movement.

Disinvestment and privatisation of companies and newspapers belonging to the National Press Trust took place in 1996. The same year, The Pakistan Times was closed down.

== Bibliography ==
- Jaffrelot, Christophe (2015), The Pakistan Paradox: Instability and Resilience, Oxford University Press, ISBN 978-0-19-023518-5
- Kalia, Ravi (2015), Pakistan's Political Labyrinths: Military, Society and Terror, Routledge, ISBN 978-1-317-40544-3
- Tikekar, Maneesha (2004), Across the Wagah: An Indian's Sojourn in Pakistan, Bibliophile South Asia, ISBN 978-81-85002-34-7
