= Mian Muhammad Shahnawaz =

Pakistani politician

Mian Sir Shah Nawaz CIE was a prominent politician of Punjab in the 1920s. He was married to Begum Jahanara Shahnawaz daughter of Mian Muhammad Shafi. He was born in the Arain Mian family of Baghbanpura.

Shah Nawaz was a member of the Punjab Council, 1921–1926, elected from Lahore Rual Constituency. Later, he was elected to the Central Legislative Assembly, 1926–1934, from the West Central Punjab constituency.
