= Arain =

Pakistani Punjabi agricultural community

Arain Raeen, Rain or Arai
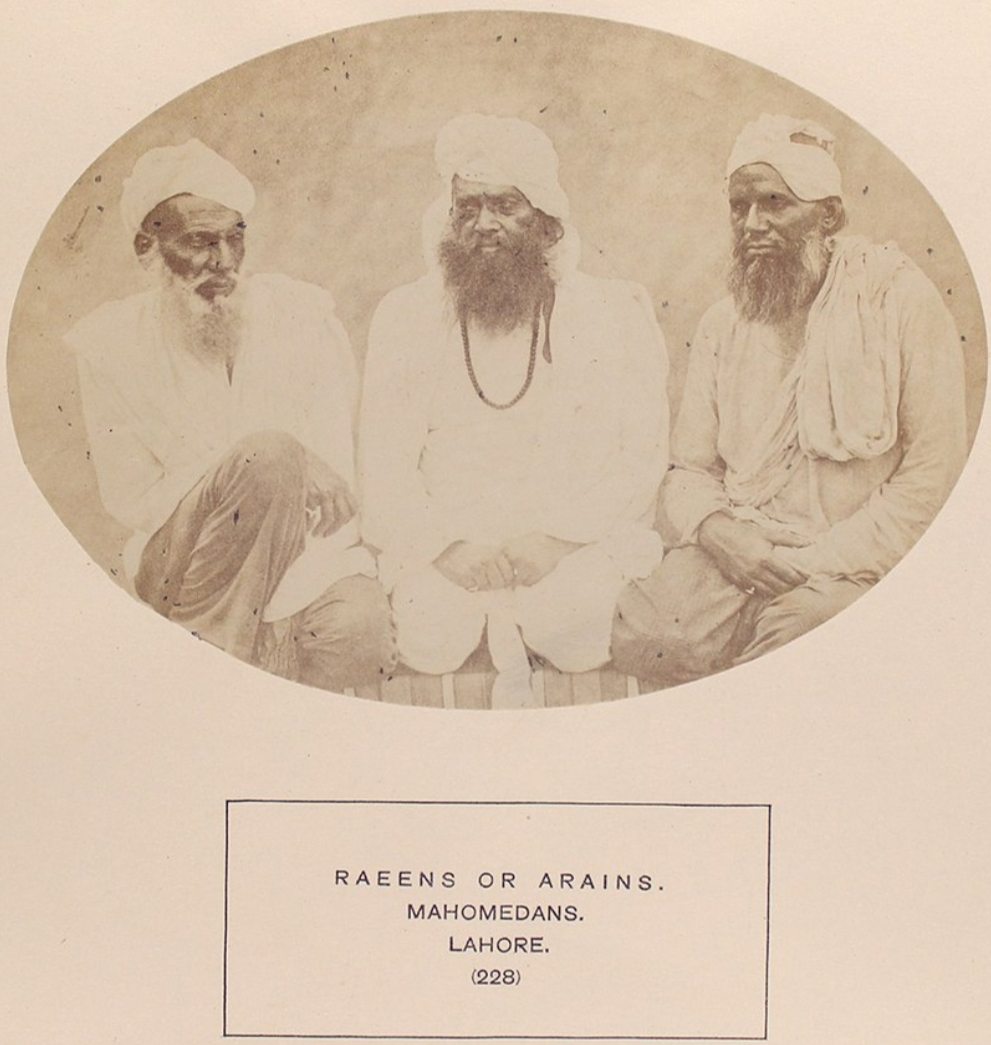
- Raeens or Arains, Lahore
- Ethnicity: Punjabi
- Location: Punjab, Sindh and Western Uttar Pradesh
- Language: Punjabi
- Religion: Islam with minority being Hindu and Sikh

Arain (also known as Raeen) are a large Punjabi agricultural community with a strong political identity and level of organisation. Arain are predominantly Muslims, 99.91% at the time of the 1931 census in Punjab, but a small population of Arain in India also follows Sikhism, Hinduism and Jainism.

At the beginning of the last century, they numbered around 1 million and were mainly rural cultivators and landowners concentrated in four districts: Lahore, Jalandhar, Amritsar and Ambala, all in the British Punjab province. Following the 1947 partition of India, they are now mainly present in the Pakistani provinces of Punjab and Sindh with a small population in parts of Indian Punjab, Uttar Pradesh and Uttarakhand.

A self-conscious community, several meetings were held to establish an organisation to represent the Arain community in the 1890s. Eventually, in 1915, Anjuman Ra’iyan-i-Hind emerged as such a body in Lahore and a national community newspaper, titled Al-Rai, was established.

== History ==
=== Origins ===
Ishtiaq Ahmed, a political scientist who is also a member of the Arain community, acknowledges that some early Arain texts ascribe a Suryavanshi Rajput origin, while others note a Persian one to reflect to others the status of being "conquerors". He believes that the Arains "are a mix of many ethnicities and races", similar to other "farming castes of the Punjab and Haryana". K. S. Singh believes that Arain and Kamboh are closely related, with the distinction being mostly religious as the former were predominantly Muslims.

=== Medieval period ===
According to Ahmed, during the Mughal and Sikh periods Arain held prominent positions, such as governors and army generals; he also believes that numerous names adopted by the community may indicate a tradition of military employment.

=== Colonial period ===
During the Indian rebellion of 1857, Shah Abdul Qadir Ludhianvi, an Arain, led an uprising from Ludhiana to Delhi where he was killed. In the aftermath, the British viewed the Arain as a disloyal community, and categorised them as a non-martial caste which denied them entry into the Bengal Army. Due to lobbying by the Arain community, in the early 20th century the Arain were officially re-classified as an "agricultural tribe", then effectively synonymous with the martial race classification.

Traditionally associated with farming, when the British wanted land developed in the Punjab, Arain were brought in to cultivate lands around cities, and were one of the agricultural communities given preference to assist with opening up the agrarian frontier in the Canal Colonies between 1885 and 1940. Shahid Javed Burki says that the British favoured the Arain for their "hard work, frugality and sense of discipline". The development of towns and cities and increasing urbanisation resulted in the value of the land settled by Arain to rise significantly, and Arain families flourished. Education was prioritised with the new-found wealth and Arain came to dominate the legal profession amongst urban Punjabi Muslims. Many used law to enter politics.

During the colonial era, detailed decadal census reports covered the plethora of castes, subcastes and tribes that existed throughout British India. Information regarding the Arains was highlighted in census reports taken from Punjab Province.

"Arains are mostly Muhammadans. They have been declared an agricultural tribe throughout the Province with the exception of the Rohtak, Gurgaon, Simla, Kangra, Jhelum, Rawalpindi and Attock Districts, where their number is very limited. Apparently a functional caste with a strong nucleus of converted Kambohs, some of whom still call themselves Kamboh Arains. There are still 1,186 Hindu Arains, mostly in Patiala (803) and Karnal (290), and the Kambohs have a sub-caste called Arain. The term is derived probably from Rain or Rahin, equivalent to Rahak (tiller of soil).".

— Excerpt from the Census of India (Punjab Province), 1911 AD

== Demographics ==
=== Numbers ===
In 1921, Arains formed 9,5% of British Punjab's total Muslim population, up from 8,3% in 1901 and 6,6% in 1881.

At the time of the 2017 Pakistan census, Arains constituted the largest community of the Lahore District, making up 40% of the district's total population or 4,45 million out of the total of 11 million back then, followed by Kashmiris (30%).

The Arain biradari is particularly active in Lahore's industrial and commercial activities as well as in its politics.

=== Religion ===
The 1881 Census of India detailed the Arain population was 795,032 in Punjab, of which 791,552 (99.56 percent) were Muslims, 2,628 (0.33 percent) were Hindus, 848 (0.11 percent) were Sikhs, and 4 (0.0005 percent) were Christians. (Note: Population excludes districts that would ultimately form part of the North-West Frontier Province.)

As of 1931 Census of India, out of the total Arain population of 1,331,295 in Punjab, 1,330,057 (99.91%) were Muslims, 1,146 (0.086%) were Hindus, 67 (0.005%) were Sikhs and 5 (0.00038%) were Christians.

Academic Ashish Koul, who specializes in the history of the group, has said of the Arains that they have been "a distinctive Muslim community with innately Islamic attributes."

=== Diaspora ===
There are several diasporic Arain communities in British towns and cities, such as Manchester, Glasgow and Oxford. The tribe has its own organisation, Arain Council UK, which was established as Anjuman-e-Arains in the 1980s and renamed in 2008.

British Conservative Party politician Sajid Javid's family were farmers from the village of Rajana near Toba Tek Singh, Punjab, from where they migrated to the UK in the 1960s; Javid speaks some Punjabi. Javid was the first British Asian to hold one of the British Great Offices of State, being first Home Secretary (2018–2019) and then Chancellor of the Exchequer (2019–2020).

== Arain clans ==
Clan	Population
Clan	1881 census
Jatali	33,267
Gehlan	33,187
Bhutta	32,603
Chandor	27,506
Ramay	24,401
Nain	21,924
Bhatti	16,688
Multani	13,893
Chachar	10,616
Dhange	10,251
Hansi	9712
Bhedu	8836
Janjua	8108
Bahman	7120
Dhudhi	6628
Goher	6263
Malani	6250
Galru	4485
Ghalar	4363
Wahand	2815
Balgoria	2809
Munda	2298
Qutb Shahi	557

Arain clans not listed on the census but have been noted by British Raj era authors:

- Khokhar
- Jhanjhuna
- Arki
- Brar
- Kamboj
- Tarar

== Notable people ==
=== Politics ===
- Adina Beg, last Mughal Governor and the only Nawab of Punjab.
- Mian Shah Din, first Muslim judge at the Chief Court of the Punjab
- Mian Iftikharuddin, activist and politician, founder of the Pakistan Times
- Sajid Javid, former British Home Secretary and Chancellor of the Exchequer
- Sir Mian Abdul Rashid, first Chief Justice of Pakistan
- Anas Sarwar, leader of the Scottish Labour Party
- Chaudhry Mohammad Sarwar, businessman, Labour Party MP and 33rd Governor of the Punjab
- Sir Mian Muhammad Shafi, lawyer and co-founder of All-India Muslim League
- Jahanara Shahnawaz, politician and All-India Muslim League activist
- Sir Mian Muhammad Shahnawaz, politician
- Muhammad Zia-ul-Haq, the 6th President of Pakistan
- Mian Abdul Bari, Leader of the Opposition in the Provincial Assembly of the Punjab.

=== Arts and literature ===
- Shah Inayat Qadiri, Sufi scholar better known as the teacher of Bulleh Shah
- Qudratullah Shahab, Pakistani writer and diplomat

=== Entertainment ===
- Sultan Rahi, Pakistani actor
- Tariq Aziz, Pakistani television personality
- Sonia Ahmed, President of Miss Pakistan World Mrs. Pakistan World

=== Sports ===
- Wasim Akram, Pakistani cricketer
- Abdul Hafeez Kardar, Pakistani cricketer, politician and diplomat

=== Military ===
- Fazal Din, Indian soldier in World War II, recipient of the Victoria Cross

== See also ==
- List of Punjabi Muslim tribes
