= Mian Muhammad Shafi =

Member of Imperial Legislative Council of India

Sir Mian Muhammad Shafi KCSI CIE
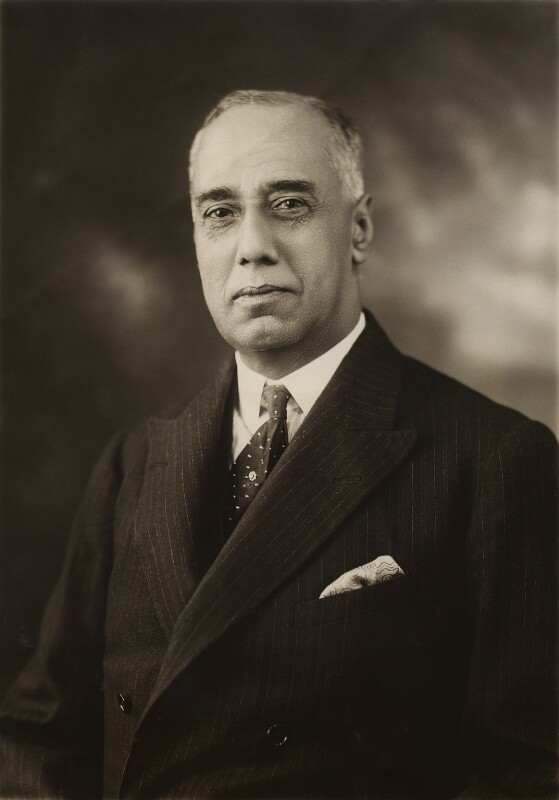
- Born: 10 March 1869; Lahore, Punjab, British India
- Died: 7 January 1932 (aged 62); Lahore, Punjab, British India
- Education: Government College, Lahore; Forman Christian College; Middle Temple
- Occupation: Politician
- Known for: Co-founder of All-India Muslim League

Sir Mian Muhammad Shafi, KCSI CIE (10 March 1869 – 7 January 1932) was a politician and statesman in British India. He supported and represented various Muslim educational, national and religious causes and was a founding member of the All-India Muslim League.

== Early life and education ==
Mian Muhammad Shafi was born to Mian Din Muhammad on 10 March 1869 in Baghbanpura, near Lahore. He belonged to the aristocratic Arain Mian family of Baghbanpura, a landowning family of the Punjab with landholdings in multiple districts including Sheikhupura, Lyallpur, Bahawalpur and Layyah. The Mian family was appointed as hereditary custodians of the Shalimar Gardens by Mughal Emperor Shah Jehan. Other notable family members include Sir Abdul Rashid, Mian Shah Din, Begum Jahanara Shahnawaz, Mian Iftikharuddin and Mian Bashir Ahmed.

Mian Muhammad Shafi was educated at Government College, Lahore as well as Forman Christian College, Lahore. In 1889 he went to London to study for the Bar and was admitted at Middle Temple where his cousin Mian Shah Din had been studying for the past two years. Whilst in London he took an active role in politics, becoming president for a term of the London branch of the Anjuman-i-Islamia. He returned to India in 1892 and began his legal career in Hoshiarpur whilst also enrolling at the Allahabad and Lahore High Courts.

== Political career ==
Mian Muhammad Shafi was a supporter of the Pakistan Movement and an advocate against British rule. The name All-India Muslim League was proposed by a number of Muslims including Sir Mian Mohammad Shafi in the founding meeting of the League that was held on 30 December 1906 on the occasion of the annual All India Muhammadan Educational Conference, at the Ahsan Manzil Palace, Shahbagh, Dhaka that was hosted by Nawab Sir Khwaja Salimullah (1871 – 1915). The meeting was attended by 3,000 delegates and presided over by Nawab Waqar-ul-Mulk. The other founding members were Nawab Mohsin-ul-Mulk, Syed Ameer Ali, and Mualana Mohammad Ali Jouhar.

Mian Muhammad Shafi organized a Muslim association in early 1906, but when the All-India Muslim League was formed, he established its powerful branch in the Punjab of which he became the general secretary. This branch, organized in November 1907, was known as the Punjab Provincial Muslim League.

He was also a member of the Simla Deputation in 1906. In 1909, and again in 1912, Shafi was nominated to the Provincial Legislative Council. In 1911, 1914, 1917, he was a member of the Imperial Legislative Council. He was appointed a CIE in 1916. In July 1919, Mian Muhammad Shafi, who had been elected as the president of the Chief Court Bar, became a member of the Viceroy's Executive Council during 1919–24. His tenure as Education Member was marked by many important developments, including the setting up of the Aligarh Muslim University. He was also acting vice-president of the Governor-General's Executive Council 1922–25. He was Council's member for education, health and later also for law; also, he was knighted in 1925 with the KCSI.

After completing his term, he again became active in Muslim politics and played an important role when the Simon Commission visited India and, again, at the first Round Table Conference 1930–31.

His two daughters namely Begum Jahan Ara Shah Nawaz and Begum Geti Ara Bashir Ahmad earned fame as leading Muslim women who took active part in the Pakistan Movement. He was married to Mehrunissa, elder sister of Sir Abdul Rashid.

== Death ==
He died on 7 January 1932 and was buried in his ancestral graveyard in Baghbanpura, Lahore. Sir Shafi was married twice and was survived by his children: Mian Muhammad Rafi, Begum Jahan Ara Shah Nawaz, Begum Geti Ara Bashir Ahmad and Mian Iqbal Shafi.

== Titles ==
- 1869–1916: Mian Muhammad Shafi (he had just one title 'Mian' during this period)
- 1916–1925: Mian Muhammad Shafi, CIE (the title of 'Sir' by the British government was added in 1919)
- 1925–1932: Sir Mian Muhammad Shafi, KCSI, CIE (Knighted by the British government in 1925)

== See also ==
- Mian family of Baghbanpura
- Arain
