= 1964 in Pakistan =

- Decades: 1940s; 1950s; 1960s; 1970s; 1980s
- See also: History of Pakistan; List of years in Pakistan; Timeline of Pakistani history

Events from the year 1964 in Pakistan.

== Incumbents ==
- President: Ayub Khan
- Chief Justice: A.R. Cornelius

== Events ==
=== January ===
- 2 January – Anti-Hindu riots begin in Khulna, East Pakistan. They and reciprocal riots in Calcutta would fuel waves of communal violence on either side of the border over the next few months.
- 6 January – The governor of West Pakistan bans opposition party Jamaat-e-Islami, and its leader, Abul A'la Maududi, is arrested.

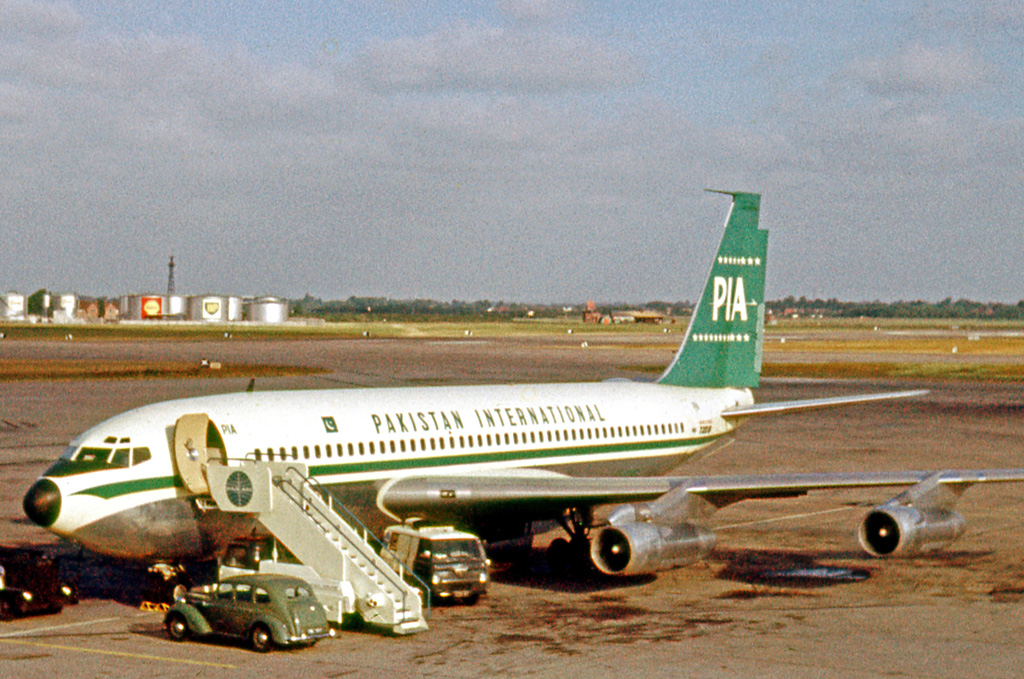
Karachi–Shanghai flights were made by PIA Boeing 720Bs like this one at London Heathrow.

=== April ===
- 11 April – A tornado in the Narail and Magura regions of Jessore District in East Pakistan destroys villages and kills as many as 500 people.
- 29 April – Pakistan International Airlines (PIA) inaugurates regular scheduled flights from Karachi to Shanghai via Dacca and Canton using a Boeing 720B, becoming the first airline of a non-communist country to fly to the People's Republic of China.

=== June ===
- 1 June – Pakistan acquires from the United States its first submarine, the PNS Ghazi.

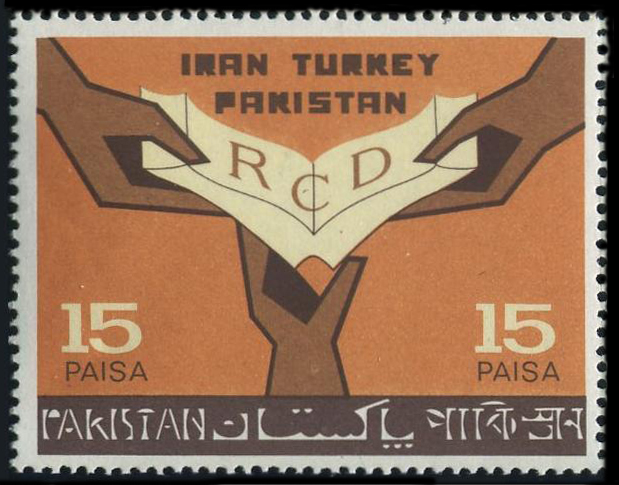
Iran, Pakistan, and Turkey agreed on Regional Cooperation for Development.

=== July ===
- 22 July – The heads of state of Iran, Pakistan and Turkey issue a joint communique from Istanbul, establishing the Regional Cooperation for Development (RCD).

=== August ===
- 29 August – President Ayub Khan inaugurates the Chittagong Press Club.

=== September ===
- 25 September – The Supreme Court overturns the banning of Jamaat-e-Islami on the ground that the ban, enacted without due process, violated the fundamental right of freedom of association.

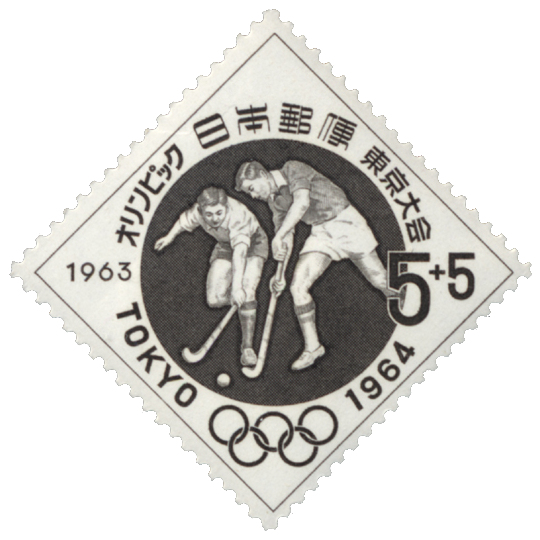
Pakistan won the silver medal in field hockey at the 1964 Summer Olympics in Tokyo.

=== October ===
- 23 October
  - Pakistan loses 0–1 to India in field hockey at the 1964 Summer Olympics in Tokyo, taking home the silver medal.
  - Eastern Tubes Limited in Dacca is incorporated to manufacture fluorescent tubes.

=== November ===
- 26 November – The country's first television station goes on air in Lahore, operated on a pilot basis by NEC.

== Births ==
=== February ===
- 7 February – Nadir Shah, Bangladeshi cricket umpire (d. 2021)
- 10 February – Mir Aimal Kansi, perpetrator of the CIA headquarters shooting (d. 1998)

=== March ===
- 15 March – Kunwar Naveed Jamil, politician (d. 2023)
- 20 March – Sadiq Fakir, folk singer (d. 2015)

=== April ===
- 14 April – Manna, Bangladeshi actor (d. 2008)

=== May ===
- 11 May – Haseeb-ul-Hasan, cricketer (d. 1990)

=== August ===
- 4 August – Ghulam Murtaza Baloch, politician (d. 2020)
- 14 August – Hussain Shah Syed, boxer

=== October ===
- 18 October – Sheikh Russel, youngest child of Sheikh Mujibur Rahman (d. 1975)

=== November ===
- 6 November – Mizanur Rahman Khan Dipu, Bangladeshi politician (d. 2013)

=== December ===
- 24 December – Shahid Ali Khan, field hockey goalkeeper

== Deaths ==
=== April ===
- 10 April – Shamsunnahar Mahmud, politician (b. 1908)

=== October ===
- 2 October – Nur Ahmed, politician (b. 1890)
- 3 October – Harendra Kumar Sur, politician (b. 1893)
- 5 October – Birat Chandra Mandal, politician (b. 1893/1894)
- 13 October – Golam Mostofa, Bengali poet and writer (b. 1897)
- 22 October – Khawaja Nazimuddin, Prime Minister of Pakistan (b. 1894)

=== November ===
- 15 November – Abdul Latif Biswas, politician (b. 1897)

=== December ===
- 23 December – Khan Bahadur Abdur Rahman Khan, educator (b. 1889/1890)

== See also ==
- List of Pakistani films of 1964
