= 1967 in Pakistan =

- Decades: 1940s; 1950s; 1960s; 1970s; 1980s
- See also: History of Pakistan; List of years in Pakistan; Timeline of Pakistani history

Events from the year 1967 in Pakistan.

== Incumbents ==
=== Federal government ===
- President: Ayub Khan
- Chief Justice: A.R. Cornelius

== Events ==
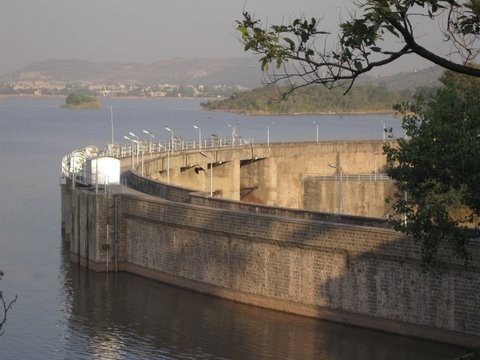
By 1967, infrastructure such as Rawal Dam was in place, but much of Islamabad was still under construction.

=== March ===
- 17 March – For the first time, the birthday of Sheikh Mujibur Rahman was celebrated by his party Awami League publicly in East Pakistan.

=== April ===
- 26 April – For the first time, the cabinet meets in the new capital, Islamabad.

=== May ===
- 1 May – Five opposition parties: the National Democratic Front, Council Muslim League, Jamaat-e-Islami, Pakistan Awami League, and Nizam-e-Islam Party, form an alliance called the Pakistan Democratic Movement.

=== June ===
- 23 June – The government bans the broadcast on Radio Pakistan of Tagore Songs, angering the country's Bengali population, who consider the songs part of their cultural identity.

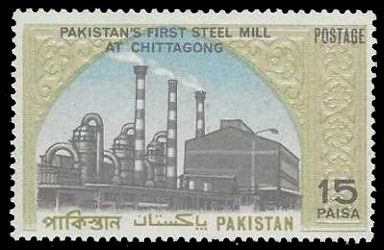
When opening the Chittagong Steel Mill, Ayub Khan promised further investment in East Pakistan to reduce its economic disparity with West Pakistan.

=== August ===
- 24 August – The country's first steel mill, designed to produce 150,000 tons of steel annually, is inaugurated in Chittagong, East Pakistan.

=== November ===
- 6 November
  - Pakistan is elected to the UN Security Council for a two-year term.
  - Cable Industries of Pakistan in Khulna is incorporated for the manufacturing of plastic-insulated telecom cables.
- 23 November – Mangla Dam, built for irrigation and power generation, is inaugurated.
- 30 November – The Pakistan People's Party is founded in Lahore, and Zulfikar Ali Bhutto is chosen as its chairman.

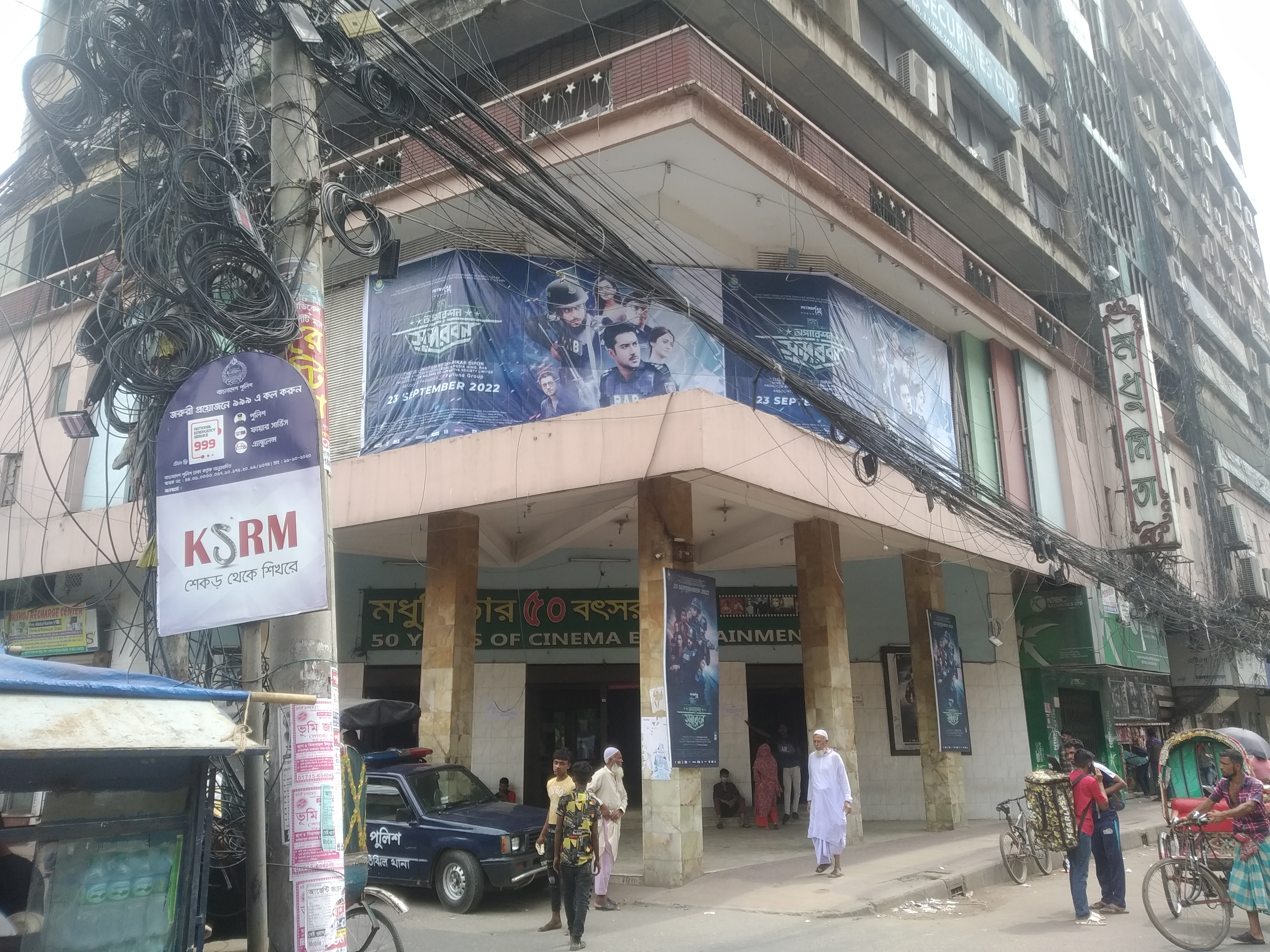
Modhumita cinema hall featured Operation Sundarbans in 2022.

=== December ===
- 1 December – Modhumita cinema hall opens in Dacca, screening the 1963 Hollywood epic Cleopatra.
- December – The National Awami Party splinters into two groups, the pro-China National Awami Party (Bhashani) and the pro-Moscow National Awami Party (Wali).

== Births ==
=== January ===
- 12 January – Ali Mohammad Mahar, politician (d. 2019)

=== April ===
- 1 April – Lalak Jan, soldier who received Pakistan's highest military award, the Nishan-e-Haider (d. 1999)

=== September ===
- 6 September – Nasir Wasti, cricketer (d. 2006)

=== October ===
- 3 October – Najeebullah Khan Niazi, politician (d. 2014)
- 4 October – Aamer Hanif, cricketer
- 15 October – Waqar Ahmad Khan, politician (d. 2022)

=== December ===
- 12 December – Qazi Ashfaq, footballer (d. 2001)

== Deaths ==
=== January ===
- 20 January – Madar Bux, politician (b. 1907)

=== April ===
- 6 April – Ramesh Shil, Bengali bard (b. 1877)

=== May ===
- 29 May – Golam Moula, physician and politician (b. 1920)

=== June ===
- 23 June – Raushan Yazdani, folklorist (b. 1917)

=== July ===
- 9 July – Fatima Jinnah, politician (b. 1893)

=== September ===
- 2 September – Ayet Ali Khan, musician (b. 1884)

=== November ===
- 14 November – Syed Ziaul Ahsan, politician (b. 1917)
- 21 November – Abdul Waseque, politician (b. 1909)

=== December ===
- 28 December – Syed Abdus Salim, politician (b. 1905)

== See also ==
- List of Pakistani films of 1967
