= 1973 in Pakistan =

- Decades: 1950s; 1960s; 1970s; 1980s; 1990s
- See also: History of Pakistan; List of years in Pakistan; Timeline of Pakistani history

Events from the year 1973 in Pakistan.

== Incumbents ==
=== Federal government ===
- President: Zulfikar Ali Bhutto (until 13 August), Fazal Ilahi Chaudhry (starting 14 August)
- Prime Minister: Zulfikar Ali Bhutto (starting 14 August)
- Chief Justice: Hamoodur Rahman

=== Governors ===
- Governor of Balochistan: Ghaus Bakhsh Bizenjo (until 15 February); Nawab Akbar Khan Bugti (starting 15 February)
- Governor of Khyber Pakhtunkhwa: Arbab Sikandar Khan (until 15 February); Aslam Khattak (starting 15 February)
- Governor of Punjab: Ghulam Mustafa Khar (until 12 November); Sadiq Hussain Qureshi (starting 12 November)
- Governor of Sindh: Mir Rasool Bux Talpur (until 15 February); Begum Ra'ana Liaquat Ali Khan (starting 15 February)

== Events ==
- February, 1973 raid on the Iraqi embassy in Pakistan
- 10 April, the 1973 Constitution of Pakistan is passed.
- 14 August, Zulfikar Ali Bhutto is elected Prime Minister of Pakistan.
- October, 1973 Arab-Israeli War

== Births ==
- 15 August – Adnan Sami, music composer, singer, pianist
- 7 November – Adnan Aslam, writer

== See also ==
- List of Pakistani films of 1973
