= 1976 in Pakistan =

- Decades: 1950s; 1960s; 1970s; 1980s; 1990s
- See also: History of Pakistan; List of years in Pakistan; Timeline of Pakistani history

Events from the year 1976 in Pakistan.

== Incumbents ==
=== Federal government ===
- President: Fazal Ilahi Chaudhry
- Prime Minister: Zulfikar Ali Bhutto
- Chief Justice: Muhammad Yaqub Ali

=== Governors ===
- Governor of Balochistan: Ahmad Yar Khan
- Governor of Khyber Pakhtunkhwa: Syed Ghawas (until 1 March); Naseerullah Babar (starting 1 March)
- Governor of Punjab: Mohammad Abbas Abbasi
- Governor of Sindh: Begum Ra'ana Liaquat Ali Khan (until 28 February); Muhammad Dilawar Khanji (starting 1 March)

== Events ==
- Five years after the secession of East Pakistan, Pakistan begins diplomatic relations with Bangladesh.
- The Samjhauta Express, the only rail link between Pakistan and India, starts running.
- The Quaid-i-Azam Academy is established on the 100th anniversary of the birth of Pakistan's founder.

== Deaths ==
- 29 April – Munawar Zarif

== See also ==
- List of Pakistani films of 1976
