= 1975 in Pakistan =

- Decades: 1950s; 1960s; 1970s; 1980s; 1990s
- See also: History of Pakistan; List of years in Pakistan; Timeline of Pakistani history

Events from the year 1975 in Pakistan.

== Incumbents ==
=== Federal government ===
- President: Fazal Ilahi Chaudhry
- Prime Minister: Zulfikar Ali Bhutto
- Chief Justice: Hamoodur Rahman (until 1 November), Muhammad Yaqub Ali

=== Governors ===
- Governor of Balochistan: Ahmad Yar Khan
- Governor of Khyber Pakhtunkhwa: Syed Ghawas
- Governor of Punjab:
  - until 14 March: Sadiq Hussain Qureshi
  - 14 March-31 July: Ghulam Mustafa Khar
  - until 31 July: Mohammad Abbas Abbasi
- Governor of Sindh: Begum Ra'ana Liaquat Ali Khan

== Events ==
=== September ===
- Pakistan loses a hockey title match to India.

== Births ==
- 02 February - Nighat Yasmeen Khan
- 12 February – Shahzada Dawood (died 2023)
- 13 August – Shoaib Akhtar

== Deaths ==
- 8 February – Hayat Sherpao, Governor of Khyber Pakhtunkhwa (born 1937)
- 12 July – Zulfiqar Ali Bukhari, broadcaster (born 1904)

== See also ==
- List of Pakistani films of 1975
