= 1966 in Pakistan =

- Decades: 1940s; 1950s; 1960s; 1970s; 1980s
- See also: History of Pakistan; List of years in Pakistan; Timeline of Pakistani history

Events from the year 1966 in Pakistan.

== Incumbents ==
=== Federal government ===
- President: Ayub Khan
- Chief Justice: A.R. Cornelius

== Events ==
=== January ===
- 10 January – Ayub Khan and Indian Prime Minister Lal Bahadur Shastri sign the Tashkent Declaration to resolve the Indo-Pakistani War of 1965.

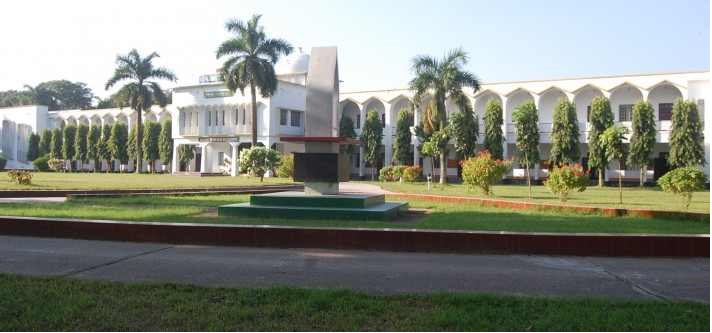
The adjutant of Ayub Cadet College would take sides against Ayub and the Pakistan Army in the Bangladesh Liberation War.

=== February ===
- 5 February – Sheikh Mujibur Rahman, general secretary of the East Pakistan Awami League, announces the Six Point Program calling for limiting the federal government to defence and foreign affairs.
- 11 February – Ayub Cadet College is inaugurated in Rajshahi, East Pakistan.

=== March ===
- 23 March - Sheikh Mujibur Rahman formally announces the Six Point Program.

=== May ===
- 4 May – SS Al-Abbas, the first ocean-going vessel constructed by the Karachi Shipyard & Engineering Works is launched.

=== November ===
- 18 November – Instruction begins at the University of Chittagong with 7 teachers and 200 students in 4 departments: Bangla, English, history, and economics.

=== December ===
- 31 December – After seven years, the Elective Bodies Disqualification Order expires, lifting the prohibition against standing for office from 70 politicians, including Sheikh Mujibur Rahman.

== Births ==
=== January ===
- 1 January – Muhammad Tajammal Hussain, politician (d. 2019)

=== March ===
- 2 March – Shahed Chowdhury, Bangladeshi film director (d. 2019)

=== May ===
- 25 May – Tina Khan, Bangladeshi actress (d. 1989)

=== June ===
- 3 June – Wasim Akram, cricketer
- 22 June – Khadim Hussain Rizvi, Islamic preacher (d. 2020)

=== September ===
- 14 September – Aamer Sohail, cricketer

== Deaths ==
=== January ===
- 8 January – A. T. M. Mustafa, lawyer (b. 1925)

=== April ===
- 15 April – Habibullah Bahar Chowdhury, politician (b. 1906)

=== October ===
- 13 October – Muhammad Ibrahim, judge and academic (b. 1894)

=== November ===
- 12 November – Shakeb Jalali, Urdu poet (b. 1934)

=== December ===
- December – Fazlur Rahman, politician (b. 1905)

== See also ==
- List of Pakistani films of 1966
