= 1974 in Pakistan =

- Decades: 1950s; 1960s; 1970s; 1980s; 1990s
- See also: History of Pakistan; List of years in Pakistan; Timeline of Pakistani history

Events from the year 1974 in Pakistan.

== Incumbents ==
=== Federal government ===
- President: Fazal Ilahi Chaudhry
- Prime Minister: Zulfikar Ali Bhutto
- Chief Justice: Hamoodur Rahman

=== Governors ===
- Governor of Balochistan: Nawab Akbar Khan Bugti (until 2 January); Ahmad Yar Khan (starting 2 January)
- Governor of Khyber Pakhtunkhwa: Aslam Khattak (until 24 May); Syed Ghawas (starting 24 May)
- Governor of Punjab: Sadiq Hussain Qureshi
- Governor of Sindh: Begum Ra'ana Liaquat Ali Khan

== Events ==
- In 1974, the students of Nishtar Medical College had an altercation with the Ahmadis in the Rabwah Railway Station. This event turned into a massive and violent anti-Ahmadiyya movement resulting in many casualties among Ahmadis and destruction of Ahmadiyya property.
- Three years after the secession of East Pakistan, Pakistan recognised Bangladesh.

== Births ==
- February 1 – Awal Khan, cricketer

== See also ==
- 1974 Anti-Ahmadiyya Movement
- List of Pakistani films of 1974
