= 1977 in Pakistan =

- Decades: 1950s; 1960s; 1970s; 1980s; 1990s
- See also: History of Pakistan; List of years in Pakistan; Timeline of Pakistani history

Events from the year 1977 in Pakistan.

== Incumbents ==
=== Federal government ===
- President: Fazal Ilahi Chaudhry
- Prime Minister: Zulfikar Ali Bhutto (until 5 July)
- Chief Justice: Muhammad Yaqub Ali (until 22 September), Sheikh Anwarul Haq

=== Governors ===
- Governor of Balochistan: Ahmad Yar Khan (until 5 July); Khuda Bakhsh Marri (starting 5 July)
- Governor of Khyber Pakhtunkhwa: Naseerullah Babar (until 6 July); Abdul Hakeem Khan (starting 6 July)
- Governor of Punjab: Mohammad Abbas Abbasi (until 5 July); Sawar Khan (starting 5 July)
- Governor of Sindh: Muhammad Dilawar Khanji (until 6 July); Abdul Kadir Shaikh (starting 6 July)

== Events ==
- 10 January – Nine opposition parties form joint election forum, Pakistan National Alliance (PNA).
- 7 March – Zulfikar Ali Bhutto's political party Pakistan Peoples Party (PPP) wins elections. PPP wins 155, PNA 35 seats out of 200. Soon afterwards riots erupt over allegations of vote-rigging by the PPP.
- 1 July – Friday is announced weekly holiday, replacing Sunday.
- 5 July – Pakistan's army led by General Zia ul-Haq stages a military coup and seizes power. Martial law is enforced and the Constitution suspended.
- 14 August – Pakistan celebrates 30 years of independence.
- 17 September – Zulfikar Ali Bhutto is arrested under martial law orders.
- 2 October – General Muhammad Zia ul-Haq bans all opposition; political activities are banned.

== Sports ==
=== Cricket ===
- 4 March – Colin Croft takes 8-29 against Pakistan at Port of Spain.
- 18 February – Test cricket debuts of Colin Croft and Joel Garner vs. Pakistan Bridgetown.
- 18 January – Imran Khan takes 12 wickets in a match for Pakistan win at the Sydney Cricket Ground.

== Births ==
- 1 March – Shahid Afridi, cricketer
- 5 June – Sayyed Aamir Ali, educationist, writer and columnist
- 4 December – Shahid Nazir, cricketer

== See also ==
- List of Pakistani films of 1977
