= 1972 in Pakistan =

- Decades: 1950s; 1960s; 1970s; 1980s; 1990s
- See also: History of Pakistan; List of years in Pakistan; Timeline of Pakistani history

Events from the year 1972 in Pakistan.

== Incumbents ==
=== Federal government ===
- President: Zulfikar Ali Bhutto
- Chief Justice: Hamoodur Rahman

=== Governors ===
- Governor of Balochistan:
  - until 11 April: Ghous Bakhsh Raisani
  - 11 April-19 April: Ghaus Bakhsh Bizenjo
  - 19 April-30 April: Ghous Bakhsh Raisani
  - starting 30 April: Ghaus Bakhsh Bizenjo
- Governor of Khyber Pakhtunkhwa: Hayat Sherpao (until 29 April); Arbab Sikandar Khan (starting 30 April)
- Governor of Punjab: Ghulam Mustafa Khar
- Governor of Sindh: Mumtaz Bhutto (until 20 April); Mir Rasool Bux Talpur (starting 29 April)

== Events ==
=== January ===
- January 8 – Government of Pakistan under Bhutto administration releases Sheikh Mujibur Rahman from the house arrest.
- January 20 – President Zulfikar Ali Bhutto publicly announces that Pakistan will immediately developed its own nuclear deterrence to prevent further intervention from India.
- January 25–30 - Pakistan temporarily withdraws from the Commonwealth of Nations in protest at the international recognition of Bangladesh as an independent Commonwealth republic (Pakistan returns to the Commonwealth in 1989).

=== June ===
- June 6 – Karachi labour unrest of 1972

=== July ===
- July 2 – India and Pakistan sign the Simla Accord in Simla, India, following the surrender of the Pakistan military to Indian forces in 1971 and the subsequent emergence of former East Pakistan as the independent country of Bangladesh.
- July 7 – Sindh Assembly passed the Sind Teaching, Promotion and Use of Sindhi Language Bill, 1972 which established Sindhi language as the sole official language of the province resulting in 1972 Language violence in Sindh.

=== August ===
- August 14 – Pakistan celebrates 25 years as an independent country without East Pakistan, Martial law ends.

== Births ==
- 26 April – Sana Nawaz, actress
- 5 August – Aaqib Javed, cricketer and coach
- 3 October – Aijaz Aslam, actor

== Deaths ==
- 28 May – Aziz ul Haq, Chairman of the Young People's Front, a Marxist group
- 29 May – Prithviraj Kapoor, actor and director
- 1 October – Riaz Shahid, film writer and director

== See also ==
- List of Pakistani films of 1972
