= 1961 in Pakistan =

- Decades: 1940s; 1950s; 1960s; 1970s; 1980s
- See also: History of Pakistan; List of years in Pakistan; Timeline of Pakistani history

Events from the year 1961 in Pakistan.

== Incumbents ==
- President: Ayub Khan
- Chief Justice: A.R. Cornelius

== Events ==
=== May ===
- 6 May – Constitution Commission, appointed by President Ayub Khan, presents its report, specifying pinpoints the failures of parliamentary government in Pakistan.

== Births ==
- 8 January – Shoaib Mohammad, cricketer.

== See also ==
- List of Pakistani films of 1961
