= 1962 in Pakistan =

- Decades: 1940s; 1950s; 1960s; 1970s; 1980s
- See also: History of Pakistan; List of years in Pakistan; Timeline of Pakistani history

Events from the year 1962 in Pakistan.

== Incumbents ==
- President: Ayub Khan
- Chief Justice: A.R. Cornelius

== Events ==
- March 1 – President Ayub Khan promulgates a constitution which sought to reinforce his authority in the absence of martial law.
- April – Elections for the National and provincial assembly were held on the basis of Basic Democracies.
- June 8 –A new constitution was promulgated by President Mohammad Ayub Khan. This also marks the end of the martial law period.
- July – the National Assembly passes the Political Parties Act, legalizing the formation of political parties.

== See also ==
- List of Pakistani films of 1962
