= 1965 in Pakistan =

- Decades: 1940s; 1950s; 1960s; 1970s; 1980s
- See also: History of Pakistan; List of years in Pakistan; Timeline of Pakistani history

Events from the year 1965 in Pakistan.

== Incumbents ==
=== Federal government ===
- President: Ayub Khan
- Chief Justice: A.R. Cornelius

== Events ==
=== January ===
- 2 January – Incumbent Ayub Khan defeats Fatima Jinnah in the 1965 Pakistani presidential election.

=== August ===
- 1 August – The inaugural issue of English-language weekly newspaper Holiday is published in Dacca.

=== September ===
- 6 September – Border disputes over Kashmir erupt into full-scale war as Indian forces attack near Lahore.
- 14 September – The Battle of Chawinda commences.
- 23 September – A ceasefire is implemented in the Indo-Pakistani war of 1965.

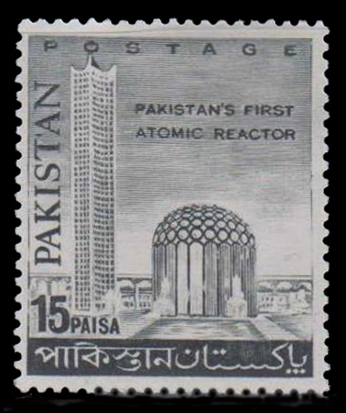
The United States supplied the nuclear research reactor through its "Atoms for Peace" program.

=== December ===
- 21 December – Pakistan's first nuclear research reactor, Pakistan Atomic Research Reactor-I, donated by the United States, reaches criticality.

== Births ==
=== April ===
- 3 April – Nazia Hassan, singer (d. 2000)
- 17 April – State of Bengal, British music producer (d. 2015)

=== May ===
- 5 May – Rana Shamshad Ahmad Khan, politician (d. 2015)

== Deaths ==
=== January ===
- 24 January – Ashraf Hussain, Bengali writer (b. 1892)

=== February ===
- 9 February – Khan Bahadur Ahsanullah, educationist, litterateur, Islamic theologian, and social reformer (b. 1873)

=== March ===
- 3 March – Hasan Shaheed Suhrawardy, Bengali diplomat, poet and art critic (b. 1890)

=== September ===
- 6 September – Sarfaraz Ahmed Rafiqui, military aviator of Pakistan (b. 1935)

== See also ==
- List of Pakistani films of 1965
