= 1960 in Pakistan =

- Decades: 1940s; 1950s; 1960s; 1970s; 1980s
- See also: History of Pakistan; List of years in Pakistan; Timeline of Pakistani history

Events from the year 1960 in Pakistan.

== Incumbents ==
=== Federal government ===
- President: Ayub Khan
- Chief Justice:
  - until 2 May: Muhammad Munir
  - 3–12 May: Muhammad Shahabuddin
  - starting 13 May: A.R. Cornelius

== Events ==
=== January ===
- 10 January – Warsak irrigation tunnel, excavation of which began in July 1957, is inaugurated.
- 27 January – Construction begins of the Baitul Mukarram mosque in Dacca, East Pakistan.

=== February ===
- 14 February – Chief Martial Law Administrator Field Marshal Muhammad Ayub Khan is confirmed as president through a limited referendum that he held to legitimize his rule. The 80,000 "basic democrats", village councilmen who had been elected locally, were called upon to vote "yes" or "no" on Ayub's continuance in office, and about 94% of them voted in the affirmative.
- 24 February – The cabinet decides on the name Islamabad for the new capital city to be built on the site of the villages of Saidpur and Nurpur.

=== March ===
- 1 March – PAF Shaheen School is established in Dacca by the Pakistan Air Force.

=== May ===
- 1 May – The U-2 Incident begins when an American U-2 spy plane, piloted by Francis Gary Powers, is shot down by Soviet Air Defence Forces. The clandestine flight had taken off from the U.S. base at Badaber near Peshawar, Pakistan.
- 5 May – The first generator of the Warsak hydroelectric power station is commissioned, producing 40,000 KW.
- 6 May – Dacca Residential Model School is inaugurated.

=== July ===
- 15 July – Huseyn Shaheed Suhrawardy, prime minister from 1956 to 1957, is found guilty by an Elective Bodies Disqualification Order tribunal of corruption, favoritism, and maladministration, and barred from political life for 6 years.
- 31 July – The foundation stone of the Mazar-e-Quaid is laid in Karachi.

=== August ===
- 1 August 1960 – No. 8 Squadron PAF is formed at PAF Station Mauripur, equipped with Martin B-57 Canberra bombers.

=== September ===
- 5 September – The inaugural issue of Bengali-language daily newspaper Dainik Azadi is published in Chittagong.
- 9 September – Pakistan defeats India 1–0 in field hockey at the 1960 Summer Olympics in Rome, winning the gold medal.
- 19 September – Pakistan and India sign the Indus Waters Treaty, brokered by the World Bank.
- 28 September – Foreign Minister Manzur Qadir alleges that Afghan irregulars crossed the border into the Bajaur District, initiating the Bajaur Campaign.

=== October ===
- 1 October – National Prize Bonds are introduced in the denomination of Rs. 10 each. They bear no interest, but are eligible for a prize of up to Rs. 20,000 in quarterly drawings starting six months after sale.
- 10 October – A severe cyclone hits Noakhali and Chittagong districts of East Pakistan, killing more than 5,000 people.
- 31 October – A cyclone more powerful than that which hit on 10 October sweeps across East Pakistan, killing 14,174 people.

=== December ===
- 5 December – A four-day conference on cholera begins in Dacca, during which the Pakistan-SEATO Cholera Research Laboratory is inaugurated.

== Births ==
=== January ===
- 1 January
  - Mia Mohammad Zainul Abedin, general (d. 2019)
  - Shakil Auj, Islamic scholar (d. 2014)
  - Khalid Mahmood Mithu, Bangladeshi film director and painter (d. 2016)

=== March ===
- 15 March – Shahidul Islam, Bangladeshi Islamic scholar and politician (d. 2023)

=== April ===
- 2 April – Mohamed Mijarul Quayes, Bangladeshi diplomat (d. 2017)

=== September ===
- 21 September – Sikandar Sanam, comedian and actor (d. 2012)
- 28 September – Sheikh Anne Rahman, Bangladeshi politician (d. 2022)

=== October ===
- 12 October – Happy Akhand, Bangladeshi singer-songwriter (d. 1987)
- 28 October – Aamer Wasim, cricketer (d. 2018)

=== December ===
- 28 December – Sajid Qureshi, politician (d. 2013)

== Deaths ==
=== May ===
- 12 May – Aly Khan, socialite and diplomat (b. 1911)

=== September ===
- 25 September – I. I. Chundrigar, prime minister (b. 1897)

== See also ==
- List of Pakistani films of 1960
