= 1968 in Pakistan =

- Decades: 1940s; 1950s; 1960s; 1970s; 1980s
- See also: History of Pakistan; List of years in Pakistan; Timeline of Pakistani history

Events from the year 1968 in Pakistan.

== Incumbents ==
=== Federal government ===
- President: Ayub Khan
- Chief Justice:
  - until 23 February: A.R. Cornelius
  - 1 March-3 June: S.A. Rahman
  - 4 June-17 November: Fazal Akbar
  - starting 17 November: Hamoodur Rahman

== Honours and awards ==
- Pakistan Hockey team led by Dr Tariq Aziz, won Gold at the Olympics in Men's Field Hockey

== Births ==
- September 1 – Shahbaz Ahmad, field hockey player

== Events ==
- 27 April – Ayub Khan inaugurated Kamalapur railway station in Dacca, East Pakistan (now Bangladesh).
- 7 November – start of 1968 movement in Pakistan

== See also ==
- List of Pakistani films of 1968
