= 1971 in Pakistan =

- Decades: 1950s; 1960s; 1970s; 1980s; 1990s
- See also: History of Pakistan; List of years in Pakistan; Timeline of Pakistani history

Events from the year 1971 in Pakistan.

== Incumbents ==
=== Federal government ===
- President: Yahya Khan (until 20 December), Zulfikar Ali Bhutto (starting 20 December)
- Prime Minister: Nurul Amin (starting 7 December and ending 20 December)
- Chief Justice: Hamoodur Rahman

=== Governors ===
- Governor of Balochistan: Riaz Hussain (until 25 December); Ghous Bakhsh Raisani (starting 25 December)
- Governor of East Pakistan: Syed Mohammad Ahsan (until 1 March); Sahabzada Yaqub Khan (until 7 March); Tikka Khan (until 3 September); Abdul Motaleb Malik (until 14 December); A. A. K. Niazi (until 16 December)
- Governor of Khyber Pakhtunkhwa: K.M. Azhar Khan (until 25 December); Hayat Sherpao (starting 25 December)
- Governor of Punjab: Attiqur Rahman (until 25 December); Ghulam Mustafa Khar (starting 25 December)
- Governor of Sindh: Rahman Gul (until 20 December); Mumtaz Bhutto (starting 20 December)

== Events ==
- 2 March – Start of the non-cooperation movement in East Pakistan.
- 23 March – All-Pakistan Awami League proposes Confederation of Pakistan.
- 25 March –
  - Widespread chaos and military crackdown in East Pakistan following the failure to recognize the elected majority party All-Pakistan Awami League.
  - Guerrillas (Mukti Bahini) start the Bangladesh Liberation War in East Pakistan.
- 26 March –
  - Sheikh Mujibur Rahman, the president of the All-Pakistan Awami League, is arrested by the Pakistan army.
  - President Yahya Khan banned political activities in Pakistan.
  - All-Pakistan Awami League is banned.
- 5 August – White Paper on the crisis in East Pakistan.
- 11 August – In-camera trial of Sheikh Mujibur Rahman starts for treason.
- 17 September – Formation of Malik ministry in East Pakistan.
- 19 September – Announcement of by-elections for empty seats in East Pakistan.
- 9 October – Ban on political activities lifted.
- 3 December –
  - Start of Indo-Pakistani war of 1971.
  - Pakistan launches Operation Chengiz Khan.
- 4 December –
  - In-camera trial of Sheikh Mujibur Rahman finishes.
  - PNS Ghazi is struck under the Indian Ocean.
- 6 December – Postponement of by-elections.
- 14 December – Resignation of the Malik ministry.
- 16 December – The Pakistan army surrenders to the joint India-Bangladesh command, Bangladesh becomes independent.
- 17 December – 1971 Pakistan Military Officer's Revolt starts.
- 20 December – Yahya Khan resigns and Zulfikar Ali Bhutto becomes new president.
- 27 December – Zulfikar Ali Bhutto proposes a Confederation between Bangladesh and Pakistan to Sheikh Mujibur Rahman.

== Births ==
- 2 January – Aamer Nazir, cricketer

== Deaths ==
- 27 March – Fazlul Bari, politician (b. 1922)
- 9 September – Ghulam Sarwar Hussaini, religious leader

== See also ==
- 1971 in Bangladesh
- List of Pakistani films of 1971
