= 1963 in Pakistan =

- Decades: 1940s; 1950s; 1960s; 1970s; 1980s
- See also: History of Pakistan; List of years in Pakistan; Timeline of Pakistani history

Events from the year 1963 in Pakistan.

== Incumbents ==
- President: Ayub Khan
- Chief Justice: A.R. Cornelius

== Events ==
=== March ===
- 2 March – The Sino-Pakistan Agreement is signed, resolving border disputes between the two countries in Kashmir.

=== April ===
- 3 April – Pakistan Shell Oil Company starts work on the Habiganj-I exploratory well.

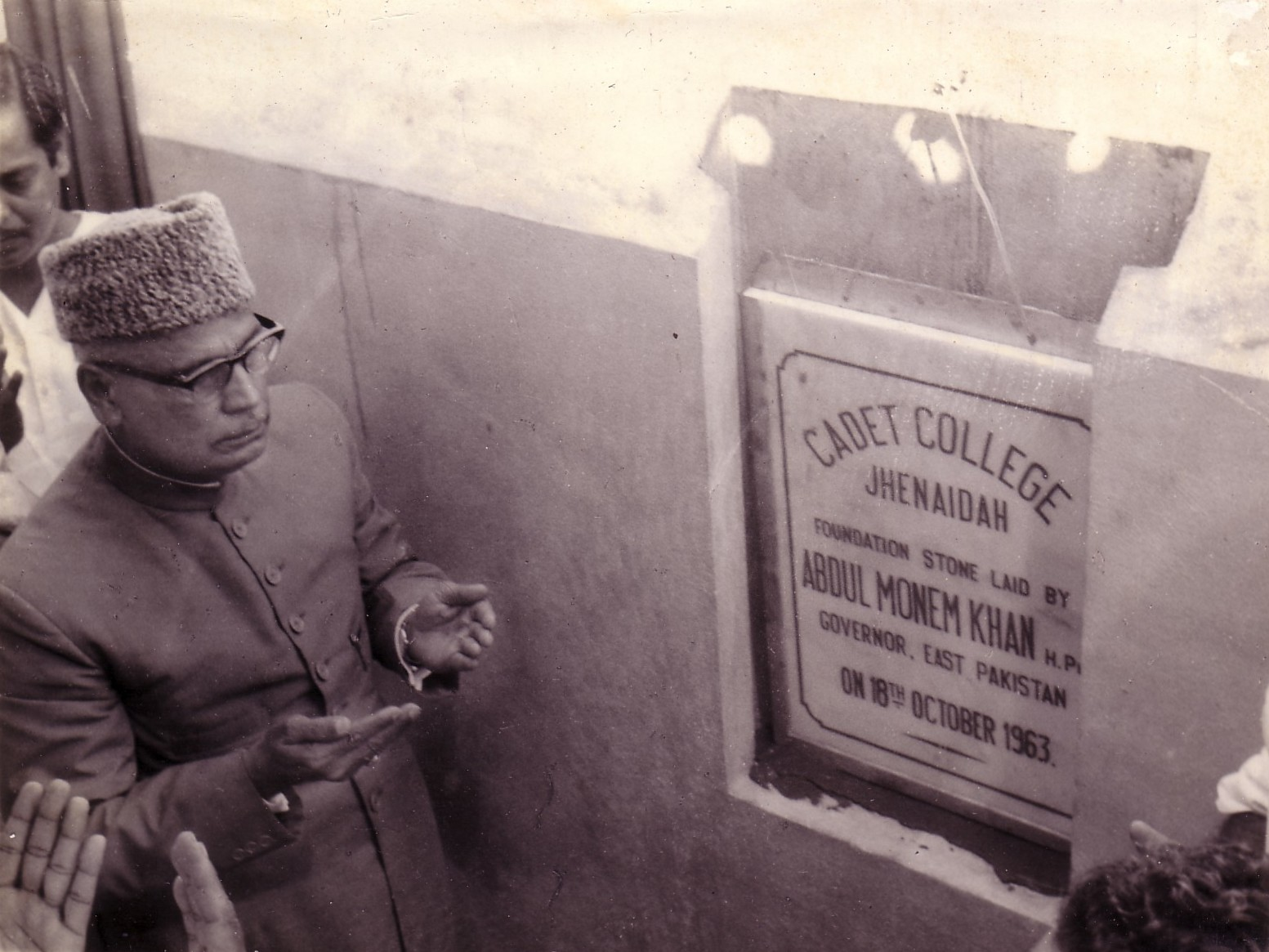
Abdul Monem Khan laying the foundation stone of Jhenaidah Cadet College

=== October ===
- 18 October – Governor of East Pakistan Abdul Monem Khan lays the foundation stone of Jhenaidah Cadet College.

== Births ==
=== May ===
- 23 May – Kanak Chanpa Chakma, painter

== Deaths ==
=== January ===
- 23 January – Mohammad Ali Bogra, Prime Minister of Pakistan (b. 1909)

=== August ===
- 19 August – Maulvi Tamizuddin Khan, politician (b. 1889)

=== December ===
- 24 December – Huseyn Shaheed Suhrawardy, Prime Minister of Pakistan (b. 1892)

== See also ==
- List of Pakistani films of 1963
