= 1969 in Pakistan =

- Decades: 1940s; 1950s; 1960s; 1970s; 1980s
- See also: History of Pakistan; List of years in Pakistan; Timeline of Pakistani history

Events from the year 1969 in Pakistan.

== Incumbents ==
=== Federal government ===
- President: Ayub Khan (until 25 March), Yahya Khan (starting 25 March)
- Chief Justice: Hamoodur Rahman

== Events ==
- 25 March 1969 – General Ayub Khan resigns and General Yahya Khan takes over.
- 1 November – 1969 Dhaka riots starts.

== Births ==
- March 6 – Tahir Zaman, field hockey player and coach.

== Deaths ==
- 4 March – Razzaqul Haider Chowdhury, politician (b. 1896)
- 31 October – Shamsuddin Ahmed, politician (b. 1889)

== See also ==
- List of Pakistani films of 1969
