= 1959 in Pakistan =

- Decades: 1940s; 1950s; 1960s; 1970s
- See also: History of Pakistan; List of years in Pakistan; Timeline of Pakistani history

Events from the year 1959 in Pakistan.

== Incumbents ==
=== Federal government ===
- President: Ayub Khan
- Chief Justice: Muhammad Munir

== Events ==
=== October ===
- 26 October, Ayub Khan announces his system of 80,000 Basic Democrats, who would further form the electoral college for the elections of the President and the members of the Central and Provisional Legislature.

=== December ===
- First step of elections to the Basic Democrat units in both parts of the country.

== See also ==
- List of Pakistani films of 1959
