= 1970 in Pakistan =

- Decades: 1950s; 1960s; 1970s; 1980s; 1990s
- See also: History of Pakistan; List of years in Pakistan; Timeline of Pakistani history

Events from the year 1970 in Pakistan.

== Incumbents ==
=== Federal government ===
- President: Yahya Khan
- Chief Justice: Hamoodur Rahman

=== Governors ===
- Governor of Balochistan: Riaz Hussain (starting 1 July)
- Governor of Khyber Pakhtunkhwa: K.M. Azhar Khan (starting 1 July)
- Governor of Punjab: Attiqur Rahman (starting 1 July)
- Governor of Sindh: Rahman Gul (starting 1 July)

== Events ==
=== August ===
- 6 August – A Pakistan International Airlines F27 enters a steep dive and crashes about three minutes after a night takeoff from Rawalpindi in poor weather. All four crew members and 26 passengers are killed.

=== November ===
- 12 November – East Pakistan: The Bhola cyclone devastates the region, resulting in extreme loss of life. The poor management in the aftermath of the cyclone is considered as one of the triggers of the Indo-Pakistani War of 1971.

=== December ===
- 7 December – 1970 Pakistani general election. Awami League gained majority and won the election.
- 30 December – A Pakistan International Airlines F27 crashes about 300 feet (91 meters) short of the Shamshernagar Airport runway. Seven of the 31 passengers are killed.

== Statistics ==
- The city of Faisalabad has an estimated population of 726,000, while the capital Islamabad has an estimated population of 70,000.

== See also ==
- List of Pakistani films of 1970
