= 1958 in Pakistan =

- Decades: 1940s; 1950s; 1960s; 1970s
- See also: History of Pakistan; List of years in Pakistan; Timeline of Pakistani history

Events from the year 1958 in Pakistan.

== Incumbents ==
=== Federal government ===
- President: Iskander Mirza (until October 27), Ayub Khan (starting October 27)
- Prime Minister: Feroz Khan Noon (until October 7), Ayub Khan (24 October-28 October)
- Chief Justice: Muhammad Munir

== Events ==
=== January ===
- January 2–8 – National Assembly sessions (6 sittings)
- January 20 – In the 2nd innings of test match that opened between Pakistan and West Indies on January 17, Haneef Muhammad has set new record by staying on the crease for 16 hr 10 min, and scoring 337 runs

=== February ===
- February 17-March 13 – National Assembly sessions (18 sittings)
- February – An Act passed by the Parliament for the permanent settlement of claims on agricultural lands.

=== March ===
- March – Hashim Khan has reclaimed the squash championship by winning the British Open

=== April ===
- April 29 – Washington D.C. A top secret meeting between Pakistani representatives (General Ayub Khan, Finance Minister Amjad Ali, Ambassador Mohammad Ali of Bogra) and American authorities. Amjad Ali offers excuse for PM (Noon)'s speech by saying that it resulted from harassment.
- April – Ataur Rahman Khan appointed CM of East Pakistan
- Jalal ud din Khan, Jalal Baba became Interior Minister.

=== May ===
- May 7 – Joseph Cordeiro was appointed the first Pakistani Archbishop of Karachi.
- May – Dr. Khan Sahib assassinated
- May 12 – Addressing the Planning Board Staff on the revamping of the Five Year Plan, the Prime Minister has stated that land reforms must not take place in West Pakistan where the power of the feudals must remain intact. "There has been a great deal of talk about such reforms," Noon said, "Most of the advocates of land reforms were city dwellers who had no knowledge of agriculture and not many of them knew what they were talking about."
- May – Pakistan bags 6 gold medals in Tokyo's Asian Games putting up a slightly better show than in 1954 when the country's tally included only four gold medals. Under Abdul Hameed Hameedi, the Hockey team has won the Asian Games title for the first time.

=== June ===
- June 9 – Gen Muhammad Ayub Khan's term as the Commander-in-Chief of the Pakistan Army extended by PM Feroz Khan Noon on request of President Mirza
- June – EP CM Rahman loses office to Abu Husain Sarkar
- June 23 – EP CM Abu Husain Sarkar loses office after a no-confidence motion in the East Pakistan Assembly, merely three days after his election by the same house
- June 25 – Presidential rule imposed in East Pakistan

=== July ===
- July 17 – Film journalist Ilyas Rasheedi has launched annual Nigar Awards for outstanding performance in various departments of filmmaking.

=== August ===
- August 25 – Parliamentary government restored in East Pakistan; Ataur Rahman again CM
- August – Law and order situation in Baluchistan was reported as unusual, as there is a widespread protest against the federal government over issues of regional autonomy

=== September ===
- September 5 – Press Commission appointed
- September 1–9 – National Assembly sessions (7 sittings)
- September 25 – Shahid Ali, Deputy Speaker EP Assembly, dies today. It is believed that the cause of death were the wounds suffered 2 days ago when disorder broke out inside the assembly.

=== October ===
- October 6 – The Khan of Kalat is dismissed from his fiefdom on sedition charges and arrested after exchange of fire between the Pakistan Army and the Khan's bodyguards. Some suspect a staged show instigated by President Iskander Mirza
- October 7 – Iskander Mirza abrogates the constitution and enforces martial law. General Ayub Khan is named Chief Martial Law Administrator (CMLA). Political parties are banned.
- October 8 – Gen Ayub Khan who took over the country as Chief Martial Law Administrator yesterday, today made his first broadcast from the radio station in Karachi (and is feared to have developed a dislike for its Director Z.A. Bukhari).

He has said in his first radio broadcast that the army has entered politics with reluctance. He warns the political leaders, smugglers, black-marketeers and disruptionists. Meanwhile, the Constitution has been declared null and void.

- October 27 – Ayub and his Cabinet takes oaths. In a dramatic turn of events late night, President Iskander Mirza resigned, giving over his office to Gen Ayub Khan, who had taken oath as Prime Minister just this morning. Ayub now becomes the country's 2nd President, though without a constitution. He remained Prime Minister for around 13 hours only, thus becoming the shortest-serving Premier in the history of the country so far. The press release declares it a voluntary transfer of power but, behind the curtains, the transfer letter had actually been wrung from the ambitious Mirza on gun point, by the 3 military members of Ayub's cabinet. General Ayub Khan, who was nominated Prime Minister by President Mirza on 24th, has taken the oath today. He has also announced his cabinet: three military officials including Lt General Azam Khan, and eight civilians including Md. Hafizur Rahman, A. K. Khan, Muhammad Ibrahim and Zulfikar Ali Bhutto.
- October 31 Land Reforms Commission appointed with Akhter Husain, Governor of West Pakistan as chairman

=== November ===
- November 19 – Maritime Commission appointed
- November 23 – law Reform Commission appointed
- November 27 – Exiled by the military regime, Iskander Mirza leaves for London

=== December ===
- December 2 – Administrative Re-organization Committee appointed
- December 8 – Gwadar, formerly a fief of the Sultan of Muscat and Oman, is handed over to Pakistan
- December 30 – Commission on National Education appointed
- December – Ayub Khan inaugurates the Korangi Colony outside Karachi for rehabilitation of the refugees from India

Last year's census shows that 51% of total output in large scale manufacturing is controlled by only 6% of the business houses in the country. This may be considered a result of the laissez-fair, private sector-led economy that the government has been encouraging since 1947. An unequal rate of growth between the two wings of the country seems to have been an important feature of economic development since the independence: only one-fifth of large-scale manufacturing is located in East Pakistan

In a spree of purging the society of unwanted elements, the army regime has shortlisted 1,661 allegedly corrupt officials

The military regime has arrested Ahmad Nadeem Qasmi, Sibt-e-Hasan and Faiz Ahmad Faiz, the editors of Lail-o-Nihar, Imroze and Pakistan Times respectively. All journals belong to Progressive Papers Ltd, whose major shareholder is Mian Iftikharuddin, the veteran leftist leader

== See also ==
- List of Pakistani films of 1958
