= List of Pakistani films of 1977 =

A list of films produced in Pakistan in 1977 (see 1977 in film) and in the Urdu language:

== Releases ==
=== January - March ===
| Opening | | Title | Director | Cast | Genre | Note | Ref. |
|---|---|---|---|---|---|---|---|
| M A R | 18 | Aina | Nazar-ul-Islam | Shabnam, Nadeem Baig | Romantic drama | | |

=== April – June ===
| Opening | | Title | Director | Cast | Genre | Note | Ref. |
|---|---|---|---|---|---|---|---|
| A P R | 13 | | | | | | |
| J U N | 23 | Begum Jaan | Hassan Tariq | Rani, Shahid, Aurnagzeb, Qavi Khan | | | |

=== July - September ===
| Opening | | Title | Director | Cast | Genre | Note | Ref. |
|---|---|---|---|---|---|---|---|
| J U L | 14 | Ishq Ishq | Sangeeta | Kaveeta, Ghulam Mohiuddin, Nadeem Baig, Sangeeta | Romantic drama | | |
| J U L | 28 | Sadqay Teri Mout Tun | Inayat Hussain Bhatti | Inayat Hussain Bhatti, Sultan Rahi, Neelo, Kaifee | | | |
| A U G | 4 | Sargent | Aslam Irani | Najma, Asif Khan, Mustafa Qureshi, Saiqa, Adeeb, Afzaal Ahmad | Action thriller | | |

=== October - December ===
| Opening | | Title | Director | Cast | Genre | Note | Ref. |
|---|---|---|---|---|---|---|---|
| N O V | 4 | Naya Suraj | | | | | |
| N O V | 22 | Aj Diyan Kurrian | Syed Kamal | Nisho, Neelo, Saiqa, Syed Kamal, Najma, Rangeela, Asha Posley, Nazar | Romance, Musical | A Golden Jubilee film of 1977. Super-hit music and film songs by Wajahat Attre and lyrics by Hazin Qadri | |

== See also ==
- 1977 in Pakistan
