= Anwar Bhinder =

Pakistani politician (died 2019)

Chaudhary Muhammad Anwar Bhinder was a Pakistani politician from Gujranwala, Punjab who has served as the Speaker of the West Pakistan Legislative Assembly from 12 June 1965 to 25 March 1969.

He also served as a member of the Senate of Pakistan for 16 years. Chaudhary Muhammad Anwar Bhinder hails from a renowned Bhinder family of Gujranwala. His father was Member of the Legislative Assembly before the independence of Pakistan. Bhinder was considered to be one of the top constitutional experts of Pakistan and has been part of the policy making.

His son, Khurshid Anwar Bhinder, served as a Justice of the Lahore High Court and Director General National Accountability Bureau. Nauman Ahmad Langrial and Alamdad Lalika is his relative.
