= List of Pakistani films of 1976 =

A list of films produced in Pakistan in 1976 (see 1976 in film) and in the Urdu language:

== 1976 ==
Title	Director	Cast	Genre	Notes
Chitra Tay Shera	Iqbal Kashmiri	Yousuf Khan, Aasia, Sultan Rahi, Ilyas Kashmiri, Adeeb	History film	
Andaata	Iqbac Yusuf	Muhammad Ali, Sultan Rahi, Sudheer, Mumtaz, Adeeb, Lehri	Drama	
Musafir	Javed Jabbar	Usmaan Peerzada, Zahoor Ahmad, Subhani Bayounous, Mariana Haq, Shamim Hilali, Raja Jameel, Pia Khan	Drama	Usmaan Peerzada's debut film as an actor.
Zaib-un-Nisa (film)				
Society Girl	Sangeeta	Sangeeta, Kaveeta, Ghulam Mohiuddin, Bahar Begum, Nisho, Qavi,	Drama	Syed Noor's first film as writer. Release date: April 16, 1976.
Jano Kapatti				
Aaj Aur Kal				
Surraya Bhopali		Rani	Drama	

== See also ==
- 1976 in Pakistan
