= Fazal-e-Maula =

Pakistani politician (born 1970)

Member of the Provincial Assembly of Khyber Pakhtunkhwa
- In office 18 July 2022 – 18 January 2023
- Preceded by: Waqar Ahmad Khan
- Constituency: PK-7 (Swat-VI)

Personal details
- Born: 4 November 1950 (age 75) Swat, Khyber Pakhtunkhwa, Pakistan
- Party: PTI-P (2023–present)
- Other political affiliations: ANP (2002–2022); JUI(F) (2022); PTI (2018-2023)

Fazal-e-Maula is a Pakistani politician who had been a member of the Provincial Assembly of Khyber Pakhtunkhwa from July 2022 till January 2023.

== Political career ==
He ran for a seat in the Provincial Assembly of the North-West Frontier Province as a candidate of the Jamiat Ulema-e-Islam (F) (JUI(F)) from PF-67 Swat-V in the 1997 North-West Frontier Province provincial election but was unsuccessful. He received 823 votes and was defeated by Qamus Khan, a candidate of the Pakistan Muslim League (N) (PML(N)).

He ran for a seat in the Provincial Assembly of Khyber Pakhtunkhwa as a candidate of the Pakistan Tehreek-e-Insaf (PTI) from PK-7 Swat-VI in an October 2018 by-election, but was unsuccessful. He received 13,663 votes and was defeated by Waqar Ahmad Khan, a candidate of the Awami National Party (ANP).

He was elected to the Provincial Assembly of Khyber Pakhtunkhwa as a candidate of the PTI from PK-7 Swat-VI in a 2022 by-election that was held due to the death of Waqar Ahmad Khan, the former MPA from this constituency. He received 17,395 votes and defeated the ANP's Hussain Ahmad, Waqar Ahmad Khan's uncle, who received 14,604 votes. He took the oath of office on 18 July 2022.
