= 1973 Pakistani presidential election =

- 10 August 1973

191 members of the Electoral College 96 votes needed to win
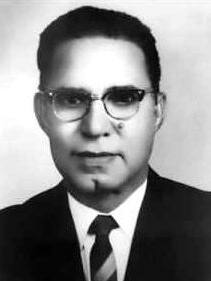

Candidate	Fazal Elahi Chaudhry	Khan Amirzadah Khan
Party	PPP	NAP(W)
Electoral vote	139	45
Percentage	75.54%	24.46%
President before election
Zulfikar Ali Bhutto
PPP
Elected President
Fazal Elahi Chaudhry
PPP

An indirect presidential election was held in Pakistan from 10 August 1973 to select the fifth president of Pakistan and the first president under the new 1973 constitution. Fazal Elahi Chaudhry, candidate for the Pakistan People's Party (PPP), won 139 votes in parliament, defeating Khan Amirzadah Khan, candidate for the National Awami Party (NAP), who won only 45 votes.

== Background ==
After the fall of the Ayub Khan regime in Pakistan through a popular uprising, President Yahya Khan declared martial law and subsequently held a general election which resulted in Sheikh Mujibur Rahman's All-Pakistan Awami League winning 167 seats, all from East Pakistan, to surpass the needed parliamentary majority of 151 seats to form a government. However, Zulfikar Ali Bhutto, chairman of the PPP, refused to recognize the electoral results because his party won the most seats in West Pakistan. As a result of this political crisis, Rahman declared the independence of a sovereign Bangladesh and won East Pakistan's independence by December 1971 with Indian support.

With the loss of East Pakistan, Khan handed over control of the presidency to Bhutto, who immediately began political reforms to draft a new constitution for Pakistan. Bhutto held a constitutional convention which resulted in the creation of a new constitution in October 1972, which was ratified by Pakistan's parliament on 10 April 1973. This new constitution transitioned Pakistan's system of government from a presidential system to a parliamentary system, and the president of Pakistan became a largely ceremonial role.

== Campaign ==
In preparation to place the new 1973 constitution into effect on 14 August 1973, Pakistan's bicameral parliament voted for a new president on 10 August. According to the constitution, the president is elected through an electoral college by both houses of parliament: the Senate and National Assembly; the president is also elected by votes in the country's provincial assemblies with a total of 696 votes needed to win.

The PPP nominated Fazal Elahi Chaudhry, a Punjabi politician from Kharian. Chaudhry was a Pakistan Movement activist, represented Pakistan at the United Nations, and served as the first speaker of the West Pakistan Legislative Assembly. Chaudhry also served as the Deputy Speaker of the National Assembly from 1965 to 1969 after joining Ayub Khan's Convention Muslim League during the 1965 presidential election. In 1970, Chaudhry joined the PPP and was elected as Speaker of the National Assembly in 1972.

The NAP, the largest opposition party during the Zulfikar Ali Bhutto era, nominated Khan Amirzadah Khan as its presidential candidate. Khan was a member of the Khudai Khidmatgar, a Pashtun non-violent movement that opposed the British Raj. Khan joined NAP after Pakistan's independence in 1947 and campaigned for the party from Mardan district. Khan staunchly opposed the Ayub Khan regime as one of the most influential NAP members and later fought a legal battle against Bhutto's government after the latter instigated a crackdown against the NAP, resulting in his release from prison.

== Results ==
After a six-hour joint session of the National Assembly and Senate, Chaudhry won a secure victory of 139 votes compared to Khan's 45 votes. Six members did not cast their vote, while one vote in favour of Chaudhry was declared invalid. Chaudhry was sworn in as president on 14 August 1973, Pakistan's independence day, following Zulfikar Ali Bhutto's swearing-in ceremony as prime minister. Chaudhry served as president until 1978, when he resigned due to his discontent with General Zia-ul-Haq, who seized power from the Bhutto government in 1977 through Operation Fairplay, a bloodless coup d'etat.
