= Marala =

Village in Punjab, Pakistan

Coordinates: 32°46′38″N 73°52′38″E

Marala, also known as Murala, is a village in Kharian Tehsil, Gujrat District of Punjab province, Pakistan. It is located at 32°46'38N 73°52'38E, at an altitude of 258 meters. The village is the birthplace of Fazal Ilahi Chaudhry, who served as the 5th President of Pakistan.

== Notable people ==
- Fazal Ilahi Chaudhry 5th President of Pakistan from 1973 until 1978

== See also ==
Marala Headworks
