= List of Pakistani films of 1974 =

A list of films produced in Pakistan in 1974 (see 1974 in film):

== 1974 ==
Title	Director	Cast	Genre	Notes
Bahisht	Hassan Tariq	Nisho, Nadeem, Nayyar Sultana, Talish, Saiqa	Romance film	Hit music by Rasheed Attre and A. Hameed. It was a super-hit movie of 1974.
Chaahat	Rehman	Shabnam, Rehman, Lehri, Qavi Khan, Mustafa Qureshi	Romance film	Hit music by Robin Ghosh and songs by playback singer Akhlaq Ahmed
Deedar	Hassan Tariq	Rani, Shahid, Waheed Murad, Talish, Sabiha Khanum	Romance film	Hit music by Nashad, songs by playback singer Mehdi Hassan
Dillagi	Aslam Dar	Shabnam, Nadeem, Lehri, Talish, Nayyar Sultana, Sultan Rahi, Rehan	Romance film	A Platinum Jubilee film of 1974 with hit music by Master Rafiq Ali
Do Tasweerain	Sibtain Fazli	Aasia, Nadeem, Rangeela, Shabnam	Drama	
Ishg Mera Naa	M. Akram	Aalia, Waheed Murad, Ilyas Kashmiri, Nazli, Iqbal Hassan	Romance film	A super-hit musical film of 1974 with music by Nazir Ali and film songs by Hazeen Qadri
Khatarnak (1974 film)				
Naukar Wohti Da				
Sagina				
Samaaj	Jaffer Bukhari	Nisho, Nadeem, Saiqa, Qavi Khan, Aslam Pervaiz, Meena Chaudhry and Ishrat Chaudhary	Romance film	Hit music by A. Hamid
Sidha Rasta		Naghma, Yousuf Khan, Sultan Rahi, Naeem Hashmi	Romance film	
Shama	Nazar Shabab	Muhammad Ali, Deeba, Waheed Murad, Nadeem, Babra Sharif, and Zeba		
Mitti Ke Putlay				
Usay Dekha Usay Chaha	Pervaiz Malik	Rozina, Waheed Murad, Sabiha, Lehri, Tamanna, Nirala, Niggo, Sentosh Rissal, Andleeb		Despite the excellent playback music by Sohail Rana, the film was a flop show of Waheed Murad and Parvaiz Malik

== See also ==
- 1974 in Pakistan
