= Aziz ul Haq (Pakistani activist) =

Pakistani communist activist

Aziz ul Haq (24 January 1939 – 28 May 1972), also called Dr. Azizul Haque or Aziz-ul Haque, was a Marxist–Leninist communist activist from Pakistan and one of the notable literary icons of Pak Tea House.

He was the Chairman of the Young People's Front, a left-wing political organisation. He was born to a modest revolutionary Sufi Muslim family, from the ancient Mian Mir area of Lahore, Pakistan. He obtained his PhD degree from the University of British Columbia in western Canada in 1966.

Before his death, Haq had started crusading against the Pakistan Peoples Party, once Zulfiqar Ali Bhutto came to power and began his allegedly authoritarian rule. He was killed in Lahore during Bhutto's premiership in Pakistan.
