= Operation Searchlight order of battle: Pakistan =

Pakistani military operation

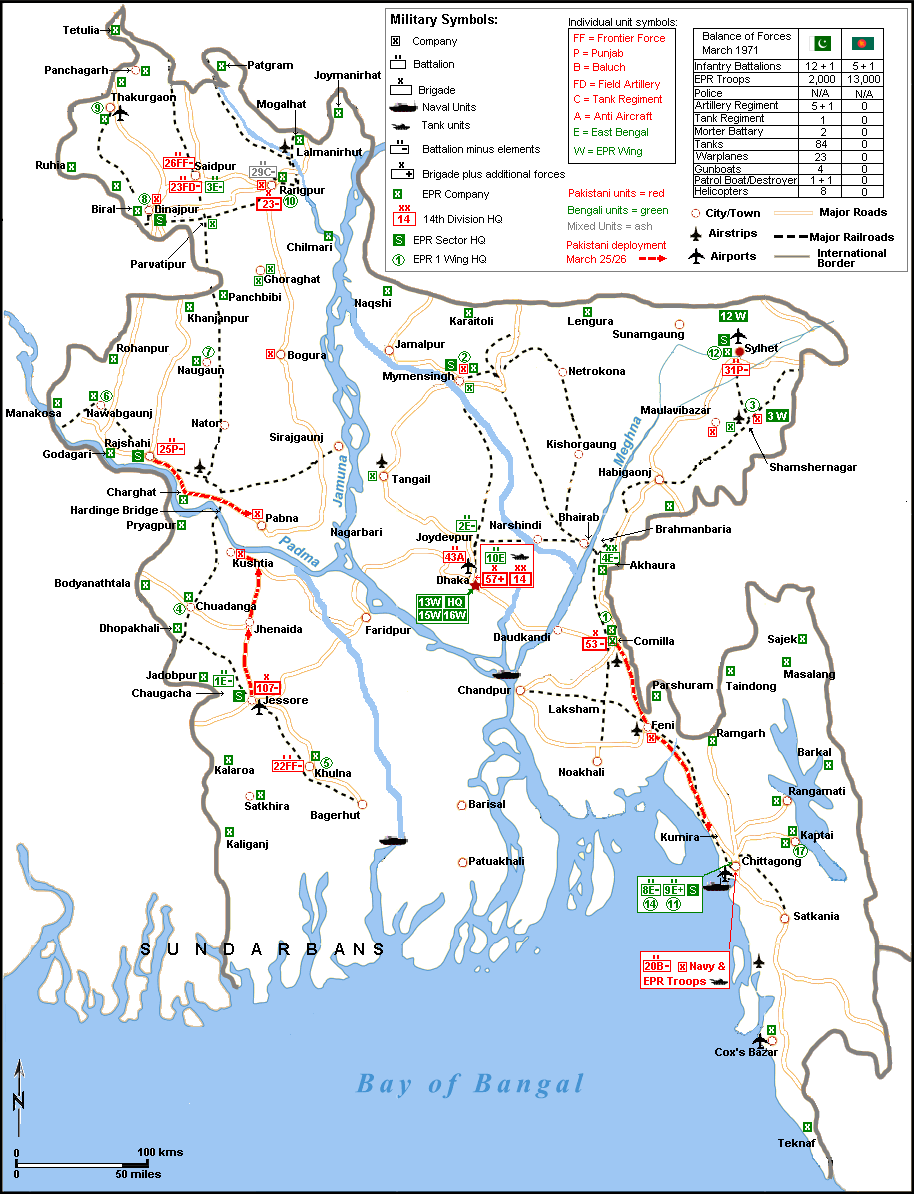
Operation Searchlight troop distribution

The Pakistani plan for a military action which commenced on 25 March 1971, in the then East Pakistan was code-named Operation Searchlight. This is the Operation Searchlight order of battle which was outlined on 19 March 1971, by Major General Khadim Hussain Raja, GOC 14th infantry division, and Major General Rao Farman Ali in the GHQ of Pakistan Army in Dhaka, (then) East Pakistan.

== Pakistani Forces ==
=== MLA Headquarters and Eastern Command in Dhaka ===
Lt. General Tikka Khan Governor and Chief Martial Law Administrator Major General Iftekhar Janjua – Advisor Major General Shawkat Riza – Advisor Brigadier Gulam Jilani – Chief of Staff MLA HQ Brigadier Nessar Ahmed – Director General EPR

- 14th Infantry Division:

Major General Khadim Hussain Raja – GOC 14th Infantry Division and OC East Pakistan Colonel Staff: Col. Saadullah G.S.O -1 (Operations): Lt. Col Taj Khan G.S.O -1 (Intelligence): Lt. Col Minwari

Attached Units:

  - 29th Cavalry - Lt.Col. Sagir Hussain Syeed (detached to Rangpur)
  - 43rd Light Ack Ack – Lt. Col. Shaffat Ali - Dhaka Airport
  - 19th Signal Regiment – Lt. Col. Iftekhar Hussain – Dhaka Cantonment
  - Company 3rd Commando Battalion – Lt. Col. Z.A. Khan
  - Army Aviation Squadron #4: 8 Helicopters (4 Mi-4 and 4 Alouette III)

Pakistan Air Force: CO: Air Commodore Inam Ul Haq Khan

  - 14th Squadron: 20 F-86 Sabres
  - 3 T-33 and 2 Helicopters
  - Temporary attachment: 4 C-130 Hercules planes and PIA Fokker Friendship Aircraft.

Pakistan Navy: Rear Admiral Sharif

- PNS Jessore (Gunboat) (detached to Khulna)
- PNS Comilla (Gunboat)
- PNS Sylhet (Gunboat)

==== Dhaka ====
Major General Rao Farman Ali: Officer Commanding Dhaka Area

- 57th Infantry Brigade: Brigadier General M. Jahanzeb Arbab
  - 22nd Baluch Regiment: Pilkhana Dhaka
  - 18th Punjab Regiment
  - 32nd Punjab Regiment – Lt. Col. Taj
  - 31st Field Artillery Regiment – Lt. Col. Zahed Hassan
  - 13th Frontier Force Regiment – Reserve and Cantonment Security

==== Comilla ====
- 53rd Infantry Brigade: Brig. Iqbal Shaffi
  - 31st Punjab – Lt. Col. Sarfraz Ahmed Khan and later Lt Col Riaz Hussain (stationed at Sylhet).
  - 20th Baluch – Lt. Col. SH Fatami (stationed at Chittagong).
  - 53rd Field Artillery – Lt. Col. Yakub Malik ( acting Garrison/Fortress Commander in absence of Brig Iqbal).
  - 3rd Commando Battalion – Lt. Col. Z.A. Khan. (Moved to Dacca for Operation Searchlight).
  - 171st Mortar Battery.
  - 40th Field Ambulance – Lt. Col. A.N.M Jahangir.
  - Brigade Intelligence Detachment

Chittagong Relief Column: (Brig. Iqbal Shaffi)

  - 24th Frontier Force – Lt. Col Shahpur Khan (after Shahpur fell in action, the command of only infantry battalion in the Column was taken over by Brigadier Iqbal himself).
  - 88th Mortar Battery.
  - Brigade Signals Detachment.
  - No Engineering Elements.

==== Chittagong ====
CO: Brig. Iqbal Shafi from April when HQ 53 Brigade was airlifted from Comilla, replaced by 107 Brigade (ex 9 Division) on arrival from West Pakistan.

Lt. Col. Abdul Aziz Sheikh: Sector Commander EPR;

Brig Mujamdar - Center Commadant EBR.

  - 20th Baluch – Lt. Col. SH Fatami
    - Company 31st Punjab

Pakistan Navy: Commodore A.R. Mumtaj - Chittagong Naval Base

  - PNS Jahangir (destroyer): Commander T.K Khan
  - PNS Rajshahi (Gunboat)
  - PNS Balaghat (Patrol boat)

==== Sylhet ====
- 31st Punjab – Lt. Col. Sarfraz Ahmed Khan.
    - Company in Shamshernagar
    - Company in Maulavibazar

=== Rangpur ===
- 23rd Infantry Brigade: Brig. Abdullah Khan Malik
  - 20th Field Ambulance – Lt. Col Masud
  - Brigade Signal & Engineers
  - 23rd Field Artillery – Lt. Col. Shaffi in Saidpur
  - 29th Cavalry – Lt. Col. Sagir Hussain Sayyed
  - 26th Frontier Force – Lt. Col. Hakeem A. Quereshi in Saidpur
  - 25th Punjab – Lt. Col. Shafkat Baluch (detached to Rajshahi)
    - 23rd Field Regiment Company in Bogra: Captain Mohammad Reza
    - 25th Punjab Company in Pabna: Captain Asghar
    - 26th Frontier Force Company in Dinajpur

=== Jessore ===
- 107th Infantry Brigade: Brig A. R. Durrani
  - 25th Baluch Regiment
  - 24th Field Artillery (elements)
  - 55th Field Artillery
  - 7th Field Ambulance
  - 22nd Frontier Force – Lt Col. Shamsi (detached to Khulna)
    - Company in Kushtia: Major Shoaib
