= Madar Bux =

Bengali politician (1907–1967)

Madar Bux (1907 – January 20, 1967) was a Bengali politician in East Pakistan. He was a member of the East Bengal Legislative Assembly from 1947 to 1954 for Rajshahi district.
