= Chittagong Press Club =

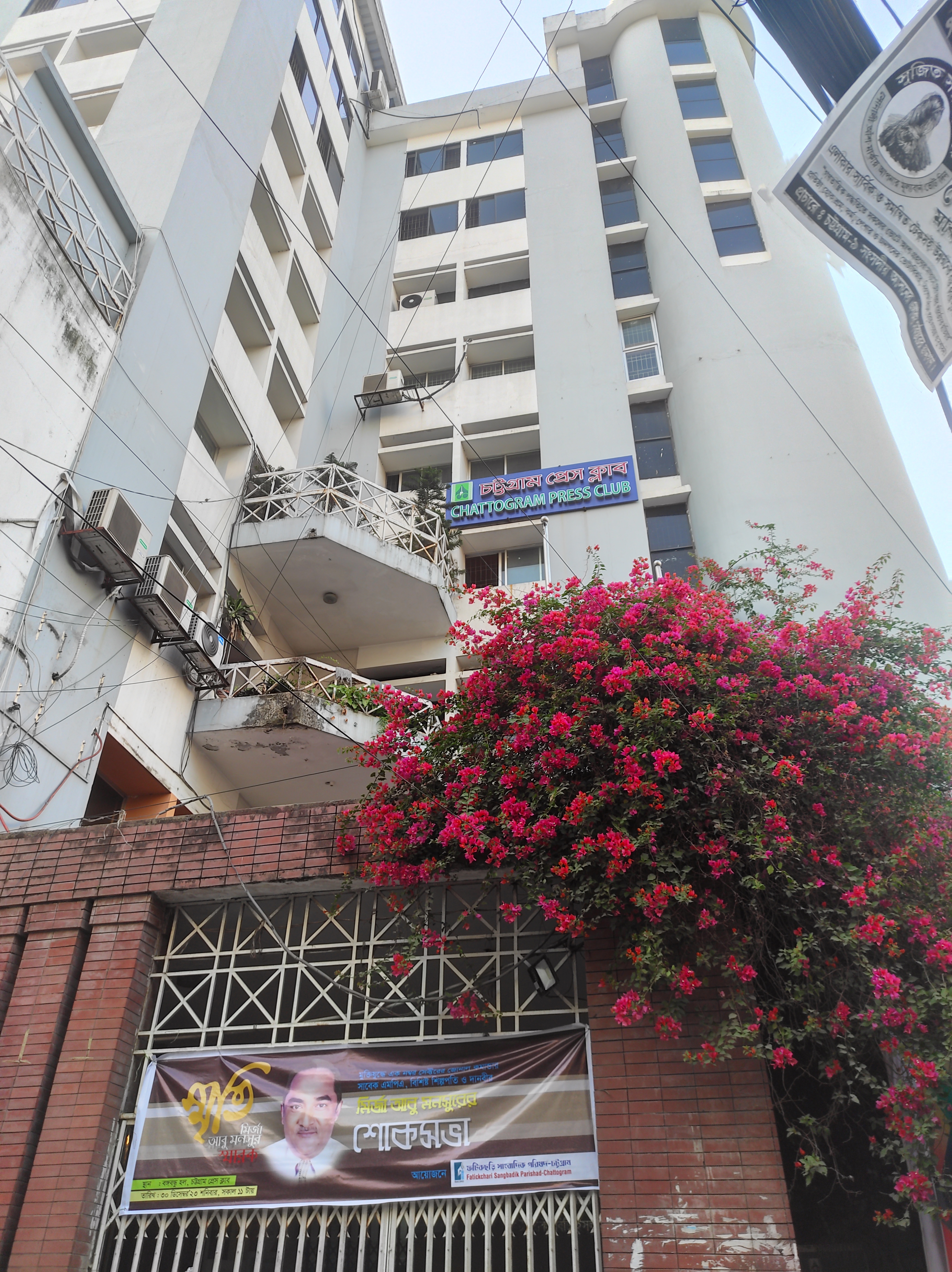
- Formation: 1972
- Headquarters: Dhaka, Bangladesh
- Region served: Bangladesh
- Official language: Bengali

Chittagong Press Club (Bengali: চট্টগ্রাম প্রেস ক্লাব) is a club and association of journalists based in Chittagong, the second largest city of Bangladesh. Ali Abbas and Chowdhury Farid are the President and General Secretary of the club, respectively.

== History ==
Chittagong Press Club was established in 1964 by the President of Pakistan, Field Marshal Ayub Khan. In January 2000, the press club and Chittagong Betar Bhaban (radio station) were bombed. The bombing was condemned by Abu Sayeed, State Minister for Information, who blamed the Bangladesh Nationalist Party led opposition.

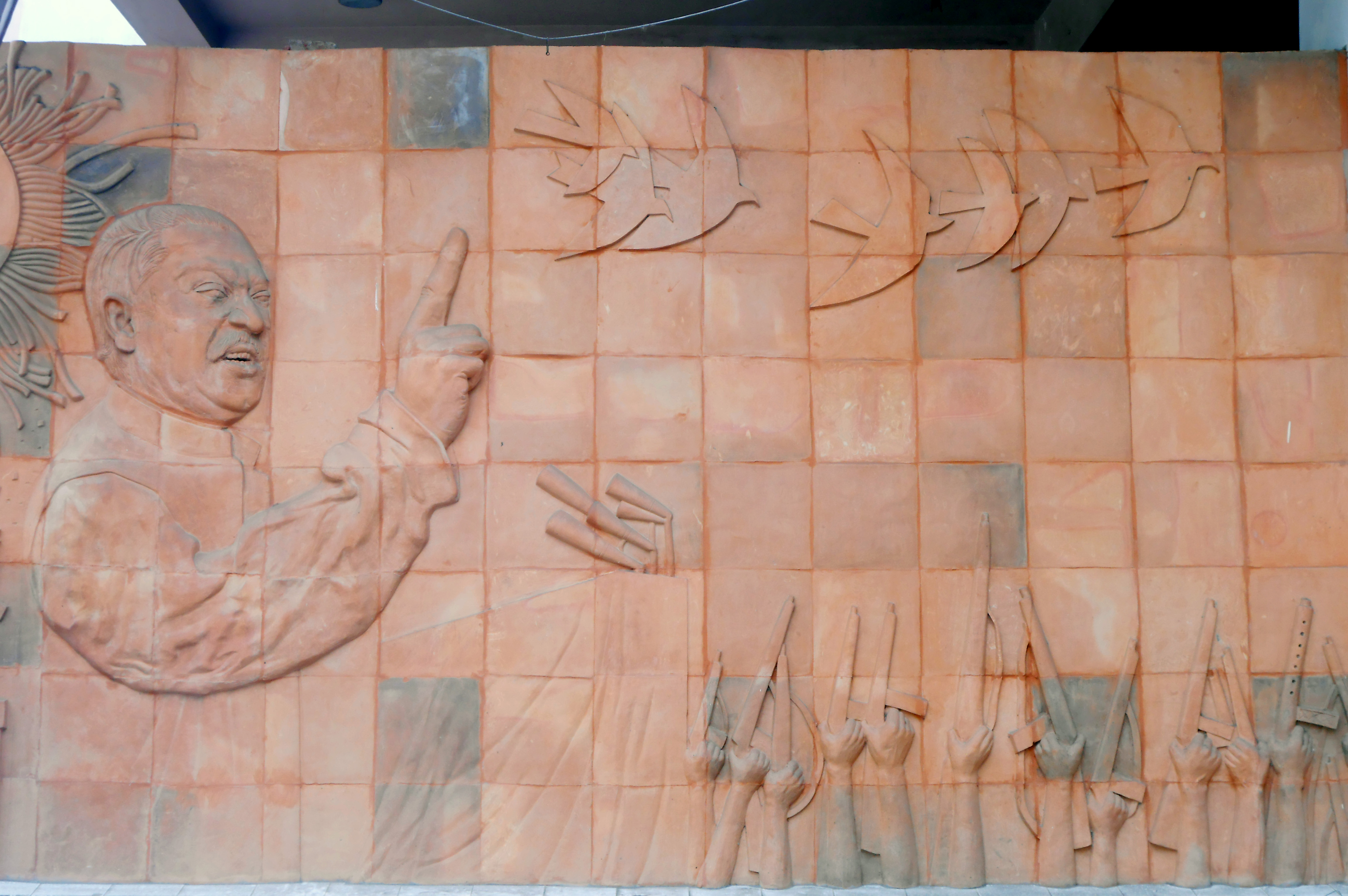
Terracotta work of Sheikh Mujibur Rahman at Chittagong Press Club

On 27 July 2008, the Pakistan embassy in Bangladesh donated equipment to the Chittagong Press Club (CPC) Institute of Technology.

On 27 March 2016, crude bombs were thrown at the Chittagong Press Club. The club was vandalized by youths from Hindu rights organization Oikkayabadda Sonatan Somaj in December. The organization was protesting attacks on Hindus in Brahmanbaria. Kazi Mostain Billah, deputy commissioner of Chittagong Metropolitan Police, said they were able to detain four young people from the club.

In March 2020, Chittagong Press Club started offering COVID-19 tests for its members. On 14 August 2024, the Press Club was attacked and vandalized in which 20 journalists were injured. The attack was led by Aminul Islam, an affiliate of the Bangladesh Nationalist Party politician Mir Mohammad Nashir Uddin, Sarwar Alam, health secretary of Chittagong City unit of the Bangladesh Nationalist Party, and Alamgir Noor, Bangladesh Jatiotabadi Jubo Dal activist. Chattogram Union of Journalists protested the attack and the attack on the home of Hossain Toufiq Iftekhar, editor of the Daily Chattogram.
