= Nasir Wasti =

Pakistani cricketer (1967–2006)

Cricket information
- Batting: Right-handed
- Bowling: Right-arm medium

Career statistics
Competition	First-class	List A
Matches	83	74
Runs scored	3,293	1,249
Batting average	26.55	21.91
100s/50s	3/22	0/5
Top score	134	76*
Balls bowled	637	1,078
Wickets	7	20
Bowling average	69.00	43.45
5 wickets in innings	0	0
10 wickets in match	0	0
Best bowling	2/33	4/25
Catches/stumpings	51/–	22/–
- Source: Cricinfo, 5 December 2022

Nasir Wasti (September 6, 1967 – July 21, 2006) was a Pakistani first-class cricketer who played for the Pakistan National Shipping Corporation (PNSC). He captained the club during his last two seasons.

Wasti died in 2006 when his car crashed into a trailer on the Super Highway in Karachi.
