= Haseeb-ul-Hasan =

Pakistani cricketer (1964–1990)

Personal information
- Full name: Haseeb-ul-Hasan
- Born: 11 May 1964; Karachi, Pakistan
- Died: 18 April 1990 (aged 25); Karachi, Pakistan
- Batting: Left-handed
- Bowling: Left-arm medium
- Role: All-rounder

Career statistics
Competition	First-class	List A
Matches	32	31
Runs scored	1,365	2,355
Batting average	31.02	13.82
100s/50s	1/9	0/0
Top score	104	24*
Balls bowled	3,473	1014
Wickets	59	23
Bowling average	31.50	33.52
5 wickets in innings	2	0
10 wickets in match	0	0
Best bowling	5/66	3/31
Catches/stumpings	22/–	7/–
- Source: ESPNcricinfo, 1 March 2008

Haseeb-ul-Hasan was a Pakistani first-class cricketer. He played domestic matches for team Karachi, Karachi Blues and Karachi Whites. Haseeb-ul-Hasan was born on 11 May 1964 in Karachi and died on 18 April 1990, when he was murdered by an unknown gunman.
