= Ghulam Murtaza Baloch =

Pakistani politician (1964–2020)

Member of the Provincial Assembly of Sindh
- In office September 2016 – 28 May 2018
- Constituency: PS-127 Karachi-XXXIX

Member of the Provincial Assembly of Sindh
- In office August 2018 – 2 June 2020

Provincial Minister of Sindh
- In office October 2018 – 2 June 2020

Personal details
- Born: 4 August 1964 Karachi, Sindh, Pakistan
- Died: 2 June 2020 (aged 55) Karachi, Sindh, Pakistan
- Party: Pakistan Peoples Party

Ghulam Murtaza Baloch (Urdu: غلام مرتضی بلوچ, 4 August 1964 – 2 June 2020) was a Pakistani politician who had been a Member of the Provincial Assembly of Sindh, from September 2016 to June 2020.

== Political career ==
He was elected to the Provincial Assembly of Sindh as a candidate of Pakistan Peoples Party (PPP) from Constituency PS-127 Karachi-XXXIX in by-polls held in September 2016.

He was re-elected to Provincial Assembly of Sindh as a candidate of PPP from Constituency PS-88 (Malir-II) in the 2018 Pakistani general election.

On 15 October 2018, he was inducted into the provincial Sindh cabinet of Chief Minister Syed Murad Ali Shah and was appointed Provincial Minister of Sindh for labour and human resources.

== Death ==
On 2 June 2020, he died due to COVID-19 during the COVID-19 pandemic in Pakistan. In May 2020, he had tested positive for SARS-CoV-2.
