= List of speakers of the West Pakistan Legislative Assembly =

The Speaker of the West Pakistan Legislative Assembly was the presiding officer of that legislature during the One Unit Scheme.

Name	Period
Fazal Ilahi Chaudhry	May 20, 1956 – October 7, 1958
Mubin-ul-Haq Siddiqui	June 12, 1962 – July 4, 1963
Anwar Bhinder	July 16, 1963 – March 25, 1969

== Sources ==
- Former Speakers
