= Waqar Ahmad Khan =

Pakistani politician (1967–2022)

Member of the Provincial Assembly of Khyber Pakhtunkhwa
- In office 24 October 2018 – 30 April 2022
- Succeeded by: Fazal-e-Maula
- Constituency: PK-7 Swat-VI

Personal details
- Born: October 15, 1967
- Died: April 30, 2022 (aged 54)
- Party: Awami National Party

Waqar Ahmad Khan (born 15 October 1967 – 30 April 2022) was a Pakistani politician and member of the Provincial Assembly of Khyber Pakhtunkhwa. Khan belonged to the Awami National Party. He died on 30 April 2022.

== See also ==
- Politics of Pakistan
