= Shahed Chowdhury =

Bangladeshi film director (1966–2019)

- Born: 2 March 1966
- Died: 17 March 2019 (aged 53)
- Occupation: Film director

Shahed Chowdhury (2 March 1966 – 17 March 2019) was a Bangladeshi film director. He directed many Dhallywood movies.

== Biography ==
Chowdhury was born on 2 March 1966 in the village of Koya of Kumarkhali Upazila of Kushtia District. His debut direction was Khol Nayika which was released in 2002. This film is selected for preservation in Bangladesh Film Archive. He also directed films like Tough Operation and Tension. These films are also selected for preservation in Bangladesh Film Archive. Aral was his last direction. This film was released in 2016.

Chowdhury died on 17 March 2019 at the age of 53.

== Selected filmography ==
- Khol Nayika
- Tough Operation
- High Risk
- Tension
- Valo Hote Chai
- Aral
