= Muhammad Yaqub Ali =

Chief Justice of Pakistan

Muhammad Yaqub Ali محمد یعقوب علی

8th Chief Justice of Pakistan
- In office 1 November 1975 – 22 September 1977
- Appointed by: Fazal Ilahi Chaudhry
- Preceded by: Hamoodur Rahman
- Succeeded by: Sheikh Anwarul Haq

Personal details
- Born: March 1912 Jalandhar, British India (now India)
- Died: 5 August 1994 (Aged 82) Lahore, Punjab, Pakistan
- Education: Islamia College (Lahore); University of the Punjab

Mohammed Yaqub Ali (Urdu, محمد یعقوب علی) (March 1912 – 5 August 1994) was a Pakistani judge who served as the Chief Justice of Pakistan from 1975 to 1977.

== Early life and education ==
Muhammad Yaqub Ali was born in March 1912 at Jalandhar, where he received his early education. He did his graduation from Islamia College (Lahore) and Law from University of Punjab in 1936. He remained active in the Pakistan Movement and was Chairman of the Julundar Chapter of the All India Muslim League.

== Career ==
In 1948, he started practicing at Lahore High Court. He was promoted to the High Court Bench in 1955 and in 1965 was elevated to the Supreme Court Bench. Justice Yaqub Ali was appointed the Chairman of the Karachi Airport Enquiry Commission in 1969 and in 1971 the Chairman of Special Court for Ganga Hijacking Case. In 1975, he led the Pakistan Delegation to the 7th World Peace Conference held at Washington, D.C.

Justice Mohammed Yaqub assumed the office of Chief Justice of Pakistan on 1 November 1975. In 1976, he led the Pakistani Delegation to the United Nations third Law of Sea Conference held at New York City. In 1976 prime minister Zulfikar Bhutto passed a constitutional amendment, the Sixth Amendment, which permitted Yaqub to stay as chief justice beyond his superannuation age. In 1977, he was appointed as the Chairman of Indus Water Commission. He was a great believer in democracy which is why he was forced to retire by the military dictator Muhammad Zia-ul-Haq on 22 July 1977.

Justice Yaqub Ali had held a previous martial law by a usurping general violating the constitution of Pakistan as martial law undermines the concept of the rule of law which is the basis for the country's constitution. The usurping General Zia realized his illegal actions would be overturned in a court of law headed by a Judge who believed in democracy so he proposed amendments to force the Chief Justice of the Supreme Court Muhammad Yaqub Ali to retire.

After retirement Justice Yaqub Ali became a social worker in the field of education to make sure he continued to serve his country.

== See also ==
- Chief Justices of Pakistan
- Supreme Court of Pakistan
- List of Pakistanis

Legal offices
Preceded by Hamoodur Rahman	Chief Justice of Pakistan; 1975–1977	Succeeded by Sheikh Anwarul Haq
