= Mir Rasool Bux Talpur =

Pakistani politician

Mir Rasool Buksh Talpur

9th Governor of Sindh
- In office 29 April 1972 – 14 February 1973
- President: Zulfiqar Ali Bhutto
- Prime Minister: Abolished until 14 August 1973
- Preceded by: Sheila Irene Pant

Personal details
- Born: 13 October 1920 Hyderabad, Sindh
- Died: 1 May 1982 (aged 61) Sindh
- Spouse: Sakina Talpur (m. 1948)

Mir Rasool Bux Talpur (13 October 1920 – 1 May 1982) was a Pakistani politician and officeholder. On November 3, 1975, Mir Rasool Bakhsh Khan formed his own party, the National Democratic Movement. Mir Sahib was appointed as the senior minister of Sindh province on May 14, 1981 in the Zia era, during which he died on May 1, 1982.

== Governor of Sindh ==
He served as Governor of Sindh from 29 April 1972 to 14 February 1973. He was a descendant of a non-royal family of the clan of Talpurs, and may be recognized in contrast with those who reigned Sindh in the past.
