= Ra'ana Liaquat Ali Khan =

Pakistani politician and economist (1905–1990)

Madar-e-Pakistan Begum Ra'ana Liaquat Ali Khan NI OMRI
- بیگم رعنا لياقت على خان
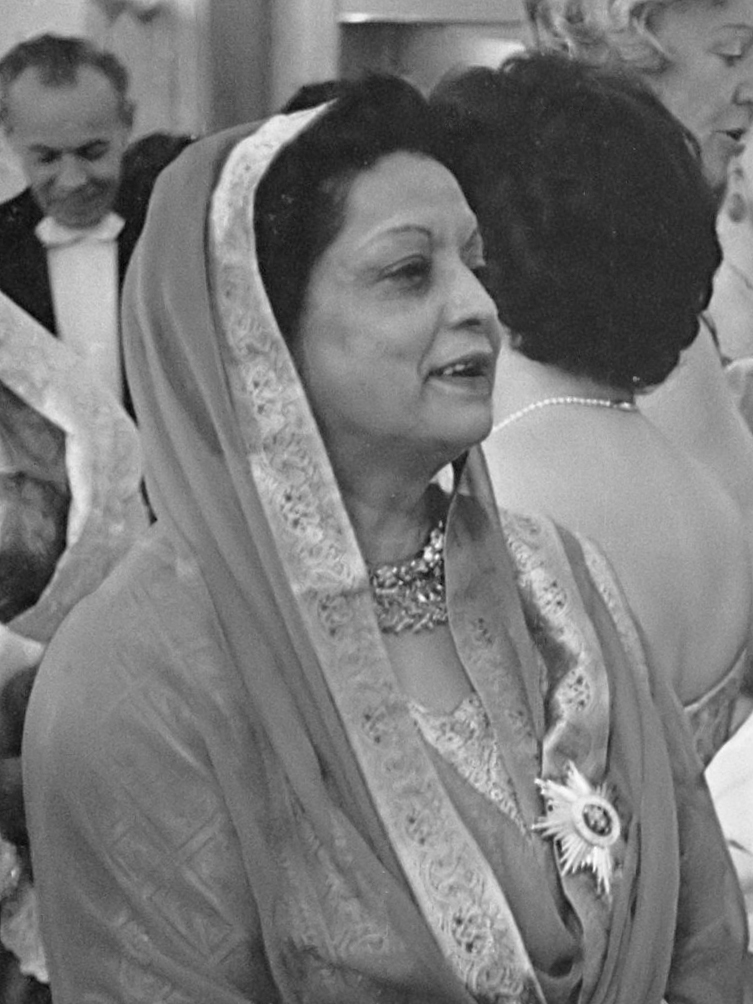
- Ra'ana in 1961

10th Governor of Sindh
- In office 15 February 1973 – 28 February 1976
- President: Fazal Ilahi Chaudhry
- Preceded by: Mir Rasool Bux Talpur
- Succeeded by: Muhammad Dilawar Khanji

Spouse of the Prime Minister of Pakistan
- In office 14 August 1947 – 16 October 1951
- Prime Minister: Liaquat Ali Khan
- Preceded by: Order established
- Succeeded by: Shahbano Ashraf

President of All Pakistan Women's Association
- In office 14 August 1949 – 29 October 1951

Pakistan Ambassador to the Netherlands
- In office 1954–1961

Pakistan Ambassador to Italy and Tunisia
- In office 1965–1966

Personal details
- Born: Sheila Irene Pant; 13 February 1905 Almora, Agra and Oudh, British India
- Died: 13 June 1990 (aged 85) Karachi, Sindh, Pakistan
- Citizenship: British Indian (1905–1947); Pakistani (1947–1990)
- Party: Muslim League
- Spouse: Liaquat Ali Khan (m. 1932; d. 1951)
- Education: Master in Science (MSc)
- Alma mater: University of Lucknow
- Occupation: Stateswoman
- Awards: Nishan-e-Imtiaz; Order of Merit of the Italian Republic; Order of Orange-Nassau

Military service
- Allegiance: Pakistan
- Branch/service: Pakistan Army
- Years of service: 1947–1951
- Rank: Brigadier (honorary rank)
- Unit: Pakistan Army Medical Corps
- Commands: Naval Women's Reserve Corps; Women's National Guard; Pakistan Army Medical Corps
- Battles/wars: Indo-Pakistani War of 1947

Begum Ra'ana Liaqat Ali Khan (Urdu: رعنا لياقت على خان, known as Gul-i-Rana; 13 February 1905 – 13 June 1990) was a Pakistani public figure who served as the First Lady of Pakistan from 1947 to 1951 as the wife of Liaquat Ali Khan who was the 1st Prime Minister of Pakistan. She was also the first female governor in Pakistan, serving Sindh. She was one of the leading woman figures in the Pakistan Movement, and a career economist, and prominent stateswoman from the start of the cold war till the fall and the end of the Cold War.

She was one of the leading women politicians and nationwide respected female personalities witnessed key major events in Pakistan. She was one of the leading and pioneering women figures in the Pakistan Movement and served as the executive member of Pakistan Movement committee working under Muhammad Ali Jinnah. She also served as economic adviser to Jinnah's Pakistan Movement Committee and later became First Lady of Pakistan when her husband Liaqat Khan Ali became Pakistan's first prime minister. Rana Liaqat Ali khan as First Lady of Pakistan, she launched programs for woman's development in the newly founded country. Later, she would start her career as a stateswoman that would last a decade.

In the 1970s, she joined hands with Zulfikar Ali Bhutto's political movement and joined the socialist government of Zulfikar Ali Bhutto, elected prime minister at that time. She was one of the most trusted and close government and economical advisers to Bhutto and his government, and had played influential role and involved with many key economical decisions taken by Zulfikar Ali Bhutto. Zulfikar Ali Bhutto led the appointment of Ra'ana as the Governor of Sindh Province, and she took the oath on 15 February 1973. Ra'ana was the first woman Governor of Sindh as well as first Chancellor of University of Karachi. In 1977, Ra'ana along with Bhutto and his party, and won the parliamentary elections of 1977, but did not take the gubernatorial office due to martial law imposed by General Zia-ul-Haq, Chief of Army Staff of Pakistan Army. Ra'ana went on to work and dedicated her life for the social and economic benefit of women of Pakistan till her death in 1990. She died in 1990 due to cardiac arrest and was buried in Karachi, with full state and military honours given to her in her funeral. Because of her services and efforts for medical and woman development and woman empowerment, Ra'ana is commonly known as "Māder-e-Pakistan" (English translation: Mother of Pakistan).

== Biography ==
=== Early life and education ===
Sheila Irene Pant was born in Almora, Kumaon in 1905 in a Kumaoni family that had converted to Christianity in 1869. She attended the University of Lucknow, where in 1927 she was awarded a BA degree in economics and a Bachelor of Theology in religious studies. In 1929, she obtained a double MSc in economics and sociology. She began her career as a teacher in the Gokhale Memorial School after completing the Teachers Diploma Course from the Diocesan College, Calcutta. She was appointed as professor of economics at Indraprastha College, Delhi, in 1931 and met Liaqat Ali Khan in the same year when he visited to deliver a lecture on law. The couple married in 1932. At this time, she converted to Islam and took the name Begum Ra'ana (Gul-i-Rana) Liaqat Ali Khan. After the reorganisation of the Muslim League, Begum Ra'ana devoted herself to the task of creating political consciousness amongst the Muslim women society of the British Indian Empire. During this time, Ra'ana became an executive member of Jinnah's Working Committee and served there as economical adviser. Her struggle for emancipation and support for Pakistan continued till the creation of Pakistan for Muslims of India in 1947.

== Pakistan Movement ==
With her husband, Ra'ana strongly opposed the Simon Commission. While a professor of economics, Ra'ana intensely mobilised students from her college. In 1942, when it became apparent that Imperial Japan was near attacking India, Jinnah summoned Ra'ana and said to her "Be prepared to train the women. Islam doesn't want women to be shut up and never see fresh air". To undertake this task, Ra'ana organised Muslim women in the same year, when she formed a small volunteer medical corps for nursing and first aid in Delhi. Begum Ra'ana played an important role in creating political awareness among women. Ra'ana was among the aspiring women in South Asia and encouraged hundreds of women to fight for Pakistan shoulder-to-shoulder with men.

== First Lady ==
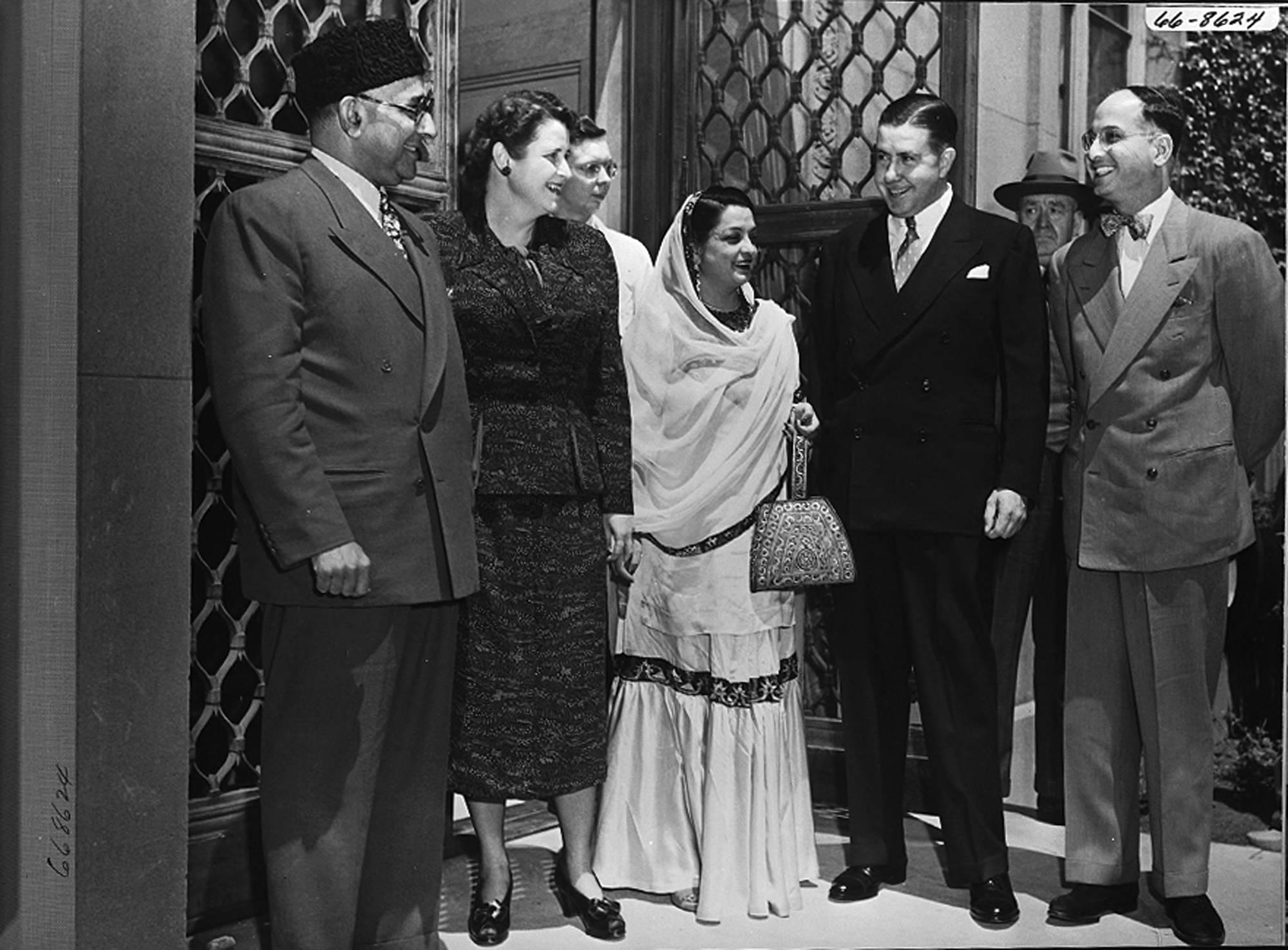
Begum Liaquat Ali Meets President of MIT in 1950, her husband on the far left

Ra'ana was the first First Lady of Pakistan. As First Lady, she initiated reforms for woman and child development and social progress of women, and played a major role for women's part in Pakistan's politics. After the assassination of her husband Liaquat Ali Khan in 1951, Begum Ra'ana continued her services for the social and economic benefit of women of Pakistan till her death in 1990. One of the daunting challenges for her was to organise health services for women and children migrating from India to Pakistan.

=== Initiatives for women ===
Ra'ana founded the Women's National Guard (PWNG), and helped established the Women's Naval Reserves in the Navy, and was appointed as the Chief Controller. For her immense services to the military as a civilian, the Pakistan Army notably appointed her as the first woman Brigadier, and an honorary uniform was issued especially for her. The Pakistan Woman National Guard was intended to fight for women's rights and aimed to prevent brutal treatment of women, either received from their spouses or caused by domestic violence. At first, the organisation was successful and took strong initiatives in West-Pakistan to lower the rate of violence against women, as she was the organisation's president. But after her husband's death, Ra'ana left Pakistan as she was appointed Pakistan's Ambassador to the Netherlands. Following her departure, the Pakistan Women National Guard was soon disbanded due to financial distress and the government's apathy. However, the Pakistan Woman Naval Reserves still continues as of today where many women joined the Navy through this program. The program has lasting effects in Pakistan's Armed Forces, and the Army and Air Force later established a Woman Reserves program as part of her vision.

=== Establishment of APWA ===
In 1949, Begum Ra'ana arranged a conference of over 100 active women from all over Pakistan. The conference announced the formation of a voluntary and non-political organisation for the social, educational and cultural uplift of the women, named All Pakistan Women's Association (APWA). She was nominated as its first president and unlike Pakistan Women National Guard, the APWA continued to grow as it continuously fought for women's rights in Pakistan. For its services, the Government of Pakistan established APWA College in Lahore as part of its struggle.

== Career as stateswoman ==
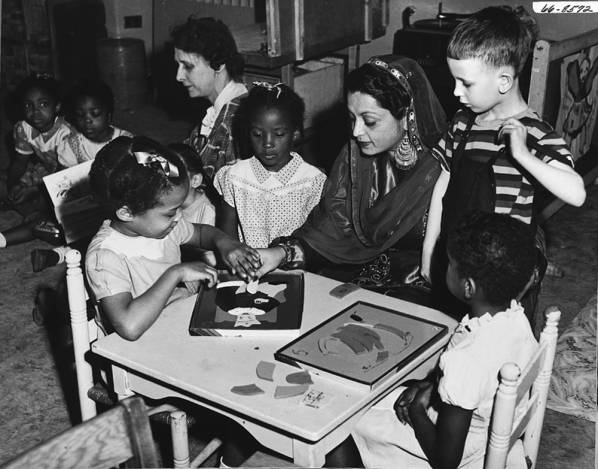
Begum Liaquat Ali Khan touring New York's Children's Centre

After her husband's death, Ra'ana went on to start her career as a stateswoman that lasted more than 2 decades. In 1952, Ra'ana was the first Muslim woman delegate to the United Nations. In 1954, the Government of Pakistan had appointed her as Pakistan's Ambassador to the Netherlands, and also was the first woman ambassador of Pakistan. She represented Pakistan in the Netherlands until 1961 and was also the doyen of the Diplomatic Corps. In June 1966, she was appointed as Pakistan's Ambassador to Italy and stayed there until 1965. Later, she was directed to Tunisia as Pakistan's Ambassador to Tunisia and held this position until March 1966. Following her return to Pakistan, Ra'ana joined Rana Liaquat Ali Khan Government College of Home Economics as Professor of Economics and stayed there until 1973. The Government College University awarded her an honorary doctorate in economics and conferred her with a Doctor of Philosophy in Economics in 1967.

=== Bhutto's companion ===
In 1972, as Pakistan was dismembered and going through an intense crisis, Ra'ana joined hands with then-President Zulfikar Ali Bhutto and his political movement, and joined the socialist government of Zulfikar Ali Bhutto. Ra'ana was part of Bhutto's Ministry of Finance and Economics and played a major and influential role in decisions being made concerning economics. Bhutto encouraged her to participate in upcoming elections, and won elections of 1973. Bhutto did not waste time to appoint Ra'ana as Governor of Sindh Province. Ra'ana then became the first woman governor in Pakistan. She was also the first Chancellor of Sindh University and Karachi University. She continued her term until 1976 when new elections were held. Ra'ana again contested in the 1977 parliamentary elections but did not take the gubernatorial office due to martial law imposed by General Zia-ul-Haq, Chief of Army Staff of the Pakistan Army. She was one of the personalities that argued against the martial law and against the execution of Bhutto. On the day when Bhutto was executed, Ra'ana was reported to be disheartened and emotionally distressed and cried over Bhutto's death for more than three days constantly. Ra'ana launched an anti-Zia campaign and fought against the military government of General Zia-ul-Haq.

== Death ==
Liaquat died on 13 June 1990.

== Honors and legacy ==
Ra'ana is considered one of the greatest female leaders Pakistan has produced. In Pakistan, she is given the title of "Mother of Pakistan", received in 1950. Ra'ana continues to be seen as a symbol of selfless service to the cause of humanity and uplift of women.

- United Nations' Human Rights Award (1978)
- honorary doctorate in economics (1967)
- Knight Grand Cross of the Order of Merit of the Italian Republic (1 March 1966)
- Woman of the World, Turkish Women's Association (1965)
- Grand Cross of Orange Nassau (1961)
- Nishan-i-Imtiaz (1951)
- Mother of Pakistan in 1950
- Jane Addams Medal in 1950
- Woman of Achievement Medal 1950

=== Eponymous ===
- Ra'ana Liaquat Ali Khan, Government College of Home Economics (RLAK CHE), Karachi – The economics research institutes of the Government College University established in the 1960s in her honour.
- Raana Liaquat Model Colony – a settlement in Karachi named after Ra'ana Liaqat Ali Khan.

== Awards and honours ==
- Government of Pakistan honoured her with the highest military honour Nishan-e-Imtiaz.
- Queen Juliana of the Netherlands conferred on her the Grand Cross of Orange–Nassau.
- Recipient of the International Gimbel Award for service to humanity (1962).
- United Nations Prize in the Field of Human Rights for her outstanding contribution to the promotion and protection of the human rights embodied in the Universal Declaration of Human Rights and in other United Nations human rights instruments (1978).

Political offices
Preceded by Mir Rasool Bux Talpur	Governor of Sindh; 15 February 1973 – 28 February 1976	Succeeded by Muhammad Dilawar Khanji
