= Fazal Elahi Chaudhry =

President of Pakistan from 1973 to 1978

Honorable Fazal Elahi Chaudhry
- فضل الٰہی چودھری
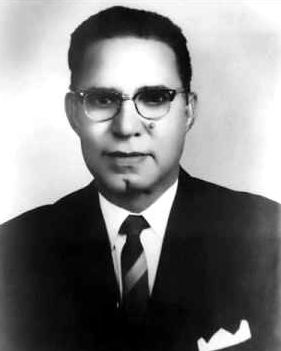
- Official portrait, c. 1973

5th President of Pakistan
- In office 14 August 1973 – 16 September 1978
- Prime Minister: Zulfikar Ali Bhutto
- Preceded by: Zulfikar Ali Bhutto
- Succeeded by: Zia-ul-Haq

6th Speaker of the National Assembly of Pakistan
- In office 15 August 1972 – 13 August 1973
- Deputy: Mohammad Haneef Khan
- Preceded by: Zulfikar Ali Bhutto
- Succeeded by: Sahibzada Farooq Ali

6th Deputy Speaker of the National Assembly of Pakistan
- In office 12 January 1965 – 25 March 1969
- Preceded by: Mohammad Afzal Cheema
- Succeeded by: A. T. M. Abdul Mateen

Speaker of the Provincial Assembly of West Pakistan
- In office 20 May 1956 – 7 October 1958
- Preceded by: Position established
- Succeeded by: Mubin-ul-Haq Siddiqui

Personal details
- Born: 1 January 1904 Marala, British India
- Died: 2 June 1982 (aged 78) Lahore, Pakistan
- Party: PPP (1969–1978)
- Other political affiliations: PMLC (1962–1969); RP (1956–1958); PML (1947–1956); AIML (1942–1947)
- Education: Aligarh Muslim University (LLB); University of the Punjab (MA)

Fazal Elahi Chaudhry (Note: Punjabi: فضل اِلٰہی چوہدری, Fazal Ilāhī Cauhdrī, pronounced [ˈfəzəl ɪläːɦiː ˈt͡ʃɔːɦdɾiː] Urdu: فضل الٰہی چودھری) (1 January 1904 – 1 June 1982) was a Pakistani barrister, politician and statesman who served as the fifth president of Pakistan from 1973 until his resignation in 1978, due to Zia-ul-Haq's martial law following the 1977 coup d'état which overthrew Zulfikar Ali Bhutto's government. He was the first legislatively-elected president in the country's history, serving as a constitutional figurehead.

Born in Kharian, Punjab, Chaudhry received his higher education at the Aligarh Muslim University and the University of the Punjab. He established his law firm in Lahore and further practised civil law. Entering early district-level administration in 1930, he was elected to the Gujrat District Board, unopposed. In 1942, he joined the All-India Muslim League and was elected the party president within the Punjab Muslim League for Gujrat District. He became active in the Pakistan Movement and took part in the 1946 Indian provincial elections in Punjab.

Following Pakistan's independence, Chaudhry was appointed the parliamentary secretary and later the education and health minister within the central cabinet in 1951. He was elected to the West Punjab Assembly from Gujrat District in the 1951 provincial election; and represented Pakistan in the United Nations in 1952. Being elected to the West Pakistan Assembly in 1956, Chaudhry served as its speaker until the 1958 coup d'état when the legislature was suspended. He joined the Convention Muslim League and was elected in the 1965 election to the National Assembly, serving as the legislature's deputy speaker until 1969 when Yahya Khan declared martial law and suspended the 1962 constitution. Chaudhry joined the Pakistan Peoples Party and contested the 1970 election, being elected once again to the National Assembly and later getting elected as its speaker in 1972.

Under the 1973 constitution, Chaudhry contested the 1973 presidential election as a candidate of the Peoples Party against the opposition coalition's contestant Khan Amirzadah Khan of the National Awami Party (Wali); which he won with an absolute electoral college majority. He was sworn in as the president on 14 August 1973, becoming the first ethnic Punjabi to hold the office. He succeeded Zulfikar Ali Bhutto as president, who was sworn in as the prime minister. He served as a figurehead as the presidency, under the newly-promulgated constitution, had become a ceremonial position with executive authority being vested in the prime minister's position. With the success of the 1977 coup d'état, the Bhutto-led federal government, alongside all provincial governments, was overthrown by Zia-ul-Haq, who assumed the position of chief martial law administrator; but Chaudhry continued his presidency with no influence over governmental, military and national affairs. Due to contentious relations with the Zia-led military government, he resigned from the presidency in September 1978, which was then assumed by Zia-ul-Haq.

Establishing himself from district-level administration to national politics and international diplomacy, Chaudhry remained a well-respected politician and legislator throughout his political career; and played his constitutionally nominal role as president. He died in June 1982 in Lahore at the age of 78.

== Early life and education ==
Fazal Elahi Chaudhry was born on 1 January 1904 into an influential Punjabi family of Muslim Gujjars in the village of Marala in the Kharian Tehsil of Gujrat District, Punjab.

After receiving his early education from Kharian, Chaudhry joined the prestigious Aligarh Muslim University in 1920 and moved to the United Provinces, receiving his LLB in civil law in 1924. Thereafter, Chaudhry returned to Punjab, settling in the capital Lahore, and attended the University of the Punjab's post-graduate school in law and political science. In 1925, Chaudhry obtained his MA in political science in 1925, and the advanced LLM in Law and Justice, in 1927.

After completing his education, Chaudhry established his law firm in Lahore, advocating for civil liberties, and went back to Gujrat, and started practising civil law.

== Political career ==
=== Early years (1942–1956) ===
In 1930, Chaudhry started taking interest in politics and participated in the 1930 Indian general election for the Gujrat District Board and was elected unopposed. He joined the Muslim League in 1942. In 1945, he was elected from Gujrat as the President of Muslim League. He took part in the 1946 Indian provincial elections on Muslim League's ticket and played an important role in propagating the ideas of the Muslim League among the people of his area. Upon the independence of Pakistan, he was given the post of Parliamentary Secretary, and was included in Liaquat Ali Khan's cabinet, serving as the education and health minister.

He further joined Pakistan permanent representative's delegation to the United Nations in 1951. In 1951, he contested the elections of the Punjab Legislative Assembly on the Muslim League ticket and was elected as a member of the Punjab Assembly. In 1952, he represented Pakistan in the United Nations.

=== Parliamentary roles (1956–1972) ===
In the 1956 elections, he was elected as member of the West Pakistan Assembly. Chaudhry served as the first Speaker of the West Pakistan Legislative Assembly from 20 May 1956 to 7 October 1958. In 1962, when Ayub Khan announced the elections, he was selected as the Deputy Opposition Leader of the House on the basis of his experience and knowledge about parliamentary proceedings. Chaudhry joined the Convention Muslim League, and after the 1965 presidential election, he was elected as the Deputy Speaker of the National Assembly, a role he served in till 1969.

He was elected as member of the National Assembly in 1970 on the ticket of the Pakistan Peoples Party, and was later elected as the Speaker of the National Assembly in 1972. He ended up joining the Pakistan Peoples Party.

== Presidency ==
He contested the Presidential Elections of 1973 against Khan Amirzadah Khan of NAP and all opposition parties, and was elected president in 1973 (receiving 139 votes against Khan's 45), when the head of the PPP, Zulfiqar Ali Bhutto was made prime minister. He was the first ethnic Punjabi president of the country.

Chaudhry was largely a figurehead, and was the first Pakistani President with less power than the Prime Minister. This was due to the new constitution of 1973 that gave more powers to the Prime Minister. Previously, the President had been the chief executive of Pakistan and had the power to appoint Prime Minister. After Operation Fair Play - a codename of the operation to remove Zulfikar Ali Bhutto from power - Chaudhry continued his presidency but had no influence in the government operations or the military and national affairs.

=== Resignation ===
After contentious relations with the military, Chaudhry decided to resign from his post despite the urging of the Chief of Army Staff and Chairman of Joint Chiefs of Staff. On 16 September 1978, Chaudhry handed the charge of the presidency to ruling military general Zia-ul-Haq who succeeded him as the sixth president, in addition to being the Chief Martial Law Administrator and the Chief of Army Staff.

== Death ==
Chaudhry died of a heart ailment on 1 June 1982 at the age of 78 in Lahore, Punjab.

== Notes ==
Political offices
| Preceded by Zulfikar Ali Bhutto | Speaker of the National Assembly; 1972–1973 | Succeeded by Sahibzada Farooq Ali |
| Preceded by Zulfikar Ali Bhutto | President of Pakistan; 1973–1978 | Succeeded by Muhammad Zia-ul-Haq |
