= Alvin Robert Cornelius =

Pakistani judge (1903–1991)

Alvin Robert Cornelius الوین رابرٹ كورنيليس H.Pk
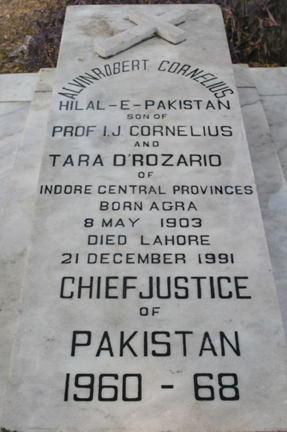

4th Chief Justice of Pakistan
- In office 13 May 1960 – 29 February 1968
- Appointed by: Ayub Khan
- Preceded by: Muhammad Shahabuddin
- Succeeded by: Sheikh Abdur Rehman

Chairperson of the Pakistan Cricket Board
- In office 1949 – 14 May 1953
- President: Ayub Khan
- Preceded by: Ayub Khan
- Succeeded by: Muzafar Hussain

Minister of Law and Justice
- In office 1969 – 16 December 1971
- President: General Yahya Khan

Personal details
- Born: 8 May 1903 Agra, United Provinces, British India
- Died: 21 December 1991 (aged 88) Lahore, Punjab, Pakistan
- Spouse: Ione Francis
- Children: 2
- Education: University of Allahabad; Selwyn College, Cambridge
- Awards: Hilal-i-Pakistan

Supreme Court of Pakistan

Alvin Robert Cornelius, H.Pk (8 May 1903 – 21 December 1991) was a Pakistani jurist, legal philosopher and judge, and the 4th Chief Justice of Pakistan (1960–1968). He later served as the Law Minister in the cabinet of Yahya Khan, from 1969 till 16 December 1971.

Cornelius was born in Agra, United Provinces of Agra and Oudh in British India, to an Urdu-speaking Anglo-Indian Roman Catholic family. He did his schooling at St. Peter's College, Agra. Cornelius graduated from the University of Allahabad and Selwyn College, Cambridge. He was commissioned into the Indian Civil Service and was the assistant commissioner in the Punjab, starting his judicial career in the Lahore High Court in 1943, later joining the Justice department of the Punjab government. During this time, Cornelius became a recognised jurist, publishing important textbooks in Pakistani legal history during his career. Cornelius also became a leading activist for the Pakistan Movement.

In 1946, Cornelius was elevated to associate judge of the Lahore High Court; opting for Pakistan, Cornelius became an important figure in country's legal history. Initially serving as the law secretary for Law Minister Jogendra Nath Mandal and Prime Minister Liaquat Ali Khan, Cornelius played an integral role in setting up the court system while advising the law minister and the prime minister. Among his notable cases were actions defending non-Muslims' rights (Freedom of religion), the Bogra case against presidential reserve powers (see the inactive Article 58(2)B of the VIII Amendment to the Constitution of Pakistan), defending workplace and labour laws, and sports law in regard to the Pakistan Cricket Board. Cornelius was regarded as a man of justice, fighting against religious extremism and religious discrimination, warning, in these regards, against "A general feeling of despair, a widespread lack of confidence... and a common readiness to anticipate the worst".

In 1960, President Ayub Khan nominated Cornelius to the Chief Justiceship of Pakistan; rivals for the position were briefly discussed, but eventually he was elevated to the position. Alvin Robert Cornelius became the first Christian Chief Justice, becoming one of the most famous and influential figures ever to serve on the Supreme Court. After his departure from the Court, Cornelius remained influential and was a symbol of the protection of the rights of minorities and freedom of religious practices, whilst serving as the legal adviser to successive governments on judicial matters.

== Early life ==
=== Family roots and education ===
Alvin Robert Cornelius was born on 8 May 1903, in Agra, United Provinces of the British Indian Empire, to a Christian Anglo-Indian Urdu-speaking family. He came from a well established family of Anglo-Indian ancestry with Luso-Indian roots on his maternal side, and his parents Professor I.J. Cornelius and Tara D' Rozario were amongst a few of the notable figures of the Roman Catholic Anglo-Indian minority community of India. His maternal grandfather, Michael D'Rozario was Deputy-Range Officer-Forests, Central India. His father was a professor of mathematics at Holkar college. He was a close friend of lawyer Ibrahim Ismail Chundrigar. Cornelius was admitted at the University of Allahabad after passing the university entrance exam in 1920. After admitting at the law school of the University of Allahabad, Cornelius gained his BS in mathematics and LLB in civil law, with writing a comprehensive thesis on history of religious law in 1924.

Cornelius joined the law faculty of the university, working there as a research associate, and won the government scholarship to pursue further education abroad. The same year, Cornelius went to the United Kingdom for his higher education and was admitted at Cambridge University, attending the Selwyn College to study law. In 1926, Cornelius graduated with LLM in Law and Justice and submitted his fundamental thesis on Western law. After reluctantly returning to India, Cornelius took the entrance exam and was commissioned as an officer at the Indian Civil Service, joining the Department of Law of the Government of Punjab.

== Career in law ==
He joined the Indian Civil Service in 1926. He served in Punjab, where he held the positions of Assistant Commissioner and District and Sessions Judge till 1943 when he joined Law Department of Government of Punjab as Legal Remembrancer. In 1946 Mr. Cornelius was elevated to the Bench of Lahore High Court.

=== Pakistan Movement ===
Cornelius was one of the notable Christian figures in the Pakistan Movement, closely collaborating with Mohammad Ali Jinnah. Cornelius was an active activist for the Pakistan Movement and one of the outspoken speakers of the movement, working to rally support for the Pakistan Movement. Unlike the opposition to the division of India, led by renowned Muslim leader Abul Kalam Azad, Cornelius felt that the creation of the Muslim homeland in India was one key solution to the ill-treatment of Muslims by the British government and among the leaders of the Congress Party of India, while at same time he revived the nationalism spirit. Cornelius assisted Jinnah drafting the Pakistan Resolution, adding the legal clauses and articles justifying the rights of Muslims majority, non-Muslim communities and the ill-treatment of under-class both Non-Muslims and Muslims by the Congress Party in 1941. His activism grew strong and deeper after accepting a legal position in the Punjab government, where he would go on to establish the court system of the newly created country. Cornelius was one of the earliest citizens of newly created country, Pakistan, opting for the country's citizenship as well as taking a federal law government assignment in the government of Liaquat Ali Khan.

=== Supreme Court of Pakistan ===
From 1950 to 1951, Cornelius served as secretary of Law and Labour at the Ministry of Law, Labour headed by Jogendra Nath Mandal. In 1951, following the assassination Prime minister Liaqat Ali Khan, Cornelius left the government assignment and was appointed an associate judge of the Supreme Court of Pakistan in November 1951 and continued as a judge with regular intervals until 1953 when he was confirmed as a senior judge of the Federal Court of Pakistan.

==== Bogra vs. Governor-General ====
In 1954, the National Assembly of Pakistan tried to change the constitution to establish checks on the Governor-General's powers, to prevent a repeat of what had happened to Nazimuddin's government. In response, Ghulam Muhammad dismissed the Assembly, an action that was challenged in the Supreme Court. Ghulam Muhammad emerged victorious when the Chief Justice Muhammad Munir upheld the dismissal in a split decision, despite the dissenting opinion written by the renowned Justice (later Chief Justice) A. R. Cornelius, and despite protests from the members of the Assembly.

=== Chief Justice of Pakistan ===
Justice A.R. Cornelius was appointed the Chief Justice of Pakistan in 1960.

== Legal philosophy ==
Legal mode of thought in the first 20 years of Pakistani history was dominated by two opposite currents: pro-secular and pro-Islamic. A peaceful co-existence of these two currents is precisely what distinguishes the first 20 years (1947 to 1966) from the next twenty (1967–1987), when the two currents became increasingly divergent in Pakistan.

The pro-secular tendency was apparently inherited from the colonial past, and was widespread among the intelligentsia and the educated. For a number of reasons it has been epitomised by Justice Muhammad Munir (1895–1979), who was the main author of the Munir Report (1954) about the anti-Ahmedi riots in Punjab. The report has long been hailed as a masterpiece of secular values.

Therefore, it is often seen as a matter of surprise that the same judge, after being promoted as the Chief Justice of Pakistan, upheld the dissolution of the Constituent Assembly by Governor-General Malik Ghulam Muhammad soon thereafter. Yet, it might help to remember that Munir's argument in favour of dictatorship – his famous 'Doctrine of Necessity' that provided excuse to all subsequent dictators – was also rooted in his western learning just like his secularism (he supported his argument on a maxim of the 13th century British jurist Henry de Bracton).

That it was left to a Christian to present the case of Islam at the highest ladder of jurisprudence in the formative phase of the Pakistan would be regarded by some as a paradox, and by others as corroboration of Muhammad Ali Jinnah's dream. Alvin Robert Cornelius was a relentless defender of Sharia, and arguably played the most important role in inculcating some Islamic values in the legal institutions of Pakistan.

Cornelius's legal philosophy revolved around his beliefs that (a) Law has a moral function in society; (b) Law should be culture-sensitive; and (c) Islam is a valid foundation for a universal society. He built upon these basic ideas in his 57 speeches and papers and applied them to his judgments.

In 1954, when the bench headed by Chief Justice Munir upheld the decision of the Governor-General to dissolve the constituent assembly, Cornelius was the only judge to write a note of dissent. Four years later, when the same court upheld the case of Dosso against the martial law authorities, Cornelius wrote a concurrent judgment (i.e. he agreed with the decision but felt the need to explain himself separately). He observed that fundamental rights are inalienable, and cannot be suspended even by martial law. This point of view was so different from the rest that it was later seen as a "note of dissent".

However, Cornelius' concept of inalienable rights seems to be slightly different from how the issue is usually projected. He was of the opinion that the people deserved to feel secure that law shall safeguard their cherished values and norms. In 'Crime and Punishment of Crime', the paper which he read at an international conference in Sydney in August 1965, he mentioned several cases to indicate "the extent to which the law supports the indigenous disciplines operating in our society, through the authority of the elders." For similar reasons, he defended the indigenous institution of jirga as well as the punishments prescribed by Sharia for crimes like theft and robbery.

Acutely aware of the tendency to treat each individual as an island, Cornelius offered a few words of caution to his international audience, and his words reflected the ethos of his new nation that had come into being with the specific goal of rediscovering society as an organic unity. "It must be recognised that crime is a biological fact of society, whether ancient or modern," he said. "It grows out of social condition and is not to be contained without the most careful examination of its etiology… In that process, it would be well not to reject, out of hand as being out-dated, the principles and techniques laid down and applied by the ancients, for dealing with the problem in their times. They may have their uses, and certainly in eastern countries, they still possess validity."

== Cricket ==
Cornelius was closely associated with the Lahore Gymkhana Cricket Club which played at Bagh-e-Jinnah. He was the main founding figure of Pakistan cricket after partition. Cornelius one of the three original vice-presidents of the Pakistan Cricket Board (then B.C.C.P.) and became chairman of the working committee, serving until he first relinquished his connection with the Board in early 1953. Cornelius was in September 1960 made chairman of the first Ad Hoc Committee, created to run cricket in Pakistan until May 1963. Cornelius's proudest achievement in cricket was to found the Pakistan Eaglets, an informal club of promising young Pakistani cricketers, which made tours of England in 1952 and 1953 in preparation for the first full Test tour of England in 1954.

== Death ==
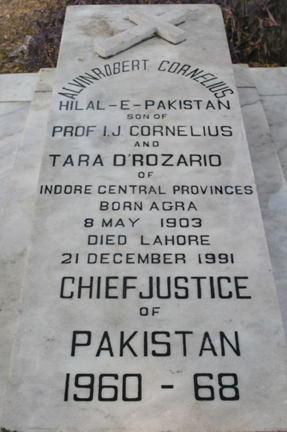
Grave in Lahore (2007).

Cornelius was residing permanently in Faletti's Hotel Lahore after retirement. He died at the age of 88 on 21 December 1991 in Lahore and was buried in the city's Christian cemetery.

== Works ==
- Law and judiciary in Pakistan; Lahore Law Times Publications; (1981)
- The ethical basis for democracy in Pakistan; Hamdard National Foundation, Pakistan; (1971)

== See also ==
- Chief Justice of Pakistan
- List of Pakistanis

Sporting positions
| Preceded by Iftikhar Khan | Chairperson of the Pakistan Cricket Board; 1949–1953 | Succeeded by Abdus Sattar Pirzada |
| Preceded by Ayub Khan | Chairperson of the Pakistan Cricket Board; 1960–1963 | Succeeded by Muzafar Hussain |
Legal offices
| Preceded by Muhammad Shahabuddin | Chief Justice of Pakistan; 1960–1968 | Succeeded by Sheikh Abdur Rehman |
