= List of heads of state of Pakistan =

Fifteen individuals have served as head of state of Pakistan, from the foundation of Pakistan in 1947 to the present day. The current head of state of Pakistan is Asif Ali Zardari, elected in 2024 after being nominated by the Pakistan People's Party.

From 1947 to 1956 the head of state was the Pakistani monarch, who was the same person as the monarch of the United Kingdom and the other Commonwealth realms. The monarch was represented in Pakistan by the Governor-General. Pakistan became a republic under the Constitution of 1956 and the monarch and Governor-General were replaced by a ceremonial President.

== Monarchy (1947–1956) ==
The succession to the throne of Pakistan was the same as the succession to the British throne.

No.	Portrait	Monarch (Birth–Death)	Reign			Prime ministers
No.	Portrait	Monarch (Birth–Death)	Start	End	Total	Prime ministers
1		George VI (1895–1952)	14 August 1947	6 February 1952	4 years, 176 days	Khan
1		George VI (1895–1952)	14 August 1947	6 February 1952	4 years, 176 days	Nazimuddin
2		Elizabeth II (1926–2022)	6 February 1952	23 March 1956	4 years, 46 days	Nazimuddin
2		Elizabeth II (1926–2022)	6 February 1952	23 March 1956	4 years, 46 days	Bogra
2		Elizabeth II (1926–2022)	6 February 1952	23 March 1956	4 years, 46 days	Ali

=== Governors-General ===
The Governor-General was the representative of the monarch in Pakistan and exercised most of the powers of the monarch. The Governor-General was appointed for an indefinite term, serving at the pleasure of the monarch. After the passage of the Statute of Westminster 1931, the Governor-General was appointed solely on the advice of the Cabinet of Pakistan without the involvement of the British government. In the event of a vacancy the Chief Justice served as Officer Administering the Government.

No.	Portrait	Name (Birth–Death)	Term of office			Monarch (Reign)
No.	Portrait	Name (Birth–Death)	Took office	Left office	Time in office	Monarch (Reign)
1		Muhammad Ali Jinnah (1876–1948)	14 August 1947	11 September 1948	1 year, 28 days	George VI (1947–1952)
Office vacant (11 September 1948 – 14 September 1948)						George VI (1947–1952)
2		Sir Khawaja Nazimuddin (1894–1964)	14 September 1948	17 October 1951	3 years, 33 days	George VI (1947–1952)
3		Sir Ghulam Muhammad (1895–1956)	17 October 1951	7 August 1955	3 years, 294 days	
3		Sir Ghulam Muhammad (1895–1956)	17 October 1951	7 August 1955	3 years, 294 days	Elizabeth II (1952–1956)
4		Iskander Mirza (1899–1969)	7 August 1955	23 March 1956	229 days	Elizabeth II (1952–1956)

== Republic (1956–present) ==
Under the 1956 Constitution, the first constitution of the Islamic Republic of Pakistan, the President replaced the monarch as ceremonial head of state. The President was elected by the Electoral College for a five-year term. In the event of a vacancy the Chairman of the Senate served as Acting President.

=== Presidents ===
No.	Portrait	Name (Birth–Death)	Term of office			Political party	Elected
No.	Portrait	Name (Birth–Death)	Took office	Left office	Time in office	Political party	Elected
Executive Role
1		Iskandar Ali Mirza سکندر علی مرزا (1899–1969)	23 March 1956	27 October 1958	2 years, 218 days	Republican	1956
2		Ayub Khan ایوب خان (1907–1974)	27 October 1958	8 June 1962	3 years, 224 days	Army	–
2		Ayub Khan ایوب خان (1907–1974)	8 June 1962	25 March 1969	6 years, 290 days	PMLC	1965
3		Yahya Khan یحییٰ خان (1917–1980)	25 March 1969	20 December 1971	2 years, 270 days	Army	–
4		Zulfikar Ali Bhutto ذولفقار علی بھٹو (1928–1979)	20 December 1971	14 August 1973	1 year, 237 days	PPP	1970
Ceremonial Role
5		Fazal Elahi Chaudhry فضل الہیٰ چودھری (1904–1982)	14 August 1973	16 September 1978	5 years, 33 days	PPP	1973
Executive Role
6		Muhammad Zia-ul-Haq محمد ضیا الحق (1924–1988)	16 September 1978	17 August 1988 †	9 years, 336 days	Army	–
Ceremonial Role
7		Ghulam Ishaq Khan غلام اسحاق خان (1915–2006)	17 August 1988	18 July 1993	4 years, 335 days	IND	1988
—		Wasim Sajjad وسیم سجاد (born 1941) acting	18 July 1993	14 November 1993	119 days	PMLN	–
8		Farooq Leghari فاروق لغاری (1940–2010)	14 November 1993	2 December 1997	4 years, 18 days	PPP	1993
—		Wasim Sajjad وسیم سجاد (born 1941) acting	2 December 1997	1 January 1998	30 days	PMLN	–
9		Muhammad Rafiq Tarar محمد رفیق تاڑر (1929–2022)	1 January 1998	20 June 2001	3 years, 170 days	PMLN	1997
Executive Role
10		Pervez Musharraf پرویز مشرف (1943–2023)	20 June 2001	15 October 2007	6 years, 117 days	Army	2004
10		Pervez Musharraf پرویز مشرف (1943–2023)	19 November 2007	18 August 2008	273 days	PML(Q)	2007
Ceremonial Role
—		Muhammad Mian Soomro محمد میاں سومرو (born 1950) acting	18 August 2008	9 September 2008	22 days	PML(Q)	–
11		Asif Ali Zardari آصف علی زرداری (born 1955)	9 September 2008	9 September 2013	5 years	PPP	2008
12		Mamnoon Hussain ممنون حسین (1940–2021)	9 September 2013	9 September 2018	5 years	PMLN	2013
13		Arif Alvi عارف علوی (born 1949)	9 September 2018	10 March 2024	5 years, 183 days	PTI	2018
14		Asif Ali Zardari آصف علی زرداری (born 1955)	10 March 2024	Incumbent	2 years, 234 days	PPP	2024

== See also ==
- Governor-General of Pakistan
- President of Pakistan
  - List of international trips made by presidents of Pakistan
- Vice President of Pakistan
- Prime Minister of Pakistan
  - List of prime ministers of Pakistan
