= 1984 in Pakistan =

- Decades: 1960s; 1970s; 1980s; 1990s; 2000s
- See also: History of Pakistan; List of years in Pakistan; Timeline of Pakistani history

Events in the year 1984 in the Islamic Republic of Pakistan.

== Incumbents ==
=== Federal government ===
- President: Muhammad Zia-ul-Haq
- Chief Justice: Mohammad Haleem

=== Governors ===
- Governor of Balochistan:
  - until 12 March: Rahimuddin Khan
  - 22 March-18 November: F. S. Lodhi
  - starting 18 November: Ghulam Ali khetran
- Governor of Khyber Pakhtunkhwa: Fazle Haq
- Governor of Punjab: Ghulam Jilani Khan
- Governor of Sindh: S.M. Abbasi (until 6 April); Jahan Dad Khan (starting 6 April)

== Events ==
- Anti-Ahmadi activities grew stronger and General Zia's government also took part in it. Ordinance XX was passed, which practically criminalized the Ahmadiyya faith.[1] As a result, Mirza Tahir Ahmad had to migrate to England.
- Pakistan won the gold medal in the 1984 Los Angeles Olympic Games in the men's hockey event, beating Germany 2-1 and becoming Olympic champions for the third time.
- A referendum on the Islamisation policy of President Muhammad Zia-ul-Haq was held in Pakistan on 19 December 1984. Voters were asked whether they supported Zia-ul-Haq's proposals for amending several laws in accordance with the Quran and Sunnah, whether they wanted this process to continue, and whether they supported the Islamist ideology of Pakistan.[1] The referendum also served as way of extending Zia-ul-Haq's presidential term by five years.[2] Official results declared it approved by 98.5% of voters, with a turnout of 62.2%.[1] Independent observers questioned whether voter participation had reached 30% and noted that there had been "widespread irregularities".[3]

== See also ==
- List of Pakistani films of 1984
