= 1988 in Pakistan =

- Decades: 1960s; 1970s; 1980s; 1990s; 2000s
- See also: History of Pakistan; List of years in Pakistan; Timeline of Pakistani history

Events in the year 1988 in Pakistan.

== Incumbents ==
=== Federal government ===
- President: Muhammad Zia-ul-Haq (until 17 August), Ghulam Ishaq Khan (starting 17 August)
- Prime Minister: Muhammad Khan Junejo (until 29 May), Benazir Bhutto (starting 2 December)
- Chief Justice: Mohammad Haleem

=== Governors ===
- Governor of Balochistan – Musa Khan
- Governor of Khyber Pakhtunkhwa – Fida Mohammad Khan (until 16 June); Amir Gulistan Janjua (starting 16 June)
- Governor of Punjab – Sajjad Hussain Qureshi (until 9 December); Tikka Khan (starting 9 December)
- Governor of Sindh –
  - until 23 June: Ashraf W. Tabani
  - 23 June – 12 September: Rahimuddin Khan
  - starting 12 September: Qadeeruddin Ahmed

== Events ==
- April – Ojhri Camp, The ammunition Depot located at ojhri camp Rawalpindi mysteriously exploded on 10 April 1988 at 1000 hrs. Rockets fired randomly in every direction, killing many people and destroying many houses the city of Rawalpindi.
- May – 1988 Gilgit massacre
- August – General Zia, the U.S. ambassador and top Pakistan army officials die in mysterious air crash on 17 August. General Zia's death in 1988 ends an 11-year military rule.
- November – Benazir Bhutto's PPP wins the general election.
- 10 December – An Antonov An-26 of Ariana Afghan Airlines was shot down in Pakistani territory by Pakistani fighters on a passenger flight from Khost to Kabul, killing all 25 occupants. Pakistan denied the shooting.

== Births ==
- 14 February – Zainab Abbas, sports presenter
- 21 September – Bilawal Bhutto Zardari, politician
- 18 December – Imad Wasim, cricketer

== Deaths ==
- 5 August – Arif Hussain Hussaini, leader of Pakistani Shia Muslims (b. 1946; assassinated)
- 7 September – Abdul Haq, Islamic scholar (b. 1912)
