= 1982 in Pakistan =

- Decades: 1960s; 1970s; 1980s; 1990s; 2000s
- See also: History of Pakistan; List of years in Pakistan; Timeline of Pakistani history

Events from the year 1982 in Pakistan.

== Incumbents ==
=== Federal government ===
- President: Muhammad Zia-ul-Haq
- Chief Justice: Mohammad Haleem

=== Governors ===
- Governor of Balochistan: Rahimuddin Khan
- Governor of Khyber Pakhtunkhwa: Fazle Haq
- Governor of Punjab: Ghulam Jilani Khan
- Governor of Sindh: S.M. Abbasi

== Events ==
- Pakistan builds its first workable nuclear device.

== Births ==
- January 3 – Salman Akbar, field hockey player
- January 13 – Kamran Akmal, cricketer
- February 1 – Shoaib Malik, cricketer
- December 18 – Ameer Khan, cricketer

== See also ==
- List of Pakistani films of 1982
