= 1978 in Pakistan =

- Decades: 1950s; 1960s; 1970s; 1980s; 1990s
- See also: History of Pakistan; List of years in Pakistan; Timeline of Pakistani history

Events from the year 1978 in Pakistan.

== Incumbents ==
=== Federal government ===
- President: Fazal Ilahi Chaudhry (until 16 September), Muhammad Zia-ul-Haq (starting 16 September)
- Chief Justice: Sheikh Anwarul Haq

=== Governors ===
- Governor of Balochistan: Khuda Bakhsh Marri (until 18 September); Rahimuddin Khan (starting 18 September)
- Governor of Khyber Pakhtunkhwa: Abdul Hakeem Khan (until 11 October); Fazle Haq (starting 11 October)
- Governor of Punjab: Aslam Riaz Hussain (until 11 October); Sawar Khan (starting 11 October)
- Governor of Sindh: Abdul Kadir Shaikh (until 6 July); S.M. Abbasi (starting 6 July)

== Events ==
- Name of Montgomery District changes to Sahiwal District
- January 2 – On the orders of Muhammad Zia-ul-Haq, paramilitary forces opened fire on peaceful protesting workers in Multan. It is known as 1978 massacre at Multan Colony Textile Mills.
- 18 June – The Karakoram Highway is completed.

== Sports ==
=== Cricket ===
- 16 October – Test cricket debut of Kapil Dev, India vs. Pakistan at Faisalabad.
- 19 June – Ian Botham takes 8-34 vs. Pakistan, his best Test cricket bowling.
- 1 June – Test cricket debut of David Gower, vs. Pakistan at Edgbaston Cricket Ground, scores 58.

=== Hockey ===
- 24 November – The first Champions Trophy held in Lahore is won by Pakistan.

== Births ==
- 18 March – Irfan Manan Khan, Secretary General

== See also ==
- List of Pakistani films of 1978
