= 1983 in Pakistan =

- Decades: 1960s; 1970s; 1980s; 1990s; 2000s
- See also: History of Pakistan; List of years in Pakistan; Timeline of Pakistani history

== Incumbents ==
=== Federal government ===
- President: Muhammad Zia-ul-Haq
- Chief Justice: Mohammad Haleem

=== Governors ===
- Governor of Balochistan: Rahimuddin Khan
- Governor of Khyber Pakhtunkhwa: Fazle Haq
- Governor of Punjab: Ghulam Jilani Khan
- Governor of Sindh: S.M. Abbasi

== Events ==
- 12 February: 1983 women's march, Lahore
- In late February an incident of mass hysteria occurred at Hawke's Bay Beach leading to 18 casualties.
- August, September 1983: Movement for the Restoration of Democracy
- The first F-16 is inducted into the Pakistan Air Force (PAF).
- Pakistan conduct cold test of a nuclear device, proving the state as one of recognized nuclear weapons state. The test was not announced publicly until 1998.
- The Indian Army captures Siachen in a military raid.
- December 31 – The 7.2 mb Hindu Kush earthquake affects northern Afghanistan and Pakistan with a maximum Mercalli intensity of VII (Very strong), killing 12–26 and injuring 60–483.
- 36 anniversary of The Islamic Republic of Pakistan's independence from the United Kingdom.

== Births ==
- 24 November – Anoushay Abbasi, actress and model
- 1 January - Iqbal Masih - Pakistani activist against child labor

== Deaths ==
- 6 December – Mir Gul Khan Nasir, politician and poet from Balochistan, Pakistan.

== See also ==
- List of Pakistani films of 1983
