= 1981 in Pakistan =

- Decades: 1960s; 1970s; 1980s; 1990s; 2000s
- See also: History of Pakistan; List of years in Pakistan; Timeline of Pakistani history

== Incumbents ==
=== Federal government ===
- President: Muhammad Zia-ul-Haq
- Chief Justice: Sheikh Anwarul Haq (until 25 March), Mohammad Haleem

=== Governors ===
- Governor of Balochistan: Rahimuddin Khan
- Governor of Khyber Pakhtunkhwa: Fazle Haq
- Governor of Punjab: Ghulam Jilani Khan
- Governor of Sindh: S.M. Abbasi

== Events ==
=== March ===
- 2 March 1981 – Pakistan International Airlines Flight 326 is hijacked by armed men belonging to Al-Zulfiqar. At the time, it was the longest hijacking in history.

== See also ==
- List of Pakistani films of 1981
