= 1987 in Pakistan =

- Decades: 1960s; 1970s; 1980s; 1990s; 2000s
- See also: History of Pakistan; List of years in Pakistan; Timeline of Pakistani history

Events from the year 1987 in Pakistan.

== Incumbents ==
=== Federal government ===
- President: Muhammad Zia-ul-Haq
- Prime Minister: Muhammad Khan Junejo
- Chief Justice: Mohammad Haleem

=== Governors ===
- Governor of Balochistan – Musa Khan
- Governor of Khyber Pakhtunkhwa – Fida Mohammad Khan
- Governor of Punjab – Sajjad Hussain Qureshi
- Governor of Sindh – Rahimuddin Khan

== Events ==
- The England cricket team's tour of Pakistan results in a conflict between Pakistani umpire Shakoor Rana and the England captain Mike Gatting.
- 28 April – Balochistan Assembly Building was inaugurated by Muhammad Khan Junejo.
- 14 August – Pakistan celebrates 40 years of independence.
