= 1990 in Pakistan =

- Decades: 1970s; 1980s; 1990s; 2000s; 2010s
- See also: History of Pakistan; List of years in Pakistan; Timeline of Pakistani history

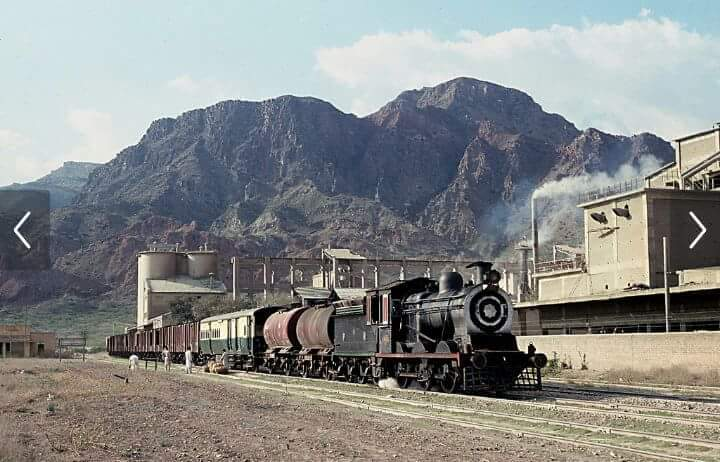
Dandot railway station in 1990

Events in the year 1990 in Pakistan.

== Incumbents ==
=== Federal government ===
- President: Ghulam Ishaq Khan
- Prime Minister:
  - until 6 August: Benazir Bhutto
  - 6 August-6 November: Ghulam Mustafa Jatoi
  - starting 6 November: Nawaz Sharif
- Chief Justice: Muhammad Afzal Zullah (starting 1 January)

=== Governors ===
- Governor of Balochistan – Musa Khan
- Governor of Khyber Pakhtunkhwa – Amir Gulistan Janjua
- Governor of Punjab – Tikka Khan (until 6 August); Mian Muhammad Azhar (starting 6 August)
- Governor of Sindh – Fakhruddin G. Ebrahim (until 6 August); Mahmoud Haroon (starting 6 August)

== Events ==
- January: Sukkur rail disaster.
- August: Benazir Bhutto's first government is dismissed as Prime Minister of Pakistan on charges of incompetence and corruption by President Ghulam Ishaq Khan. See Mehrangate.
- August-November: Ghulam Mustafa Jatoi heads Pakistan's first caretaker government after Benazir Bhutto's dismissal.
- October: The United States cuts off aid to Pakistan under suspicion that Pakistan is developing nuclear weapons.
- November: Jatoi's caretaker government ends following general elections in October which see Nawaz Sharif and the IJI come to power.

== Births ==
- 10 April - Fakhar Zaman, cricketer

== Deaths ==
- 6 April - Najeeb Ahmed, leftist student activist

== See also ==
- List of Pakistani films of 1990
