= 1989 in Pakistan =

- Decades: 1960s; 1970s; 1980s; 1990s; 2000s
- See also: History of Pakistan; List of years in Pakistan; Timeline of Pakistani history

Events in the year 1989 in Pakistan.

== Incumbents ==
=== Federal government ===
- President: Ghulam Ishaq Khan
- Prime Minister: Benazir Bhutto
- Chief Justice: Mohammad Haleem (until 31 December)

=== Governors ===
- Governor of Balochistan – Musa Khan
- Governor of Khyber Pakhtunkhwa – Amir Gulistan Janjua
- Governor of Punjab – Tikka Khan
- Governor of Sindh – Qadeeruddin Ahmed (until 19 April); Fakhruddin G. Ebrahim (starting 19 April)

== Events ==
- 20 October–27 October – The South Asian Games take place in Islamabad.
- Pakistan announces the successful test firing of the Hatf-1 and Hatf-2 missiles.
- The science-fiction film Shaani is released.
- Pakistan returns to its status as a Commonwealth republic, having been outside the Commonwealth of Nations since January 1972.

== Deaths ==
- Brigadier Tariq Mehmood: 29 May 1989
