= 1986 in Pakistan =

- Decades: 1960s; 1970s; 1980s; 1990s; 2000s
- See also: History of Pakistan; List of years in Pakistan; Timeline of Pakistani history

Events of the year 1986 in Pakistan.

== Incumbents ==
=== Federal government ===
- President: Muhammad Zia-ul-Haq
- Prime Minister: Muhammad Khan Junejo
- Chief Justice: Mohammad Haleem

=== Governors ===
- Governor of Balochistan: Musa Khan
- Governor of Khyber Pakhtunkhwa:
  - until 18 April: Nawabzada Abdul Ghafoor Khan Hoti
  - 18 April-27 August: Musa Khan
  - starting 27 August: Fida Mohammad Khan
- Governor of Punjab: Sajjad Hussain Qureshi
- Governor of Sindh: Jahan Dad Khan

== Events ==
- Zulfiqar Ali Bhutto's daughter Benazir returns from exile to lead the Pakistan Peoples Party (PPP) in a campaign for fresh elections.

=== September ===
- 5 September;– Pan Am Flight 73, with 358 people on board, is hijacked at Karachi International Airport by four Abu Nidal terrorists.

=== December ===
- 14 December;– Qasba Aligarh massacre, violence against Muhajirs by newly settled Pashtuns from KPK, Pakistan and Afghanistan.
