= 1980 in Pakistan =

- Decades: 1960s; 1970s; 1980s; 1990s; 2000s
- See also: History of Pakistan; List of years in Pakistan; Timeline of Pakistani history

Events from the year 1980 in Pakistan.

== Incumbents ==
=== Federal government ===
- President: Muhammad Zia-ul-Haq
- Chief Justice: Sheikh Anwarul Haq

=== Governors ===
- Governor of Balochistan: Rahimuddin Khan
- Governor of Khyber Pakhtunkhwa: Fazle Haq
- Governor of Punjab: Sawar Khan (until 1 May); Ghulam Jilani Khan (starting 1 May)
- Governor of Sindh: S.M. Abbasi

== Events ==
- The United States pledges military assistance to Pakistan following Soviet intervention in Afghanistan.
- The Pakistan Export Processing Zone Authority (EPZA) was established
- May - the Federal Shariat Court was established

== See also ==
- List of Pakistani films of 1980
