= 1979 in Pakistan =

- Decades: 1950s; 1960s; 1970s; 1980s; 1990s
- See also: History of Pakistan; List of years in Pakistan; Timeline of Pakistani history

Events from the year 1979 in Pakistan.

== Incumbents ==
=== Federal government ===
- President: Muhammad Zia-ul-Haq
- Chief Justice: Sheikh Anwarul Haq

=== Governors ===
- Governor of Balochistan: Rahimuddin Khan
- Governor of Khyber Pakhtunkhwa: Fazle Haq
- Governor of Punjab: Sawar Khan
- Governor of Sindh: S.M. Abbasi

== Events ==
- 4 April – Deposed prime minister of Pakistan Zulfikar Ali Bhutto is executed in Rawalpindi.
- 21 November – After false radio reports from the Ayatollah Khomeini that the Americans have occupied the Grand Mosque in Mecca, the United States Embassy in Islamabad, Pakistan is attacked by a mob and set afire, killing 4. (See: Foreign relations of Pakistan)
- 10 December – Abdus Salam wins the first Nobel Prize for the country.

== Births ==
- 18 April – Tasqeen Qadeer, cricketer
- 30 June – Faisal Shahzad, bomber

== See also ==
- List of Pakistani films of 1979
