= 1985 in Pakistan =

- Decades: 1960s; 1970s; 1980s; 1990s; 2000s
- See also: History of Pakistan; List of years in Pakistan; Timeline of Pakistani history

Events from the year 1985 in Pakistan.

== Incumbents ==
- # Martial law and ban on political parties lifted.
- # General elections held under military rule.
- # Controversial eighth Amendment is passed.
- # March 24—Military chief Zia-ul Haq resigns from prime minister ship and Mohammad Khan Junejo (1932–1993) of Pakistan Muslim League becomes twelfth prime minister.
- # Gen. Zia ul-Haq of Military President.

=== Federal government ===
- President: Muhammad Zia-ul-Haq
- Prime Minister: Muhammad Khan Junejo (starting 24 March)
- Chief Justice: Mohammad Haleem

=== Governors ===
- Governor of Balochistan: Ghulam Ali khetran (until 30 December); Musa Khan (starting 30 December)
- Governor of Khyber Pakhtunkhwa: Fazle Haq (until 12 December); Nawabzada Abdul Ghafoor Khan Hoti (starting 30 December)
- Governor of Punjab: Ghulam Jilani Khan (until 30 December); Sajjad Hussain Qureshi (starting 30 December)
- Governor of Sindh: Jahan Dad Khan

== Events ==
- Martial law and the ban on political parties are lifted (Eighth Amendment to the Constitution of Pakistan).

== Births ==
- February 2 - Sanam Saeed, actress
- April 13 – Shoaib Khan, left-handed batsman
- June 28 - Wahab Riaz, cricketer.February 3-Samad Khan teacher.

== See also ==
- List of Pakistani films of 1985
