= Muhammad Bux Lashari =

Pakistani politician

- محمد بخش لاشاري
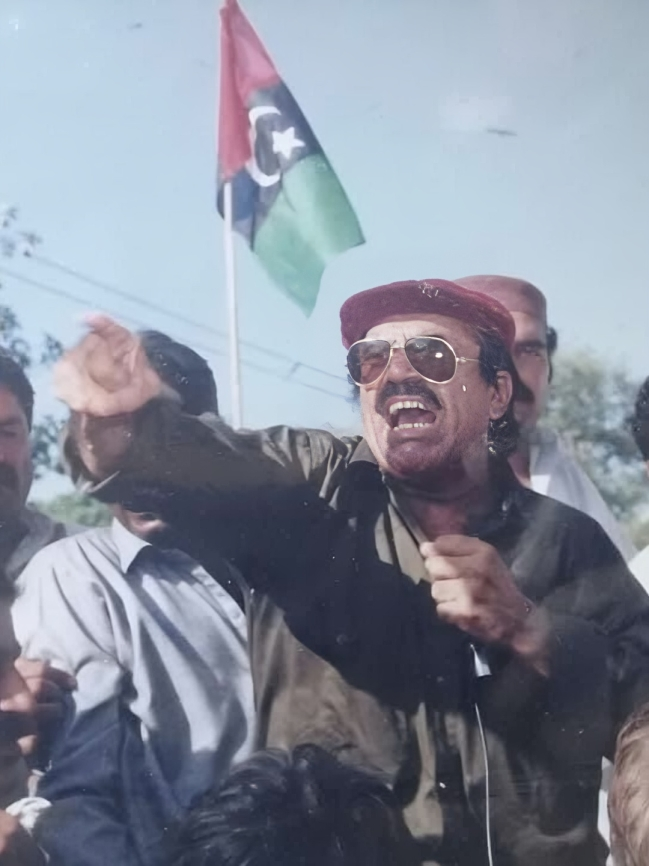

Provincial Minister of Sindh for Kachchi Abadi
- In office 1988–1990
- Governor: Qadeeruddin Ahmed; Fakhruddin G. Ebrahim
- Chief Minister: Syed Qaim Ali Shah
- Constituency: PS-73 (Karachi-West-I)
- In office 19 November 1988 – 8 August 1990

Personal details
- Born: Shikarpur, Sindh
- Party: Pakistan People's Party
- Profession: Lawyer, Politician

Muhammad Bux Lashari (Sindhi: محمد بخش لاشاري) was a Pakistani lawyer and politician who held the office of Provincial Minister at the Government of Sindh for Kachchi Abadi. He was also a Member of the Provincial Assembly of Sindh from 1988 to May 1990.

== Early life and career ==
Muhammad Bux Lashari was born in Shikarpur, Pakistan. By profession, he was a lawyer and later became involved in politics by joining the Pakistan People's Party (PPP).

== Political career ==
Lashari began his political journey with the PPP and was known for his commitment to the party's ideology. In June 1981, under Martial Law Regulations Nos. 72 and 78, he was among nine leaders of various defunct political parties who were arrested in Karachi. He was later released on 17 July 1981, from Karachi Central Jail.

In the 1988 general elections, Muhammad Bux Lashari contested from PS-73 (Karachi West) and secured a victory with 20,941 votes. Following his win, he was appointed as the Minister for Katchi Abadis in the government of Prime Minister Benazir Bhutto.

== Roles and achievements ==
Provincial Minister: Served as the Minister for Katchi Abadis in the 1988 PPP government.

Party Positions: Central Additional Secretary of the PPP Lawyers Wing.

Community Role: Organizer of the Pakistan Lashari Baloch Tanzeem.

== Legacy ==
Muhammad Bux Lashari was a prominent figure in the legal and political communities of Pakistan. His contributions to PPP and the development of Katchi Abadis were widely recognized.
