= Qasba Aligarh massacre =

1986 massacre in Sindh, Pakistan

Coordinates: 24°56′11.0″N 67°00′53.7″E

Qasba Aligarh Massacre
- Location: Qasba Colony
- Date: 14 December 1986; 2:30 PM – 4:30 AM
- Attack type: Mass shooting
- Deaths: 49–400+
- Perpetrators: Afghan refugees Pakistani Pashtuns from the tribal belt

The Qasba–Aligarh massacre was a massacre that took place when recently settled armed Pashtuns from tribal belt in northwestern Pakistan attacked densely populated localities in Qasba Colony, Aligarh Colony, Sajidabad and Sector 1-D of Orangi in Karachi, in the early hours of the morning on 14 December 1986. According to the official reports, 49 people (more than 400 according to unofficial reports) were killed and several hundred were injured, in what was perceived as a "revenge killings" following an unsuccessful raid on an Pashtun heroin processing and distribution center in Sohrab Goth by the security forces who were met with violent retaliation. As part of the operation, the security forces surrounded the area with bulldozers destroying illegally encroached houses and removing the residents. Most of the residents of the two colonies who were attacked as a result happened to be Muhajirs, such as Biharis who had been freshly repatriated from Bangladesh.

== Background ==
=== Influx of Afghan refugees and the Kalashnikov culture ===
During the Soviet–Afghan War in the late 1970s and early 1980s, millions of Afghan refugees had made their way into Pakistan. An estimated population of about 6 million refugees were welcomed into Pakistan under Islamization programme of General Zia-ul-Haq. These refugees gradually settled in populated urban centers throughout the country, including the southern cities of Hyderabad and Karachi. Many of the Afghan refugees that made their way into Karachi settled in bastis at the outskirts of the city, which included areas like Sohrab Goth.

The magnitude of refugees migrating into Pakistan had a huge socio-economic impact on the country's society, promoting wider availability of illegal narcotic drugs like heroin, and automatic firearms, including the AK-47 rifles. Where Pakistan had previously been drug-free and largely de-weaponised, the country soon became flooded with automatic weapons along with the rise of drug abuse in the early 1980s. The sudden proliferation of firearms has since been dubbed as the "Kalashnikov culture".

=== Changing housing market ===
This influx of Afghan refugees gave rise to informal Pashtun entrepreneurs who joined in Karachi’s informal housing market. Many of the Pashtuns landed jobs as policemen and started investing in real estate while several drug and arms barons also made their way into Karachi's ethnic and political stage as a result. As the Punjabi and Muhajir influence grew weak in Karachi's informal housing market, the Pashtun entrepreneurs imposed greater control over the land. They started seizing land by force, following which real estate developers would develop plots and rent out to tenants who could be evicted at will. Thus coercion and violence became a common modus vivendi of the Afghans.

=== Karachi's growing ethnic strife ===
The urban centres of Karachi and Hyderabad had increasingly become ethnically diverse and riots along ethnic lines were commonplace. The brimming ethnic conflict evolved into territorial demarcation on ethnic grounds, with power being accumulated into the hands of local criminal elements, particularly in and around areas of Orangi. In April 1985, Karachi faced its first major ethnic riot that claimed the lives of at least a hundred people. The riot mobilized Muhajir and Bihari basti dwellers against Pashtun gunmen who had tried to extend their influence to those neighborhoods. The main battlefield was situated between Banaras Chowk and the Metro Cinema in Orangi, an area adjacent to newly settled Pashtun strongholds. Later on the morning of 15 April 1985, another Pashtun-Muhajir ethnic clash broke out when an Afghan minivan driver struck and killed a schoolgirl, Bushra Zaidi. The Pashtun driver had been eager to outrun a competitor without respecting a traffic light, hitting a vehicle and then running into a group of students of Sir Syed Government Girls College in Liaquatabad. In the hours immediately following the incident, a mob of angry young students organized a protest demonstration which was brutally repressed by the police. Tensions between the Pashtun and Muhajir populations grew to a boiling point after the incident. The police were later accused of molesting and raping young female students after officers entered the Sir Syed College. The alleged police brutality later fuelled the anger of Muhajirs and violence erupted throughout the city all the way from Liaquatabad in the east to Orangi to the west. Eager to provoke the police, the young students set buses and minivans on fire and were inevitably met with harsh responses.

=== Police crackdown in Sohrab Goth ===
As complaints came flooding in about the increase in crime rates throughout Karachi, particularly those fueled by ethnic conflicts, newspapers began highlighting the issue in their headlines and the government of Sindh found the need for a crackdown on the various criminal elements within the afghan refugees settlements in the city. On 12 December 1986, the Sindh governor Lt Gen Jahan Dad Khan ordered a police operation in the vicinity of Sohrab Goth in Karachi. Guised as an anti-encroachment operation, a team was assembled under DC Sardar Ahmed, DIG Karachi, and IGP Sindh to root out and arrest criminal elements. They were also asked to relocate the illegal encroachers from al-Asif Square in Sohrab Goth to a new site near the National Highway.

The police had wanted to raid a Pashtun heroin processing and distribution centre in Sohrab Goth. However, when they approached the neighborhood, they were met with violent retaliation. As part of the operation, the security forces surrounded the area with bulldozers destroying illegally encroached houses and removing the residents. Some reports also suggest that just before the operation, the police had entered adjacent Orangi townships that were predominantly Muhajir and seized caches of arms which were stored for self-defense.

== Massacre at Qasba and Aligarh colonies ==
A group of several armed men with Kalashnikov rifles charged down the hill overlooking the Qasba and Aligarh colonies, and Sector 1-D of Orangi Town at around 2:30pm. The invaders are said to have set people's houses on fire using kerosene tanks "under [the] cover of a hail of gunfire".

In less than two hours an estimated 400 people were murdered. Hundreds more were injured and many more escaped from the roof to save their lives. However, according to official figures, there were only 49 deaths. By 4:30 pm, hundreds of homes were burnt to the ground. As per one of the survivors, "they came inside out houses and asked for men", "they killed indiscriminately with knives and guns chanting Allah-o-Akbar as if we were infidels" said one of the survivors who lost her father and elder brother sobbing and she was correct. Mosques were used to mobilize people to kill and there were speeches and sermons given against the people living in Qasba Aligarh by the clerics stating that "killing them would take one to heaven".

== Reaction and aftermath ==
The former chief justice of the Supreme Court Sajjad Ali Shah conducted an inquiry into the incident and wrote in his findings or that "it [was] the worst kind of massacre [he] had ever witnessed, where women, children and men from Muhajir community were slaughtered by illegal immigrants [and] the Corps Commander Karachi should have questioned as to why the army was asked to retreat approximately two hours before the incident took place". He suggested the existence of "foul-play". The report was sent to Islamabad where he criticized the Sindh administration and the governor’s role in the event. The report of fact-finding mission was ignored by the establishment.

In an interview with Mazhar Abbas, former Sindh chief minister Syed Ghous Ali Shah said that the judicial commission led by the chief justice was able to shed some light on the issues giving rise to the Qasba–Aligarh massacre and disclosed revealing details of negligence in the security forces. However, he confessed that the report was not brought to light because the government at the time had feared it would create more chaos.

== See also ==
- List of massacres in Pakistan
