= Trial of Zulfikar Ali Bhutto =

1977–1979 murder trial of former Pakistani prime minister

The State v. Zulfikar Ali Bhutto
- Court: Lahore High Court
- Verdict: Bhutto convicted of conspiracy to murder and was sentenced to death by the Lahore High Court; Conviction upheld on appeal by a 4–3 majority of the Supreme Court of Pakistan
- Citations: The State v. Zulfikar Ali Bhutto and Others. Pakistan Law Decisions (Report). Vol. 1978. Lahore High Court. p. 523.; Zulfikar Ali Bhutto v. The State. Pakistan Law Decisions (Report). Vol. 1979. Supreme Court of Pakistan. p. 53.

Court membership
- Judges sitting: Maulvi Mushtaq Hussain and four others

The trial of Zulfikar Ali Bhutto was the murder prosecution of Zulfikar Ali Bhutto, the former prime minister of Pakistan, in the Lahore High Court and, on appeal, the Supreme Court of Pakistan. Bhutto was tried over the 1974 ambush in Lahore in which opposition politician Ahmad Raza Kasuri survived and his father, Nawab Mohammad Ahmad Khan Kasuri, was killed. On 18 March 1978, a five-member Lahore High Court bench convicted Bhutto and sentenced him to death. On 6 February 1979, the Supreme Court upheld the sentence by a 4–3 majority, and a review petition was dismissed on 24 March 1979.

The case became one of the most controversial trials in Pakistan's history. Bhutto's supporters and many later commentators described it as a case of judicial murder, while critics of the proceedings pointed to the political climate under martial law, the direct transfer of the case to the High Court, allegations of judicial bias, and the reliance on approver testimony. In March 2024, responding to a presidential reference, the Supreme Court unanimously opined that the proceedings before both the Lahore High Court and the Supreme Court did not meet the requirements of fair trial and due process, although it said that the law provided no mechanism to set aside the conviction after it had attained finality.

== Background ==
On the night of 10–11 November 1974, Ahmad Raza Kasuri's car was attacked near Shadman in Lahore. Kasuri survived, but his father, Nawab Mohammad Ahmad Khan Kasuri, was killed. Kasuri, once a founding member of the Pakistan Peoples Party (PPP) but later one of Bhutto's political critics, alleged that Bhutto had been behind the attack.

After General Muhammad Zia-ul-Haq overthrew Bhutto in the 1977 Pakistani military coup, the case was reopened. Bhutto was arrested in September 1977 in connection with the Kasuri case, granted bail by Justice K. M. A. Samdani of the Lahore High Court, and then rearrested under martial law regulations within days. According to later legal criticism and commentary revisited during the 2024 presidential reference proceedings, the state then secured transfer of the murder case from the ordinary trial court to the Lahore High Court, an unusual procedure that removed one tier of criminal appeal ordinarily available to an accused facing a capital charge.

== Proceedings in the Lahore High Court ==
The case was tried by a five-member Lahore High Court bench headed by acting Chief Justice Maulvi Mushtaq Hussain. The prosecution alleged that Bhutto had entered into a conspiracy with Federal Security Force (FSF) director general Masood Mahmood to murder Ahmad Raza Kasuri, and that FSF officers carried out the attack in Lahore after earlier failed attempts to kill Kasuri elsewhere. The High Court judgment said the prosecution relied on Kasuri's testimony, the evidence of approvers including Masood Mahmood and Ghulam Hussain, documentary material, and statements by co-accused FSF officials.

In its judgment, the Lahore High Court held that the prosecution had proved motive, conspiracy, and participation by Bhutto and the co-accused in the plot against Kasuri. On 18 March 1978, the court convicted Bhutto and sentenced him to death. Four co-accused were also given capital punishment.

== Appeal to the Supreme Court ==
Bhutto appealed to the Supreme Court of Pakistan. The court began hearing the appeal on 20 May 1978 and reserved judgment on 23 December 1978. On 6 February 1979, a seven-member bench dismissed the appeal by a 4–3 majority and upheld the Lahore High Court judgment.

The majority opinion was delivered by Chief Justice Anwarul Haq and joined by Justices Muhammad Akram, Karam Elahi Chauhan and Nasim Hasan Shah. The dissenting judges were Justices Dorab Patel, Ghulam Safdar Shah and Muhammad Haleem. The dissenting judges questioned whether the testimony of Masood Mahmood, an approver and central prosecution witness, was sufficiently reliable and corroborated to sustain Bhutto's conviction in a capital case.

After the appeal was dismissed, Bhutto's lawyers filed a review petition. The petition was ultimately rejected on 24 March 1979. Bhutto was executed in Rawalpindi Central Jail on 4 April 1979.

== Criticism ==
The case remained controversial almost from the outset. Critics argued that the trial took place in the coercive atmosphere of martial law, when fundamental rights were suspended and Bhutto's political party was under severe repression. Additional criticism focused on the decision to try the case directly in the Lahore High Court, the reported personal animosity of Chief Justice Maulvi Mushtaq toward Bhutto, the use of in camera proceedings for part of the trial, and the prosecution's reliance on approver testimony.

Justice Nasim Hasan Shah later acknowledged that it would have been better had Maulvi Mushtaq not sat on the trial bench. Over time, Bhutto's party and many lawyers came to describe the case as a judicial murder.

== 2024 Supreme Court opinion ==
In 2011, President Asif Ali Zardari filed a presidential reference under Article 186 of the Constitution asking the Supreme Court for its opinion on the Bhutto case. After years of delay, a nine-member bench headed by Chief Justice Qazi Faez Isa heard the matter and, on 6 March 2024, unanimously held that the proceedings in Bhutto's trial and appeal did not meet the constitutional requirements of fair trial and due process.

The court also stated that the Constitution and the law did not provide a mechanism to reopen and set aside the final conviction after dismissal of the review petition. In its detailed opinion issued in July 2024, the Supreme Court said that due process and fair trial had not been complied with and described the country and its courts as being captive to martial law during the relevant period.

== See also ==
- Execution of Zulfikar Ali Bhutto
- 1977 Pakistani military coup
- Muhammad Zia-ul-Haq
- Pakistan Peoples Party
