= Najib =

Najib or Najeeb (Arabic: نجيب) is an Arabic male given name. Notable people with the name include:

== Given name ==
- Najib ad-Dawlah Yousafzai (1707/08–1770), Afghan warrior who fought in the Third Battle of Panipat
- Najibullah Ahmadzai (1947–1996), Afghan communist General Secretary and Head of state
- Najibullah Zazai (born 1985), Afghan-American who planned a deadly New York attack
- Najib Amhali (born 1971), Moroccan-born Dutch stand-up comedian and actor
- Najib Ali Choudhury (19th Century), Bengali Islamic scholar
- Najib Balala (born 1967), Kenyan politician
- Nayib Bukele (born 1981), 43rd President of El Salvador
- Najib Daho (1959–1993), Moroccan-born English boxer
- Najib Farssane (born 1981), French footballer
- Najib Mikati (born 1955), former Acting President of Lebanon
- Najib Mohammad Lahassimi (born 1978), Moroccan held in Guantanamo
- Najib Naderi (born 1984), Afghan footballer
- Najib Tun Razak (born 1953), 6th Prime Minister of Malaysia and convicted criminal
- Najib-ad-din Samarqandi (died 1222), Persian physician

== Middle name ==
- Abu al-Najib al-Suhrawardi (1097–1168), Persian Sufi
- Ahmad Najib al-Hilali (1891–1958), Prime Minister of Egypt
- Ahmad Najib Aris (1976–2016), Malaysian convicted murderer and rapist
- Baraa Najib al-Ruba'i, Iraqi politician
- Muhammad Najib ar-Ruba'i (1904–1983), President of Iraq
- Philippe Najib Boulos (1902–1979), Lebanese lawyer and politician

== Najeeb ==
=== Given name ===
- Najeeb Ahmed (1963–1990), Pakistani student leader
- Najeeb Ahmed Khan (born 1933), 8 Pass Charlie; Pakistani bomber pilot
- Najeeb Amar (born 1971), Pakistan-born Hong-Kong cricketer
- Nageeb Arbeely (1861–1904), American Consul to Jerusalem, founder of the newspaper Kawkab America
- Najeeb Jung (born 1951), Indian academic administrator
- Najeeb Halaby (1915–2003), American businessman and government official
- Najeeb Qahtan Al-Sha'abi (1953–2021), Yemeni politician

== See also ==
- Naguib
