= Necip =

Necip is a Turkish given name for males. People named Necip include:

- Necip Fazıl Kısakürek (1904–1983), Turkish poet, novelist, playwright and philosopher
- Necip Hablemitoğlu (1954–2002), Turkish historian and Kemalist intellectual
- Necip Uysal (born 1991), Turkish footballer

== See also ==
- Najib, Arabic version
