= Naseem Shah (disambiguation) =

Naseem Shah (born 2003) is a Pakistani international cricketer.

Naseem Shah may also refer to:

- Nasim Hasan Shah (1929–2015), Pakistani jurist, Chief Justice of Pakistan
- Naz Shah (born 1973), British politician
