= Anwar ul Haq =

Anwar ul Haq (Arabic: انوار الحق, meaning "lights of the Truth") is a masculine given name and surname of Arabic origin. Notable people with the name include:

== Given name ==
- Anwarul Haque (1956–2017), Bangladeshi jurist
- Anwar ul-Haq Ahady (born 1951), Afghan politician
- Anwaarul Haq Chaudhary, Pakistani politician
- Anwar-ul-Haq Haqqani, Pakistani Islamic scholar
- Anwaar ul Haq Kakar (born 1971), Pakistani politician
- Anwar ul Haq Mujahid (born 1967), Afghan militant

== Surname ==
- Chaudhry Anwarul Haq (born 1970), Pakistani politician
- Md. Anwarul Haque (Bangladeshi politician) (born 1967), Bangladeshi politician
- Md Anwarul Haque (Indian politician) (1948–2016), Indian politician
- Mohammad Anwarul Haque (died 2024), Bangladeshi judge
- Sheikh Anwarul Haq (1917–1995), Pakistani jurist
