= F. S. Lodhi =

Pakistani general, politician (1931–2004)

LTG Sardar Farooq Shaukat Khan Lodi Hilal-i-Imtiaz (MI)
- فاروق شوکت خان لودھی
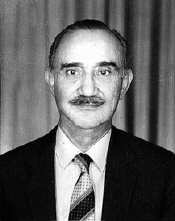

22nd Minister of Interior
- In office 22 January 1985 – 24 March 1985
- Preceded by: Mahmoud Haroon
- Succeeded by: Aslam Khattak

8th Governor of Balochistan
- In office 22 March 1984 – 7 July 1984
- Preceded by: Rahimuddin Khan
- Succeeded by: Khushdil Khan Afridi
Military commands
Corps Commander Lahore
In office March 1980 – 22 March 1984
Preceded by	Mohammad Aslam Shah
Succeeded by	Sawar Khan
Chief of General Staff
In office March 1978 – June 1980
Preceded by	Abdullah Malik
Succeeded by	Mirza Aslam Beg
Chief Instructor Pakistan Command and Staff College
In office 17 February 1975 – 8 August 1976
Preceded by	Brigadier Mohammad Ahmed
Succeeded by	Brigadier Mohammad Iqbal

Personal details
- Born: 17 June 1931 Baghdad, Mandatory Iraq
- Died: 14 September 2004 (aged 73) Karachi, Sindh, Pakistan
- Resting place: Defence Authority Graveyard, Gizri
- Spouse: Soraya Lodi
- Children: Zainab Lodi Sayeed, Fatima Lodi
- Parent(s): Sardar Mohammad Abdullah Khan Lodi (father); Jamila Khanum (mother)
- Education: St. Joseph's Higher Secondary School, Baramulla; Sri Pratap College; Pakistan Military Academy; Camberley Staff College
- Occupation: Army Officer (Lieutenant General); Author; Editor for Dawn and Outlook magazine
- Nickname: F.S Lodi

Military service
- Allegiance: Pakistan
- Branch/service: Pakistan Army
- Years of service: 1948 – 1984
- Rank: Lieutenant-General
- Unit: East Bengal Regiment
- Commands: IV Corps; CG Staff; Divisional Commander Kharian; Chief Instructor Quetta Staff College; Instructor Quetta Staff College; Brigade Commander Lahore; Battalion Commander; Regiment Commander East Pakistan
- Battles/wars: Indo-Pakistani War of 1971
- Awards: Hilal-e-Imtiaz (MI)

Farooq Shaukat Lodi (Urdu: سردار فاروق شوکت خان لودھی; 17 June 1931 – 14 September 2004), (Note: Sardar and Lodi are variously spelled such as Sardar as Sirdar and Lodi as Lodi.) better known as F.S. Lodi, was a Pakistani military officer who served as the Governor of Punjab and Balochistan in 1984, and later serving as the Interior Minister in Zia administration in 1985.

Born and raised in Iraq, Lodi served in the Pakistan Army where he saw actions against India in 1965 and 1971, and served in command and administrative position in the Pakistani military. After retiring from military, Lodi was known to be a prolific writer on military issues, particularly he wrote on topics relating to Pakistan Army.

== Early life and education ==
He was born on 17 June 1931 in Baghdad, Mandatory Iraq as Farooq Shaukat Khan Lodi to his father Sardar Mohammad Abdullah Khan Lodi, a British/Imperial civil servant who was posted in Mandatory Iraq in the British Indian Army at the department of Finance. Farooq's mother was Jamila Khanum, a woman known to be of great beauty and high status in Baghdad. The family later returned to Srinagar, Jammu and Kashmir and Farooq's father became the accountant general of the Jammu and Kashmir state.

Farooq did his schooling at St. Joseph's Higher Secondary School, Baramulla and obtained his FSC from the S. P. College in Srinagar.

== Military career ==
He was first posted to the East Bengal Regiment in East Pakistan where he later commanded an uncertain regiment. Prior to his promotion to the rank of colonel, he was sent to Staff College, Camberley by the Pakistan Army for further training. During the Indo-Pakistani War of 1971, he commanded a brigade in Lahore upon his promotion to the rank of brigadier. After conflict ended between the two countries, he was appointed as an instructor with the second assignment as a chief instructor at the Command and Staff College. He again went to the UK for professional military training.

Upon being promoted to the rank of Major General, he commanded a division in Kharian, Punjab. He later served as a divisional commander during the government of Muhammad Zia-ul-Haq. As a Major General, he was posted as Chief of General Staff from 1978 to March 1980. He was also assigned to command IV Corps with his last promotion of lieutenant general, during which he also served as governor of Punjab.

== Surviving a plane crash ==
After serving as a governor of Punjab, he was sent from Rawalpindi to Quetta with his second appointment as Governor of Balochistan in 1984. However, his Cessna aircraft crashed in a remote area and pilot Nadir Imtiaz Saigal and ADC died in the aviation accident and Lodi received minor injuries.

He was admitted to a local hospital where the doctors gave him a unnecessary blood transfusion that infected him with malaria and later hepatitis C. The infectious disease damaged his liver and he was subsequently airlifted to the Combined Military Hospital Rawalpindi where he recovered from disease, and he resumed his duties in Quetta.

== Later life ==
After retiring from the services, he moved to Karachi on the request of his wife where he spent his last days and started teaching in a law college in Karachi, and used to wrote articles for newspapers, including Dawn newspaper and Outlook magazine.

As a defence writer, he was among the others who outlined the use of the basic principles of the nuclear doctrine of Pakistan.

== Articles ==
- Lt. Gen. Sardar F. S. Lodi (Retd., Pakistan Army), Pakistan’s Nuclear Doctrine, Pakistan Defence Journal, 1999.
- "The Army's Chequered March". magazine.outlookindia.com. 1 September 1997.
