= List of Pakistani films of 1990 =

List of Pakistani films by year 1990

This is a list of films produced in Pakistan in 1990 and in the Urdu language.

== 1990 ==
Title	Director	Cast	Genre	Notes
1990
Aasmaan	Hasnain	Yusuf Khan; Nadeem Babra Sharif	Action; Drama	
Barood Ka Tohfa	Saeed Rana, Produced by Rana Tariq Masood	Hasan Hashmi, Rana Faisal (Child Star), Raeena, Jahanzeb, Raheela Agha	Action	The only Pakistani film based on Afghan War against Soviet occupation in the 1980s. The film was released on October 5, 1990
Bulandi	Javed Fazil	Nadeem, Samina Peerzada, Reema, Shaan Shahid	Romance; Drama	Debut film for Shaan and Reema. The film was released on September 21, 1990
Choron Ka Dushman		Babra, Javed Sheikh		
Daka		Shahida Minni, Ajab Gul		Also released in Punjabi language. (Double version film)
Haseena Atom Bomb		Musarrat, Badar Munir		
Insaniyat Kay Dushman	Hasnain	Anjuman, Nadeem, Neeli, Izhar Qazi, Sultan Rahi	Action; Drama	
International Guerillas		Babra, Javed, Afzaal		Also released in Punjabi language. (Double version film)
Jangjoo Gorillay		Neeli, Javed, Ajab Gul		Also released in Punjabi language. (Double version film)
Kala Pani		Babra, Qazi, Ajab Gul		Also released in Punjabi language. (Double version film)
Kali		Babra, Ismael Shah		
Leader		Kaveeta, Nadeem, Qazi		
Maa Qasm		Babra, Ismael Shah		
Miss Cleopatra		Babra, Sultan Rahi, Gullu		Also released in Punjabi language. (Double version film)
Nagina	Altaf Hussain	Reema Khan, Shaan Shahid, Madiha Shah	Music; Romance	Also released in Punjabi language. (Double version film) The film was released on October 5, 1990
Number One	Saeed Ali Khan	Salma Agha, Izhar Qazi	Drama	Also released in Punjabi language. (Double version film)
Puttar Jaggey Da	Hassan Askari	Sultan Rahi, Nadira		
Puttar Shahiye Da	Masood Butt	Yusuf Khan, Naghma, Iqbal Hassan, Mustafa Qureshi	Action	
Raja		Nadra, Nadeem, Javed		Madiha Shah's debut film, The film was also released in Punjabi language. (Double version film)
Sarmaya				
Tezab		Gori, Ismael Shah		Also released in Punjabi language. (Double version film)
Ustadon Ke Ustad		Nadeem, Babra, Javed Sheikh		
Zehreelay		Reema, Javed, Ajab		Also released in Punjabi language. (Double version film)

== See also ==
- 1990 in Pakistan
