= List of Pakistani provincial governors =

These are lists of Pakistani provincial governors.

- List of current Pakistani governors
- Governor of Balochistan, Pakistan
- Governor of East Pakistan
- Governor of Gilgit-Baltistan
- Governor of Khyber Pakhtunkhwa
- Governor of Punjab, Pakistan
- Governor of Sindh
