= Naguib =

Naguib (Arabic: نجيب Najib) is a given and family name in Egyptian Arabic, a variant of the Arabic name Najib. It may refer to the following people:

== Given name ==
- Naguib el-Rihani (1889–1949), Egyptian actor
- Naguib Kanawati (born 1941), Egyptian-Australian Egyptologist
- Naguib Mahfouz (1911–2006), Egyptian novelist
- Naguib Pasha Mahfouz (1882–1974), Egyptian doctor
- Zaki Naguib Mahmoud (1905–1993), Egyptian philosopher
- Naguib Sawiris (born 1954), Egyptian businessman

== Surname ==
- Antonios Naguib (1935–2022), Egyptian Catholic patriarch
- David Naguib Pellow (born 1969), American ethnologist
- Mohamed Naguib (1901–1984), first president of Egypt
- Mohamed Naguib Hamed (born 1962), Egyptian athlete
