= List of Pakistani films of 1979 =

A list of films produced in Pakistan in 1979 (see 1979 in film) and in the Urdu language:

== January - March ==
Opening		Title	Director	Cast	Genre	Note	Ref.
J A N	19	Behan Bhai	Nazar Shabab	Waheed Murad, Rani, Mohammad Ali, Bindiya			
F E B	2	Waaday Ki Zanjeer					
F E B	11	Maula Jatt	Yunus Malik	Sultan Rahi, Mustafa Qureshi, Aseia	Action, crime, drama, fantasy, thriller		
M A R	23	Haider Ali	Masood Parvez	Mohammad Ali, Talish	Drama		
M A R	23	Khaak Aur Khoon	Masood Parvez	Naveen Tajik, Shujaat Hashmi, Abid Ali			

== April – June ==
Opening		Title	Director	Cast	Genre	Note	Ref.
A P R	20	Pakeeza					

== July - September ==
Opening		Title	Director	Cast	Genre	Note	Ref.
J U L	13	Aurat Raj					
A U G	25	Khushboo					

== October - December ==
Opening		Title	Director	Cast	Genre	Note	Ref.
O C T	12	General Bakht Khan	Sarshar Akhtar Malik	Sultan Rahi, Neelo, Mohammad Ali, Badar Munir			

== See also ==
- 1979 in Pakistan
