= List of Pakistani films of 1978 =

A list of films produced in Pakistan in 1978 (see 1978 in film) and in the Urdu language:

== 1978 ==
| Title | Cast | Notes |
|---|---|---|
| Awaz | | Box office: |
| Shola | | |
| Parakh | | |
| Seeta Maryam Margaret | | |
| Ranga Daku | | |

== See also ==
- 1978 in Pakistan
