= Abdul Kadir Shaikh =

Pakistani politician (1926–2008)

12th Governor of Sindh
- In Governing office 6 July 1977 – 17 September 1978
- President: Muhammad Zia-ul-Haq

Personal details
- Born: 1926 Pano Akil
- Died: 27 March 2008 (aged 82) Karachi, Pakistan

Abdul Kadir Shaikh (Urdu: عبد القادر شیخ) (1926–2008) was a Pakistani jurist who served as a judge of the Supreme Court of Pakistan and the acting governor of Sindh from 6 July 1977 to 17 September 1978.

== Early life ==
Shaikh was born in 1926 in Pano Akil.

== Career ==
Shaikh began his legal career at the age of 19. He worked as an assistant public prosecutor in Sukkur before moving to Karachi, where he held positions as assistant and additional advocate-general of Sindh. In the mid-1960s, he was appointed to the West Pakistan High Court.

Shaikh became chief justice of the Sindh High Court during the imposition of martial law in 1977 and was also appointed acting Governor of Sindh, a role also assigned to chief justices of other high courts at that time. As a judge, he issued a suo motu notice when the police investigation into the Mustafa Zaidi murder case was facing severe delays amid mounting media scrutiny. The Supreme Court later overturned the notice, stating that its role in criminal cases begins after investigations are completed and a challan is submitted.

He retired from the Supreme Court in 1994. After retirement, Shaikh served as chairman of the Authority for the Preservation of Moenjodaro and as a member of the board of governors of Karachi Grammar School.
