= Sir Syed Government Girls College =

- دانش کدہَ سرسید برائے خواتین
- Type: Degree College
- Established: 1954
- Affiliations: Board of Intermediate Education Karachi and University of Karachi
- Principal: Professor Mrs. Khalida Perveen
- Academic staff: Arts Group, Science Group, Commerce Group, General Group, BCS
- Location: Karachi, Sindh, Pakistan

Sir Syed Government Girls College (Urdu: دانش کدہَ سرسید برائے خواتین) is located in Nazimabad at Karachi, Sindh, Pakistan. Sir Syed Girls College is adjacent to 1st Chowrangi, Altaf Ali Barelvi Road, Nazimabad, Karachi and is under the supervision of Government of Sindh.

== History ==
Sir Syed Government Girls College is considered as one of the most premier educational institutions for girls in Karachi. The college was founded by Syed Altaf Ali Barelvi in 1954 solely to provide higher education to girls. The college has been named as Sir Syed Girls College after the leader Sir Syed Ahmed Khan. The present building of the college was completed in 1963. In September 1972, the college was nationalised and since then named as Sir Syed Government Girls College. The death in a bus accident of its student Bushra Zaidi lead to ethnic rioting across Karachi and the rise of the Muttahida Qaumi Movement (MQM).

== Principals ==
Mrs Naseem Shah

Mrs Zaman

Mrs Amna Kamal

Ms. Amina Siddiqi

== See also ==
- Bushra Zaidi
