= Balochistan Assembly Building =

- عمارت اسمبلی بلوچستان بلوچستان اسمبلی ماڑی د بلوچستان د مجلس ودانۍ ساختمان مجلس بلوچستان
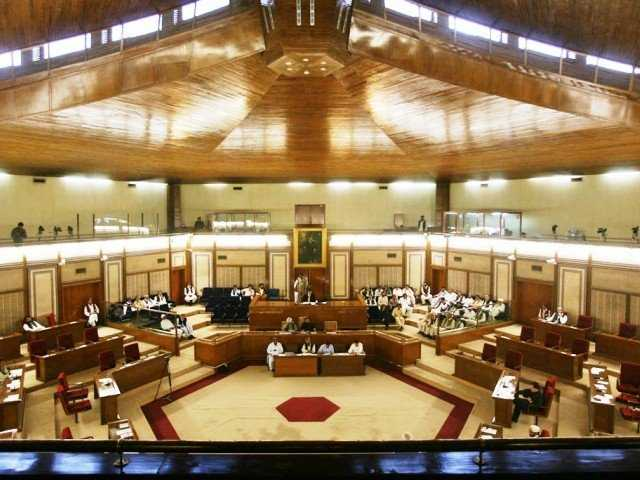
- The session chamber

General information
- Status: Functional
- Type: Heritage
- Architectural style: Balochi Gidaan
- Location: Quetta District, Quetta Division, Balochistan, Zarhgoon Road, Model Town, Quetta, Pakistan
- Coordinates: 30.2037476°N 67.0098474°E
- Current tenants: Provincial Assembly of Balochistan
- Opened: 28 April 1987 by Muhammad Khan Junejo
- Cost: Rs. 50.2 million
- Owner: Government of Balochistan

Technical details
- Floor count: 1
- Floor area: 6,075.8 m2 (65,399 sq ft)

Other information
- Seating capacity: 355

Balochistan Assembly Building in Zarhgoon Road, Quetta is the seat of the Provincial Assembly of Balochistan, the legislative body of the province.

== History ==
In 1972, Balochistan Province was formed by Pakistan after the dissolution of One Unit, and the Provincial Assembly of Balochistan was established. Initially, Shahi Jirga Hall (present-day City District Council Building) was chosen as the provincial assembly's meeting place. During the governorship of Akbar Bugti, new building for the assembly was proposed and the governor chose its design. Its groundbreaking was done by president Zia-ul-Haq and it was inaugurated on 28 April 1987 by prime minister Muhammad Khan Junejo. On 28 June 1987, its mosque was inaugurated by the president. In 2002, the assembly got its secretariat which was inaugurated by governor Amir-ul-Mulk Mengal.

In 2024, the provincial government decided to demolish the assembly building and build new building for the assembly. Speaker Abdul Khaliq Khan Achakzai confirmed that a Chinese construction firm would built the new building by 2025. The plan was strongly opposed by the opposition. Later, the provincial government's decision was challenged at Balochistan High Court, stating the decision unconstitutional as the decision process ignored the provincial cabinet and it would destroy a historical structure. In 2025, a resolution was passed in the provincial assembly to demolish the building and construct new building, showing lack of spaces. In 2026, chief minister Sarfraz Bugti announced the finalisation of the tenter for demolishing the existing assembly building. He confirmed that the new building would be built by 2028. On 4 May 2026, the High Court issued interim stay order against provincial government's tender notice for demolition as the constitutional petition was still ongoing.

== Architecture and layout ==
The assembly building looks like a Baloch tent. It is 6,075.8 m^{2} (65,399 sq ft) and has total 355 seats. It houses the debate chamber, offices for provincial ministers, speaker, deputy speaker and opposition leader. It has assembly secretariat which is divided by another block. The secretariat has 76 rooms and a conference hall, reporting room, committee room, research centre, printing, editing, and accounts offices. It also has a mosque and library.
