= Najib Farssane =

French football player (born 1981)

Personal information
- Date of birth: 11 June 1981 (age 45)
- Place of birth: Vitry-le-François, France
- Height: 1.80 m (5 ft 11 in)
- Position: Forward

Senior career*
Years	Team	Apps	(Gls)
1999–2000	Grenoble		
2000–2001	Pisa		
2001–2002	Sestrese		
2003–2004	CO Châlons		
2004–2007	Reims	17	(0)
2007–2008	SO Romorantin	33	(3)
2008–2010	Rouen	67	(17)
2010–2012	Beauvais	62	(10)
2012–2014	USL Dunkerque	66	(4)
2014–2017	Epernay		
- * Club domestic league appearances and goals

Najib Farssane (born 11 June 1981) is a French former professional footballer who played as a forward.

He played on the professional level in Ligue 2 for Stade de Reims. He also played in Italy for Pisa in Serie C1 and for Sestrese in Serie D.

At the conclusion of the 2009–10 season, it was announced that Farssane would be leaving FC Rouen to sign for National league rivals AS Beauvais.
