= Muhammad Afzal Zullah =

Pakistani judge (1928–2011)

The Honorable Muhammad Afzal Zullah محمد افضل ظلہ

11th Chief Justice of Pakistan
- In office 1 January 1990 – 18 April 1993
- Appointed by: Ghulam Ishaq Khan
- Preceded by: Mohammad Haleem
- Succeeded by: Nasim Hasan Shah

Justice of the Supreme Court of Pakistan
- In office 14 Jun 1979 – 18 April 1993
- Nominated by: Zia-ul-Haq
- Appointed by: Zia-ul-Haq

Personal details
- Born: 19 April 1928 Bijnial, British Raj (now Pakistan)
- Died: 23 December 2011 (aged 83) Lahore, Punjab, Pakistan
- Education: University of the Punjab

Supreme Court of Pakistan

Mohammed Afzal Zullah (Urdu: محمد افضل ظلہ) was a Pakistani jurist who served as the 11th Chief Justice of Pakistan. Born on April 19, 1928, in Bijnial, Mandrah, Gujar Khan, District Rawalpindi, he graduated in 1948 from the University of Punjab with a degree in arts. In 1950, he received the degree in law from Punjab University Lahore. He enrolled as a Pleader in 1950 and started practicing law in Sahiwal. Later on he shifted to Rawalpindi in 1951 and to Lahore in 1961.

He was appointed as Additional Judge of the West Pakistan High Court in May 1968, he became permanent Judge of the High Court in March 1970. He was elevated to the Supreme Court in 1979. In the same year he became member of Shariat Appellate Bench, Supreme Court of Pakistan. He became the Chairman of the Bench in 1982. He acted as the Chief Justice from March 4 to 7, 1984. Justice Zullah became the Chief Justice of Pakistan from January 1, 1990, to March 19, 1993.

He also remained a Member Syndicate, at the University of Engineering and Technology Lahore, Member Board of Studies in Law University of Multan, Member Board of Trustees Islamic University Islamabad and Member Selection Board Quaid-i-Azam University Islamabad.

== See also ==
- Chief Justices of Pakistan
- Supreme Court of Pakistan
- List of Pakistanis

Legal offices
Preceded by Mohammad Haleem	Chief Justice of Pakistan; 1990–1993	Succeeded by Nasim Hasan Shah
