= Death of Bushra Zaidi =

1985 riot-causing death in Karachi, Pakistan

Bushra Zaidi (Urdu: بشریٰ زیدی) was a 20-year-old girl whose death in a traffic accident on 15 April 1985 started riots in Karachi, Sindh, Pakistan. Bushra, a 20-year-old Muhajir student of Sir Syed College, died after being struck by a bus driver. The driver was a Punjabi speaker from AJK,but rumour spread that driver was Pashtun. Her death immediately lead to ethnic riots which eventually gave rise to the Muttahida Qaumi Movement (MQM).

== Incident ==
Zaidi was killed by a bus in a traffic accident on 15 April 1985 and this was a significant turning point in the history of Karachi. Bushra, a 20-year-old student at Sir Syed Girls College, lost her life in a traffic accident on Nawab Siddiq Ali Khan Road. She was killed after she was hit by a bus while crossing the road. Her sister, Najma, who was with her during the accident, suffered serious injuries, including a fractured leg.

== Riots ==
News of Zaidi's death triggered widespread protests and riots across Karachi in the days after the accident. Outraged students, joined by female protesters from nearby colleges, gathered at Golimaar Chowrangi to express their anger and frustration which turned to violence. The situation quickly escalated as property was attacked and vehicles were burned and rioting spread to other areas of the city, resulting in violence and arson. The protests quickly took took an ethnic turn, as Muhajir rioters attacked members of various communities residing in the city leading to clashes between the Muhajir and Pashtun ethnic groups. These riots gave rise the next year in 1986 to the Muhajir nationalist Muttahida Qaumi Movement (MQM), the dominant political party of Karachi for the next three decades.
