= Hawke's Bay case =

1983 mass hysteria by Shia Muslims in Karachi

The Hawke's Bay case was an incident of religiously motivated mass hysteria that occurred in late February 1983 in Hawke's Bay Beach, Karachi. This event, involving members of the Shia community, resulted in 18 casualties and a similar number of injuries.

== Incident ==
The incident occurred when 38 Shias from a village in Chakwal Tehsil headed into the Arabian Sea led by Naseem Fatima (alternately, Nasreen Fatima). She claimed to have direct contact with the 12th Shia Imam Muhammad al-Mahdi, and was a self-proclaimed miracle worker, despite her lack of wearing the customary Muslim hijab (veil). She was supported by her father, Willayet Shah, who had returned from Saudi Arabia, after working there for several years, during which his Shia faith was strengthened following Khomeini's success in the Iranian Revolution. Naseem Fatima claimed that the Mahdi told her to go to the Arabian Sea, where its waters would part and allow her and her followers to walk to Basra and finally to the Shia holy cities of Najaf and Karbala – both in Iraq – without having to pay for the journey. She also claimed that the Mahdi told her to place the women and children in locked trunks for the journey, which the men then carried. However, most pilgrims who took part drowned (including Fatima), after the Karachi police arrived too late to save them. Those who did survive were arrested for attempting to leave Pakistan without proper travel documents.

== Reactions ==
The event was highly praised by Shias, but ridiculed by Sunnis as 'insanity'. It also inspired two chapters of Salman Rushdie's book The Satanic Verses.

The Shias, by contrast, viewed the event as a validation of their faith. They claimed that only the Shiites were capable of such deep devotion and sacrifice. It was, undeniably, an instance embedded in Shia mythology, which predisposed the community to both respond to and enact the drama.

== Aftermath ==
The surviving pilgrims were able to eventually reach Karbala after their airfares were paid for by wealthy Shias. This was seen as fulfilling the prophecy that they would travel to their desired destination free of charge.
