= Ameer Khan (Pakistani cricketer) =

Pakistani cricketer (born 1982)

Ameer Khan (born 18 December 1982 in Islamabad), is a former first-class cricketer who has represented Chittagong Division. He made 42 first-class appearances from 2000–01 to 2011–12.
