= Najeeb Ahmed =

Pakistani student activist and murder victim (1963–1990)

Syed Najeeb Ahmed (17 November 1963 – 11 April 1990), also known as Quaid-e-Talba ('Leader of students'), was a Pakistani leftist student activist who was murdered in 1990.

Born to a Muhajir family in Karachi, Ahmed was a leader of the People Students' Federation (PSF), the student wing of Pakistan People's Party, in Karachi and president of PSF, Karachi division. He is dubbed the "iron man" of the PSF.

At University of Karachi, Najeeb Ahmed had a few scuffles with policemen posted at the university. He then led PSF into a number of clashes with APMSO the student wing of MQM, before being arrested. Najeeb Ahmed had been leading PSF at the university since 1986, by 1988 he had emerged as the student organisation's top man in Karachi.

In Karachi Najeeb Ahmed was popularly acclaimed as the Quaid-e-Talba ('Leader of students') and has become a symbol of bravery for PSF activists all over Pakistan.

== Assassination ==
On 6 April 1990, Najeeb Ahmed was shot by unknown terrorists in the Hyderi Market area of North Nazimabad. He died a few days later at a hospital. He had some issues with PPP leader Qaim Ali Shah.

Due to the violence no student union elections were held in 1990 in Karachi and the rest of Sindh.

== See also ==
- Benazir Bhutto
- Pakistan People's Party
