= Fakhruddin G. Ebrahim =

Pakistani judge (1928–2020)

The Honourable Justice Fakhruddin G. Ebrahim
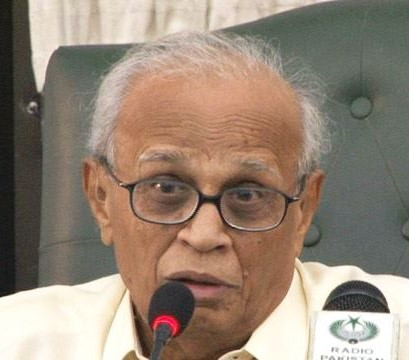

Chief Election Commissioner
- In office 9 July 2012 – 31 July 2013

18th Governor of Sindh
- In office 19 April 1989 – 6 August 1990
- President: Ghulam Ishaq Khan
- Prime Minister: Benazir Bhutto
- Preceded by: Qadeeruddin Ahmed
- Succeeded by: Mahmoud Haroon

2nd Attorney General of Pakistan
- In office 20 December 1971 – 5 July 1977
- President: Zulfikar Ali Bhutto; Fazal Ilahi Chaudhry
- Prime Minister: Zulfikar Ali Bhutto
- Deputy: Yahya Bakhtiar
- Preceded by: Syed Sharifuddin Pirzada
- Succeeded by: Syed Sharifuddin Pirzada

Personal details
- Born: 12 February 1928 Ahmedabad, Bombay Presidency, British India
- Died: 7 January 2020 (aged 91) Karachi, Pakistan
- Citizenship: Pakistani
- Education: Gujarat Vidyapith; Sindh Muslim Law College
- Cabinet: Benazir Bhutto Government; Zulfikar Ali Bhutto Government

Fakhruddin G. Ebrahim, TI (Urdu: فخر الدين جى ابراهيم 12 February 1928 – 7 January 2020) was a Pakistani retired judge, legal expert and senior lawyer. He was appointed as the 24th Chief Election Commissioner of Pakistan on 14 July 2012, oversaw the 2013 election, and served until he resigned on 31 July 2013.

Ebrahim was born in 1928 in Dhrol, Gujrat, Bombay Presidency, British India to a Dawoodi Bohra family. In 1945, he attended the Bombay University where he earned his LLB with distinctions in 1949. In 1950, Ebrahim moved to Pakistan and taught Interpretation of Statutes at the Sindh Muslim Law College. In early 1950s, Ebrahim established his own firm and in 1971, Zulfikar Ali Bhutto appointed him as a Judge of the High Court of Sindh and Baluchistan.

He served as the interim Justice Minister from 5 November 1996 until 17 February 1997. Ebrahim was a retired Associate Judge of the Supreme Court of Pakistan, and Senior Advocate Supreme Court and was known also as a peace activist. In 1988, he was also Governor of Sindh, appointed by Prime Minister Benazir Bhutto during her first term.

In March 1981, serving as an ad hoc Judge of the Supreme Court of Pakistan, he refused to take a fresh oath, under the Provisional Constitutional Order (PCO) promulgated by General Zia-ul-Haq along with Justice Dorab Patel and Chief Justice Sheikh Anwarul Haq. The PCO not only negated the independence of the judiciary but also prolonged martial law by nullifying the effect of a judgement giving General Zia's regime limited recognition.

Ebrahim established the Citizen Police Liaison Committee (CPLC) in 1989. The CPLC works in Karachi and assists citizens in registering the First Information Report if it is refused by police for some reason. Ebrahim headed the law firm of Fakhruddin G. Ebrahim & Company, a general legal practice originally established in Bombay (now Mumbai), India. The firm relocated to Karachi in 1951.

Ebrahim had long-standing ties with the Pakistan Cricket Board (PCB). In 1995, the PCB initiated an inquiry, under the chairmanship of Ebrahim, to look into allegations made by Australian players Shane Warne and Mark Waugh surrounding the First Test between Pakistan and Australia in Karachi in 1994 and the ODI in Rawalpindi. The Australian cricketers had accused Saleem Malik of offering them bribes which they rejected. The inquiry was frustrated as the Australian players did not travel to Pakistan to give evidence, and thus the Inquiry had to rely on their statements together with the cross-examination of Saleem Malik. In October 1995, it was decided that the allegations were unfounded. In December 2006, Ebrahim also served as the Chairman of the PCB's Anti-doping Appeals Committee, which acquitted Shoaib Akhtar and Mohammad Asif. Ebrahim was in favour of the acquittal. He died on 7 January 2020 In Karachi, Pakistan.

Political offices
Preceded by Qadeeruddin Ahmed	Governor of Sindh; 1989–1990	Succeeded by Mahmoud Haroon
