= Jahandad Khan (general) =

Pakistani general

Jahandad Khan جہانداد خان HI(M) SBt

14th Governor of Sindh
- In office 7 April 1984 – 4 January 1987
- President: Muhammad Zia-ul-Haq
- Prime Minister: Muhammad Khan Junejo
- Preceded by: S.M. Abbasi
- Succeeded by: Ashraf W. Tabani

Founder President Al-Shifa Trust
- In office 1985–2011

Personal details
- Born: April 1, 1929 Malhoo
- Died: February 13, 2011 (aged 81) Rawalpindi
- Awards: Hilal-e-Imtiaz (Civilian); Hilal-e-Imtiaz (Military); Sitara-e-Basalat

Military service
- Allegiance: Pakistan
- Branch/service: Pakistan Army
- Years of service: 1950–1984
- Rank: Lieutenant-General

Jahandad Khan HI(M) SBt (Urdu: جہانداد خان, 1929 – 2011) was a Pakistani military officer who served as the 14th Governor of Sindh. He was founder of Al-Shifa Trust. Jahandad Khan also served as chairman of the Pakistan Red Crescent Society.

== Career ==
=== Military ===
Jahan Dad Khan passed out from Pakistan Military Academy Kakul on 4 February 1950 with the 1st PMA Long Course and commissioned in the Regiment of Artillery. He went through normal command, staff and instructional assignments during his military career. He retired in 1984 as lieutenant-general after 34 years of service.

== Bibliography ==
- Pakistan Leadership Challenges (2001)
- Depart with a Smile (2005)

== Awards and decorations ==
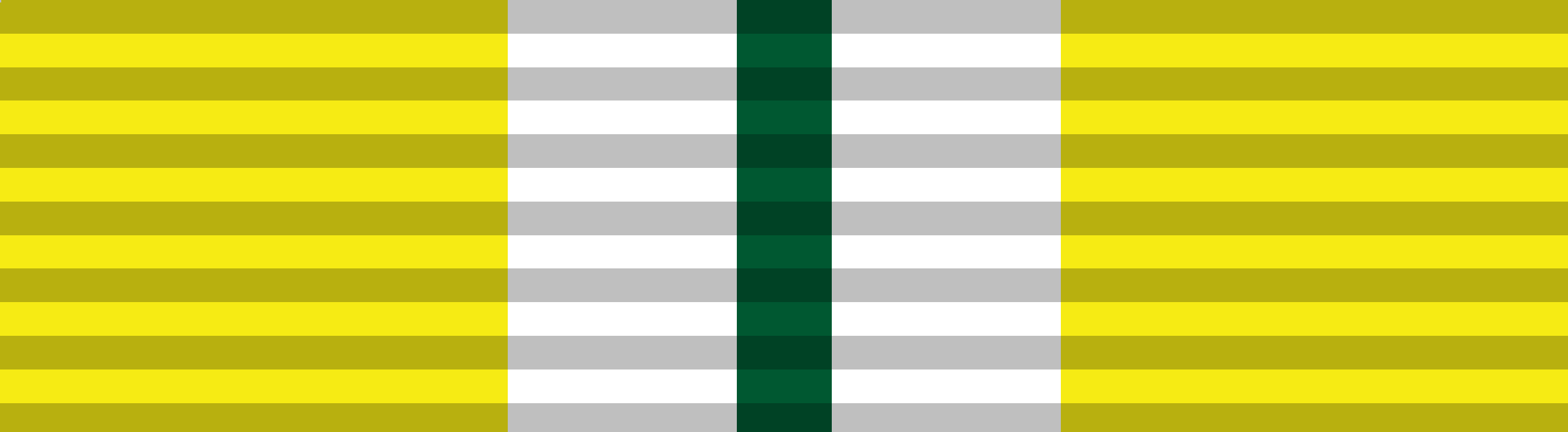

Hilal-i-Imtiaz (Civilian) (Crescent of Excellence)	Hilal-i-Imtiaz (Military) (Crescent of Excellence)		Sitara-e-Basalat (Star of Valour)
Sitara-e-Harb 1965 War (War Star 1965)	Sitara-e-Harb 1971 War (War Star 1971)	Tamgha-e-Jang 1965 War (War Medal 1965)	Tamgha-e-Jang 1971 War (War Medal 1971)
Pakistan Medal (Pakistan Tamgha) 1947	Tamgha-e-Sad Saala Jashan-e-Wiladat-e-Quaid-e-Azam (100th Birth Anniversary of Muhammad Ali Jinnah) 1976	Tamgha-e-Qayam-e-Jamhuria (Republic Commemoration Medal) 1956	Hijri Tamgha (Hijri Medal) 1979

== Notes ==
Political offices
Preceded by S.M. Abbasi	Governor of Sindh; 1984 – 1987	Succeeded by Ashraf W. Tabani
