= Execution of Zulfikar Ali Bhutto =

1979 execution of former prime minister of Pakistan

- Part of the aftermath of the 1977 Pakistani military coup
- Date: 4 April 1979; 47 years ago
- Venue: Rawalpindi Central Jail, Rawalpindi, Pakistan

Zulfikar Ali Bhutto, the former prime minister and president of Pakistan, was executed on 4 April 1979. Bhutto was sentenced to death by hanging after being convicted in the murder case arising from a 1974 shooting in Lahore in which opposition politician Ahmad Raza Kasuri survived and his father, Nawab Mohammad Ahmad Khan Kasuri, was killed. The Supreme Court of Pakistan upheld the sentence by a 4–3 majority in February 1979, and a review petition was dismissed in March.

The execution was carried out in secrecy at Rawalpindi jail in the early hours of 4 April, after President Muhammad Zia-ul-Haq rejected domestic and international appeals for clemency. His body was flown to Sindh and buried the same day at the family graveyard in Garhi Khuda Bakhsh. The hanging remained one of the most controversial acts in Pakistani political and judicial history. In March 2024, the Supreme Court opined that Bhutto had not received a fair trial and that due process requirements had not been met.

== Background ==
Bhutto was overthrown by General Muhammad Zia-ul-Haq in the military coup of 5 July 1977 and was later tried in the Lahore High Court over the killing of Nawab Mohammad Ahmad Khan Kasuri, the father of Ahmad Raza Kasuri, a former ally who had become one of Bhutto's critics. On 18 March 1978, the Lahore High Court sentenced Bhutto to death. On 6 February 1979, the Supreme Court upheld the sentence by a 4–3 majority, and on 24 March 1979 it dismissed Bhutto's review petition.

In the final weeks before the hanging, appeals for clemency were made by foreign leaders including U.S. President Jimmy Carter, Soviet leader Leonid Brezhnev, British Prime Minister James Callaghan and Pope John Paul II. Zia nonetheless allowed the death sentence to be carried out.

== Execution ==
=== Time and place ===
According to the official Interior Ministry press note, Bhutto was hanged at 2:00 a.m. on 4 April 1979 in the Rawalpindi District Jail. The execution had been moved forward from the usual 6:00 a.m. hour so that Bhutto could be buried before the news became public.

=== Proceedings ===
Bhutto was informed of the execution warrant on the evening of 3 April. He objected that the warrant should have been read to him 24 hours in advance, asked to see the black warrant, and was given writing materials to prepare a will. He reportedly drank coffee during the evening, shaved before midnight, and attempted to write before burning the papers he had prepared.

After 1:35 a.m. officials entered his cell and asked whether he wished to walk to the gallows or be carried; he did not respond and was placed on a stretcher. On the scaffold, the executioner Tara Masih placed a hood over Bhutto's head, and the lever was pulled at 2:04 a.m. After about half an hour, a doctor certified him dead.

== Burial ==
After the execution, Bhutto's body was washed, placed in a coffin and taken to Chaklala Airbase. The body was flown from Rawalpindi in a special aircraft and handed over to family elders, who buried him after funeral prayers in the ancestral graveyard at Garhi Khuda Bakhsh near Naudero at about 10:30 a.m. The burial was attended by relatives, including two of Bhutto's uncles and his first wife, Shirin Amir Begum.

== Reaction ==
The secrecy and manner of the execution drew strong criticism at home and abroad. Time described the response as one of "shock and dismay" and noted that the Pakistani authorities had ringed the prison with armed police and detained journalists in an effort to prevent unrest.

Despite martial law restrictions, protests were reported after the execution. Time wrote that thousands attended a prayer meeting in Rawalpindi and later clashed with police, while stone-throwing incidents were reported in Lahore. For supporters of Bhutto and the Pakistan Peoples Party, the hanging became a foundational political grievance and a symbol of military interference in civilian politics.

== Legality and legacy ==
For decades, lawyers, historians and political figures described the case as an instance of judicial murder. On 6 March 2024, in response to a presidential reference filed in 2011, a nine-member bench of the Supreme Court of Pakistan unanimously held that the requirements of fair trial and due process had not been complied with in Bhutto's murder trial and appeal. In its detailed judgment issued in July 2024, the court said that the proceedings before the Lahore High Court and the Supreme Court did not meet the constitutional requirements of due process and fair trial.

Bhutto remains the only former prime minister of Pakistan to have been executed.

== See also ==
- 1977 Pakistani military coup
- Muhammad Zia-ul-Haq
- Pakistan Peoples Party
- Supreme Court of Pakistan
