= Nasim Hasan Shah =

Pakistani judge (1929–2015)

Nasim Hasan Shah نسیم حسن شاہ

12th Chief Justice of Pakistan
- In office 18 April 1993 – 14 April 1994
- Appointed by: Ghulam Ishaq Khan
- Preceded by: Muhammad Afzal Zullah
- Succeeded by: Saad Saud Jan (Acting)(1994); Syed Sajjad Ali Shah

Personal details
- Born: 15 April 1929 Lahore, Punjab Province, British India (now in Pakistan)
- Died: 3 February 2015 (aged 85) Lahore, Pakistan
- Education: Government College University, Lahore; University of the Punjab; University of Paris; Hague Academy of International Law

Supreme Court of Pakistan

Nasim Hasan Shah (Urdu: نسیم حسن شاہ; 15 April 1929 – 3 February 2015) was a Pakistani jurist who served as the chief justice of Pakistan. He is best known for his role in the verdict against Zulfiqar Ali Bhutto, the first democratically elected prime minister of Pakistan, which resulted in the death penalty.

His other notable verdict was restoration of the parliament of Pakistan dissolved by then president Ghulam Ishaq Khan. The Supreme Court held that the dissolution order was based on an incorrect appreciation of the role assigned to the president and of the powers vested in him by the constitution. It observed that the prime minister was not answerable to the president, and that the president was obliged to act on the prime minister's advice, except where the constitution allowed discretionary powers to the president.

Shah served as the chief justice of the Supreme Court of Pakistan from 17 April 1993 to 14 April 1994. He was appointed a High Court judge at the age of 39, and retired from Supreme Court at 65, the longest tenure by any judge in the history of the Indian subcontinent. Retired justice Asif Saeed Khosa is his son-in-law.

== Education ==
Nasim Hasan Shah was born in Lahore to Syed Mohsin Shah, an eminent advocate and political activist.

- Early schooling Cathedral School Lahore: 1933 to 1941 Central Model School, Lahore passing Matriculation in FIRST Division
- Joined Government College, Lahore in 1943 graduating from it in 1947. Awarded: Academic Roll of Honor
- Bachelor of Laws (LL.B) from University of the Punjab, 1949 (FIRST Class)
- Master in Arts (M.A.) in Political Science, Government College, 1951 (FIRST Class First)
- Doctorate in Jurisprudence "Docteur-en-droit" with mention "Tres Bien" from University of Paris (Sorbonne)
- Doctorate in Political Science:“Institute Des Hautes Etudes Internationales” (FIRST Position) from University of Paris, 1954
- Diploma of The Hague Academy of International Law, 1954
- Harvard University International Law Seminar, 1957

== Distinctions ==
- Named "Man of the Decade" for services to Democracy and Rule of Law by the American Pakistan Alliance, Washington D.C. 26 September 1993
- Nasim Hassan Shah helped Advocate General of Pakistan Fayyaz Ali argue in the case Maulvi Tamizuddin Khan case, where he was on the side of the government that demanded that the constituent assembly dismissed by Malik Ghulam Muhammad stay dismissed. The judgement in favour of the dismissal laid the pathway for Pakistan's slide towards dictatorship under General Ayub Khan.
- Named as one of Pakistan's nominees on the Permanent Court of Arbitration at The Hague in 1959 and continued until 1977
- Worked as Editor Supreme Court Reports from 1960 to 1963
- Elected as Member of the West Pakistan Bar Council in 1964 and of the Pakistan Bar Council in 1966
- Elevated as Judge of the High Court of West Pakistan on 11 March 1968
- Appointed Judge (ad hoc) Supreme Court of Pakistan on 18 May 1977 being the YOUNGEST in history of the Supreme Court of Pakistan. Made permanent Judge of the Supreme Court on 14 June 1979
- Elected President SAARCLAW (Pakistan) January 1992 and President SAARCLAW for entire Saarc Region (1993–1995), Patron Saarc Law: 1997
- President of B.C.C.P. 1992 to 1994
- Appointed Chief Justice of Pakistan and chairman Pakistan Law Commission on 26 April 1993.
- Elected President “Markazzia Majilis-i-Iqbal” (The Central Iqbal Committee): 21 April 1994
- Elected President “Quaid-e-Azam Forum” 3 June 1994
- Elected chairman Electric Power Forum, 1996
- Elected President Old Ravians Association, 1997
- Appointed Visiting Professor at the Kulliyah of Laws, International Islamic University Malaysia to deliver a course of lectures on the Islamisation of Laws in Pakistan (1997)
- Designated Founding Chairman of The Citizens Media Commission, 1998
- Elected President of Anjuman-i-Himayat-i-Islam (Association for the Service of Islam),1998

== Bhutto case controversy ==
Perhaps the only time in Pakistan's judicial history that a petition against a former Chief Justice of Supreme Court of Pakistan was filed, seeking registration of a case against him on charges of abetting in the "murder" of former Prime Minister Zulfikar Ali Bhutto. A division bench comprising Justices Sheikh Abdur Rashid and Bilal Khan held that the petition hardly qualified for processing because the judge of a bench could not be proceeded against in a case which had already been decided.

The members of the bench felt that petitioner Hanif Tahir of the People's Lawyers Forum (PLF) was hardly prepared to address legal aspects of the case and questions arising out of the petition. Instead, he was agitating legal points in a political manner.

One member of the bench remarked;

In a situation where the judgment of a case was effective for citation as a reference, an ambiguous statement of one of the members of a panel of judges hearing the case, could in no way prejudice the decision after two decades. If such things were allowed to happen, the whole judicial system would collapse.

The petitioner Hanif Tahir had quoted the former chief justice as saying in two of his press interviews that the Supreme Court judgment in the appeal of the late Bhutto against his death sentence awarded by the Lahore High Court was a wrong decision and it was a fit case for lesser punishment.

The petitioner submitted that Shah was part of the 7-member bench of the Supreme Court which upheld the death penalty. He contended that comments of the former chief justice amounted to a confessional statement and that he had shown no such sentiments while agreeing with the majority opinion of apex court's bench which confirmed the execution of Bhutto.

When the proceedings began, the petitioner requested the court that a larger bench be constituted to hear the case which was of paramount importance. Rejecting the request, the court informed Tahir that petitions seeking registration of FIRs were usually heard by a single bench. It was because of the nature of case that the chief justice had constituted a division bench.

Later, the petitioner requested for time to collect evidence and sought an adjournment. The court refused to do so and directed him to argue his case as he should have gathered evidence before coming to the court.

The petitioner started with quotes from the interview of Shah. The court asked him if such quotes, taken from a television interview, carried any legal significance. When the petitioner submitted that the text of interview was a "public document", the court asked the lawyer to define the legality of public documents and remarked that points raised in the petition were based on hearsay.

As for petitioner's contention that Shah had made a confessional statement in his interview, the court directed him to examine the relevant law to know what a confessional statement was and if it carried a legal weight if given on a non-judicial or extrajudicial forum. He must also differentiate between a press statement and a legal statement recorded in a court of law. The bench of the Lahore High Court on 12 February 2004 dismissed in limina.

On 25 February 2010, President Asif Ali Zardari said in Quetta: "I believe former Justice Naseem Hassan Shah as the murderer of Zulfikar Ali Bhutto."

== Public service record ==
=== Pakistan Cricket Board President ===
Shah remained president of the Board between 1993 and 1994 and during his tenure an ad hoc committee was placed on the Karachi City Cricket Association (KCCA) whose affiliation with the board had been suspended after the shock confession in a television interview, Nasim Hasan Shah, a member of the Supreme Court bench which rejected Zulfikar Ali Bhutto's appeal, that he had joined the rejectionists under pressure. The decision led to the execution of Zulfikar Ali Bhutto.

=== The Citizen's Media Commission of Pakistan ===
Nasim Hasan Shah was the founding chairman of the Citizen's Media Commission of Pakistan.

=== Markazzia Majilis-i-Iqbal (the Central Iqbal Committee) ===
Shah was elected president of the Central Iqbal Committee following his time as chief justice of the Supreme Court

== Published works ==
- Constitution, Law and Pakistan Affairs (1986) ISBN 0-19-577469-8
- Law, Justice and Islam (1989)
- Judgement on the Constitution, Rule of Law and Martial Law in Pakistan (1993) ISBN 0-19-577469-8
- Constitution, Law and Pakistan Legal System (1999)
- Memoirs and Reflections ISBN 969-516-076-X

== See also ==
- Chief Justices of Pakistan
- Supreme Court of Pakistan
- List of Kashmiris
- List of Pakistanis

Legal offices
Preceded by Muhammad Afzal Zullah	Chief Justice of Pakistan; 1993–1994	Succeeded by Saad Saud Jan; Acting
