= Qadeeruddin Ahmed =

Pakistani politician

- قدیر الدین احمد

Chief Justice of West Pakistan High Court

Chief Justice of Sindh High Court

Judge of the Supreme Court of Pakistan

Governor of Sindh Province
- In office 1988–1989
- Preceded by: Rahimuddin Khan
- Succeeded by: Fakhruddin G. Ebrahim

Personal details
- Born: 1909 Delhi, India
- Died: 23 March 1995 (aged 85–86)
- Children: 7
- Education: St. Stephen's College, Delhi

Qadeeruddin Ahmed (Urdu: قدیر الدین احمد; 1909 – 23 March 1995) was a Pakistani jurist who served as Chief Justice of West Pakistan High Court, Chief Justice of Sindh High Court, and as a judge of the Supreme Court of Pakistan.

== Life ==
He was born in 1909 in Delhi, British India and died on 23 March 1995. He was married to Begum Noorjehan (b. 1920), with whom he had five daughters (Anjum, Raana, Talat, Ayesha, and Azra) and two sons (Meraj and Zafar).

Justice Qadeeruddin remained the Chief Justice of the West Pakistan High Court until the end of the One Unit. Subsequently, he became the Chief Justice of Sindh High Court and remained in that position until his retirement in 1971. He also served as a judge of the Supreme Court of Pakistan for some time.

A number of famous cases were decided during his tenure as the Chief Justice of West Pakistan and Sindh High Courts.

Justice Qadeeruddin acquired his college education from St. Stephen's College, Delhi.

Justice Qadeeruddin also spent a few years in Hyderabad Deccan prior to the creation of Pakistan. A number of his family members were settled in Hyderabad State although their family came from UP.

He served as the Governor of Sindh from 1988-89.

He also wrote many papers and books on important national issues. One of the key issues on which he wrote was the concept of "riba" (usury) according to the Qur'anic dictates. His views on the subject were disputed by a number of scholars.

== Publications ==
Ahmed's publications include:

- What is Riba? article published in Journal of Islamic Banking and Finance (1995) Vol. 12, No. 1, pp. 7–49.
- The Demand of a Muslim Homeland, Dawn newspaper, 23.3.1992
- Islam in Our Lives book published by Royal Book Company, Karachi, 1989, 198pp.

== See also ==
- List of Pakistanis
- Sindh High Court
- West Pakistan High Court

== Footnotes ==
Political offices
Preceded by Gen (R) Rahimuddin Khan	Governor of Sindh; 1988–1989	Succeeded by Fakhruddin G. Ebrahim
