= West Pakistan High Court =

High Court based on West Pakistan

The High Court of West Pakistan was the high court for the province of West Pakistan during the existence of One Unit, from 1956 to 1971, until the separation of East Pakistan.

== History ==
On 30 September 1955, the Constituent Assembly of Pakistan passed the Establishment of West Pakistan Act, 1955. By Section 7 of the Establishment of West Pakistan Act, 1955, the Governor-General of Pakistan was invested with the power to establish, by Order, a High Court for the Province of West Pakistan to replace the Lahore High Court.

The High Court of West Pakistan (Establishment) Order XIX of 1955, (which came into force on 14 October 1955) established the legal foundation for the High Court of West Pakistan and provided for various matters in relation to its jurisdiction and powers. The Order inter alia provided that the new High Court of West Pakistan would have such Original, Appellate and other jurisdiction and such powers and authority in respect of the territories included in the Province of West Pakistan as the High Court of Judicature at Lahore had immediately before the commencement of that Order.

== Appointment of Judges ==
By virtue of Article 6 of the High Court of West Pakistan (Establishment) Order, 1955, read with Section 7 of the Establishment of West Pakistan Act, 1955, Judges of the Chief Court of Sind and the Judicial Commissioners' Court at Peshawar became Judges of the High Court of West Pakistan, entitled to terms and conditions of service, not less favourable than those to which they were entitled as Judge of the High Courts from which they were transferred. Persons who were immediately before the date of the establishment of the High Court of West Pakistan serving as temporary or additional Judges became, on the interacting day, temporary or additional Judges, as the case may be of the High Court of West Pakistan.

== Functioning ==
The 1956 Constitution provided for a High Court for each of the two Provinces and declared that the existing High Court for the Provinces of East Bengal and West Pakistan functioning before the Constitution Day would be deemed to be High Courts, under the Constitution, for the Provinces of East Pakistan and West Pakistan respectively. Under the Constitution, both the Provincial High Courts retained the jurisdiction and powers as were exercisable by them immediately before the Constitution Day. Likewise, persons holding office as Chief Justice and Judges of the two Provincial High Courts, continued to retain their offices on the same terms and conditions as to remuneration and other privileges as were applicable to them immediately before the Constitution Day.

As previously provided in the Government of India Act 1935, the new Constitution declared the two Provincial High Courts to be Courts of Record and provided for the appointment of permanent and acting judges by the President of Pakistan (instead of the Governor-General), for their holding of the office during good behaviour and for their retirement at the age of 60. Unfortunately, the new Constitution did not provide for the appointment of temporary additional judges to any of the two High Courts.

The qualification for appointment of persons as Judges of the said High Courts were altered. Pakistani Citizenship was made a pre-requisite. The bifurcation previously created between barristers and pleaders was removed and both were grouped into one compartment for eligibility, namely, advocates or defendants having at least ten years' standing in both or either of High Courts. The qualifying period of five years service previously laid down for persons holding judicial officers in British India not inferior to that of a subordinated Judge, or judge of a Small Cause Court, was raised to ten, but the enumeration describing the two particular types of judicial offices to be held was removed. The appointment of all judges by the President was made conditional on the President first seeking advice from the Chief Justice of Pakistan, the Governor General of Province to which the appointment related and where the appointment was out that of the Province to which the appointment related and where the appointment was not that of the Chief Justice, the Chief Justice of the High Court of that Province. The Constitution also gave the President the power to transfer a Judges of a High Court from one High Court to the other High Court after securing the Judges's consent and after consultation with the Chief Justice of Pakistan and the Chief Justice of the Court of which the proposed transferee was a Judge.

== Jurisdiction ==
The two High Courts were given power, throughout the territories in which they exercised jurisdiction, to issue to any person or authority (including the government directions, orders or writs (including writs in the nature of habeas corpus, mandamus, prohibition, quo warranto and certiorari) for the enforcement of all or any of the Fundamental Rights contained in Part II of the Constitution and for any other purpose generally.

== Chief Justices of West Pakistan High Court ==
- S. A. Rahman (1955–1958)
- M. R. Kayani (1958–1962)
- Manzur Qadir (1962–1963)
- Abdul Aziz Khan (1963–1965)
- Inamullah Khan (1965–1967)
- Waheed-ud-Din Ahmad (1967–1969)
- Qadeeruddin Ahmed (1969–1970)
