= Sheikh Anwarul Haq =

Pakistani judge (1917–1995)

- شیخ انوار الحق

9th Chief Justice of Pakistan
- In office 23 September 1977 – 25 March 1981
- Nominated by: Zulfikar Ali Bhutto
- Appointed by: Fazal Ilahi Chaudhry
- Preceded by: Yaqub Ali
- Succeeded by: Mohammad Haleem

Acting President of Pakistan
- In office 20 April 1978 – 7 May 1978
- Preceded by: Fazlul Qadir Chaudhry (29 November 1963 – 12 June 1965)
- Succeeded by: Wasim Sajjad (18 July 1993 – 14 November 1993)

Senior Justice of the Supreme Court of Pakistan
- In office 16 October 1972 – 23 September 1977
- Nominated by: Zulfikar Ali Bhutto

Personal details
- Born: Sheikh Anwarul Haq; 11 May 1917 Jullundur, Punjab, British India
- Died: 3 March 1995 (aged 77) Lahore, Punjab, Pakistan
- Education: Punjab University
- Profession: Jurist

Sheikh Anwarul Haq (Punjabi and Urdu: شیخ انوار الحق; 11 May 1917 – 3 March 1995), was a Pakistani jurist and academic who served as the 9th Chief Justice of Pakistan from 23 September 1977 until resigning on 25 March 1981. He signed the death warrant for former Prime Minister Zulfikar Ali Bhutto in a controversial murder case. Bhutto was executed on 4 April 1979.

Educated as an economist at the DAV College and the Punjab University in Lahore, he served as a civil servant of the Indian Civil Service as an appointee to lead the municipal governance in the British India in 1944. He continued serving in the civil service after the independence of Pakistan as a result of partition of British India in 1947 and subsequently elevated as a judge in the Sindh High Court in 1957. In 1962, Haq was nominated to serve on the Supreme Court and later appointed as Chief Justice of Lahore High Court in 1970 before his reappointment as a Senior Justice of the Supreme Court of Pakistan in 1971. He 1972, he earned public and international notability when he co-chaired the War Enquiry Commission with Chief Justice Hamoodur Rahman to investigate the economic and military collapse of Pakistan in a war against India in 1971 that led to the separation of East Pakistan as Bangladesh.

Haq was known for his judicial conservative philosophical leanings and is noted in country's political history for providing legality for the martial law upheld by chief of army staff General Zia-ul-Haq to restore law and order, in light of doctrine of necessity, as part of his conservative leanings. He also heard the case of Zulfikar Ali Bhutto as Chief Justice of the Supreme Court of Pakistan and constituted a 7-member (7 supreme court judges) bench to decide on the appeal of the capital sentence by the Lahore High Court for authorizing the death sentence of the ex-Prime Minister of Pakistan.

After the death sentence of Zulfiqar Ali Bhutto, who was convicted of murdering through proxy the father of one of his political opponents, Anwarul Haq took up the case against General Zia-ul-Haq's breaking his promise of holding elections. General Zia-ul-Haq introduced the PCO to legitimise his rule to by-pass the issues presented with this case and asked all the judges to sign an agreement accepting the PCO. Haq refused to take an oath under the imposed PCO, resigning on conscientious grounds. Anwarul Haq mobilised other like minded judges in the Supreme Court and High Courts to reject the proposed PCO by not signing the PCO. He was removed as Chief Justice of the Supreme Court of Pakistan due to his refusal to sign the PCO.

== Biography ==
=== Early life and public service ===
Sheikh Anwarul Haq was born in Jullunder, Punjab, British India on 11 May 1917, to a Punjabi family. He earned early education from Jullunder and Wazirabad, passing his matriculation from Jullunder in 1932. He stood first in matriculation that earned him a scholarship to attend the DAV College in 1932. In 1936, he earned BA in Economics and Political science and went on to attend the D.A.V. College, Lahore of Punjab University, where he earned an MA in Economics in 1938. He ranked first in MA in Economics examination at the Punjab University, setting a new record in that subject. He also did his LLB from there.

During his time at the Punjab University, Haq participated in a large number of declamation contests and prize debates and was often judged as the best speaker. From 1936 to 1938, he was an activist of All-India Muslim League and was a student advocate of the assertion of the separate identity of the Muslims of India. He attended the All-India Muslim League meeting in Calcutta in December 1937 as a student delegate.

In 1939, he was selected and joined the Indian Civil Service and went to United Kingdom to be educated in Oxford. Upon returning in 1940, he was appointed Assistant Commissioner at Ferozepur and later appointed as Undersecretary of Punjab and the North-West Frontier from 1942 until 1944. In 1944, he was appointed as Sub Divisional Magistrate at the Dalhousie, India and heard various cases involving the civil lawsuits. During the same time, he was sent to Gurdaspur and was appointed as Deputy Commissioner and later elevated as Session Judge as well as Assistant Commissioner in 1946. For a short brief of time, he served as the deputy commissioner of Hissar (in East Punjab) in 1946, before joining the Cabinet Mission to be served as its Secretary to the Partition Steering Committee for the Punjab in 1947.

After the establishment of Pakistan as a result of partition of British India, Haq opted for Pakistan and was appointed as deputy commissioner of Rawalpindi, Punjab, Pakistan. During this time, he worked towards managing the Indian emigrants settling in Pakistan. From 1948 to 1952, he served in the bureaucracy as deputy commissioner of Montgomery and Sialkot.

In 1952, he joined the Ministry of Defence (MoD) as its deputy secretary until 1954 when he left for the United Kingdom to attend the Imperial Defence College in London. In 1956, he earned the degree and secured his graduation from the Imperial Defence College and subsequently returned to Pakistan. He was appointed as joint secretary in MoD but later moved to Ministry of Law and Justice (MoLJ) to pursue career as federal judge.

=== Supreme court and chief justice ===
In 1957, he was elevated as district-session judge in Sindh High Court but later moved to Lahore High Court in Punjab in 1958. In 1959, he was appointed as a judge in the West Pakistan High Court[now Just Pakistan] and moved on to the Supreme Court as a senior justice in 1962. In 1965, he was appointed as the deputy leader of the Pakistan Delegation to the Third Commonwealth and Empire Law Conference held at Sydney, Australia in 1965. In 1967, he was appointed as a member of the Law Reform Commission led by Chief Justice Alvin Robert Cornelius that conducted the various case studies on land reforms in Pakistan.

In 1969, he was selected to lead a Legal Expert Delegation to Somalia to provide expertise in overviewing the constitutional crises in Somalia. In 1970, he was elevated as Chief Justice of the Lahore High Court by President Yahya Khan who issued the decree, the LFO No. 1970 that dissolved the status of West Pakistan. He witnessed the war between India and Pakistan which resulted in the liberation of Bangladesh.

On 26 December 1971, he was named as a member of the War Enquiry Commission (WEC) along with Chief Justice Hamoodur Rahman, and the chief justices of the Sindh, Balochistan, and Punjab High Court, formed by the Chief Justice Rahman on the request of then-President Zulfikar Ali Bhutto. On 1 January 1972, he was re-elevated as the senior justice at the Supreme Court.

Temporal Order	Name of Post	From	To
1	Secretary to the Punjab and North-West Frontier Province Public Service Commission. Secretary to Government of Punjab, Pakistan, Medical & Local Government Department	22 February 1944	29 February 1944
2	Under-Secretary to Government of Punjab, Pakistan Revenue Department, Lahore	1 March 1944	1 May 1944
3	Sub-Divisional Magistrate, Dalhousie, India	2 May 1944	
4	Special Sub-Judge at Lahore for Judicial training	9 November 1944	
5	Sub-Divisional Magistrate, Dalhousie	28 May 1945	
6	Deputy Commissioner, Gurdaspur, India	June 1945	July 1945
7	District and Sessions Judge, Gurdaspur	3 November 1945	
8	Assistant Commissioner, Gurdaspur	23 February 1946	
9	Deputy Commissioner, Hisar, India	27 March 1946	
10	Secretary to the Partition Steering Committee for Punjab, Pakistan	9 July 1947	
11	Deputy Commissioner, Rawalpindi, Pakistan	8 August 1947	
12	Deputy Commissioner, Montgomery (now Sahiwal), Pakistan	October 1948	
13	Deputy Commissioner, Sialkot	April 1950	
14	Deputy Secretary, Ministry of Defence, Government of Pakistan, Rawalpindi	January 1952	December 1954
15	Training at Imperial Defence College (IDC), London	January 1955	December 1955
16	Deputy Secretary, Ministry of Defence, Government of Pakistan, Karachi	August 1956	
17	Joint Secretary, Ministry of Defence, Government of Pakistan, Karachi	August 1956	
18	District and Sessions Judge, Karachi	February 1957	
19	District and Sessions Judge, Lahore	June 1958	
20	Additional Judge, High Court of West Pakistan, Lahore	24 October 1959	
21	Permanent Judge, High Court of West Pakistan, Lahore	24 October 1962	
22	Member of the Law Reforms Commission	May 1967	
23	Acting leader of the legal expert delegation to the Republic of Somalia	July 1969	
24	Chief Justice Lahore High Court, Lahore, on dismemberment of One Unit	1 July 1970	
25	Judge, Supreme Court of Pakistan	16 October 1972	
26	Chief Justice of Pakistan	23 September 1977	25 March 1981
27	11th President of Pakistan	20 April 1978	7 May 1978

== Other ==
Haq attended the Third Commonwealth and Empire Law Conference in Sydney, Australia in August–September 1965 as leader of the Pakistan delegation. He was interested in academic and educational activities and had been a member of the Syndicates of:

- Punjab University
- University of Engineering and Technology, Lahore
- University of Agriculture, Faisalabad in Lyallpur (now called Faisalabad)
- Allama Iqbal Open University, Islamabad

== See also ==
- Chief Justice of Pakistan
- Supreme Court of Pakistan
- List of Pakistanis

Legal offices
Preceded by Muhammad Yaqub Ali	Chief Justice of Pakistan; 1977–1981	Succeeded by Mohammad Haleem
