= Ashraf W. Tabani =

Pakistani politician

Ashraf W. Tabani (17 December 1930 – 16 July 2009) was a Pakistani businessman and politician. He was the Governor of Sindh and the Provincial Minister of Finance, Industries, Excise and Taxation between 1981 and 1984 when Zia-ul-Haq was the President of Pakistan. He was born to the Tabani business family and belonged to the Gujarati-speaking Memon community.

== See also ==
- Habib Wali Mohammad, brother
