= Sadiq-ur-Rashid Ibrahim Abbasi =

Pakistani military officer (1928–2002)

Lt. Gen. Sadiq-ur-Rashid Ibrahim Abbasi
- صادق الرشید ابراہیم عباسی

13th Governor of Sindh (military administration)
- In office 18 September 1978 – 6 April 1984
- Preceded by: Abdul Kadir Shaikh
- Succeeded by: Jahan Dad Khan

Commander V Corps
- In office September 1978 – March 1980
- Preceded by: General Iqbal Khan
- Succeeded by: Ahmad Jamal Khan

Personal details
- Born: 1928 Pakistan
- Died: 21 March 2002 (aged 73–74) Combined Military Hospital Rawalpindi
- Resting place: The Abbasi Royal Graveyard
- Spouse: Begum Yasmin Sultana
- Children: 3
- Relatives: Rafiqa Abbasi (sister); Abbas Abbasi (brother); Sahibzada Muzammil-ur-Rashid Abbasi (nephew)
- Education: Aitchison College; Royal Indian Military Academy; Pakistan Military Academy; Royal School of Artillery

Military service
- Allegiance: PAK
- Branch/service: Pakistan Army
- Years of service: 1948–1984
- Rank: Lieutenant General
- Unit: 11 Field Regiment of Artillery
- Commands: 11 Lt Medium Regiment Artillery
- Awards: Nishan-e-Pakistan; Hilal-e-Imtiaz (MI)

Sahibzada Muhammad Sadiq ur-Rashid Ibrahim Abbasi HI(M) (Urdu: صادق الرشید ابراہیم عباسی; 1928–2002), also known as S.M. Abbasi, was a three star general in the Pakistani Army, Governor of Sindh (military administration) and member of the Bahawalpur royal family.

== Early life and education ==
He was born in Bahawalpur into the Bahawalpur royal family and received his early education from Aitchison College at Lahore.

== Military career ==
He joined the Royal Pakistan Army. He was commissioned in the 1 Mountain Regiment of the Royal Pakistan Artillery on 25 November 1948 as a 2nd Lieutenant. During this time, he received his military education from the Royal Indian Military Academy in Dehra Dun, India, Pakistan Military Academy in Kakul, Royal Pakistan Artillery School in Nowshera, Khyber Pakhtunkhwa and the Royal Artillery School in Larkhill, Wilts.

He remained Major General Artillery (now called DG Arty) and was promoted to rank of Lieutenant-General in 1978. He became commander of V Corps in Karachi from 1978 to 1980. During this time, he also served as martial law administrator Zone D (Baluchistan) in General Zia ul Haq.

=== Military Governor ===
He served as Governor of Sindh (military administration) starting 18 September 1978. The same year on his orders, a protest in Nawabshah (see: Human rights abuses in Pakistan under Muhammad Zia-ul-Haq) was crushed using military combat helicopters which resulted in hundreds of deaths of supporters of Zulfikar Ali Bhutto.

On 8 June 1982, he laid the foundation stones of the Al-Markaz Islami Centre with a goal of promoting Islamic traditions and culture in Sindh.

After the execution of Zulfikar Ali Bhutto on 4 April 1979, Muhammad Zia-ul-Haq flew to Karachi to discuss the burial arrangements of Bhutto with Abbasi who was then Governor of Sindh.

== Personal life ==
He married Begum Yasmin Sultana daughter of Mir Maqbul Mahmud, in Lahore on 27 February 1960.

== Death ==
He died from heart failure at the Combined Military Hospital Rawalpindi on 21 March 2002. He is buried at Nawabi Cemetery, Fort Derawar. He had one son and two daughters.
