= Rahimuddin Khan =

Pakistani general (1926–2022)

Rahimuddin Khan NI(M) SBt
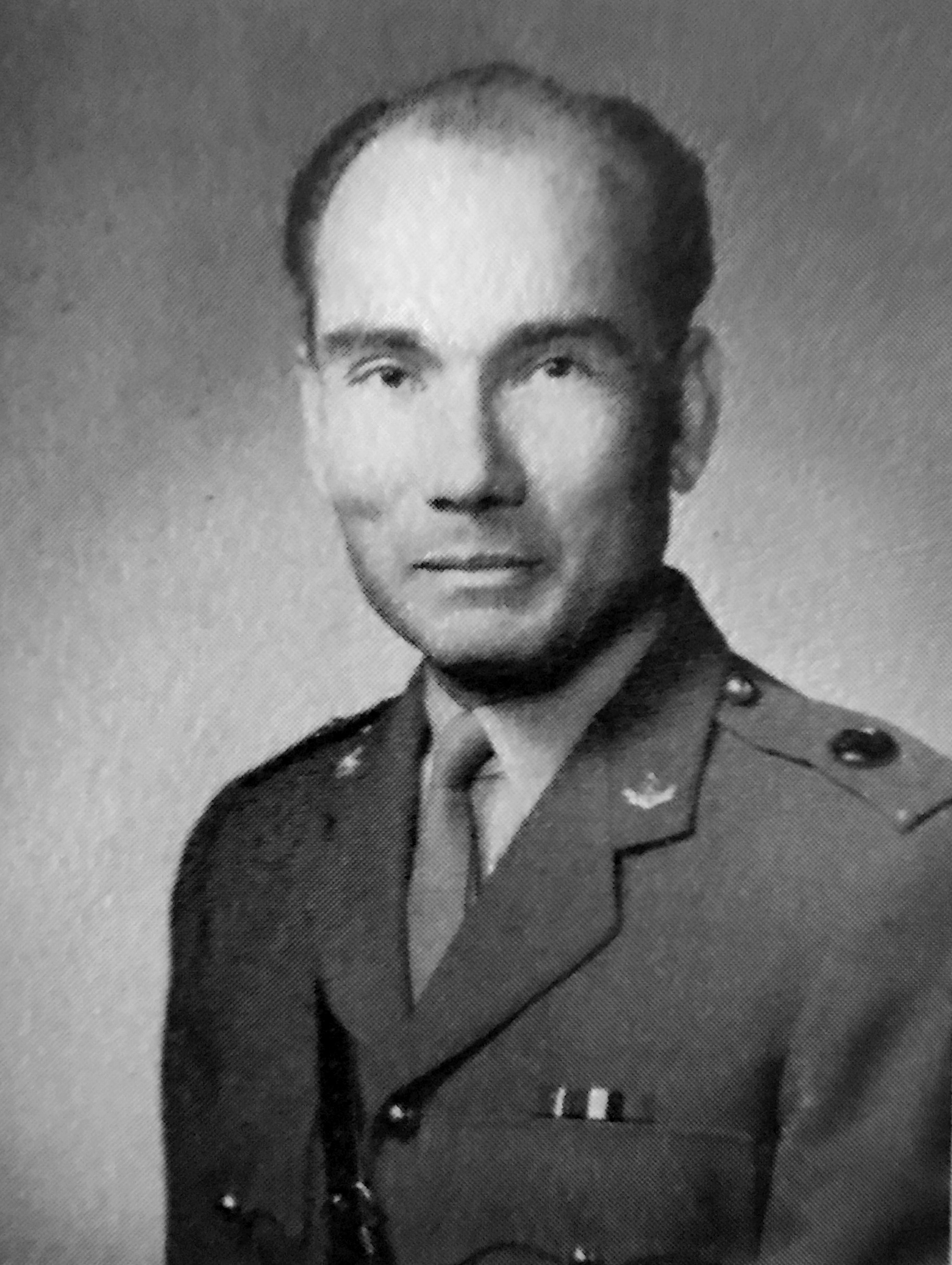

7th Governor of Balochistan
- In office 18 September 1978 – 22 March 1984
- Preceded by: Khuda Bakhsh Marri
- Succeeded by: F. S. Lodhi

16th Governor of Sindh
- In office 24 June 1988 – 11 September 1988
- Chief Minister: Akhtar Ali G. Kazi
- Preceded by: Ashraf W. Tabani
- Succeeded by: Qadeeruddin Ahmed

Personal details
- Born: 21 July 1926 Kaimganj, United Provinces, British India (present-day Uttar Pradesh, India)
- Died: 22 August 2022 (aged 96) Lahore, Punjab, Pakistan
- Spouse: Saqiba Rahimuddin
- Relations: Mahmud Husain (father-in-law); Zakir Husain (uncle)
- Education: Jamia Millia Islamia; Pakistan Military Academy; Command and General Staff College

Military service
- Branch/service: Pakistan Army
- Years of service: 1948–1987
- Rank: General
- Unit: Baloch Regiment
- Commands: 111 Brigade, Rawalpindi; II Corps, Multan; Ras Koh nuclear test sites; 8th Infantry Division; Chairman Joint Chiefs of Staff Committee
- Battles/wars: Indo-Pakistani war of 1947–1948; Lahore riots of 1953; Balochistan conflict; Soviet–Afghan War
- Awards: Nishan-e-Imtiaz; Sitara-e-Basalat

Rahimuddin Khan (Note: Urdu: رحیم الدین خان) (21 July 1926 – 22 August 2022) was a Pakistani four-star general who served as the fourth Chairman Joint Chiefs of Staff Committee of the Pakistan Army from 1984 to 1987. He also served as the seventh Governor of Balochistan, from 1978 to 1984, and briefly as the 16th Governor of Sindh in 1988.

After the Partition of British India, Rahimuddin enrolled as the first cadet of the Pakistan Military Academy. He was posted along the future Line of Control during the Indo-Pakistan war of 1947–1948. As a captain, he was part of military action during the 1953 Lahore riots. He later commanded 111 Brigade in Rawalpindi and II Corps in Multan. As Chairman Joint Chiefs, he rejected the future military plan for the Kargil Conflict.

As the longest-serving governor of Balochistan, Rahimuddin declared a general amnesty and ended all military operations in the province. His tenure saw widespread development, including the opening of Sui gas fields to Quetta, the construction of nuclear test sites in Chaghai, and the halting of the Baloch insurgency. He was credited with financial honesty, but controversially suppressed mujahideen entering the province during the Soviet war in Afghanistan. Rahimuddin refused an extension of service as Chairman Joint Chiefs, retiring in 1987.

== Early life and family ==
Rahimuddin Khan was born on 21 July 1926, in Kaimganj to a Muslim family belonging to the Pashtun Afridi tribe, with roots in Kohat and Tirah. He was the nephew of educationist Zakir Husain, later the President of India, and the son-in-law of Husain's brother, Mahmud Husain.

He attended Jamia Millia Islamia University in Delhi, and opted for Pakistan during independence in 1947.

== Military service ==
Rahimuddin enrolled as Gentleman Cadet-1 of the Pakistan Military Academy. He was posted along the future Line of Control in Azad Kashmir during the Indo-Pakistan war of 1947–1948. As a captain, he was part of the military operation under Azam Khan during the 1953 Lahore riots. He attended Command and General Staff College at Fort Leavenworth, Kansas, and Command and Staff College in Quetta in 1965, and was posted to Hyderabad in 1969. He served as inaugural commander of 111 Brigade in Rawalpindi in 1970. Rahimuddin served as Chief Instructor at the Armed Forces War College at the then National Defence College, Rawalpindi, until 1975.

Prime Minister Zulfikar Ali Bhutto requested Rahimuddin to head the new Atomic Energy Commission and nuclear programme, but was declined. As lieutenant-general, he became Commander II Corps in Multan in 1976. He was made Chairman Joint Chiefs of Staff Committee by General Zia-ul-Haq on 22 March 1984, a position he served in till 29 March 1987.

=== Rejection of Kargil plan ===
As Chairman Joint Chiefs, Rahimuddin was asked to approve the military plan for an offensive in Kargil, Kashmir, in 1986. The plan was authored by Commander I Corps. Both Rahimuddin and Air Chief Marshal Jamal A. Khan rejected it as untenable, citing the harsh conditions, strategy, and concurrent conflict with the Soviet Union in Afghanistan. The plan was later approved by General Pervez Musharraf, leading to the Kargil war in 1998.

=== Extension refusal ===
Rahimuddin declined an extension of service at superannuation, and retired in 1987. After his retirement on time, Prime Minister Muhammad Khan Junejo rejected Zia's proposal of extension for Vice Chief of Staff General KM Arif, embarrassing Zia. Arif was replaced by Mirza Aslam Beg as Vice Chief.

== Governor of Balochistan ==
=== End of operation and withdrawal ===
A military operation against separatists was commenced in Balochistan by Prime Minister Zulfikar Ali Bhutto led by army chief Tikka Khan in 1973, claiming thousands of lives. Rahimuddin was appointed Governor of Balochistan on 16 September 1978. He declared an end to the operation, and announced a general amnesty for fighters willing to give up arms. Army withdrawal was completed by 1979. The Baloch separatist movement came to a standstill. Under Rahimuddin, the Foreign Policy Centre held that "the province's tribal sardars were taken out of the pale of politics for the first time." He was known for a clean reputation during corrupt regimes.

=== Development ===
Rahimuddin opened the Sui gas field to provide gas directly to Quetta and other Baloch towns for the first time. Electricity expansion from Quetta to Loralai converted vast areas with sub-soil water into fertile ones. He also consolidated the then-contentious integration of Gwadar into Balochistan, notified as a district in 1977. Despite opposition from finance minister Ghulam Ishaq Khan, Rahimuddin heavily promoted large-scale manufacturing and investment in infrastructure, leading to provincial GDP growth rising to the highest in Balochistan's history. Addressing the province's literacy rate, the lowest in the country, he administered the freeing up of resources towards education, created girls' incentive programs, and had several girls' schools built in Dera Bugti District. He also oversaw the construction of nuclear test sites in Chaghai where tests were conducted in 1998.

=== Al-Zulfikar hijacking ===
In March 1981, the militant group Al-Zulfikar, led by Murtaza Bhutto, hijacked a Pakistan International Airlines airplane from Karachi to Kabul, and shot and killed passenger Captain Tariq Rahim, mistakenly believing him to be the son of General Rahimuddin Khan. The decision to kill Rahim was taken after Murtaza Bhutto consulted KHAD chief Mohammad Najibullah.

== Governor of Sindh ==
Rahimuddin was appointed acting Governor of Sindh in May 1988. He dismissed large numbers of police and civil servants over corruption soon after taking office. He also launched a police crackdown on land mafia, one of the widest ever in Karachi, criticized by both PPP and the Zia regime for its heavy-handed tactics. It was stopped by the government immediately after he resigned. He moved to create separate police forces for the city and the rural areas, but this was also resisted after his resignation for fears of complicating the Sindhi-Muhajir relationship. Special riot control officers were trained to cope with ethnic riots, and river and forest police were also set up to battle dacoity. Ghulam Ishaq Khan became acting President after Zia's death in an aircrash on 17 August, and reintroduced the Chief Minister of Sindh office. Rahimuddin resigned as acting Governor in response to the attempt to limit his gubernatorial powers.

== Death ==
Rahimuddin died on 22 August 2022, in Lahore, Pakistan, at the age of 96.

== See also ==
- 1970s Operation in Balochistan
- Baloch Regiment
- Mahmud Husain
- Zakir Husain

== Notes ==
Political offices
Preceded by Khuda Bakhsh Marri	Governor of Balochistan; 1978–1984	Succeeded by F. S. Lodhi
Preceded by Ashraf W. Tabani	Governor of Sindh; 1988	Succeeded by Qadeeruddin Ahmed
Military offices
Preceded by Iqbal Khan	Chairman Joint Chiefs of Staff Committee; 1984–1987	Succeeded by Akhtar Abdur Rahman
