= Mohammad Haleem =

Former Chief Justice of the Supreme Court of Pakistan

Right Honourable Mohammad Haleem

10th Chief Justice of Pakistan
- In office 23 March 1981 – 31 December 1989
- Nominated by: Chief Justice Sh. Anwarul Haq
- Appointed by: Zia-ul-Haq
- Preceded by: Sh. Anwarul Haq
- Succeeded by: M. Afzal Zullah

Justice of the Supreme Court of Pakistan
- In office 1977 – 23 March 1981
- Nominated by: Yakob Ali
- Appointed by: Fazal Ilahi
- Preceded by: Sh. Anwarul Haq
- Succeeded by: M. Afzal Zullah

Chief Justice of Sindh High Court
- In office 1972–1977
- Nominated by: Hamoodur Rahman
- Appointed by: Zulfikar Ali Bhutto

Justice of the Balochistan High Court
- In office 1970–1972
- Nominated by: Hamoodur Rahman
- Appointed by: Zulfikar Ali Bhutto

Justice of the West-Pakistan High Court
- In office 1968–1970
- Nominated by: Dr. S. A. Rahman
- Appointed by: Ayub Khan

Personal details
- Born: Mohammad Haleem; 1 January 1925 Lucknow, Uttar Pradesh, British India now in Uttar Pradesh in India)
- Died: 11 August 2006 (aged 81) Karachi, Sindh, Pakistan
- Cause of death: Renal Failure
- Citizenship: (British Raj) British India (1925–47)
- Education: Lucknow University (LLB); Karachi University (PhD in Phil.)
- Awards: Hilal-i-Imtiaz

Military service
- Allegiance: Pakistan
- Branch/service: Pakistan Navy
- Years of service: 1947–1954
- Rank: Lieutenant
- Unit: JAG Corps, Navy
- Commands: Exe-Off. PNS Tariq

Muhammad Haleem (Urdu: محمد حلیم), LL.D. (HC), HI (1 January 1925 – 11 August 2006) was a Pakistani jurist who served as the 10th Chief Justice of Pakistan from 1981 to 1989, the longest serving Chief Justice in the history of the judicial branch in Pakistan. He was even endorsed by successive future regimes in Pakistan.

== Early life ==
Haleem was born in Lucknow, British India, he was the son of Barrister Muhammad Wasim, the first Advocate General of Pakistan, and the pre-independence Advocate General of Uttar Pradesh. Prior to entering legal practice he served as a lieutenant in the Pakistan Navy.

== Education ==
He received a Bachelor of Science and Bachelor of Laws degrees from Lucknow University in 1946, and a Doctor of Law (Honoris Causa) degree from Karachi University in 1990.

== Supreme Court Tenure ==
While on the Supreme Court and prior to his nomination as Chief Justice, Haleem was on the Supreme Court bench which heard the appeal against the Lahore High Court handing down the death penalty to former Prime Minister Zulfikar Ali Bhutto. He was one of three judges in the dissenting minority which voted to acquit Bhutto. However, the majority opinion was to uphold the conviction, which ultimately led to Bhutto's execution.

He was the chief justice of Pakistan from 25 March 1981 to 31 December 1989. As Chief Justice of Pakistan, he wrote the famous judgment in Benazir Bhutto's court case which made the holding of 1988 Pakistani general election possible. On 15 September 2006, paying tribute to Justice Haleem, Chief Justice of Pakistan in 2006, Iftikhar Muhammad Chaudhry observed that Justice Haleem, without fear and favor, had helped Pakistan, with his judgment, get back on rails of parliamentary democracy in 1988.

== Awards ==
He was awarded Hilal-i-Imtiaz in 1996 by the Government of Pakistan.

== Positions held ==
- Pleader
- Assistant Advocate General (1963)
- Judge, High Court of West Pakistan (1969)
- Judge, Supreme Court of Pakistan (1977)
- Chief Justice of Pakistan (1981–1989)
- Chairman, Pakistan Law Commission
- Chairman, Indus Water Commission
- Chairman, Supreme Judicial Council
- acted as President of Pakistan on several occasions during 1981–1984

== Publications ==
Work papers on:

1. The Proper Role of the International Court of Justice in the Law of the World Eleventh Conference of the World Peace through Law, Cairo, Egypt, September 1983
2. The Challenge of Social Justice: The Third International Conference of Appellate Judges, New Delhi, India, 5–8 March 1984
3. Intellectual Property Issues in Pakistan: International Property Colloquium of Judges in Asia and the Pacific, held under the auspices of the World Intellectual Property Organization at Sydney (Australia), 8–12 October 1984
4. The Advisory Jurisdiction of the International Court of Justice: Twelfth Conference of The World Peace Through Law Center, West Berlin, Federal Republic of Germany, 21–26 July 1985
5. The Development of Deep Sea Resources: Twelfth Conference of the World Peace Through Law Center, West Berlin, Federal Republic of Germany, 21–26 July 1985
6. Management of Supreme Court: Lawasia Conference of the Chief Justices on Management of Courts, Penang, Malaysia, 19–22 August 1985
7. Public Interest Litigation – Is it an Unruly Horse? Ninth Lawasia Conference, New Delhi, India, 7–12 October 1985
8. Law, Justice and Society: Fifth Pakistan Jurists Conference, Karachi, 28–30 March 1986
9. The Judiciary and the Intellectual Property System: Regional Forum of Judges organized jointly by the World Intellectual Property Organization (WIPO) and the Judges of the Supreme Court of Pakistan in Association with the Law Association for Asia and the Western Pacific (LAWASIA) and with the assistance of the United Nations Development Program (UNDP), Islamabad, 5 to 9 October 1986
10. Court as the Guardian of the Constitution: Fourth International Conference of Appellate Judges, Kuala Lumpur, Malaysia, 20–24 April 1987
11. Protecting and Expanding the Jurisdiction of the International Court of Justice: Thirteenth Biennial World Conference, Seoul, Republic of Korea, 6–11 September 1987
12. Transnational Terrorism: Thirteenth Biennial World Conference, Seoul, Republic of Korea, 6–11 September 1987
13. Address Delivered at the Second Conference of the Chief Justices of the LAWASIA region - South East Asian and the Western Pacific Countries, Islamabad, 18–22 October 1987
14. The Domestic Application of International Human Rights Norms: Judicial Colloquium held under the auspices of the Commonwealth Secretariat, London, at Bangalore, India, 24–26 February 1988
15. Permanent Sovereignty and International Responsibility: International Symposium on Legal Aspects of New International Economic Order, held at Islamabad, Pakistan, 14 March 1989

== See also ==
- Chief Justices of Pakistan
- Supreme Court of Pakistan
- List of Pakistanis

Legal offices
Preceded by Sheikh Anwarul Haq	Chief Justice of Pakistan; 1981–1989	Succeeded by Muhammad Afzal Zullah
