= Governor of Sindh =

Appointed head of the province of Sindh, Pakistan

- Governor of Sindh's Seal

- Provincial Flag of Sindh
- Incumbent; Nehal Hashmi since 13 March 2026
- Style: The Honorable (formal)
- Residence: Governor House
- Seat: Karachi, Sindh, Pakistan
- Nominator: Prime Minister of Pakistan
- Appointer: President of Pakistan
- Term length: 5 years
- Constituting instrument: Constitution of Pakistan
- Formation: 15 August 1947; 79 years ago
- First holder: Sir Charles Napier
- Salary: Rs 2,766,500
- Website: www.governorsindh.gov.pk

The governor of Sindh is the appointed head of the province of Sindh, Pakistan. The office of the governor as the head of the province is largely a ceremonial position; the executive powers lie with the Chief Secretary and the Chief Minister of Sindh.

However, there have been instances throughout the history of Pakistan of the powers of the provincial governors increasingly vastly whenever the provincial assemblies were dissolved and the administrative role came under direct control of the governors, as in the cases of martial laws of 1958–1972 and 1977–1985, and governor rules of 1999–2002. In the case of Sindh, there were two direct instances of governor's rule under Mian Aminuddin and Moinuddin Haider respectively, in 1951–1953 and 1998 when the provincial chief ministers of those times were removed and assemblies dissolved. There was indirect governor's rule briefly in June-July 1988 when Akhtar Ali Kazi took leave of office as caretaker chief minister, and Rahimuddin Khan served as acting Governor until Kazi resumed office on 31 August.

The governor is appointed by the president on the advice of the prime minister. The Governor House in Karachi is the official residence of the governor of Sindh. Nehal Hashmi is the current governor of Sindh.

== Caliphate ==
The Muslim province of Sind was under the reign of Umayyad and Abbasid caliphates. The governor of Sind was an official of Umayyad and Abbasid caliphates.

== Mughal Empire ==
Following its annexation of Sindh's independent sultanates, the Mughal Empire administered southern Sindh as the Thatta Subah or Sarkar from 28 Mar. 1593 until the early 18th century. Northern Sindh was ruled separately by the Kalhora dynasty until around 1739, when Persian assistance allowed them to annex Thatta Subah as well. Following the 1783 Battle of Halani, Kalhora control was replaced by the Talpur dynasty.

== British Raj ==
Sir Charles Napier (1843-1847) became the first ever Chief Commissioner and Governor of Sind.

== List of governors of Sindh ==
Following is a list of the governors of Sindh since Sind was established as a separate province on 1 April 1936.

British colonial, independent, civil, judicial or military administration Muslim League Pakistan Peoples Party Pakistan Muslim League (N) Pakistan Muslim League (Q) Pakistan Tehreek-e-Insaf MQM Acting governor or office abolished

Tenure no.	Governor		Political affiliation	Term of office		
Tenure no.	Portrait	Name	Political affiliation	Took office	Left office	Time in office
1		Sir Lancelot Graham	British colonial administration	April 1, 1936	March 31, 1941	4 years, 364 days
2		Sir Hugh Dow	British colonial administration	April 1, 1941	January 14, 1946	4 years, 288 days
3		Sir Robert Francis Mudie	British colonial administration	January 15, 1946	August 14, 1947	1 year, 211 days
4		Shaikh Ghulam Hussain Hidayatullah	Muslim League	August 15, 1947	October 4, 1948	1 year, 50 days
5		Shaikh Din Muhammad	Independent	October 7, 1948	November 19, 1949	1 year, 43 days
6		Mian Aminuddin	Independent	November 19, 1949	May 1, 1953	3 years, 163 days
7		George Baxandall Constantine	Civil administration	May 2, 1953	August 12, 1953	102 days
8		Habib Ibrahim Rahimtoola	Muslim League	August 12, 1953	June 23, 1954	315 days
9	Portrait of Iftikhar Hussain Khan Mamdot	Iftikhar Hussain Khan Mamdot	Muslim League	June 24, 1954	October 14, 1955	1 year, 112 days
–	Office abolished Sindh became part of the province of West Pakistan			October 14, 1955	June 30, 1970	14 years, 259 days
10		Rakhman Gul	Military administration (Pakistan Army)	July 1, 1970	December 20, 1971	1 year, 172 days
11		Mumtaz Bhutto	PPP	December 24, 1971	April 20, 1972	118 days
12		Mir Rasool Bux Talpur	PPP	April 29, 1972	February 14, 1973	291 days
13	Portrait of Ra'ana Liaquat Ali Khan	Begum Ra'ana Liaquat Ali Khan	Independent	February 15, 1973	February 28, 1976	3 years, 13 days
14		Muhammad Dilawar Khanji	PPP	March 1, 1976	July 5, 1977	1 year, 126 days
15		Abdul Kadir Shaikh	Civil administration	July 6, 1977	September 17, 1978	1 year, 73 days
16		S. M. Abbasi	Military administration (Pakistan Army)	September 18, 1978	April 6, 1984	5 years, 201 days
17		Jahan Dad Khan	Military administration (Pakistan Army)	April 7, 1984	January 4, 1987	2 years, 272 days
18		Ashraf W. Tabani	Independent	January 5, 1987	June 23, 1988	1 year, 170 days
19	Portrait of Rahimuddin Khan	Rahimuddin Khan	Military administration (Pakistan Army)	June 24, 1988	September 12, 1988	80 days
20		Qadeeruddin Ahmed	Judiciary	September 12, 1988	April 18, 1989	218 days
21	Portrait of Fakhruddin G. Ebrahim	Fakhruddin G. Ebrahim	Judiciary	April 19, 1989	August 6, 1990	1 year, 109 days
22	Portrait of Mahmoud Haroon	Mahmoud Haroon (first tenure)	Independent	August 6, 1990	July 18, 1993	2 years, 346 days
23		Hakim Muhammad Saeed	Independent	July 19, 1993	January 23, 1994	188 days
24	Portrait of Mahmoud Haroon	Mahmoud Haroon (second tenure)	Independent	January 23, 1994	May 21, 1995	1 year, 118 days
25		Kamaluddin Azfar	PPP	May 22, 1995	March 16, 1997	1 year, 298 days
26		Moinuddin Haider	Military administration (Pakistan Army)	March 17, 1997	June 17, 1999	2 years, 92 days
27	Portrait of Mamnoon Hussain	Mamnoon Hussain	PML(N)	June 19, 1999	October 12, 1999	115 days
28		Azim Daudpota	Military administration (Pakistan Air Force)	October 25, 1999	May 24, 2000	212 days
29	Portrait of Muhammad Mian Soomro	Muhammad Mian Soomro	PML(Q)	May 25, 2000	December 26, 2002	2 years, 215 days
30	Portrait of Ishrat-ul-Ibad Khan	Ishrat-ul-Ibad Khan	MQM	December 27, 2002	November 9, 2016	13 years, 318 days
31		Saeeduzzaman Siddiqui	Independent	November 11, 2016	January 11, 2017	61 days
32		Mohammad Zubair	PML(N)	February 2, 2017	August 3, 2018	1 year, 182 days
33	Portrait of Imran Ismail	Imran Ismail	PTI	August 27, 2018	April 18, 2022	3 years, 234 days
–		Agha Siraj Durrani (acting)	PPP	April 20, 2022	October 9, 2022	172 days
34		Kamran Tessori	MQM-P	October 10, 2022	March 12, 2026	3 years, 153 days
35		Nehal Hashmi	PML(N)	March 13, 2026	Incumbent	242 days

== See also ==
- Chief Minister of Sindh
- Government of Sindh
- Provincial Assembly of Sindh
- List of governors of Pakistan
- List of chief ministers in Pakistan
- List of presidents of Pakistan
- List of commissioners and governors of Sind in British India
- Commissioner Karachi
- Mayor of Karachi
- Administrator Karachi
- Government of Karachi
