= Mushahid Hussain =

Pakistani senator

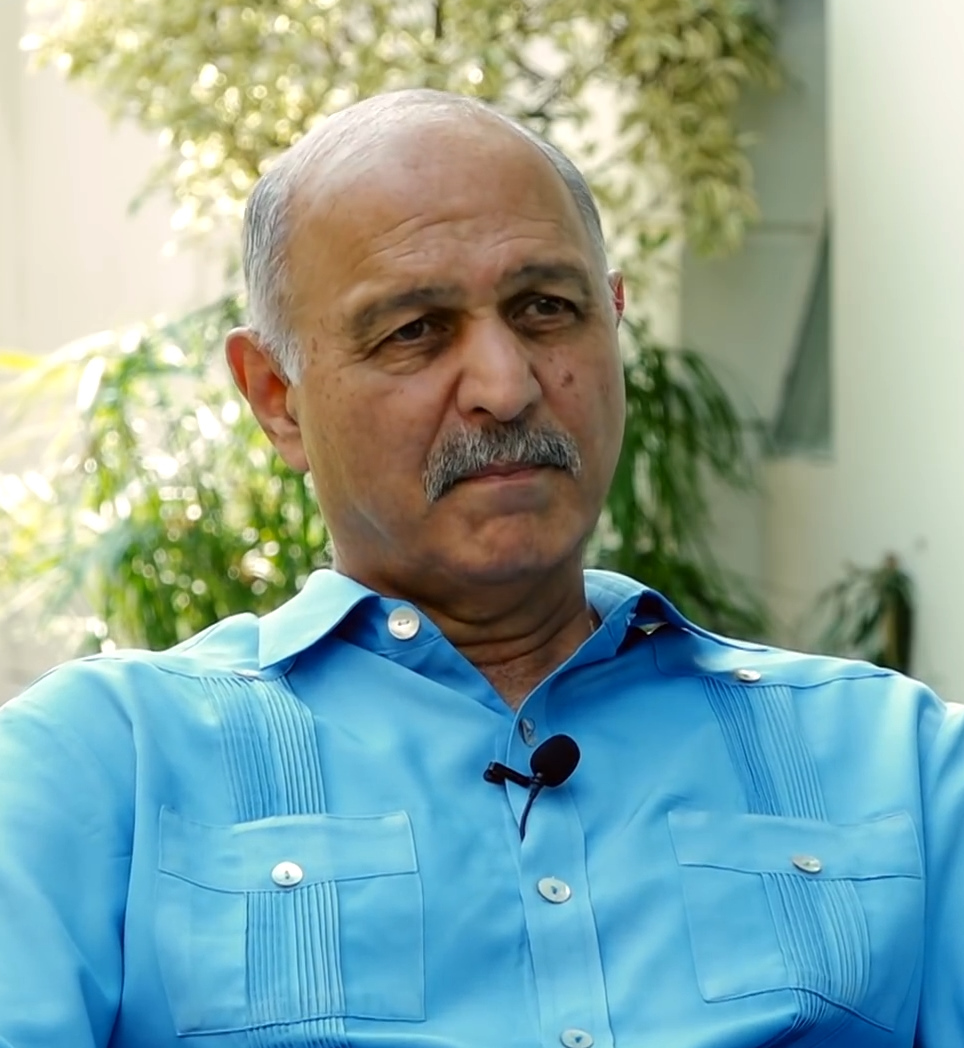
- Hussain in 2019

Member of the Senate of Pakistan
- In office 12 March 2018 – April 2024
- Constituency: Islamabad Capital Territory
- In office 12 March 2012 – 11 March 2018
- Constituency: Islamabad Capital Territory
- In office 23 March 2003 – 11 March 2009
- Constituency: Islamabad Capital Territory

Minister of Information and Broadcasting
- In office 17 February 1997 – 12 October 1999
- Prime Minister: Nawaz Sharif

Minister of Communications
- In office 26 May 1993 – 18 July 1993
- Prime Minister: Nawaz Sharif
- Preceded by: Samina Khalid Ghurki
- Succeeded by: Rana Shaukat Mehmood

Personal details
- Born: Mushahid Hussain Syed; 2 November 1952 (age 74) Sialkot, Punjab, Pakistan
- Citizenship: Pakistan
- Party: PMLN (2018-2024)
- Other political affiliations: PML-Q (2001-2018); PMLN (1993-2001)
- Education: F.C. College University (BA in journalism); Georgetown University (MS in foreign service)
- Profession: Journalist, politician,

Mushahid Hussain Syed (Punjabi, Urdu: مشاہد حسین سید; born 2 November 1952) is a Pakistani politician, and journalist who is currently the Pakistan Senator from the Islamabad Capital Territory on the platform of the Pakistan Muslim League (N), since 3 March 2018. He left PML-N in 2024.

A political journalist by profession, Hussain briefly served in the Sharif administrations in 1990s and is known for his political positions that reflects the national conservatism towards supporting the idea of civilian control of the military. After playing a crucial role in the support of the decision-making towards the nuclear weapons-testing in response to India's in 1998, Hussain's tenure was abrupted by the martial law staged by Pakistan Army Chief Gen. Pervez Musharraf and was held in prison on treason conspiracy in 1999. In 2003, he later defected to the forward block supporting the presidential campaign of Pervez Musharraf and was elected the Pakistan Senator of the Senate.

Despite his support for the PML(Q), the forward block supporting Musharraf for several years, Hussain remained sympathetics towards the PML(N) and eventually joined his original party after being ousted by the forward block in 2016. He is known as a proponent for strengthening the foreign relations with China and Central Asia, having served the Chairman of the China-Pakistan Institute, a lobbying firm based in Islamabad.

== Early life and education ==
Mushahid Hussain Syed was born in Sialkot, Punjab in Pakistan into a military Punjabi family on 2 November 1952. His father, Amjad Hussain Syed, was an army officer in the Pakistan Army, retiring with rank of army colonel; his mother, Sameen Sayed, was a social activist. Hussain is the fourth of five children, and both his parents were activists in the Pakistan Movement prior to 1947. His mother, Sameen, died at the age of 83 in 2010.

After his matriculation from Lahore, Hussain went to attend the Forman Christian College University, where he graduated with B.A. in journalism in 1974. During this time, he went to the United States under the Fulbright Program to attend the School of Foreign Service of the Georgetown University in Washington D.C. and graduated with the M.S. in foreign service, and briefly interned at the United States Congress. While studying in the United States, he was president of the Pakistan Students Association and was awarded a Congressional Internship to work in the United States Congress.

== Academic career ==
After completing his education, Hussain returned to Pakistan and joined the directing Staff of the Administrative Staff College in Lahore to instruct courses on international relations to the civil servants prior to their joining of the Pakistan Foreign Service. He also served as the visiting professor on the topics of international relations at the Punjab University but was terminated from his employment when he spoke on a rally to oppose the martial law government in October 1979.

== Journalistic career ==
After his termination, he began writing syndicated political columns on conservatism and joined the English daily The Muslim, of which he became its editor-in-chief in 1982. He also joined The Hindustan Times where he wrote the syndicated column.

In 1983, he joined the Non-Aligned News Agencies which he co-chaired in New Delhi. In 1985–86, Hussain had established himself as a journalist and had enjoyed considerable fame when he wrote articles on politics and security.

In 1988, he reportedly lost his job as a journalist when he published an interview in The Muslim on the issue of the country's covert atomic bomb program when President Zia-ul-Haq froze the funding of the news correspondent

== Political career ==
=== Information minister in Sharif administrations and imprisonment ===
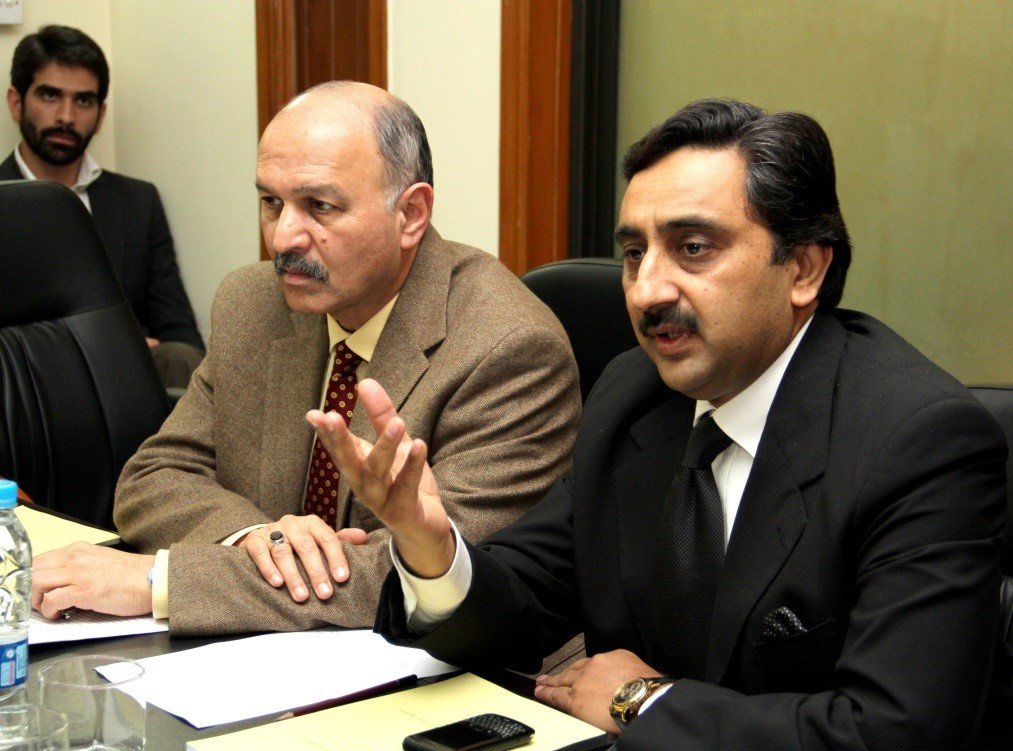
Hussain (left) discussing the Fair Trial bill at the RSIL meeting in 2017.

After covering the nationwide general elections held in 1990, Hussain joined the IDA government led by Prime Minister Nawaz Sharif and was inducted as an adviser on External Publicity and Foreign Affairs in the first administration, which he served until 1993. He advised the Prime Minister Sharif on the issues relating to the foreign relations with the United States, India, and the geostrategy in Central Asia, and was later elevated as the Minister of Communications. In 1994, he was appointed as the information secretary of the PML(N) while he continued to write columns and articles on the issue of national conservatism and security in country's major news and political correspondents.

In 1997, he played a crucial role in the managing the public relations of the election campaign of Nawaz Sharif in general elections held in 1997, and reportedly quoted in favor of Nawaz Sharif: "Nawaz will be the Erbakan of Pakistan." He participated and defended the NA-125 constituency based on Lahore and was elected as the member of national assembly on the platform of the Pakistan Muslim League (N) whereas joining the Prime Minister Sharif's second administration as the Information Minister in his cabinet.

In 1998, when Indian Prime Minister Atal Bihari Vajpayee ordered the nuclear tests in Rajasthan, Hussain was the first cabinet minister who spoke in the favor of conducting the reciprocated nuclear tests during the decision-making process. Hussain was reportedly known in the political circles as a "War hawk." He repeatedly praised Prime Minister Sharif on various public convention of authorizing the nuclear testing program to counter the India's aggression in the region to ensure the mutual assured destruction to India in case of a war. He later went onto speak on the CNN, Fox News, and the Face the Nation on CBS News to defend the decision to conduct nuclear tests. In 1998, he supported the Prime Minister Sharif's relief of commission of Gen. Jehangir Karamat as the Chairman joint chiefs, which he viewed as vital for government's civilian control of the military at that time.

About the Kargil war, he reportedly spoke in favor of the conflict and reportedly noted in the televised press conference: bitter fighting has "internationalized Kashmir", and hence was worth the loss of life suffered by the Pakistan Army as well as the Kashmiri freedom fighters involved. In 1999, his tenure was abrupted when Chairman joint chiefs Gen. Pervez Musharraf staged a martial law against the elected civilian government, and placed him trial that sentenced him on a solitary confinement on a conspiracy of treason; he was declared as the prisoner of conscience. In 2000–01, he voiced for the civilian control of the military and the called for the support for the democratic movements in an opined article which The Washington Post profiled him as: "Pakistan Keeps Gag on Former Spokesman."

=== PML(Q)'s secretary and presidential campaign in 2008 ===
In 2003, Hussain agreed upon a deal with the Musharraf administration and joined the forward block, the PML(Q), led by Shujaat Hussain and ultimately ran for the senate elections held in 2002. His decision to defect against the ethical morality lost the credibility that he had built over the several decades as a "respected journalist and disciplined politician", and was received severe public criticism from news correspondents of defending the Musharraf's presidential campaign while serving as sitting army chief.

His credibility was greatly questioned in an editorial written in Dawn, the political correspondent, where Ziauddin claimed that Hussain filed for "nomination papers for the Senate elections reportedly with a letter of recommendation from Washington, D.C." In 2004, he joined the taskforce as the President Musharraf's special envoy to begin negotiate with the Baloch political leader Akbar Bugti, an ally of Benazir Bhutto, which eventually failed. he further earned notoriety when he was part of the same government which was eventually implicated in the Bugti's killing. After the resignation of President Pervez Musharraf, Hussain earned the nomination from the PML-Q to run his presidential campaign during the presidential election held in 2008. Hussain eventually lost the presidential elections with the largest margin, receiving only 44 votes out of 700 from the Electoral College as opposed top Asif Zardari (409/700) and S.Z. Siddiqui (216/700).

After elected as Pakistan Senator from Punjab in 2012, Hussain came under severe public criticism when it was reported that he only paid ₨. 82. (US¢ 0.82) in filing the tax returns, and was called as a tax evader by various news correspondents.

On 4 June 2012, Hussain was unanimously elected as the Chairman of the Senate Defence Committee chairman.

=== Rejoining PML(N) and Pakistan Senator ===
In October 2016, Prime Minister Nawaz Sharif appointed Hussain and Shizra Khan as the Prime Minister's Special Envoy on unrest in Kashmir and went to attend the Atlantic Council, where he termed the violation of the Indus Waters Treaty as "an act of war." He viewed the initiation of the strategic corridor as a crucial and one of the largest political achievement of Prime Minister Sharif, and has risen a strong political voice in support Prime Minister Sharif's economic policy.

On 3 January 2017, the PML-Q ousted Hussain from the party due to his "tacit alignment" and support for the PML(N)'s cause. On 4 February 2018, he rejoined the PML(N) and spoke very high of Nawaz's services to the country. In 2018, he was elected as the Pakistan Senator from Federally Administered Tribal Areas on the platform of PML(N) after participating in the senator elections held in March 2018.

== Other interests ==
=== Lobbyist and Sinologist ===
On 1 October 2009, Hussain founded the Pakistan China Institute to promote the bilateral relations with China. He has consistently lobbied for strengthening the relations with China and the Central Asian republics. He also expressed apprehension about the United States’ role in Pakistan while endorsing a deepening of relations with China.

== Books ==
Hussain has written political books covering issues such as the civilian control of the military, geostrategy, and governance.

- An Apology to the Puppet Government, With a Policy of neither East nor the West, Quetta: ARPE, 1986, 48 p.
- Pakistan and the Changing Regional Scenario: Reflections of a Journalist, Lahore: Progressive Publishers, 1988, 339 p.
- Pakistan's Politics: The Zia Years, Lahore: Progressive Publishers, 1990, 293 p.
- Pakistan: Problems of Governance, New Delhi: Konark Publishers, 1993, 166 p.

== See also ==
- Democratic movements in Pakistan
  - Civilian control of the military
  - Civil-military relations
  - Khakistocracy
  - Movement to impeach Pervez Musharraf
  - General Musharraf vs. Federation of Pakistan, et.al.
- Post Cold War era
- Conservatism in Pakistan
