= Contents of the United States diplomatic cables leak (Saudi Arabia) =

Content from the United States diplomatic cables leak has depicted Saudi Arabia and related subjects extensively. The leak, which began on 28 November 2010, occurred when the website of WikiLeaks — an international new media non-profit organization that publishes submissions of otherwise unavailable documents from anonymous news sources and news leaks — started to publish classified documents of detailed correspondence — diplomatic cables — between the United States Department of State and its diplomatic missions around the world. Since the initial release date, WikiLeaks is releasing further documents every day.

== Financial support for terrorist groups ==
Diplomats claim that Saudi Arabian donors are the main funders of non-governmental armed groups like Al-Qaeda, the Taliban and Lashkar-e-Taiba (LeT). Militants seeking donations often come during the annual hajj pilgrimage, Umrah and Ramadan. In one occasion, LeT, which carried out the 2008 Mumbai attacks, used a Saudi-based front company to fund its activities. A main concern of the officials at the U.S. embassy in Riyadh is protecting Saudi oilfields from al-Qaida attacks. To the dismay of Saudi authorities, right after the 9/11 attacks nearly eighty percent of the mosques in Saudi Arabia voiced support for Bin Laden.

== Afghanistan-Saudi relations ==
Afghan President Karzai's visited Saudi Arabia on February 2–3, although richer in symbolism than significance, was a sign that lukewarm Saudi-Afghan relations may finally be warming up. Saudi Arabia announced an aid package of US$150 million for reconstruction in Afghanistan. However, the Saudis continue to have concerns about Afghan corruption and believe greater political unification of the Pashtun community is essential. Their apparent wish to de-emphasize Karzai's visit, may also indicate the King Abdullah's desire to keep some distance and maintain his credibility as a potential reconciliation mediator. Saudi Foreign Minister, Prince Turki Al Faisal called Afghanistan a "puzzle", "where establishing trust with Afghan leaders, and recognizing the links between Pakistan and the Taliban, were keys to success. All financial aid to the Afghan government should be conditional, benchmarks must be set for the leadership, and aid must be withheld until these are met."

== GCC-Saudi relations ==
Saudi Arabia attempts to block co-operative projects between other GCC members. Furthermore, the Saudis are blocking a proposed causeway project between Qatar and the UAE and a proposed gas pipeline project between Qatar and Kuwait, because of Saudi objections, the Kuwaitis are now turning to the Iranians for gas. The Qatar-UAE causeway, when combined with the planned Qatar Bahrain Causeway, would greatly facilitate travel between the three countries this would eliminate the need to transit through Saudi Arabia.

== Iran-Saudi relations ==
=== Cut the head of Iranian snake ===
Saudi King Abdullah repeatedly urged the U.S. to attack Iran's nuclear facilities. In one diplomatic cable, King Abdullah said it was necessary to "cut the head of the snake", in reference to Iran's nuclear program. The Pakistani Ambassador to Saudi Arabia, Alisherzai had accused Russia of "fully supporting the Iranians' nuclear program", adding that all Shia communities in the region supported this program.

=== No to Iranian interference in Arab affairs ===
A heated discussion took place between the Former Iranian Foreign Minister Mottaki and Saudi King Abdullah noted Iran's interference in Arab affairs." When challenged by the King on Iranian meddling in Hamas affairs, Mottaki apparently protested that "these are Muslims." "No, Arabs" countered the King, "You as Persians have no business meddling in Arab matters." The King said the Iranians wanted to improve relations and that he responded by giving Mottaki an ultimatum. "I will give you one year" (to improve ties), "after that, it will be the end."

=== Iranian supremacy rejected ===
King Abdullah asserted that "Iran is trying to set up Hizballah-like organizations in African countries, the Iranians don't think they are doing anything wrong and don't recognize their mistakes." Abdullah said "he would favor Rafsanjani in an Iranian election, were he to run." He described Iran not as "a neighbor one wants to see", but as "a neighbor one wants to avoid." He said the Iranians "launch missiles with the hope of putting fear in people and the world. A solution to the Arab/Israeli conflict would be a great achievement, the King said, but Iran would find other ways to cause trouble. Iran's goal is to cause problems", he continued, "There is no doubt something unstable about them." He described Iran as "adventurous in the negative sense", and declared "May God prevent us from falling victim to their evil." Mottaki had tendered an invitation to visit Iran, but Abdullah said he replied "All I want is for you to spare us your evil." Summarizing his history with Iran, Abdullah concluded: "We have had correct relations over the years, but the bottom line is that they cannot be trusted."

=== Iranian nuclear ambitions are evil ===
During a meeting with Dutch and Russian ambassadors in Riyadh, Prince Turki al Kabeer Saudi Undersecretary for Multilateral Affairs at the Ministry of Foreign Affairs warned that "if Iran tried to produce nuclear weapons, other countries in the Gulf region would be compelled to do the same, or to permit the stationing of nuclear weapons in the Gulf to serve as a deterrent to the Iranians." Prince Turki also raised concerns that "the United States will negotiate a grand bargain with Iran without consulting Saudi Arabia is a concern we have heard often in recent weeks. Saudi Arabia is also concerned about the Russian-built reactor at Bushehr. A leakage from a plant at that location could bring an environmental catastrophe to Saudi Arabia, pointing out that it is located less than 300 kilometers away from Saudi shores, across open water." The Russian Ambassador Gibinvish, responded that Iran's wants to enrich uranium as it fears being attacked by Israel or the United States and also a sign of Iran's desire to establish its "supremacy" in the region. Prince Turki interjected: "And we cannot accept Iranian supremacy in the region. We are okay with nuclear electrical power and desalination, but not with enrichment." He said that the prospect of Iranian enrichment raises troubling questions about their motivations for doing so: "they do not need it!"

== Iraq-Saudi relations ==
=== Iraqi government wary of Saudi Arabia ===
The Iraqi government sees Saudi Arabia rather than Iran as the "biggest threat to the integrity and cohesion of their fledgling democratic state". A September 2009 cable stated, "Iraqi contacts assess that the Saudi goal (and that of most other Sunni Arab states, to varying degrees) is to enhance Sunni influence, dilute Shia dominance and promote the formation of a weak and fractured Iraqi government."

=== Saudi Arabia counters Iraqi Shiite influence ===
Furthermore, Saudis had pressured Kuwait to backtrack on initial agreements with Iraq on issues dating to the Saddam-era. Saudi Arabia was also opposed to Qatar's and Bahrain's plan to seek better ties with Iraq. According to American diplomats, like the Iranians, the Saudis have not hesitated to use their money and political influence inside Iraq. Iraqi contacts assess that the Saudi goal and that of most other Sunni Arab states, to vary degrees is to enhance Sunni influence, diminish Shia dominance and promote the formation of a weak and fractured Iraqi government. The Saudis are using their money and media power through satellite channel like Al-Arabiyya, Al-Sharqiya and other various media they control or influence to support Sunni political aspirations, exert influence over Sunni tribal groups and counter the Shia-led Islamic Supreme Council of Iraq (ISCI) and Iraqi National Alliance (INA). A recent Iraqi press article quoted anonymous Iraqi intelligence sources assessing that Saudi Arabia was leading a Gulf effort to destabilize the Maliki government and was financing "the current al Qaida offensive in Iraq."

=== US invasion gave Iraq to Iran ===
In a meeting with White House counterterrorism adviser John O. Brennan, Saudi King Abdullah stated that "some say the U.S. invasion handed Iraq to Iran on a silver platter; this after we fought Saddam Hussein."

=== No hope for Nour al Maliki ===
King Abdullah, the Saudi Foreign Minister Prince Saud bin Faisal and Prince Muqrin all stated that the Saudi government would not send an ambassador to Baghdad or open an embassy there in the near future, citing both security and political grounds in support of this position. The Saudi monarch stated that he does not trust Nouri al Maliki because the Iraqi Prime Minister had "lied" to him in the past by promising to take certain actions and then failing to do so. The King did not say precisely what these allegedly broken promises might have been. He repeated his oft heard view that al-Maliki rules Iraq on behalf of his Shiite sect instead of all Iraqis. King Abdullah has expressed his dismay over Nouri al Maliki by stating that he does not trust him and calling him an "Iranian agent." The King and Princes all suggested that the Saudi government might be willing to consider the provision of economic and humanitarian assistance to Iraq at initial stages it would be in the range $75–300 million.

== Israel-Saudi relations ==
=== Israeli seeks to block US planes for Saudi Arabia ===
During the Executive Session of the 40th Joint Political Military Group (JPMG), Israelis expressed their concerns to the Americans regarding the US sale of F-15 planes to Saudi Arabia. Furthermore, Israelis were perturbed that these planes could be stationed at the Tabuk airfield in the northwest corner of Saudi Arabia, close to the Israeli border.

=== Gulf States nuclear ambitions worry Israel ===
Israeli Mossad Chief, Meir Dagan in a meeting with US under secretary said that "Gulf states and Saudi Arabia are concerned about the growing importance of Iran and its influence on them. They are taking precautions, trying to increase their own military defensive capabilities." Dagan warned that these countries would not be able to cope with the amount of weapons systems they intend to acquire: "They do not use the weapons effectively."

== Pakistan-Saudi relations ==
=== Saudis are players in Pakistan ===
According to Time magazine, the diplomatic cables reveal that "Saudis are long accustomed to having a significant role in Pakistan's affairs." Saudi Arabian Ambassador to the United States Adel al-Jubeir boasted about the Saudi involvement in Pakistani affairs, stating, "We in Saudi Arabia are not observers in Pakistan, we are participants."

=== Saudi contempt for Zardari ===
The diplomatic cables also reveal Saudis have never liked the Shi'a-dominated Pakistan People Party and complain over Pakistan President Asif Ali Zardari's "alleged corruption and incompetence" and suggest a Saudi bias against Zardari as a Shi'ite, friendly with Iran. According to a cable sent in October 2008, shortly after the 2008 Pakistani presidential election, the Pakistani Deputy Chief of Mission Sarfraz Khanzada said that Saudi financial assistance to Pakistan had been sharply reduced because of "a lack of Saudi confidence in the Zardari government." Khanzada stated his opinion that "the Saudi government appeared to be 'waiting for the Zardari government to fall.'" Saudi King Abdullah called President Asif Ali Zardari of Pakistan the greatest obstacle to the country's progress. "When the head is rotten", he said, "it affects the whole body".

=== Saudi Arabia's friend Nawaz Sharif ===
Saudi King Abdullah would prefer to see Pakistan run by former PM Nawaz Sharif, and were cutting back assistance to Pakistan to hasten this eventuality. Nawaz "practically lives" in Saudi Arabia, Nawaz had even been favored with reserved prayer space in the Prophet's Mosque in Medina. Because Nawaz's daughter is married to a grandson of King Fahd and he has "become a member of the Saudi royal family. ~ Muhammad Amir("Amir Bhai")" The Saudis were pushing Pakistan's civilian leaders to work together, but "compromise seemed alien to Pakistani politicians."

=== Pakistan Army is Saudi Arabia's "winning horse" ===
In a May 2009 discussion with Holbrooke, Prince Mohammed bin Nayef, Saudi Assistant Minister of the Interior, describes the Pakistani Chief of Army staff Ashfaq Parvez Kayani as a "decent man" and the Pakistani Army as Saudi Arabia's "winning horse" and its "best bet." Pakistani soldiers needed to be proud of their service, and not hide their identity as soldiers when they were off duty. for "stability". Time reported that "despite the tensions with Zardari's government, military and intelligence links between Riyadh and Islamabad remain strong and close." Time interviewee, Arif Rafiq of an international consulting firm, stated that the cables "demonstrate that the Saudis have deep vested interests in Pakistan and an influence that is so significant that even the U.S. in some way relies on Saudi knowledge of the country." Prince Muhammad bin Nayef has commented that "Pakistan must let people know that it is fighting a war to keep Pakistan united and its people safe. But if we want one hundred percent from Pakistan, he cautioned, we should make them feel more secure on their border with India." He also noted that King Abdullah "has concerns about the Pakistani government; the biggest problem is the army." He said that General Kayani (Army Chief of Staff) is a "good man."

=== Saudi Arabia and UAE fund extremism in Punjab province ===
From missionary and Islamic charity organizations and apparently with the direct support of governments in Saudi Arabia and the United Arab Emirates, nearly US$100 million was making its way annually to clerics in madrassas located in the southern part of Pakistan's largest Punjab Province. A network of Deobandi and Wahhabi mosques and madrassahs are being strengthened through an influx of charity which originally reached organisations such as Jamaat-ud-Dawa and Al khidmat foundation. Some amount would also be given away to clerics in order to expand these sects. Moreover, children recruited would receive specific indoctrination including sectarian extremism, hatred for non-Muslims, anti-Western/anti-Pakistan government philosophy and are encouraged to wage Jihad.

=== Pakistan and Saudi Arabia "unique relationship" ===
In a meeting with the Saudi Interior Minister, Prince Muhammad bin Nayef, former US Special Representative to Afghanistan and Pakistan, Richard Holbrooke stressed that "U.S. desire for stronger cooperation and a common U.S./Saudi approach to Pakistan based on economic assistance, encouraging cooperation between Pakistani political factions, and transforming the Pakistani army to fight a counterinsurgency war." Prince Muhammad bin Nayef noted that the Saudis viewed the Pakistan army as the strongest element for stability in the country. The U.S. and Saudi shared the opinion that they might be able to live with some degree of instability in Afghanistan, but not with an unstable Pakistan, because of Pakistan's nuclear arms, fragile politics, and relationship with India. It's clear that Saudi Arabia has a "unique" relationship with Pakistan, He noted that over 800,000 Pakistanis live and work in Saudi Arabia. Saudi Arabia was especially important to Nawaz Sharif, the most popular politician in Pakistan. These were reasons why what happened in Pakistan was of direct concern to both the U.S. and Saudi Arabia. Neither the U.S. nor Saudi Arabia could afford to let Pakistan fall apart.

=== Turkey seen as answer to Saudi influence in Pakistan ===
Former US Ambassador to Pakistan, Anne W. Patterson has expressed her opinion that "Turkey is seen as answer to Saudis' influence in Pakistan keeping that in view Turkey announced an aid package of USD 110 million for the Swat Valley IDPs in Pakistan and was the only Muslim country to announce such a package. Turkey is well-positioned to be a much more positive role model for the Pakistanis and to neutralize somewhat the more negative influence on Pakistani politics and society exercised by Saudi Arabia."

== Lebanon-Saudi relations ==
Foreign Minister Prince Saud al-Faisal proposed to David M. Satterfield, the U.S. special adviser to Iraq, that an Arab force supported by U.S. and NATO air power could fight Hezbollah in Lebanon. Saud expressed his fears that a Hezbollah victory in Beirut would mean the end of the Siniora government and the 'Iranian takeover' of Lebanon. He accused the U.N. troops in Lebanon of "sitting doing nothing". Saudi Arabia's Information Minister and former ambassador to Lebanon, Abdul Aziz Khoja has called Iranian-backed Hezbollah evil.

== Saudi-Yemen relations ==
Saudi Assistant Interior Minister, Prince Muhammad bin Nayef, described "Yemen as a dangerous failed state and a growing threat to Saudi Arabia because it attracts Al Qaida and many Yemenis were more sympathetic to Al Qaida than Afghans." He also said "Yemeni President Saleh is losing control, and outlined a Saudi strategy of co-opting Yemeni tribes with assistance projects". The insurgent Houthi tribes were "Takfiri and Shi'a 'like Hizballah South'. This was a threat forming around Saudi Arabia that required action now. The Saudis are funding projects in Yemeni tribal areas so the tribal leaders eject radicals."

== Anti-Shiism as Saudi foreign policy ==
Iraqi officials have noted that frequent anti-Shia outbursts from Saudi religious figures are often allowed to circulate without sanction or disapproval from the Saudi leadership, moreover Wahabbi Sunni Islam condones religious incitement against Shia. The Saudis have traditionally viewed Iraq as a Sunni-dominated bulwark against the spread of Shiism and Iranian political influence. In the aftermath of bombings in predominantly Shia areas across the country in 2009 that killed dozens, PM Maliki pointed publicly to one such statement, made by a Saudi imam in May, and stated, "We have observed that many governments have been suspiciously silent on the fatwa provoking the killing of Shiites."

== "Shi'a triangle" ==
An April 2009 cable claims that United Arab Emirates Foreign Minister Sheikh Abdullah bin Zayed stated there is "Saudi concern of a [Shi'a] triangle in the region between Iran, the Maliki government in Iraq, and Pakistan under Zardari."

== Saudi support for a Palestinian state ==
During French President Sarkozy's visit to Saudi Arabia, King Abdullah agreed to support the Annapolis initiative to resolve the Israeli-Palestinian conflict. Abdullah told Sarkozy that the issue of Palestinian refugees must first be resolved and that the Israelis must cease all West Bank settlement construction. Abdullah maintained that East Jerusalem must be the capital of a Palestinian state and that this section of Jerusalem must be solely under Arab control.

== Guantanamo Bay detainees ==
King Abdullah proposed that Guantanamo detainees could be monitored by "implanting detainees with an electronic chip containing information about them and allowing their movements to be tracked with Bluetooth. This was done with horses and falcons."

== Vice in Saudi Arabia ==
=== Nightlife ===
In Jeddah, despite the Committee for the Promotion of Virtue and the Prevention of Vice (CPVPV) — the religious police of Saudi Arabia, there is an ongoing underground nightlife, which includes "the full range of worldly temptations and vices" i.e., "alcohol, drugs, sex" and "working girls" (prostitutes). Even though these parties are in complete violation of CPVPV's laws, the mutaween of CPVPV are afraid to raid these parties, since these parties are hosted by the young princes of al-Saud, the monarchic ruling house of Saudi Arabia.

=== Exclusive parties ===
The Economist summarized cable descriptions of "exclusive parties" in Saudi Arabia, stating, "An American official in Saudi Arabia describes un-Islamic mores at a clandestine Halloween party, hosted by a royal prince. Alcohol and prostitutes abounded at the event, attended by 150-plus Saudis. The host's status kept the fearsome religious police away. Such parties, the writer concluded, were increasingly typical in the kingdom."

== Censorship and propaganda ==
According to a May 2009 cable, the "Saudi regulatory system offers the al-Saud regime a means to manipulate the nation's media to promote its own agenda", and criticism of the al-Saud regime is not tolerated at all. All major media outlets in Saudi Arabia — newspapers, such as Al-Watan, Al-Hayat, and Asharq Al-Awsat, and free-to-view television networks, such as MBC Group and Rotana — are owned and controlled by the al-Saud regime, and accordingly self-censorship is the order of the day — which is "motivated by profit and politics". The pro-western ideologies in these newspapers and American programming — such as Friends, Desperate Housewives, the Late Show with David Letterman and Hollywood films — are seen as an antidote to extremist religious thoughts in the recruitment of terrorists, especially young teenagers, because of the demographic target groups of these programs.

== Oil Production ==
Cables revealed that the US was warned by Sadad al Husseini, a senior Saudi government oil executive, that the country's oil reserves are overstated by as much as 300 billion barrels (40% of the claimed reserve). It is therefore not possible for Saudi Arabia to prevent the oil price from rising.
