= Harcourt Butler Sr. Sec. School =

British-era school in New Delhi, India

Harcourt Butler Senior Secondary School
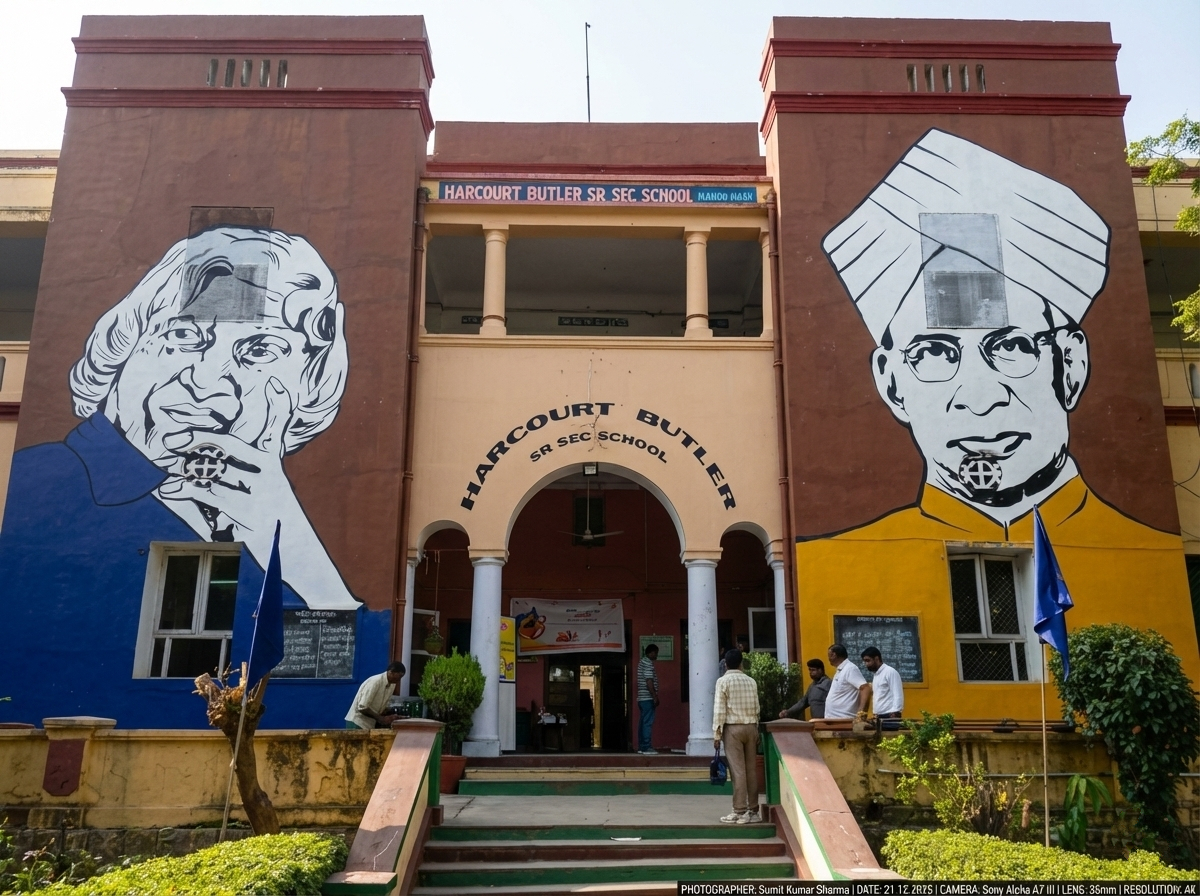

Location
- Mandir Marg; New Delhi, NCT of Delhi, 110 001; India; 28°38′00″N 77°11′58″E

Information
- Type: Govt aided
- Established: 1917
- Founder: Sir Spencer Harcourt Butler
- School board: Central Board of Secondary Education
- Principal: Mr. Sameer Kumar Gangarh
- Gender: Boys
- Campus type: Urban
- Alumni: Butlerians
- Website: harcourtbutlerschool.com

Harcourt Butler Senior Secondary School (HBSSS) is an old boys school at Mandir Marg (erstwhile Reading Road) in Delhi, India. The school is aided by the Government of Delhi, and is affiliated to the Central Board of Secondary Education. It is one of the oldest schools in Delhi, and has been awarded a heritage prize by the Govt of Delhi.

It provides education from Class 1 to Class 12 offering three streams of Science (Physics, Chemistry, Mathematics, Biology), Commerce, and Arts in English and Hindi languages. This is the only Govt aided school providing the Engineering drawing subject (as optional) for class 11th and 12th.

== History ==
The school was founded in 1889 by a Bengali society, and was originally known as Bengali Boys School. The matriculation exams were conducted by the University of the Punjab.

In 1917, the British government took over its control, and started funding its operations for the wards of British India Government employees. The existing structure of Harcourt Butler School was set up by Sir Spencer Harcourt Butler in 1917. Sir Harcourt was the first Member for Education in the Viceroy’s Executive Council in British India. Pre World War II, the school used to operate from Delhi for the six months in winter, and from Shimla for the six months in summer, as the capital of British India would move annually.

In 2010s, its premises were decorated with art by the Delhi Street Art of Yogesh Saini.

=== Head of Institution ===
S.No.	Name	From	To
1.	S.P. Mukherji	01-04-1925	30-11-1945
2.	C.G. Mathur	01-12-1945	31-03-1947
3.	Mr. S. Lal	01-04-1947	30-04-1965
4.	Hira Lal	01-05-1965	30-04-1969
5.	S.L. Puri (Officiating)	01-05-1969	31-08-1970
6.	Uma Shanker (Officiating)	01-09-1970	30-04-1972
7.	S.M. Sharma (Officiating)	01-05-1972	31-08-1972
8.	J.C. Goel	01-09-1972	31-05-1995
9.	H.B.S. Rana (Officiating)	01-06-1995	30-09-1995
10.	D.N. Mehta	01-10-1995	31-03-2002
11.	B.K. Sethi	01-04-2002	30-04-2004
12.	Alka Chaudhry	01-05-2004	31-05-2017
13.	Neera Rao	01-06-2017	30-06-2022
14.	B. Kapila (Officiating)	01-07-2022	07-08-2022
15.	Chetram (V-Principal)	08-08-2022	30-06-2025
16.	Sameer Kumar Gangarh	02-07-2025	Incumbent

== Notable alumni ==
- Satish Kaushik
- Gajraj Rao
- Surinder Amarnath
- Mohinder Amarnath
- Nirmal Verma
- Hari Krishna Shastri
- Nasir Aslam Zahid
- Rajesh Puri
- Bhupinder Singh Hooda
