= R. B. Whitehead =

British numismatist

Whitehead, Richard Bertram
- Born: 6 November 1879; Liverpool
- Died: 4 March 1967 (aged 87)
- Education: Liverpool College
- Alma mater: Exeter College, Oxford

Richard Bertram Whitehead (6 November 1879 – 4 March 1967), usually cited as R. B. Whitehead, was a British numismatist and an authority on Indian coins. He played "a major role in establishing the study of coinage as an essential technique of Indian historical research", for which he received numerous awards and honours, and was the first Honorary Fellow of the Numismatic Society of India.

== Biography ==
Whitehead was born in Liverpool. His father was the Reverend Robert Whitehead. He attended Liverpool College, and won an Open Scholarship in Mathematics to Exeter College, Oxford. In 1902 he was selected for the Indian Civil Service, and came to specialise in "Settlement" work - the periodic reassessments of land revenue - and through this work came to understand the historical interest of the coin finds that were being made in the Punjab at the time. In 1907 he became official examiner of treasure trove for the Punjab Government. To bring together scattered research, in 1910 he and six others took part in a meeting at Allahabad at which was founded the Numismatic Society of India. The other six were Sir John Stanley, the Revd Dr G.P. Taylor, Framji Jamaspjee Thanawala, Richard Burn, H.R. Nevill and H. Nelson Wright. Whitehead was elected both Honorary Secretary and Treasurer of the society.

After his retirement from the Punjab in 1922, Whitehead settled in Cambridge. He married Margaret Elizabeth, widow of James Hector Barnes, I.C.S., and daughter of Col. F.T. Ebden, of the Indian Army. He was elected a Fellow-Commoner of St John's College, Cambridge, and for many years was Advisor to Indian Students at Cambridge. He was active in the Royal Numismatic Society, and was elected Foreign Secretary in 1943, Vice-President in 143, and Hon Vice-President in 1953. He also presided over the Oriental Section of the International Numismatic Congress in London in 1936.

Coins from the Whitehead Collection are in the British Museum (purchased in 1922). His papers are in the Fitzwilliam Museum, Cambridge.

== Honours ==
Allan was elected a Corresponding Member of the American Numismatic Society in 1921, awarded a special silver medal of the Indian Numismatic Society in 1922, and the bronze medal of that society in 1934. He was awarded the medal of the Royal Numismatic Society in 1940, the Huntington Medal of the American Numismatic Society in 1946, and the Campbell Memorial Gold Medal of the Asiatic Society of Bombay in 1962. He was made an Honorary Member of the International Numismatic Commission in 1953, and in 1966 was elected the first Honorary Fellow of the Numismatic Society of India.

== Publications ==
Whitehead published in the Journal of the Asiatic Society of Bengal (JASB), the Journal of the Numismatic Society of India (JNSI), the Journal of the Panjab Historical Society (JPHS), the Journal of the Royal Asiatic Society (JRAS), the Numismatic Chronicle (NC), and the Numismatic Supplement to the Journal of the Asiatic Society of Bengal (NS). Whitehead wrote numerous books, articles and reviews, of which the following is a selection:

=== Books ===
- Catalogue of the Collection of Coins illustrative of the History of the Rulers of Delhi up to 1858 AD in the Delhi Museum of Archaeology (Calcutta, 1910)
- Report on the Administration of the Delhi Crown Lands (Lahore, 1910)
- Catalogue of Coins in the Punjab Museum, Lahore: (i) Indo-Greek Coins, (ii) Coins of the Mughal Emperors (Oxford, 1914)
- Customary Law of the Ambala District [Punjab Customary Law X] (Lahore, 1916)
- The Pre-Mohammedan Coinage of Northwestern India [ANS Numismatic Notes and Monographs 13] (New York, 1922)
- Catalogue of the Coins in the Punjab Museum, Lahore: (iii) Coins of Nadir Shah and the Durrani Dynasty (Oxford, 1934)

=== Articles ===
- "The Mughal Mint of Gokulgarh", JASB, ns xi (68), 1909, 329-330
- "Old Coins in the Bahawalpur State Toshakhana", JASB, ns xi (69), 1909, 331-346
- "Dams of Akbar struck at Jaunpur and Ajmer mints", JASB, ns xiii (80), 1910, 242-244
- "Some rare Indo-Greek and Scythian Coins", JASB, ns xiv (82), 1910, 557-565
- "Some rare Coins of the Pathán Sultáns of Dehli", JASB, ns xiv (83), 1910, 565-569
- "Notes on some Mughal Coins", JASB, ns xv (89), 1910, 651-656
- "Dams of Akbar struck at Jaunpur and Ajmer mints" and "Some rare Pathän coins", JASB, ns xv (94), 1910, 691
- "On an unpublished Mediaeval Coin", JASB, ns xvi (97), 1911, 700-701
- "Shamsu-d-din Mahmud Shah of Dehli", JASB, ns xvii (102), 1912, 123-124
- "A Coin of 'Azimu-sh-shãn", JASB, ns xvii (103), 1912, 124-127
- "The Mint Towns of the Mughal Emperors of India", JASB, viii, no. 11, 1912, 425-527
- "Coins of Shah Shuja, son of Shah Jahan", JASB, ns xx (116), 1912, 533-535
- "A new Pathan Sultan of Dehli", JPHS i (1911–12), 81-82
- "The Place of Coins in Indian History", JPHS ii, 1913, 5-20
- "A Find of Ephthalite or White Hun Coins", JASB, ns xxi (122), 1913, 481-483
- "Two Coins of Soter Megas, the Nameless King", JRAS 1913, 658-661
- "First Supplement to The Mint Towns of the Mughal Emperors of India", JASB, ns XXV (147), 1915, 231-237
- "An Inscription of the Reign of Ghiyathu-d-din Balban", JPHS, iv, 1, 1916, 12-16
- "The Official Seal of Prince Aczam Shãh", JASB, ns xxxv (213), 1921, 18
- (with S.H. Hodivala) "The Coins of Muhammad Akbar as Claimant to the Mughal Throne", JASB, ns xxxvi (227), 1922, 3-7
- "Some Notable Coins of the Mughal Emperors of India, part 1", NC 1912, 115-149
- "Notes on Indo-Greek Numismatic", NC 1923, 294-343
- "Some Notable Coins of the Mughal Emperors of India, part 2", NC, 361-416
- "The Portrait Medals and Zodiacal Coins of the Emperor Jahangir, part 1. The Portrait Medals", NC, 1929, 1-25
- "Akbar II as Pretender : a Study in Anarchy", JRAS, 1929, 259-272
- "Some Notable Coins of the Mughal Emperors of India, part 3", NC, 1930, 199-220
- "The Portrait Medals and Zodiacal Coins of the Emperor Jahangir, part 2 The Zodiacal Coins", NC, 1931, 91-130
- "The River Courses of the Panjab and Sind", The Indian Antiquary lxi, 1932, 163-169
- "The River Courses of the Panjab and Sind" (summary) in Actes du XVIIIe Congrès internationale des Orientalistes (Leiden, 1932), 153-154
- "The Gold Coins of the Sultans of Kashmir", NC, 1933, 257-267
- "Mir Ja'far's Plassey Medal", NC, 1935, 127-134
- "The Coins of Nadir Shah and the Durrani Dynasty", JASB, ns xlvi (337), 1936, 107-110
- "Multan: The House of Gold", NC, 1937, 60-72
- "Three Coin Collections", JASB, ns xlvii (350), 1937, 139-145
- "Multan : The House of Gold" in Transactions of the International Numismatic Congress, 1936 (London, 1938) 448-52
- "Notes on the Indo-Greeks", NC, 1940, 89-122
- "The Eastern Satrap Sophytes", NC, 1943, 60-72
- "James Lewis alias Charles Masson", NC, 1943, 96-97
- "The dynasty of the General Aspavarma", NC, 1944, 99-104
- "Notes on the Indo-Greeks, part 2", NC 1947, 28-51
- "The So-called Sun-God of Multan" in India Antiqua, a volume of Oriental Studies presented by his friends and pupils to Jean Philippe Vogel, C.I. E. (Leiden, 1947) 326-329
- "Notes on the Indo-Greeks, part 3", NC 1950, 205-232
- "A commentary on rare and unique coins, other than punch-marked found at Taxila between 1912 and 1934", in Sir John Marshall, Taxila ii (Cambridge, 1951), 795-842
- "Zodiacal Coins of the Emperor Jahangir" (summary) in Proceedings of the XXIIIrd International Congress of Orientalists (Cambridge, 1954) 240-241
- "Mughal medallions, JNSI, xviii, pt. 2, 1956, 210-212
- "The Bangäla couplet of Akbar", JNSI, xviii, pt. 2, 1956, 213-214
- "Coins and Indian History" in Centennial Volume of the American Numismatic Society, 1958, 697-712
- "Coins of the Jinns", NC, 1961, 181-184
- "Shamsu-d'din Mahmud of Delhi", JNSI, xxiii, 1961, 160-163
