= Thakkar =

Thakkar is an Indian family name. Alternative spellings of the name include Thakker, Thaker, Thakkar, Thakrar and Thacker. The surname is widely used in the Indian states of Gujarat, Rajasthan, Punjab and Haryana.

== Notable people ==
- Ashish Thakkar (born 1981), British businessman
- Bhavin Thakkar (born 1982), Indian cricketer
- C. K. Thakker (born 1943), Indian judge
- Fagun Thakrar (born 1991), British actress
- Jayaben Thakkar (born 1952), Indian politician
- Natwar Thakkar (1932–2018), Indian social worker
- Pankit Thakker (born 1981), Indian actor
- Praful Thakkar (born 1940), Indian collector and writer
- Rajesh Thakker (born 1954), British doctor
- Rakhee Thakrar (born 1984), British actress
- Samay Raj Thakkar (born 1966), Indian actor
- Shital Thakkar (born 1962), Indian television actress
- Tanvi Thakkar (born 1985), Indian actress
- Vaishali Thakkar (born 1964), Indian actress
- Vinita Joshi Thakkar (born 1989), Indian actress
