= Florence Nelson Wright =

Lady Harcourt Butler & Girl Guide leader

Lady Harcourt Butler
- Born: Amelia Katherine Florence Wright; 25 March 1872; Kanpur, Uttar Pradesh, India
- Died: 20 October 1951 (aged 79); London, England
- Other names: Florence Nelson Wright; Florence, Lady Butler
- Occupation: Girl Guide leader
- Spouse: Sir Spencer Harcourt Butler
- Children: Victor Spencer Butler
- Family: Harry Nelson Wright, brother

Lady Harcourt Butler (also Florence, Lady Butler) (25 March 1872 – 20 October 1951) was chief commissioner for Indian Girl Guides in the 1930s. She was recipient of the Silver Fish Award, the Girl Guiding movement's highest adult honour. She founded Les Amis de la France in Simla, a society for the "encouragement of the study of French literature, language, music and culture".

== Personal life ==
Amelia Katherine Florence Wright was born in Kanpur, Uttar Pradesh, India on 25 March 1872, to Amelia Hannah née Barnes and Francis Nelson Wright. She was the eldest of seven children.

She married Sir Spencer Harcourt Butler (1869–1938) in India on 14 July 1894, abandoning him "temporarily" before returning on their wedding day. They had one child, Victor, born in 1900. Spencer was knighted in 1911, making her Florence, Lady Butler.

In January 1914, she and Spencer sailed from Athens to India on Lord Brassey's yacht, The Sunbeam, which had cruised around the world to great acclaim 40 years previously. In August 1914, while in Simla, she arranged the collection of gifts and clothing for the war wounded. In April 1915 she left India for England for her health, staying for several months. In the same year, Sir Spencer became the Governor of Burma for the first of two postings in the position. In 1914, Lady Butler was honoured as Lady of Grace by the Order of the Hospital of St John of Jerusalem in England. Later the same year, she moved to Burma (now Myanmar) and lived in Yangon. She became a member of the East India Association.

Lady Butler and her husband had an unhappy marriage. Spencer confided in his Under Secretary, Mr Lupton, that although he and Lady Butler had been married for many years, they had "not lived together for more than eight days." To Lupton, Lady Butler gave the order "Mr Lupton, never leave me in the room with Harcourt." When Spencer died in 1938, Butler did not attend his memorial service.

== Girl Guiding ==
Lady Butler was involved with Girl Guides in India for around 30 years. In 1925 the movement was "provincialised", with Butler taking the role of provisional commissioner of the central provinces. In 1928 she presented a report on the first All-India Women's Conference (AIWC) at the World Conference. The following year she opened the All-India Girl Guides' Training Camp at Nagpur.

In 1929 Indian Girl Guiding became affiliated to Imperial headquarters in London. Butler was Chair of the All-India Executive Committee in the early 1930s and was recipient of the Silver Fish Award, Girl Guiding's highest adult honour, in 1932, for "good service to the movement". In 1933 she became Chief Commissioner of India Girl Guides, the first time the post had been filled since 1919, the post having been taken over by headquarters with the idea that Guiding in India had become too large and the movement "too scattered for any one person to be able to keep in touch with every Province." It had become clear, however, that there was a need for a local head "on the ground", hence the reinstatement of this position.

== Les Amis de la France ==
Lady Butler founded Les Amis de la France, a society for the "encouragement of the study of French literature, language, music and culture" in Simla, in 1912. It was an immediate success, and her efforts were recognized by the French Government, with the minister of the French Republic presenting her with a dinner service made of Sèvres china.
