= Butler Report =

Butler Report may refer to:

- the report of the Butler Committee (1927) on the princely states of India
- the Education Act 1944, which introduced the Tripartite System of secondary education in England and Wales
- the Butler Review, a 2004 British government inquiry into the intelligence relating to Iraq's weapons of mass destruction
