= Bhurban Accord =

Bhurban Accord (also known as the Murree Declaration) was a political agreement signed by two of Pakistan's biggest political powers, the Pakistan Peoples Party (PPP) and the Pakistan Muslim League (Nawaz) (PML-N) and was signed by co-chairman of the PPP Asif Ali Zardari and PML-N leader Nawaz Sharif. It was signed on 8 March 2008 at PC Bhurban, in the province of Punjab.

== Accord details ==
The Bhurban Accord had one primary goal. The deposed judges, sacked under President of Pakistan Pervez Musharraf when he imposed emergency rule within the country on 3 November 2007, are to be reinstated within 30 days of the new coalition government. The original date for the judges to be restored was 30 April 2008 but after no decision on which basis both the PPP and the PML-N could bring back the judges collapsed, Nawaz Sharif announced a new date on 12 May 2008. As the deadlock expired, Nawaz Sharif met with Asif Ali Zardari in London on 11 May 2008 in the final set of discussions on how to resolve the deadlock, with no effective decision made, upon his return to Islamabad, Mr. Sharif announced that his federal ministers would leave the federal government tomorrow {13 May 2008} and effectively left the coalition government. Asif Zaradari has yet to comment on the situation.

The political acumen of the twice Prime Minister of Pakistan Nawaz Sharif could not peep deep inside the shrewd Zardari while signing the declaration wherein: firstly as per clause 2, the judges were to be restored through a parliamentary resolution. Secondly, no methodology was given for disposal of the then sitting CJ Abdul Hameed Dogar and his colleague judges.

Both these things back-fired due to incompetence of the PML(N)'s advisors. When the matter got delayed, the PPP's own think tank, Barrister Aitzaz Ahsan and the then president Supreme Court Bar Association (SCBA), while addressing a press conference at Quetta on 1 April 2008 said that conspiracies were being hatched at the presidency against the Murree Declaration. It was contended that:

"The Murree accord was signed in the larger interest of the country. It guarantees independence of the judiciary and reinstatement of deposed judges. The legal fraternity did not want confrontation among institutions. Lawyers' Movement stands for strengthening of the institutions which have been weakened by former dictators [Gen Musharraf but still he was in Presidency] just to serve their personal interests. The cases of sitting judges would be decided on merit and that there would be no judicial crisis after the reinstatement of deposed judges".

== Text of the accord ==
1 – Allied parties, the Pakistan Peoples Party and the Pakistan Muslim League (N) resolve to form a coalition government for giving a practical shape to the mandate, which was given to the democratic forces by the people of Pakistan on 18 February 2008.

2 – This has been decided in today's summit between the PPP and the PML (N) that the deposed judges would be restored, on the position as they were on 2 November 2007, within 30 days of the formation of the federal government through a parliamentary resolution.

3 – The parties agreed that all allied parties would fully support the candidate for the position of the prime minister, nominated by the PPP. The PML (N) suggested that the candidate for prime minister should be such person who can take ahead the common agenda of the allied parties.

4 – The parties agreed that the speaker and the deputy speaker of the national assembly would be from the PPP while the speaker and the deputy speaker of the Punjab assembly would be from the PML (N).

5 – Both the parties agreed that the PML (N) would be a part of the federal government while the PPP would be a part of the Punjab government.

6 – This is the solid opinion of the leaderships of both the parties that the allied parties are ready for forming the governments and the sessions of the national and provincial assemblies be summoned immediately.

== 2008 election results, and coalition possibility ==
The idea of coalition government came when the PPP and the PML-N won the biggest seats in the 300-seat Parliament of Pakistan, the elections were set to be held on 8 January 2008 but were postponed until 18 February 2008 due to the assassination of former Pakistani PM Benazir Bhutto, after the elections were conducted in a peaceful manner, within the country of Pakistan, and the overall results showed that the PPP had won 93 seats with the PML-N winning 70 seats, and in total winning a number of 163 seats, and has the majority of the seats. After widespread speculation of the two parties forming a coalition government, it was finally announced on 30 February 2008, 18 days after the elections, that both parties were discussing a coalition government. Before the assassination of Ms Bhutto, she and Nawaz Sharif were discussing a coalition if they won the elections that were held supposed to be in on 8 January but no official agreement was reached. For the first time speaking after the accord was signed, Pervez Musharraf said that his government should keep personal vendettas aside, and keep politics aside, and had no problem working with a government that the people had elected.

== See also ==
- Movement to impeach Pervez Musharraf
