= Harcourt Butler =

Leading official in British India & Burma

Sir Spencer Harcourt Butler GCSI, GCIE, KStJ, DL
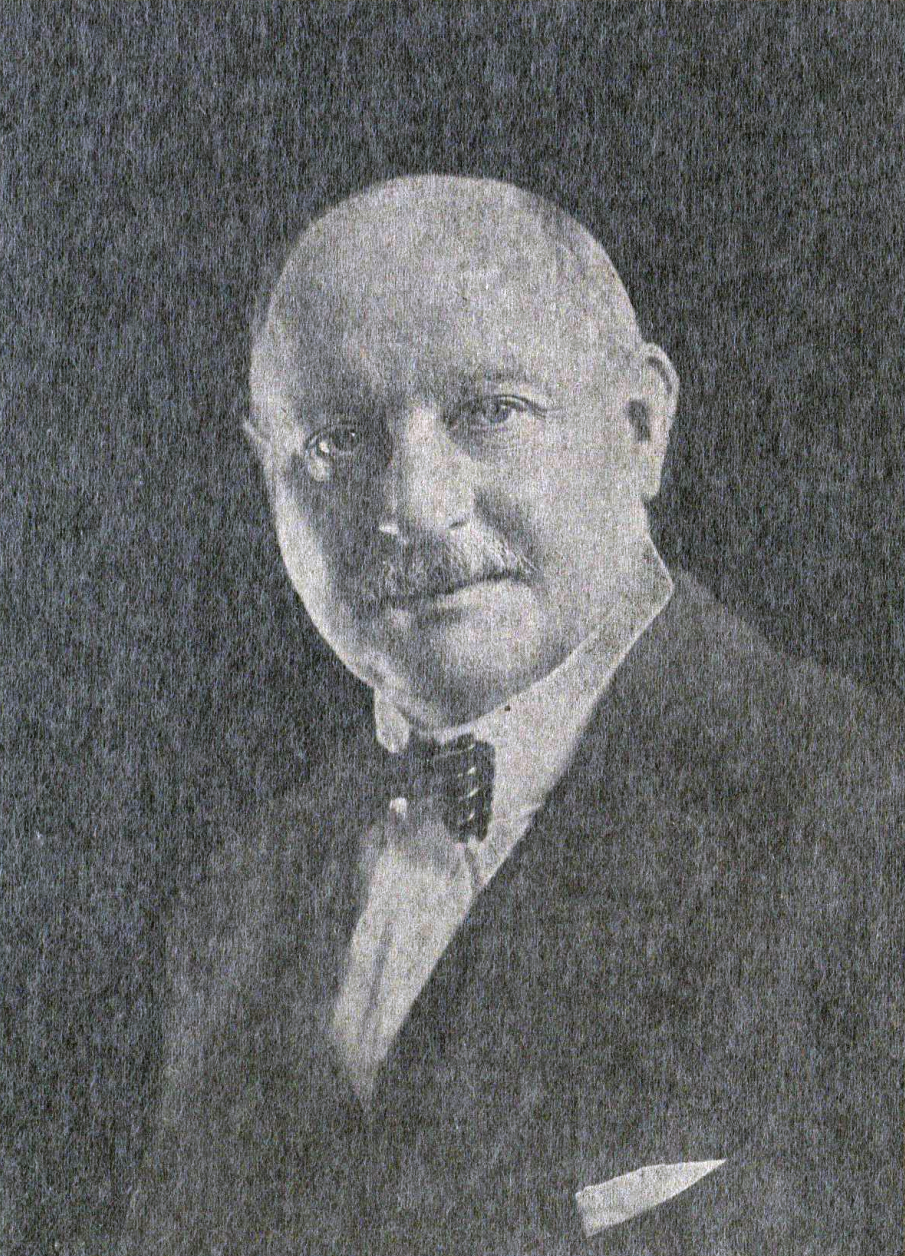

Governor of British Burma
- In office 2 January 1923 – 20 December 1927
- Preceded by: Office established
- Succeeded by: Charles Alexander Innes

Governor of United Provinces
- In office 3 January 1921 – 21 December 1922
- Preceded by: Office established
- Succeeded by: Ludovic Charles Porter

Personal details
- Born: 1 August 1869 Paddington, London, England
- Died: 2 March 1938 (aged 68) Camden, London, England
- Spouse: Amelia Katherine Florence Wright
- Relations: Montagu Butler (brother); Geoffrey G. Butler (brother); Henry Wright (brother-in-law)
- Children: Victor Spencer Butler
- Education: Harrow School; Balliol College, Oxford
- Occupation: Administrator (ICS)

Sir Spencer Harcourt Butler GCSI, GCIE, DL, FRGS, FRSA, FRAS, FZS (1 August 1869 – 2 March 1938) was a highly-regarded officer of the Indian Civil Service who held prominent posts in the Imperial Govt of India, and in multiple provinces of British India during the British Raj. He was widely considered to be one of the greatest administrators in India. His services and advice were utilised by six Governors-General of India from Lord Curzon to Lord Irwin over several decades.

He personally preferred to be addressed as "Harcourt Butler". He served as Lieutenant-Governor, and later as the first Governor, in the two provinces of UPA&O, and British Burma. He was also considered to be the possible Viceroy of India due to his exceptional record as an Indian administrator.

== Career ==
Sir Harcourt was educated at the Harrow School where his grandfather and uncle had been Head-masters for 50 years. He then joined the Balliol College at the University of Oxford (1886–90) for graduation. Sir Harcourt cleared the Indian Civil Service examination of 1888, and finished the probation in 1890 by the time he graduated. He was commissioned as an ICS officer on 4 September 1890.

=== Pre 1908 ===
Sir Harcourt came to India on 29 October 1890, and was attached to the North-Western Provinces of British India. He was given his first appointment as the Assistant Magistrate & Collector of Allahabad, the provincial capital, on 4 November 1890. He remained there till March 1892 with a brief stint in Roorkee. On 16 March 1892, he was appointed the Junior Secretary in the provincial Board of Revenue. From 9 December 1893 to 8 December 1900, he worked as in-charge of settlement operations in the three Awadh districts of Sitapur, Hardoi, and Kheri.

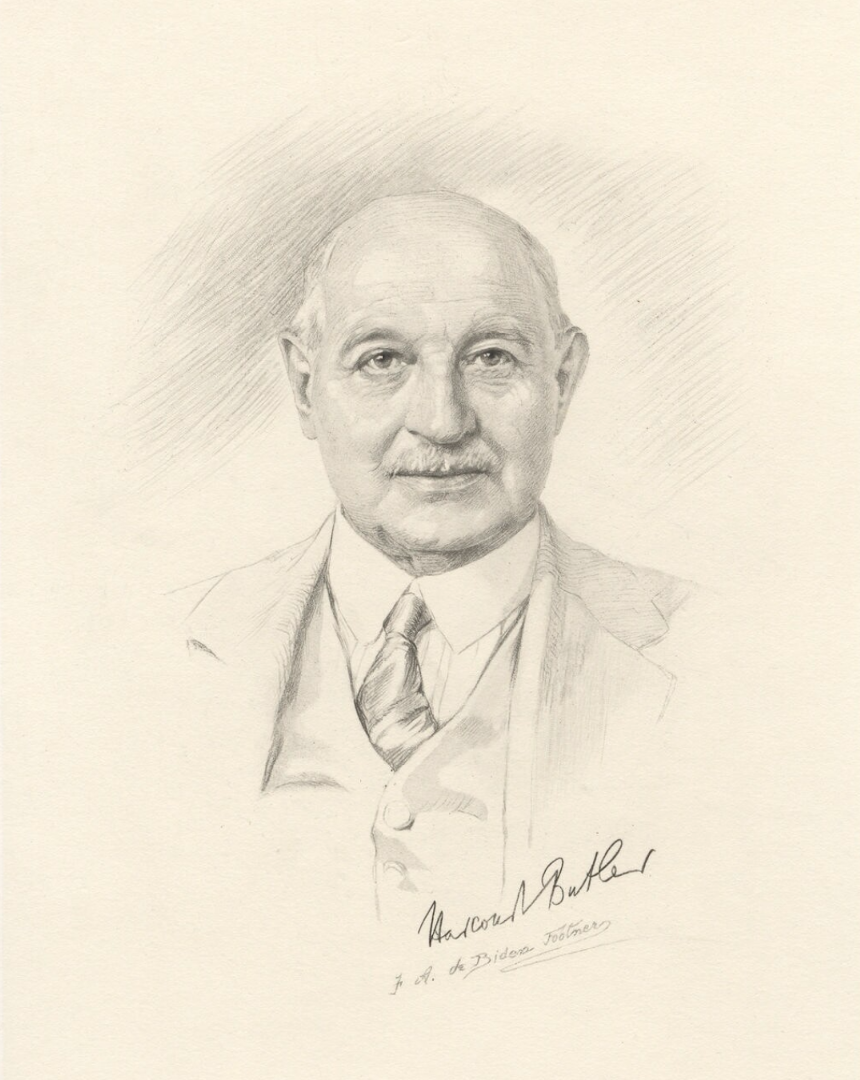
Sir Spencer Harcourt Butler, c.1934

In December 1900, Sir Harcourt was appointed Secretary to the Indian Famine Commission. His report was considered excellent, and he was made the Companion of the Order of the Indian Empire (CIE) in 1901. From May 1901 to March 1906, he held several posts for Govt of India and Govt of NWP&O. He was appointed Deputy Commissioner of Lucknow in March 1906, and remained till January 1908. Additionally, he was made Secretary to the Industrial Committee (1907–08) where his note on technical education led the discussion in the consequential Industrial Conference at Naini Tal in August 1907.

=== Post 1908 ===
In January 1908, Lord Minto appointed Sir Harcourt as Foreign Secretary to the Govt of India, after briefly making him the District Magistrate of the then Indian capital Calcutta. On 15 November 1910, he was appointed as the first Member for Education on the Viceroy's Executive Council. These central imperial postings were a substantial status upgrade from the provincial ones. As India's capital was moved from Calcutta to New Delhi, his advice was sought by the Govt of India on planning the new city. He also became the first president of Imperial Delhi Gymkhana Club, founded in 1913.

Sir Harcourt became the Lieutenant Governor of British Burma on 29 October 1915, and then the Lt.Gov. of UPA&O on 15 September 1918. He served as Governor of UPA&O from 3 January 1921 to 21 December 1922. He was then transferred to British Burma where he briefly served as Lt.Gov. before becoming the first Governor on 2 January 1923, and remaining till 20 December 1927. He retired from ICS in June 1928. Lastly, he was appointed the Chairman of the Indian States Committee (1927–29) to advise on British relations with the princely states of India.

"Sir Harcourt Butler... his brilliant career of more than forty years as an Indian administrator... His promotion in the Indian civil service came quickly. [...] His reports are standard works on various aspects of Indian life."

— The New York Times, 3 March 1938

=== Honours and legacy ===
Sir Harcourt was appointed a Companion of the Order of the Star of India (CSI) in 1909, then Knight Commander (KCSI) in 1911, and promoted to Knight Grand Commander (GCSI) of the order in the 1928 Birthday Honours. He was appointed a Companion of the Order of the Indian Empire (CIE) in November 1901, and was promoted to Knight Grand Commander (GCIE) of that order in 1923.

"Sir Harcourt Butler... was one of the greatest Indian administrators of his day. His official career was without parallel even in the wonderful records of the Indian Civil Service. It extended over nearly 40 years, and for fully half that time he held one great position after another..."

— The Times, 3 March 1938

Sir Harcourt was a prominent advocate of industrial advancement and education in India, particularly scientific and technical education. He supported and helped Banares Hindu University, University of Lucknow, Aligarh Muslim University, University of Rangoon, and University of Medicine 1, Yangon. The Harcourt Butler Technological Institute in Kanpur was named after Sir Harcourt in 1926 as he was its relentless chief proponent. The Harcourt Butler School in New Delhi was also re-named after him in 1917.

== Personal life ==
Sir Harcourt was born on 1 August 1869 in Paddington, in central London, England, and died on 2 March 1938 in London at age 68. He was the fourth child (and second son) of Spencer Perceval Butler, and Mary Butler (née Kendall). His parents had 13 children in total, 11 of whom survived childhood. His elder brother Sir Cyril Kendall Butler, KBE, JP, was Treasurer and Chairperson of Contemporary Art Society. His younger brothers included the ICS officer Sir Montagu Butler and the British MP Sir G.G.G. Butler. His paternal grandfather, George Butler, and his paternal uncle, Henry Montagu Butler, were both headmasters of Harrow School.

=== Family ===
Sir Harcourt married Florence Wright on 14 July 1894 in London. She was the daughter of ICS officer Francis Nelson Wright. Sir Harcourt and Florence had an unhappy marriage, and she did not even attend his funeral. They had one son, Victor Spencer Butler, born on 15 August 1900.

=== Later years ===
Post retirement, Sir Harcourt involved himself with the Royal Central Asian Society, and became Vice-Chairman of its council in the first half of 1930s. However, in his 60s he started suffering physical maladies, but still kept his mental faculties intact. He had recurring periods of illness, and ultimately succumbed to one such episode on 2 March 1938.

== See also ==
- Lord Minto (Gilbert Elliot), the Viceroy of India
- Sir Antony MacDonnell, Lt.Gov. of NWP, and President of the Indian Famine Commission
- Sir John Prescott Hewett, Lt.Gov. of UPA&O

Government offices
Preceded by Sir George Shaw	Lieutenant Governor of British Crown Colony of Burma; 1915–1917	Succeeded by Walter Francis Rice
Preceded by Sir James Scorgie Meston	Lieutenant Governor of United Provinces of Agra and Oudh; 1918–1920	Succeeded by last incumbent
Preceded by first incumbent	Governor of United Provinces of Agra and Oudh; 1921–1922	Succeeded by Sir Ludovic Charles Porter
Preceded by Sir Reginald Henry Craddock	Lieutenant Governor of British Crown Colony of Burma; 1922–1923	Succeeded by last incumbent
Preceded by first incumbent	Governor of British Crown Colony of Burma; 1923–1927	Succeeded by Sir Charles Alexander Innes
