= The Oath of Office (Judges) Order, 2000 =

Pakistani law

The Oath of Judges Order 2000 is order issued by then Chief Executive of Pakistan General Pervez Musharraf in January 2000. It required the judges to take a fresh oath of office swearing allegiance to military rule. Judges must swear that they will make no decisions against the military rule.

Many judges including Chief Justice Saeeduzzaman Siddiqui and 13 Supreme Court judges including Justice Nasir Aslam Zahid refused to take the fresh oath and all of them were dismissed by General Musharraf.

The order was issued the day before the Nawaz Sharif trial was set to resume in Karachi, and less than one week before the Supreme Court was set to hear legal challenges to Gen. Musharraf's emergency proclamation and his provisional constitutional orders.
