= Praful Thakkar =

Indian collector (born 1940)

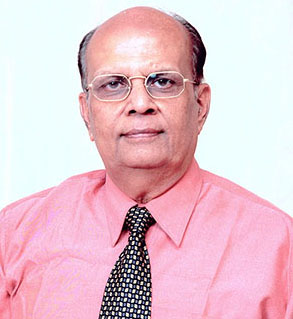
- Born: February 25, 1940 (age 86); Mumbai, Maharashtra, India
- Occupations: Retired Indian Administrative Officer, Author, Hobbyist

Praful Thakkar (born February 25, 1940) is an Indian collector of autographs, philately, First Day Covers (FDCs), coins, medals, tokens, badges, badge plates and other collectibles from India. He has written several books on his hobbies.

== Education and career ==
Praful attended Gokuldas Tejpal High School, Bombay. He was a General Secretary of the Students’ Union and Co-operative Stores run by the students. He later attended the Tatwagnan Vidyapeeth in Thane, Maharashtra, an institute established by the founder of the Swadhyaya Movement, Pandurang Shastri Athavale. Thakkar studied Indian and Western philosophy. After graduation, he took part in various competitive examinations for government administrative assignments. He worked as an I.A.S. officer serving the Government of Gujarat in various administrative capacities.

== Books ==
Thakkar has published several books, including collector's guides in the areas of numismatics, philately, and autographs. These include Collector's Guide to Indian Canteen Tokens, Collector's Guide to Membership Badges of Turf & Race Clubs of India, Collector's Guide to Chronologies of Sultans, Rulers & Colonial Heads of India, Chapras: Collector's Guide to Belt Buckles, Badges and Badge Plates of India, Collector's Guide to Covers & Folders of India 1947-1964 - Official & Private, and Glimpses of Indian Autographs.

He has also written on Indian culture, and translated Sanskrit poetry.

== Awards, prizes and media recognitions ==
1. Felicitated in Sept. 2008 with Life Time Achievement Award for outstanding contributions to Indian Numismatics, at Indore in the 92nd Annual Conference of the Numismatic Society of India, Banaras (Varanasi) which includes the Numismatic Society of India Varanasi, the Indian Coin Society, Nagpur and the Gwalior chapter INTACH.
2. Awarded Life Time Achievement Award by Gujarat Coin Society, Ahmedabad at their Annual General Meeting in June 2009.
3. The last philately book Collector’s Guide to First Day Covers & Folders of India 1947-1964 Official & Private has received 6 awards in International Philatelic Exhibitions at Portugal 2010, Joberg 2010, Johannesburg- South Africa, Napex 2011, Washington-USA, Chicagopex 2011, Chicago-USA, PhilaNippon 2011, Tokyo-Japan and Indonesia 2012.
4. Received various Medals at Stamps of India National Exhibition, New Delhi in 2010 & 2011 and Gujarat Philatelic Exhibition GUJPEX 2011 at Baroda, Gujarat, India.
5. Received Trophy in the Exhibition organized by South Indian Philatelic & Numismatic Dealers Association at Chennai in 2006 for displaying Autographs of Presidents and Prime Ministers of India.
6. In 2011, Shree Lohana Maha Parishad, Ahmedabad has awarded him an International level ‘Vishisht Raghuvanshi Pratibha Award’ recognising and appreciating his vivid activities and hobbies.
7. Received Prizes for Exhibits of (A) Cash Coupons of Indian Princely States (B) Presentation Medals of Viceroys of India at the exhibitions organized by International Society of Collectors of Rare Items, Pune.
8. Received Trophies for Exhibits of (A) Commemorative Medals of Royal Visits of British Rulers to India (B) Indian Temperance Medals at the exhibitions organized by Gujarat Coin Society, Ahmedabad, the Numismatic Society of India, Varansi at Chandigarh 2005 and at Money Mela 2008 organised by Indian Coin Society at Indore in September 2008.
9. Rainbow stamp blog club news highlighting Praful's achievements
10. Gullak Magazine coverage
11. Philately book was reviewed and welcome by following Philatelic Magazines of USA & UK. (a) Philatelic Literature Review, Pennsylvania USA (b) FIRST DAYS-Journal of the American First Day Cover Society, USA (c) The Philatelic Communicator, Journal of American Philatelic Society, USA (d) The London Philatelist, Journal of the Royal Philatelic Society London, United Kingdom in its issue number 1386 of June 2011.
12. Website indianautographs.com has received 'World Web Award of Excellence' from Art Space 2000 in 2007.
13. Times of India Ahmedabad Mirror - Token of Love
14. Greyhoundderby.com Race Club Badges
15. Autograph hobby interview on ETv
16. Autograph exhibition coverage n ETv
17. Chapras collection interview on ETv
18. Her Excellency Gujarat Governor releasing the book - Glimpses of Indian Autographs
