= Numismatic Society of India =

The Numismatic Society of India (NSI) is the foremost numismatic society in India. It was founded in 1910 by a group of (mainly) expatriate Englishmen associated with British rule in India. The founding members were Rev. G.P. Taylor, Sir Richard Burn, H.R. Nevil, H.N. Wright, R.B. Whitehead and Framji Thanawala. The first President was Sir John Stanley, Chief Justice of the Allahabad High Court. R. B. Whitehead was the first Honorary Fellow of the Numismatic Society of India. NSI is situated within the Banaras Hindu University campus.

== Selected publications ==
Journal (digitised editions only)

- The journal of the Numismatic Society of India Vol. I, 1939. (1972 reprint)
- The journal of the Numismatic Society of India Vol. III, 1941. (1973 reprint)
- The journal of the Numismatic Society of India Vol. VII, 1945, Parts I & II. Professor H.S. Hodiwala commemoration volume. (1976 reprint)

Index

- Gupta, Parmeshwari Lal. (1950) Index to the Journal of the Numismatic Society of India Vols. I to X (1939–1948). Bombay: The Numismatic Society of India.

== Medals and awards ==
The Numismatic Society of India recognizes academic achievement by conferring the following awards:

- Nelson Wright Medal in Bronze
- Akbar Silver Medal
- Chakra Vikram Medal of Gold and Silver
- C.H. Bidulph Bronze Medal
- Prof. M. Rama Rao Medal
- Shree T. Desikachari Silver Medal
- Prof. M.H. Krishna-Mythic Society Silver Medal
