= H. Nelson Wright =

Indian civil servant and numismatist

Henry Nelson Wright (1869–1941) was a British civil servant in India and a numismatist, specialising in Indian numismatics, for which he is best known.

== Early life and education ==
Henry Nelson Wright was born on 29 October 1869 in Mainpuri, India, the third son of Francis Nelson Wright, a member of the Indian Civil Service who had been a King's Scholar at Eton. Henry followed his father’s path in education and choice of career, entering Eton on a King’s Scholarship where he was a sporting as well as academic success, playing the Wall Game. He took the Indian Civil Service entrance exam while still at Eton, competing against candidates who had already obtained university degrees, and passed out near the top. He then went as an Exhibitioner to Corpus Christi College, Oxford where he spent two years reading Classics.

== Career ==
In September 1890 Henry sailed for India and took up his first posting at Meerut, in the North West Provinces as Assistant Magistrate and Collector. In 1896 he received the significant promotion to Under Secretary to the Government. In 1899, after nine months home leave, he was promoted to Director of Land Records and Agriculture and Joint Secretary to the Board of Revenue and then in 1901 to be Registrar at the High Court in Allahabad. He spent his entire career in India, except for a period in London from 1917 - 1919 working at the India Office after which he returned to India and was appointed as Judge First Grade at the High Court in Bareilly. He retired in 1925.

== Personal life and family ==
In 1892 Henry married Edith Stuckey – a relative of the Somerset banking dynasty who founded Stuckeys Bank. They had four children, Isola, whose son-in-law was Major-General Roy Urquhart of Arnhem, Harcourt, Trevor and Innes. Harcourt, also a King's Scholar of Eton, was named after his godfather, Henry’s great friend Sir Spencer Harcourt Butler who married his sister Florence and subsequently became Governor of Burma and the United Provinces. Edith died of cancer on 13 December 1917. Six months later, in September 1918, Harcourt was killed on the Western Front, aged 19. In 1919 Henry remarried Minnie Barnes (known as Madge) whom he had met while in London and went back to India with her, where a daughter Alison was born. On retirement, he returned to England where he died of cancer on 13 May 1941.

== Numismatics ==
He became a member of the Asiatic Society of Calcutta in 1894 and grew interested in Indian coins. Appointed the Society’s secretary, he began editing the Supplements to its Journal and in 1902 edited the first supplement devoted to Numismatics. Seeing that coin collecting was being ‘perused haphazardly by individuals, mostly government officers’ he took it upon himself to bring in more organisation and called a conference at his house in Allahabad in December 1910. Henry began focusing on the coins of the Mughal Empire in India and published his first book The Sultans of Delhi in 1907. He was also founding member of the Numismatic Society of India whose first meeting was held in his house in Allahabad. The Society is still in existence and awards an annual Nelson Wright Medal for academic work in Numismatics.

After 1919 his main concentration was coins - sorting collections and producing catalogues at the museums in Calcutta, Delhi, Lucknow. On retirement, he bought a house at Upper Warlingham. The Larches was chosen for its proximity to London and the British Museum where he spent his time studying and sorting the Islamic coins.

In addition to Islamic coins which he collected which can be seen in the Delhi Museum and other museums with coin collections in India, he gave his own collection to the British Museum in 1939 where his Islamic and Gupta coins can presently be seen.

He was a Fellow of the Royal Numismatic Society, and a founder member of the Indian Numismatic Society, and both societies recognized his contribution to the field by awarding him gold medals. The Numismatic Society of India now awards the Nelson Wright Medal for academic work in numismatics.

== Awards and honours ==
- Awarded the Medal of the Royal Numismatic Society.
- Awarded the gold medal of the Numismatic Society of India in 1932.

== Publications ==
- 1906-28 (with Vincent Arthur Smith, and John Allan), Catalogue of the coins in the Indian Museum, Calcutta : including the Cabinet of the Asiatic Society of Bengal
- Wright, H. Nelson (1907). Catalogue of the Coins in the Indian Museum Calcutta Volume II Part I. The Sultans of Dehli Part II. Contemporary Dynasties in India. Trustees of the Indian Museum: Internet Archive.
- Wright, H. Nelson (1908). Catalogue of the Coins in the Indian Museum Calcutta Volume III Mughal Emperors of India. Trustees of the Indian Museum: Internet Archive.
- Wright, H. Nelson (1931). "THE COINAGE OF THE SULṬĀNS OF MĀLWĀ". The Numismatic Chronicle and Journal of the Royal Numismatic Society. 11 (44). JSTOR: 291–312. JSTOR 42664272.
- Wright, H. Nelson (1932). "THE COINAGE OF THE SULṬĀNS OF MĀLWĀ (Continued)". Numismatic Chronicle and Journal of the Royal Numismatic Society. 12 (45). JSTOR: 13–53. JSTOR 42664284.
- Coins of the Mughal Emperors of India (reprint 1975)
- Wright, H. Nelson (1936). The coinage and metrology of the Sult̤āns of Dehlī : incorporating a catalogue of the coins in the author's cabinet now in the Dehlī Museum. Government of India: Internet Archive.

== Bibliography ==
- Urquhart, Judy (2022). Henry Nelson Wright Numismatist and Indian Civil Servant. Judy Urquhart. ISBN 979-8842868667.
