= Nasir Aslam Zahid =

Pakistani judge (born 1934)

Nasir Aslam Zahid ناصر اسلم زاہد

Chief Justice of the Sindh High Court
- In office 23 May 1992 – 15 April 1994
- Preceded by: Saeeduzzaman Siddiqui
- Succeeded by: Abdul Hafeez Memon (Acting)

Personal details
- Born: 3 February 1934 (age 92) Mussoorie, British India (now in Uttarakhand, India)
- Education: Government College University, Lahore; Fitzwilliam College, Cambridge; Inns of Court School of Law

Supreme Court of Pakistan

Nasir Aslam Zahid (Urdu:ناصر اسلم زاہد); Barrister-at-Law, is a Pakistani former judge who served as the Chief Justice of the Sindh High Court and then a judge of the Federal Shariat Court of Pakistan and the Supreme Court of Pakistan.

He did his Bachelors from Government College University Lahore. He left Pakistan in 1954 for Cambridge for further studies and returned in 1957.

He gained further respect and admiration when he resigned from the Supreme Court of Pakistan instead of taking the oath of office per military dictator General Pervez Musharraf's Provisional Constitutional Order (PCO).

== Early life ==
Nasir Aslam Zahid was born in Mussoorie, near Delhi, British India. His father, Sir Zahid Hussain was a finance officer, and had also served as chancellor of Aligarh Muslim University. Later in Pakistan, his father was the first governor of the State Bank of Pakistan. He had a very supportive family of 9.

His uncle was a criminal lawyer who used to tell him stories about his daily cases. These stories built his interest in this field and that's when he decided to practice law.

== Education ==
Nasir Aslam Zahid matriculated from Saint Patrick's High School, Karachi, did his BA degree at Government College Lahore, and went on to the University of Cambridge to study law and received a Bachelor's degree there. In 1956, he was called to the Bar from the Middle Temple. He completed his degree in 1957 and came back to Pakistan.

== Career ==
In 1957, Barrister Zahid enrolled as an advocate of the Sindh High Court, and of the Supreme Court of Pakistan in 1962. He was then promoted to the Bench of the Sindh High Court as an Additional Judge in 1980, and in 1983 was made a permanent judge of the Sindh High Court. The Pakistan Peoples Party government temporarily removed him from the Bench in 1988 to send him off on deputation as the federal law secretary, a post he held until June 1990 when he returned to the Sindh High Court. From January 1991 to the end of April of that year, he moved to the Supreme Court as an ad hoc Judge. He had several spells as 'acting Chief Justice of Sindh', during the absence of the sitting Chief Justice, and in May 1992 took over as permanent Chief Justice.

By 1994, Justice Zahid's independence could be tolerated no more by the harsh law enforcement agencies, backed by the executive wing of the government. Zahid granted no concessions to the agencies or the government prosecuting authorities. He was transferred to the Federal Shariat Court on 16 April 1994, without his consent, for a period of two years. Later he was elevated as a permanent judge of the Supreme Court of Pakistan. However, he continued his contributions towards the dispensing of justice to the people of Pakistan until the year 2000, and then resigned from the Supreme Court of Pakistan instead of taking the oath of the office as ordered by General. Pervez Musharraf's Provisional Constitutional Order (PCO), which would have required the judges never to find illegality in the new government, no matter what actions the government took.

== Contributions and social activities ==
He is involved in human rights issues and judicial education, and has spent much of his time since his retirement on dealing with women’s legal concerns. He has been serving as Dean, Faculty of Legal Studies, and Head of Hamdard School of Law at the Hamdard University, Karachi, since October 2000.

Justice Zahid collaborated with the Government of Sindh, Pakistan, for the establishment of a 'Committee for the Welfare of Women Prisoners' at the Special Prison for Women at Karachi. However, in 2009, the work was expanded to include Juveniles and Male Prisoners of all 22 prisons in Sindh.

In November 2006, former Justice Nasir Aslam Zahid and Naib Nazim, City of Karachi, Nasreen Jalil announced plans to provide full legal assistance to women victims of domestic violence.

In November 2001, Governor, State Bank of Pakistan Ishrat Hussain along with Nasir Aslam Zahid announced plans to set up an annual award in memory of Nasir Aslam Zahid's father Zahid Hussain. This award would be given to deserving students and State Bank of Pakistan employees on merit basis. The family of Zahid Hussain and the State Bank of Pakistan would provide funds for this annual award.

== See also ==
- Supreme Court of Pakistan
- Zahid Hussain (banker) (Nasir Aslam Zahid's father)
- Saeeduzzaman Siddiqui

Legal offices
Preceded by Saeeduzzaman Siddiqui	Chief Justice of the Sindh High Court; 1992–1994	Succeeded by Abdul Hafeez Memon; Acting
