= Citizens' Group on Electoral Process =

The Citizens' Group on Electoral Process (CGEP) is a Pakistani organisation created to ensure that free, fair and credible elections take place in the country. The first Chairman of the CGEP was Chief Justice (R) Saeeduzzaman Siddiqui.
