= Butler Committee (1927) =

Committee of the Government of the United Kingdom

The Harcourt Butler Committee under the chairmanship of Sir Harcourt Butler was appointed in 1927 to investigate and clarify the relationship between the paramount power of the British Raj in India, and the rulers of Princely States. The two other members were, William Searle Holdsworth and Sidney Peel.

The committee visited 16 States and submitted its report in 1929.

== Context ==
The question of sovereignty and paramountcy was undefined at the time. There was a growing call among the princely states to clarify the term paramountcy.

== Recommendations ==
In the committee's report of 1929, the "paramountcy" doctrine was reaffirmed. Guidelines were given for its application, and it was made clear that the financial relationship between the Raj and the States should be fair.

1. The relationship of the princely states with the British empire was not merely a contractual relationship, but a living, growing relationship shaped by the circumstances and policy, resting on the mixture of history and theory.
2. British paramountcy to stay intact(solid) to preserve the princely state.
3. State should not be transferred without their own consent to a relationship with a new government in British India responsible to an Indian legislature.
