= Richard Burn (Indologist) =

English civil servant, Indologist, and numismatist

Sir Richard Burn, as photographed by Walter Stoneman, 1940.

Sir Richard Burn CSI (1 February 1871 – 26 July 1947) was an English civil servant in British India, historian of India and numismatist. He was the editor of Volume IV of The Cambridge History of India and contributed four chapters to Volume VI of that work on the Indian political situation after 1900.

== Early life ==
Burn was born in Liverpool, educated at the Liverpool Institute, then at Christ Church College, University of Oxford.

== Career in India ==
Burn entered the Indian Civil Service in 1891. He became Under-Secretary to the Government of the United Provinces in 1897, Superintendent of the Census 1900, and of the Imperial Gazetteer in 1902, and editor in 1905.

He was Secretary to the Government of the United Provinces, and member of the Legislative Council, from 1910 (Chief Secretary, 1912). He became a Commissioner in 1918 and member of the Board of Revenue, United Provinces, in 1922. In 1926 he was Acting Finance Member. Burn retired in 1927.

Burn was awarded the Kaiser-i-Hind gold medal for famine services in India in 1907–08, and knighted in 1927.

== The Imperial Gazetteer of India ==
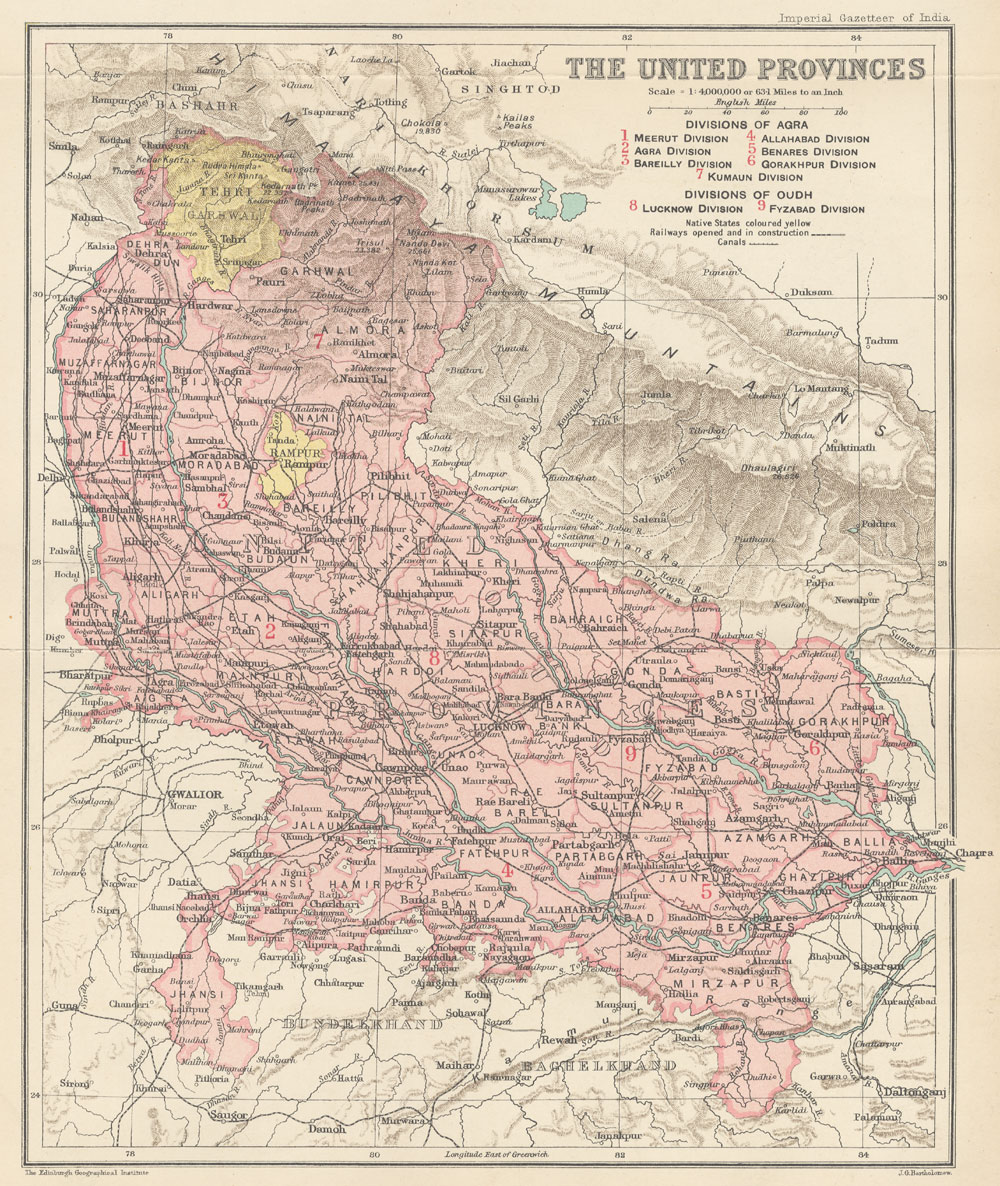
The United Provinces in 1909 in a map from The Imperial Gazetteer of India.

Burn was the third editor in India of the new edition of The Imperial Gazetteer of India, replacing William Stevenson Meyer who had himself replaced Sir Herbert Risley, both of whom had been promoted to more senior positions. The Gazetteer was published in 26 volumes at Oxford from 1909. The first edition had been published in 1881 and the second in 1885–87.

In a paper read before the Indian Section of The Royal Society of Arts in 1908, Burn described the great efforts that had been made to improve on earlier editions of the Gazetteer, including a vastly expanded contents and the inclusion of a detailed atlas. He reported that it had taken years of discussion to settle the form of the work:

It is not my intention to weary you by detailing the numerous proposals and counter-proposals which followed the decision that a new revised gazetteer should be prepared. There is a story relating that a newcomer in the secretariat of the Government of India was appalled by the number of officials whom it was deemed necessary to consult regarding a certain file. In sending it on, he noted (whether ingenuously or with undue levity must not be enquired) that by some mistake the file had not yet been submitted for the opinion of the Bishop of Calcutta, though all other high officials had seen it.

== Numismatics ==
Burn was a knowledgeable numismatist, producing papers on the subject that were published in the Numismatic Chronicle and the journals of the Royal Asiatic Society and the Asiatic Society of Bengal. He was a founder member, in 1910, of the Numismatic Society of India.

== Selected publications ==
- Census report of the United Provinces. 1902.
- The Imperial Gazetteer of India. 3rd edition. Clarendon Press, Oxford, from 1909. (Editor)
- The Cambridge History of India Vol. IV The Mughul period. University Press, Cambridge, 1937. Planned by Wolseley Haig, edited by Richard Burn.
- The Cambridge History of India Vol. VI. The Indian Empire, 1858–1918. With chapters on the development of administration, 1818–1858. 1932. Edited by H.H. Dodwell. Four chapters by Richard Burn.
