= Saeeduzzaman Siddiqui =

Pakistani politician and judge (1937–2017)

The Honourable Justice M. Saiduzzaman Siddiqui
- سعید الزمان صدیقی

31st Governor of Sindh
- In office 11 November 2016 – 11 January 2017
- President: Mamnoon Hussain
- Prime Minister: Nawaz Sharif
- Preceded by: Ishratul Ibad; Agha Siraj Durrani (Acting)
- Succeeded by: Muhammad Zubair Umar

15th Chief Justice of Pakistan
- In office 1 July 1999 – 26 January 2000 (Resigned) (1 December 2003) (Actual)
- Appointed by: Muhammad Rafiq Tarar
- Preceded by: Ajmal Mian
- Succeeded by: Irshad Hasan Khan

7th Chief Justice Sindh High Court
- In office 5 November 1990 – 21 May 1992
- Preceded by: Sajjad Ali Shah
- Succeeded by: Nasir Aslam Zahid

Personal details
- Born: 25 December 1937 Lucknow, United Provinces, British India (now in Uttar Pradesh, India)
- Died: 11 January 2017 (aged 79) Karachi, Sindh, Pakistan
- Spouse: Dr. Ashraf Saiduzzaman Siddiqui
- Children: Muhammad Afnan Saiduzzaman Siddiqui
- Parent(s): Nawabzada Muhammad Naeem Siddiqui: Bibbi Basheer-un-nisa
- Education: College Dacca; University of Calcutta; University of Karachi

Supreme Court of Pakistan

Justice Muhammad Saiduzzaman Siddiqui (Urdu: سعید الزمان صدیقی; 1 December 1939 – 11 January 2017) (pronunciation 'sa'eed -uz- zam'an'; alternatively / officially M. Saiduzzaman Siddiqui) was a Pakistani jurist and legislator of great prominence who formerly served as the 15th Chief Justice of Pakistan and, prior to that, the 7th Chief Justice of the Sindh High Court. At the time of his death, he was serving as the 31st Governor of Sindh.

== Education ==
Saiduzzaman Siddiqui was born into an educated Urdu-speaking business family, with a higher middle-class background and early schooling at Lucknow (in modern Uttar Pradesh) and early secondary education at Calcutta. Justice Siddiqui passed Matriculation from the Board of Secondary Education from Dhaka, East Pakistan in 1952. In 1954, Justice Siddiqui obtained an Engineering Sciences degree from the University of Calcutta. Thereafter, when Mr. Siddiqui's family moved to Karachi, West-Pakistan he attended Karachi University in 1956, where he obtained L.L.B from Sindh Muslim Law College affiliated with the University of Karachi in 1958/59. In 1961, Justice Siddiqui started legal practice at the Sindh High Court.

Justice Siddiqui was awarded honorary membership of the Judicial fraternity of Australia by Honourable David Kingsley Malcolm of Australia after the news of his resignation from the office of the Chief Justice was made public in January 2000, due to his refusal to take the Oath under the PCO (Provisional Constitutional Order), which was an unconstitutional Oath prescribed for the Judges of the superior Courts by the military regime of Pervez Musharraf. Saiduzzaman Siddiqui also received a letter of commendation from the Judiciary of the United Kingdom and was inducted in the roles of Judges of eminence by the British Judiciary for his stand in the cause of the independence of Pakistan's Judiciary, his stand was later glorified by the Lawyers' Movement in Pakistan which helped Chief Justice Iftikhar Chaudhary's restoration.

== Career ==
=== Joining the Bar and Sindh High Court ===
Justice Saiduzzaman joined the Karachi Bar Association in February 1961. He enrolled as an Advocate of High Court of West Pakistan in November 1962, and enrolled as Advocate of Supreme Court of Pakistan in November 1969). He was elected Joint Secretary of Karachi High Court Bar Association in 1967. He was elected Member of the Managing Committee of Karachi High Court Bar Association for the year 1968–69. In 1977, he was elected Honorary Secretary of the High Court Bar Library and continued in that capacity until he was elevated to the rank of Judge of the Sindh High Court on 5 May 1980. He was appointed Chief Justice of the Sindh High Court on 5 November 1990 and as Judge of Supreme Court of Pakistan on 23 May 1992.

=== Chief Justice of Pakistan ===
He was appointed Chief Justice of Pakistan/Chairman Pakistan Law Commission w.e.f. 1 July 1999 till his actual retirement on 1 December 2003. He was the Chief Justice of Pakistan when the 1999 military coup d'état was staged by Chief of Army Staff General Pervez Musharraf. Notably, he defied the request put forth to him by Musharraf via the Law Minister and Legal Adviser Sharifuddin Pirzada to take a new oath under the Provisional Constitutional Order (PCO) saying that: "Taking an oath under the PCO, in my opinion, will be a deviation from the oath I had taken to defend the constitution of 1973". The PCO not only negated the independence of the judiciary and democratic norms, but also prolonged the martial law by nullifying the effect of any judgement given against President Pervez Musharraf's government.

=== Post-retirement ===
As a consequence of this, he was forced to step down from his position by the military regime. His tenure time period was shortened due to his refusal to take the Provisional Constitutional Order (PCO) Oath, prescribed by General Pervez Musharraf to legitimize the Legal Framework Order, 2002. After a long discussion with the four Army generals sent to his residence during the early hours of the morning by General Musharraf; namely, Lieutenant-General (Retired) Moinuddin Haider, who was Interior Minister, then-Lieutenant-General Ehsan ul Haq, Core-commander of the XI Corps, Lieutenant-General (retired) Mahmud Ahmed, then-Director General of the ISI and Brigadier-General (retired) Javed Ashraf Bajwa; Chief Justice Siddiqui refused to take the Oath after which the Generals left. On the orders of GHQ he, along with his family were put into house arrest.

On 25 August 2008, Nawaz Sharif announced that Saiduzzaman Siddiqui would be the Pakistan Muslim League (N) and Jamaat-e-Islami nominee to replace Pervez Musharraf as President of Pakistan. He lost the 6 September 2008 Pakistani presidential election, by 153 votes to Asif Ali Zardari, who was elected President of Pakistan. The PML-N although in power wanted Siddiqui as a unanimous candidate as he was the only nonpartisan candidate contesting this election of 2008. Justice Siddiqui was again selected as a candidate for the 2013 Pakistani presidential election, but at the last moment his name was replaced by Mamnoon Hussain as Siddiqui never joined the PML-N and was a neutral candidate. He was supported by Baloch nationalists.

=== Governor of Sindh ===
On 9 November 2016, Nawaz Sharif contacted Justice Siddiqui and asked him to accept the position of the Governor, in the wake of the events which followed the dismissal of Dr. Ishratul Ibad Khan after a statement was given by Syed Mustafa Kamal. Justice Siddiqui was sworn in as the 31st Governor of Sindh on 11 November 2016. He died in office exactly two months later. He was only the second person to receive a state funeral at the Karachi Governor's House, the first being the father of the nation Muhammad Ali Jinnah

== Appointments ==
- Appointed Member of Election Commission of Pakistan on 9 August 1980.
- Appointed as Chairman Rule Committee of High Court of Sindh on 1 February 1986.
- Appointed Chairman Sindh Zakat Council on 13 September 1988.
- Appointed as Member of Company Law Commission on 7 June 1989.
- Appointed Acting Governor of Sindh from 27 July 1990 to 30 July 1990.
- Appointed Acting Chief Justice of High Court of Sindh from 19 September 1990 to 19 October 1990.
- Appointed as 15th Chief Justice of Pakistan from 1 July 1999 to 25 January 2000 was until December 2005
- Appointed Chairman of Citizens' Group on Electoral Process (CGEP)
- Member OIC contact group, also submitted a report on 'Bulgarian Muslims Social condition'
- Appointed as Governor of Sindh on 9 November 2016

== Activities ==
- Appointed as Member of 3-men Contact Group, by Secretary-General of the Organization of Islamic Conference to investigate the plight of Muslim minority in Bulgaria in May 1986. He presented the first report of the group to the 17th Islamic Conference of Foreign Ministers held at Amman, Jordan, in March 1988, a second report to the 18th Islamic Conference of Foreign Ministers at Riyadh in March 1989, and the third report to the 19th Islamic Conference of Foreign Ministers at Cairo in July 1990.
- Also presented a preliminary report on the plight of Muslim minority in Bulgaria in the Extraordinary Session of Islamic Conference of Foreign Ministers in New York in October 1989. Attended the 17th, 18th, 19th and the Extraordinary Session of Islamic Conferences of Foreign Ministers in Amman, Riyadh, Cairo and New York on special invitation of Secretary-General of Organization of Islamic Conference.
- He was the Chairman of numerous organizations, some of which are The Council for Foreign Relations Economic Affairs and Law and President of the Poor Patient's Society of Pakistan. He was the Chairman of the World Bank supported Organization for Alternative Dispute Resolution (Pakistan).
- He was also the nominee judge for the International Court of Justice (ICJ) at The Hague, from Pakistan.
- On 25 August 2008, Nawaz Sharif announced that Justice Siddiqui would be Pakistan Muslim League (N) and Jamaat-i-Islami's joint candidate to replace Pervez Musharraf as President of Pakistan, he also received popular support from the Baloch Nationalist parties, although he had never joined any political party even after being approached by Pakistan Tehreek-e-Insaf Chairman Imran Khan in 2007 and again in 2010. He chose to remain a nonpartisan individual. His name has been suggested by JUI and Pakistan Tehreek-i-Insaf for the Prime Minister candidate when the interim government comes into power after March 2013.
- On 9 November 2016, Mamnoon Hussain in consultation with Nawaz Sharif appointed him as the Governor of Sindh province.

== Illness and death ==
Siddiqui contracted pneumonia and was hospitalised in early November 2016. He returned to the Governor House on 11 December 2016 and died on 11 January 2017 as a serving governor when he contracted another pneumonia on his healthy right lung. His state funeral was organised in the Governor House, making him the second person in the history of the country to receive a state funeral after Muhammad Ali Jinnah, the founder of Pakistan. He was 80.

In 2018, Siddiqui was posthumously nominated for the Nishan-i-Imtiaz - Pakistan's highest civilian honour - but it could not be awarded, as the family could not be present on the 23rd March and in a few months the government changed and civilian award which was to be given to the family of Justice Siddiqui was held back. Prime minister Imran Khan wanted President Arif Alvi to confer the award afresh, due to which President Arif Alvi asked for resubmission of the citation for the civil award to be conferred posthumously. President Mamnoon Hussain had already nominated Mr. Siddiqui's name for the award on the advice of Mian Muhammad Nawaz Sharif, which was to be received by his wife Dr. Ashraf Saiduzzaman who unfortunately could not be present in Islamabad due to her ailment.

== See also ==
- Supreme Court of Pakistan
- Chief Justices of Pakistan
- Haziqul Khairi
- Siddiqui
- Nawaz Sharif
- Pakistan Muslim League (N)
- Provisional Constitutional Order
- List of Pakistanis

Preceded by Ishratul Ibad	Governor of Sindh; 2016–2017	Succeeded by Muhammad Zubair Umar

Legal offices
Preceded by Ajmal Mian	Chief Justice of Pakistan; 1999–2000	Succeeded by Irshad Hasan Khan
Preceded by Sajjad Ali Shah	Chief Justice of the Sindh High Court; 5 November 1990 – 21 May 1992	Succeeded by Nasir Aslam Zahid
