= 2008 Pakistani presidential election =

Presidential election

Pakistani Presidential Election, 2008
- 6 September 2008

669 votes in the Electoral College 335 votes needed to win
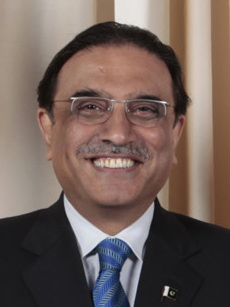

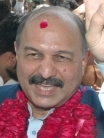
Candidate	Asif Ali Zardari	Saeeduzzaman Siddiqui	Mushahid Hussain
Party	PPP	PML(N)	PML(Q)
Home state	Sindh	Sindh	Punjab
Electoral vote	409	216	44
States carried	3 + ICT	1	0
Percentage	61.14%	32.29%	6.58%
- Map of the results
President before election
Muhammad Mian Soomro (acting)
PML(Q)
Elected President
Asif Ali Zardari
PPP

An indirect presidential election was held on 6 September 2008 in Pakistan. The Electoral College of Pakistan – a joint sitting of the Senate, National Assembly and Provincial Assemblies – elected a new president after the resignation of President Pervez Musharraf. As required by the constitution, Muhammad Mian Soomro (in his position as Chairman of the Senate of Pakistan) automatically became acting president on 18 August 2008, upon the resignation of Musharraf. The constitution required that a new president be elected by Parliament within 30 days; Soomro was considered loyal to Musharraf, and it was considered certain that he would be replaced in that election.

== Composition of the Electoral College ==
The Electoral College of Pakistan is formed by a joint sitting of the six leading political bodies in Pakistan:

- the Senate of Pakistan,
- the National Assembly of Pakistan,
- the Provincial Assembly of the Punjab,
- the Provincial Assembly of Sindh,
- the Provincial Assembly of Balochistan
- the Provincial Assembly of Khyber Pakhtunkhwa

So that each province has an equal vote, all provincial assemblies are given exactly 65 votes in the electoral college. This mean that the each member of the Punjab Assembly has 65/370 = 0.176 votes, each member of the Sindh Assembly has 65/166 = 0.392 votes, each member of the Khyber Pakhtunkhwa Assembly has 65/124 = 0.524 votes and each member of the Balochistan Assembly has 65/65 = 1 vote.

The political composition of these bodies at the time of the election was:

Body	PPP	PMLN	PML(Q)	MQM-L	ANP	JUI(F)	PML-F	QWP	BNP(A)	NPP	Other/Independents	Total
National Assembly	124	91	54	25	13	7	5	1	1	1	18	340
Senate	9	4	38	6	2	17	1	3	1	–	19	100
Punjab Assembly	107	170	84	–	–	2	3	–	–	–	4	370
Sindh Assembly	93	–	9	51	2	–	8	–	–	3	–	166
Balochistan Assembly	12	–	19	–	4	10	–	–	7	–	13	65
Khyber Pakhtunkhwa Assembly	30	9	6	–	48	14	–	6	–	–	11	124
Total (weighted)	216	130	132	51	45	42	10	7	9	2	56	700
Source: Election Commission of Pakistan's tally of seats of the National Assembly, Senate, and Provincial Assemblies. Also given is the counting procedure of Presidential election

== Candidates ==
Nominations closed on Tuesday 26 August.

- On 18 August the ruling PPP co-chairmen, Bilawal Bhutto Zardari and Asif Ali Zardari, said that the next president should come from the PPP as they had the largest number of seats in parliament.
- On 19 August the ruling coalition discussed the presidency and was reported to have considered five candidates:
  - Asif Ali Zardari PPP co-chairman
  - Mahmood Khan Achakzai, leader of the PkMAP
  - Aftab Shaban Mirani, former PPP Chief Minister of Sindh
  - Fehmida Mirza, PPP speaker of the National Assembly of Pakistan from Sindh
  - Faryal Talpur, PPP Nazim (mayor) of a city Sindh and sister of Asif Ali Zardari
- On 20 August the opposition Muttahida Qaumi Movement – which backed Musharraf – said the President should not come from Punjab and backed Pakistan Peoples Party leader Asif Ali Zardari – who is from Sindh – for president.
- On 21 August the PMLN was reported to have suggested three people for the presidency:
  - Fakhruddin G. Ebrahim, a lawyer
  - Ataullah Mengal, a nationalist leader from Balochistan (Pakistan), and
  - Saeeduzzaman Siddiqui, a former Chief Justice of the Supreme Court of Pakistan
- On 22 August, the PPP officially nominated Zardari as its candidate.
- On 23 August, the PMLN said it preferred an independent president. However, PML(N) head Sharif said he would support Zardari if they agreed to reduce the powers of the Presidency and reinstate the judges sacked after the 2007 Pakistani state of emergency
- On 24 August the ANP said it would support Zardari.
- On 25 August:
  - The PMLN pulled out of the coalition government and said it would support Saeeduzzaman Siddiqui for the presidency, and emphasised that the Presidency should remain a neutral office as it represents the Federating Units, Justice Siddiqui was not part of the PML(N) or any other political party.
  - Imran Khan, the former cricket and leader of the PTI party said Zardari should not become president as he was "such a corrupt man".
  - The JUI (F)-Fazl party said it would support Zardari if the government agreed to end the military operation in Bajaur.
  - The PML(F) said it would neither support nor oppose Zardari.
  - The All Pakistan Minorities Alliance said it supported Zardari.
- On 26 August the PML(Q) nominated Senator Mushahid Hussain as its candidate.
- On 28 August the Election Commission of Pakistan announced that five people had been validly nominated as candidates:
  - Asif Ali Zardari, PPP
  - Saeeduzzaman Siddiqui, supported by the PMLN and JI;
  - Mushahid Hussain, PML(Q)
  - Faryal Talpur, covering candidate for Zardari
  - Roedad Khan, covering candidate for Justice Siddiqui
- On 30 August, Talpur and Roedad withdrew their candidacies.
- On 31 August the QWP declared its support for Zardari.

== Result ==
Summary of the 6 September 2008 Pakistani presidential election results
Candidate	Main supporting party	Senate	National Assembly	Punjab*	Sindh*	Balochistan	NWFP*	Total
Asif Ali Zardari	Pakistan Peoples Party	241		20	63	40	45	409
Saeeduzzaman Siddiqui	Pakistan Muslim League (N) & Jamaat-e-Islami Pakistan;	142		40	0	9	25	216
Mushahid Hussain Syed	Pakistan Muslim League (Q)	31		3	0	7	2	44
* Pro-rated to 65 votes
Source: Dawn

Asif Ali Zardari was elected President of Pakistan, as Chief election commissioner Qazi Mohammad Farooq announced that "Asif Ali Zardari secured 241 votes out of the 426 valid votes polled in the parliament," In Sindh, Zardari had 62 of the 65 electoral votes while his 2 main opponents, got zero vote; in Khyber Pakhtunkhwa Zardari got 56 votes against 25 by Siddiqui and one by Hussain; in Baluchistan, 49 votes while Siddiqui and Hussain got 5 and 2 respectively. BBC reported that Zardari "won 419 votes, far more than the 372 votes that would have guaranteed him victory." The New York Times said that Zardari would be sworn in "as soon as Saturday night or as late as Monday or Tuesday, diplomats and officials said."

The new president, who obtains the largest number of votes, will serve for 5 years as Pakistan's 11th since 1956, when the country became a republic, excluding acting presidents. Voting was in progress at the Parliament House, while the Senate members finished casting their votes, amid the death of 12 people, after a suicide car bomber blasted a security checkpoint on the outskirts of Peshawar.

=== Violation of rules in Khyber Pakhtunkhwa ===
A number of MPAs of Khyber Pakhtunkhwa Assembly including the Chief Minister violated the secret ballot by displaying the stamped ballot papers in the presidential elections. So these votes have to be subtracted from the vote count.

== Reaction ==
Pakistan Peoples Party activists in Pakistan held rallies and distributed sweets when the results were announced. The main opposition party, PML-N, said it was the "success of the democratic process in the country" but said he should resign as PPP co-chairman, as the President has traditionally been apolitical, and to transfer Presidential powers back to parliament. The newspaper 'Dawn' described Zardari as the most controversial President of Pakistan at the time of his election, and urged him to "dispel the impression of a political wheeler-dealer and rise to the requirements of statesmanship". The Regional Times of Sindh said Zardari had one of the stiffest jobs in the world as leader of the world's only nuclear-armed Islamic country, a frontline war on terror state and facing "growing militancy" and "crippling economic woes". However, they said his "years of suffering have made him wiser and headstrong" and he has "displayed great acumen and maturity since returning to the political scene". Privately, the Pakistan military, bureaucracy and business elite were said to be "aghast" at the result given past corruption allegations.

The United States Secretary of State welcomed Zardari's victory, praising his "emphasis on fighting terrorism" and "very strong words of friendship and alliance with the United States".

== See also ==
- Elections in Pakistan
- President of Pakistan
- Pakistan
