= Effort to impeach Pervez Musharraf =

2008 Pakistani presidential impeachment attempt

In August 2008, opposition parties comprising the Pakistan Peoples Party (PPP), Pakistan Muslim League (N) (PML-N), Awami National Party (ANP), and Jamiat Ulema-e-Islam attempted to have President Pervez Musharraf of Pakistan impeached. On August 18, Musharraf announced his resignation.

== Background ==
On November 3, 2007, President and then-Chief of the Army Staff Pervez Musharraf declared a state of emergency, postponing indefinitely the elections for the National Assembly of Pakistan that were initially scheduled to take place on January 8, 2008. The emergency announcement also contained news of the dismissal of Chief Justice of Pakistan Iftikhar Muhammad Chaudhry, widely considered to have been motivated by a prediction that the Supreme Court was about to invalidate Musharraf's October reelection as President of Pakistan in uniform. This action, combined with a broad-based pro-democracy movement occurring in Pakistan at the time, led to a precipitous fall in Musharraf's popularity. Following the assassination of Benazir Bhutto, the Pakistani Election Commission announced that the election would occur on February 18. The elections were won by the PPP and the PML-N, two parties hostile to Musharraf and his Pakistan Muslim League (Q) party.

== Details ==
On August 7, 2008, the Pakistan Peoples Party and the Pakistan Muslim League (N) agreed to ask Musharraf to get the Vote of Confidence from the National and Provisional Assemblies or step down, and began his impeachment. Asif Ali Zardari and Nawaz Sharif announced that the two parties would be sending a joint request asking that Musharraf step down, and that they would impeach him through the parliamentary process if he refused. Musharraf, however, said, "I will defeat those who try to push me to the wall. If they use their right to oust me, I have the right to defend myself." Upon hearing the news, Musharraf delayed his departure for the Beijing Olympics by a day, and it was later announced that he would be replaced at the opening ceremonies by Prime Minister Yousaf Raza Gilani. The government summoned the National Assembly for a session on August 11 to begin the impeachment proceedings. Capt. Wasif Syed, spokesman for the Pakistan People's Party, confirmed the announcement, saying, "A decision has been made that he has to go now, and all the parties have agreed on this point." To impeach Musharraf, the ruling coalition would have needed a two-thirds majority in the National Assembly, and it was not certain that they control the required number of votes. Musharraf had the option to fight his impeachment by dissolving parliament, although doing so could cause a backlash, and he would likely need the support of Pakistan's army to be successful.

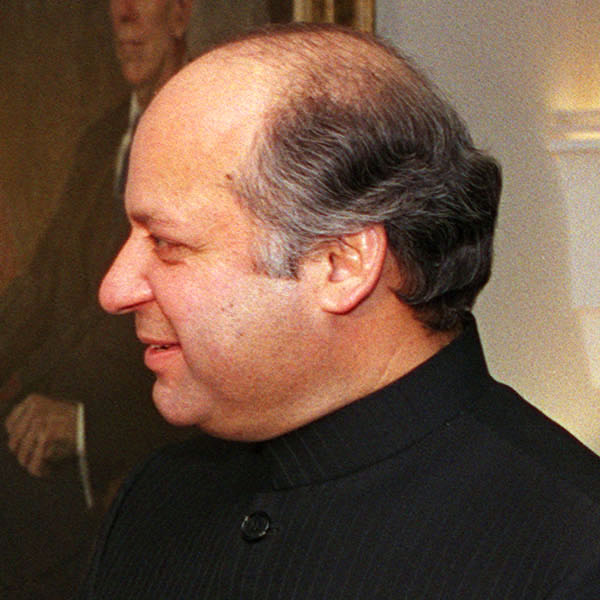
Nawaz Sharif

Zardari announced on TV that the impeachment would be under Article 47 of the Pakistani Constitution. This provides the process for impeachment, but he did not mention the grounds. The 2007 impeachment proceedings, which led to the imposition of emergency rule, were based upon the provisions prohibiting the President of Pakistan from holding "an office of profit" from the Pakistan Government.

Pakistan's ruling coalition, on August 16, gave Musharraf a Tuesday, August 19 deadline to resign. Foreign Minister Shah Mehmood Qureshi said Musharraf must resign to avoid being impeached "by today or tomorrow, as there is no room for any delay". Defense Minister Ahmed Mukhtar announced that "the charge sheet will be presented in parliament by Tuesday." No president has ever been impeached in Pakistan's 61-year history. Presidential aides, however, said Musharraf refused to leave office under pressure. Meanwhile, Pakistan Peoples Party co-chairman Asif Zardari said that the next president of the country may very well be a woman, denying he was a presidential candidate: "I would have become the prime minister if I wished to become president." Nawaz Sharif said: "I am not personally interested. It should go to a person who actually enjoys the support of the people of Pakistan. I think best would be somebody from Balochistan of course there is a sense of deprivation in the province of Balochistan, perhaps that will be a better choice."

=== Resignation ===
On August 18, 2008, in a speech defending his record, Musharraf announced that he would resign. In the August 18 negotiations which failed over the legal technicalities, he sought immunity from prosecution if he had resigned before the impeachment proceedings. On asylum, Condoleezza Rice on "Fox News Sunday" said that "Musharraf would not be going to the United States. This is an issue that is not on the table." Musharraf stated he would stay in Pakistan in a house he was building in an exclusive enclave in Islamabad near a golf club.

Musharraf, 65, announced his resignation, in a 1 p.m. televised address to avoid impeachment: "After viewing the situation and consulting legal advisers and political allies, with their advice I have decided to resign. I leave my future in the hands of people. Not a single charge in the impeachment can stand against me. No charge can be proved against me because I never did anything for myself, it was all for Pakistan. On the map of the world, Pakistan is now an important country, by the grace of Allah. Whether I win or lose the impeachment, the nation will lose. They don’t realize they can succeed against me but the country will undergo irreparable damage. My resignation will go to the speaker of the National Assembly today." In an emotional 1 hour speech, Musharraf raised his clenched fists to chest height, and said, "Long live Pakistan!" Nasir Ali Khan, a senior member of the Pakistan Muslim League-N, said Musharraf will stay in Pakistan, a request he had insisted on. The Constitution provided that a new president must be chosen within 30 days. The resignation permitted the 4-month-old coalition government to choose a new president by a vote of the Parliament and provincial assemblies. US-based Newsweek magazine reported that "the president would 'fly into exile in Saudi Arabia, where he is to remain for the next three months." The British Daily Telegraph reported an unnamed Western diplomat as saying that, after a pilgrimage to Mecca, Musharraf might settle in London.

=== Presidential election ===
Pakistan's Election Commission on August 22 announced that Presidential elections were to be held on September 6, and the nomination papers could be filed from August 26. President Asif Ali Zardari was elected by the 2 houses of parliament and the 4 provincial assemblies on September 9.

=== Exile ===
President Pervez Musharraf went into exile on 23 August, 2008. He arrived in London on 24 August, 2008.

== American reaction ==
United States Department of State spokesman Gonzalo Gallegos said, "We have consistently said the internal politics of Pakistan is an issue for the Pakistani people to decide," adding, "Our expectation is that any action will be consistent with the rule of law and the Pakistani constitution."
