= 1878 Birthday Honours =

Appointments by Queen Victoria

The 1878 Birthday Honours were appointments by Queen Victoria to various orders and honours to reward and highlight good works by citizens of the British Empire. The appointments were made to celebrate the official birthday of the Queen, and were published in The London Gazette in May 1878.

The recipients of honours are displayed here as they were styled before their new honour, and arranged by honour, with classes (Knight, Knight Grand Cross, etc.) and then divisions (Military, Civil, etc.) as appropriate.

== United Kingdom and British Empire ==
=== Viscount and Earl ===
- The Right Honourable Thomas George, Lord Northbrook GCB GCSI lately Her Majesty's Viceroy and Governor-General of India, by the names, styles, and titles of Viscount Baring, of Lee, in the county of Kent, and Earl of Northbrook, in the county of Southampton

=== Baronetcies ===
- The Right Honourable Sir Henry Bartle Edward Frere GCB GCSI of Wimbledon, in the County of Surrey

=== Knight Bachelor ===
- Thomas Elder, Member of the Legislative Council of the Colony of South Australia
- Salvatore Naudi, Doctor of Laws, Judge of the Court of Appeal of the Island of Malta
- Edward Eyre Williams, late Puisne Judge of the Supreme Court of the Colony of Victoria

=== The Most Honourable Order of the Bath ===
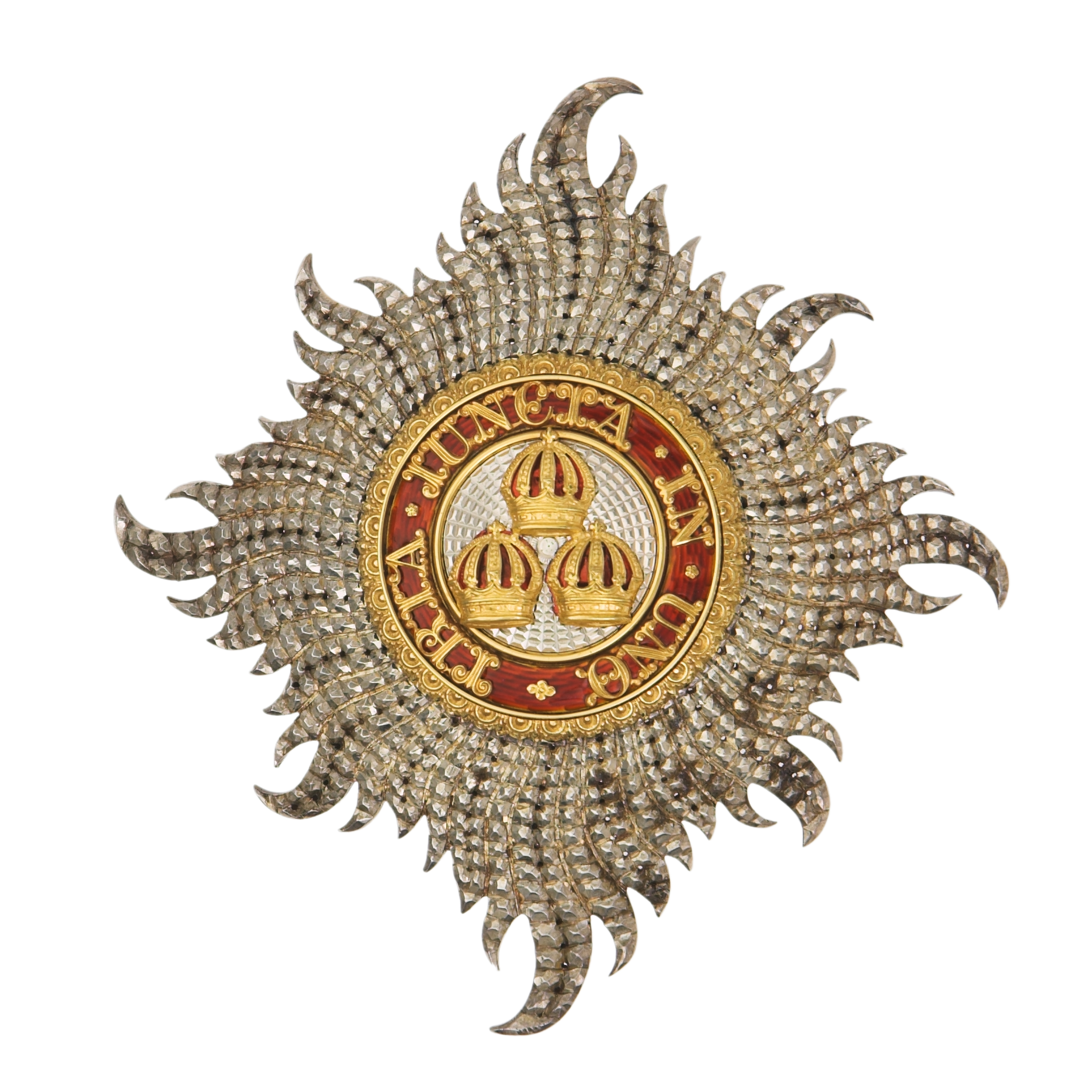
Civilian star of the Knight Grand Cross of the Order of the Bath

==== Knight Grand Cross of the Order of the Bath (GCB) ====
===== Civil Division =====
- Sir Henry Bartle Edward Frere GCSI KCB

==== Knight Commander of the Order of the Bath (KCB) ====
===== Civil Division =====
- Charles, Lord Suffield, of the Household of His Royal Highness the Prince of Wales

=== The Most Exalted Order of the Star of India ===
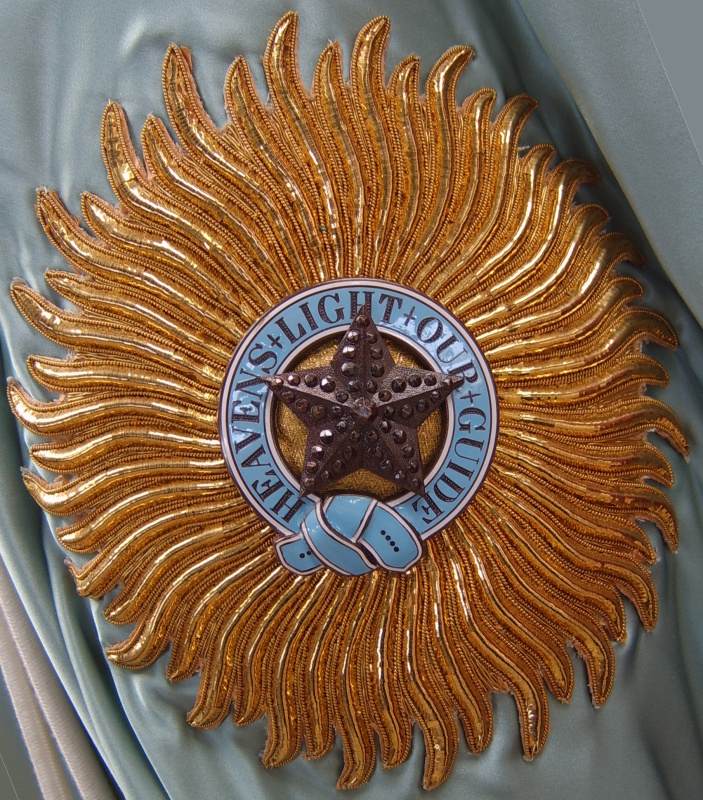
Star of a Knight Grand Commander of the Most Exalted Order of the Star of India

==== Knight Commander (KCSI) ====
- The Honourable Ashley Eden CSI Lieutenant-Governor of Bengal
- Stuart Colvin Bayley CSI Bengal Civil Service, Secretary to the Government of Bengal in the Judicial and Political Departments

==== Companion (CSI) ====
- James Gibbs, Bombay Civil Service, Member of the Council of the Governor of Bombay
- Colonel Charles James Merriman, Royal (late Bombay) Engineers, Superintending Engineer for Irrigation in Sind
- James Bellett Richey, Bombay Civil Service, Extra First Assistant to the Collector and Magistrate of Kaira for the Panch Mahals
- Lieutenant-Colonel William Scott Drever, Madras Staff Corps, Commissioner, Madras Town Police
- John Henry Garstin, Madras Civil Service, Collector and Magistrate, South Arcot
- Robert Davidson, Madras Civil Service, District and Sessions Judge, Chingleput
- Charles Alfred Elliott, Bengal Civil Service, Commissioner of Revenue and Circuit, North-Western Provinces
- Major Colin Campbell Scott Moncrieff, Royal (late Bengal) Engineers, Chief Engineer, Mysore and Coorg

=== The Most Distinguished Order of Saint Michael and Saint George ===
Star of the Order of Saint Michael and Saint George

==== Knight Grand Cross of the Order of St Michael and St George (GCMG) ====
- Major-General Sir William Francis Drummond Jervois KCMG CB Royal Engineers, Governor of the Colony of South Australia
- Sir Alexander Tilloch Galt KCMG Member of the Halifax Fisheries Commission

==== Knight Commander of the Order of St Michael and St George (KCMG) ====
- Albert Smith, Minister of the Marine for the Dominion of Canada, and lately employed in connection with the Halifax Fisheries Commission
- Henry Turner Irving CMG Governor of the Island of Trinidad
- Sanford Freeling CMG Governor of the Gold Coast Colony
- Sir James Milne Wilson Kt lately Premier of the Colony of Tasmania, and now President of the Legislative Council of that Colony
- John Hay, President of the Legislative Council of the Colony of New South Wales
- Archibald Michie QC formerly Attorney-General and Minister of Justice in the Colony of Victoria, and now Agent-General in England for that Colony
- Frederick B. T. Carter, late Premier and Attorney-General of the Island of Newfoundland

==== Companion of the Order of St Michael and St George (CMG) ====
- Anthony O'Grady Lefroy, Treasurer of the Colony of Western Australia
- Doctor Francis Reid, Chief Medical Officer of the Island of Mauritius
- George Henry Kendrick Thwaites, Director of the Botanical Gardens in the Island of Ceylon
- Colonel William Acland Douglas Anderson, in Command of the Local Military Forces in the Colony of Victoria
- Henry Halloran, Principal Under-Secretary for the Colony of New South Wales
- Timothy Darling, Senior Unofficial Member of the Executive Council of the Bahama Islands
- Colville Arthur Durell Barclay, formerly of Mauritius, and lately Auditor-General of the Island of Ceylon
- Colonel George Pomeroy Colley CB for services in Natal and South Africa
- Captain Francis W. Sullivan CB RN Commodore on the Cape and African Station
- Captain Warren, Royal Engineers, Boundary Commissioner, Griqualand West
- Captain Matthew J. Blyth, Resident Magistrate, Griqualand East
- Captain Charles Mills, Assistant Colonial Secretary, Cape of Good Hope
