= John Mather (artist) =

Scottish-Australian plein-air painter and etcher

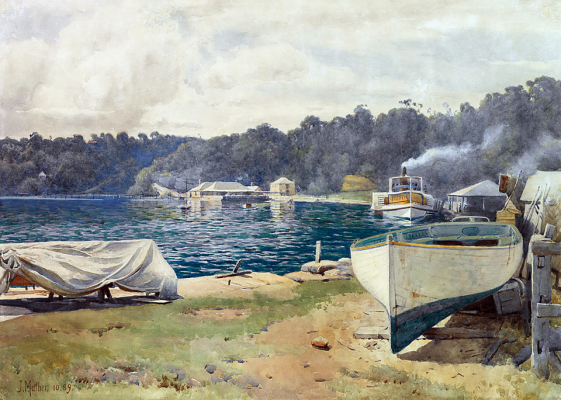
Mosman's Bay, 1889, by Mather, showing the ferry from the city to the artists' camps

John Mather (1848 – 18 February 1916) was a Scottish-Australian plein-air painter and etcher.

Mather was a Scottish artist who emigrated to Melbourne in 1878. He quickly established himself and became an Associate of the Victorian Academy of Arts, exhibiting his work with the academy and subsequent art associations and societies for many years. Mather exhibited his works in Victoria as well other Australian states and internationally.

Mather was one of the early practitioners of painting en plein air in Victoria and his work predates that of other better-known plein air artists. Mather practised the Scottish plein-air tradition and the close study of nature. After emigrating to Melbourne, he sought to analyse and faithfully represent the light and colour of the Australian landscape. Modifying earlier European tones, his paintings came closer to visual truth than any Australian landscapes produced before the later widespread adoption of plein-air methods. Through his desire to realistically reproduce picturesque scenes, he developed a distinctive and independent artistic style.

Together with other artists, in 1886 he established the Australian Artists Association, which was described as "a distinctively Australian school of landscape painters ... who look at colonial scenery with their own eyes, and not through European spectacles."

Mather worked towards bringing the Academy and Association together to form the Victorian Artists Society in 1888 and served as its president for many years. In 1892 he was appointed to the Board of Trustees of the Public Library, Museums and National Gallery of Victoria. John Mather was a member of the Felton Bequest Committee from 1905 to 1916 and as trustee, strongly supported Australian art.

Mather was a landscape painter of considerable reputation during his lifetime, and was a celebrated teacher. However a little more than decade after his death he was almost forgotten. Mather died on 18 February 1916 and lay in a grave with no memorial until 2023 when a plaque was added to his grave simply stating: Mr John Mather 1848 – 1916 The beauty of his Art endures. The words, his Art endures, refers to his painting and etching but also the art he nurtured as a mentor, teacher and one of the founding fathers of art in Victoria.

== Early life, art education and exhibited works ==
John Mather was born in Hamilton, South Lanarkshire, Scotland, son of John Mather, a surveyor, and his wife Margaret, née Allan.

Mather spent his youth sketching and painting. He had access to the art collection of the Duke of Hamilton and was familiar with all the works. When about 15 years old he had his first art lessons with Thomas Fairbairn (1820-1884)

Mather studied at the Royal Glasgow Institute of the Fine Arts. He first exhibited there in 1871 with a water colour of old Highland cottages titled A Bit near Calgary Castle - Isle of Mull. (Note: The Royal Glasgow Institute of the Fine Arts, 1861-1989 : A Dictionary of Exhibitors at the Annual Exhibitions of the Royal Glasgow Institute of the Fine Arts notes "Mather, John, 1848-, Painter, 23 Holmes Street, Hamilton, Lanarkshire" as exhibiting two watercolours, catalogue No.547 A Bit near Calgary Castle - Isle of Mull £5 in 1871 and when at 21 Portland Pl, Hamilton Lanarkshire exhibiting catalogue No.500 Burn Sketches £2 in 1876.) From Glasgow, Mather went to Edinburgh, where he studied at the school of the National Gallery and "painted 'bits' of the old part of the city, which sold rapidly." There he exhibited works as painter in annual exhibitions of the Royal Scottish Academy in 1873. (Note: The Royal Scottish Academy Exhibitors 1826-1990, A Dictionary of Artists and their Work in the Annual Exhibitions of The Royal Scottish Academy 1991 notes "Mather, John, 1848-, Ptr, 35 Orchard St, Hamilton" as exhibiting catalogue No.1130 Arthur's Seat etc from Queen's Park in 1873 and when at 21 Portland Pl, Hamilton exhibiting catalogue No.829 Waterfall, Covan Burn, Hamilton in 1877. John Mather's discipline is noted as a painter. The disciplines noted for other artists include miniaturist, engraver (which includes etchers, lithographers, etc.) sculptor or architect.)

In 1873 – 74, Mather went to Paris and remarked: "I saw the miles of pictures that are to be seen in Paris, and studied them as well as I could." After Paris he went to London, worked and painted as he had done in Edinburgh.

Subsequently, he went back to Scotland and continued at his art. There, whilst residing in Glasgow, he again exhibited at the Royal Glasgow Institute of the Fine Arts in 1876 and at the Royal Scottish Academy Edinburgh in 1877.

Mather's early exhibited works in Glasgow and Edinburgh include:

- A Bit near Calgary Castle - Isle of Mull, watercolour, (exhibited 1871)
- Arthur's Seat from Queens Park (exhibited 1873)
- Burn Sketches (exhibited 1876), watercolour,
- Waterfall, Covan Burn, Hamilton (exhibited 1877)

== The influence of the Cadzow Forest circle of artists ==
John Mather's first painting was a scene in Cadzow Forest. His other known works of the Cadzow Forest, all predating his arrival in Melbourne, include:

- Cadzow Forest (circa 1871-76) Water colour
- Cadzow Forest and white cattle (Title unknown) 1876 Water colour
- Cadzow Forest and white cattle (Title unknown) 1877 Oil

Cadzow Forest is an ancient woodland about 2 kilometres south-east of Hamilton. Famous for its centuries-old oaks and herd of white cattle. In the mid-19th century, the Cadzow Forest became a major destination for Scottish landscape painters, comparable to the Forest of Fontainebleau for the painters of the Barbizon School.

Thomas Fairbairn, Mather's first teacher, was an art teacher and prominent water colourist who moved to Hamilton in 1853, possibly to be near the oak tree forest of Cadzow. (Note: Census transcripts of 1841 to 1851 confirm that Thomas Fairbairn, resided in Glasgow in 1851. He is noted as Teacher of Drawing Portrait and Landscape Painter. In 1855 Thomas Fairbairn, Portrait and landscape painter is recorded as residing at 6 Bothwell Road, Hamilaton The 1878-79 Hamilton directory records Thomas Fairbairn, artist as residing at 10 Union Street Census transcripts of 1861 to 1881 also confirm that Thomas Fairbairn continued to reside in Hamilton. He is noted as Landscape & Portrait Painter and Teacher of Drawing. Fairbairn's relocation from Glasgow to Hamilton may have been because of its proximity to the old oak tree forest of Cadzow. Noting the location as an ideal environment for a painter of woodland scenery and frequented by many Scottish landscape-painters. Also that few water-colour painters of his time excelled Fairbairn in his delineation of forest scenery.) Fairbairn was celebrated as a literal reproducer of nature. He meticulously captured the textures of the ancient oaks, mosses, and woodland streams without romanticising or altering them. Fairbairn was widely regarded as a watercolourist, bringing a soft, precise touch to paintings of the forest landscape.

Other artists that painted in the Cadzow Forest included:

- Samuel Bough (1822–1878),
- Alexander Fraser the Younger (1827–1899), and
- Horatio McCulloch (1805–1867).

In 1913 Mather remarked that he had recently built a studio named Cadzow in memory of the forest and his first painting.

== Arrival and establishment in Melbourne ==
Emigrating to Melbourne in January 1878, John Mather listed his occupation as Painter using the nomenclature of the Royal Glasgow Institute and the Royal Scottish Academy at that time. Less than 12 months later, on 3 December 1878, John Mather was elected as an Associate of the Victorian Academy of Arts.

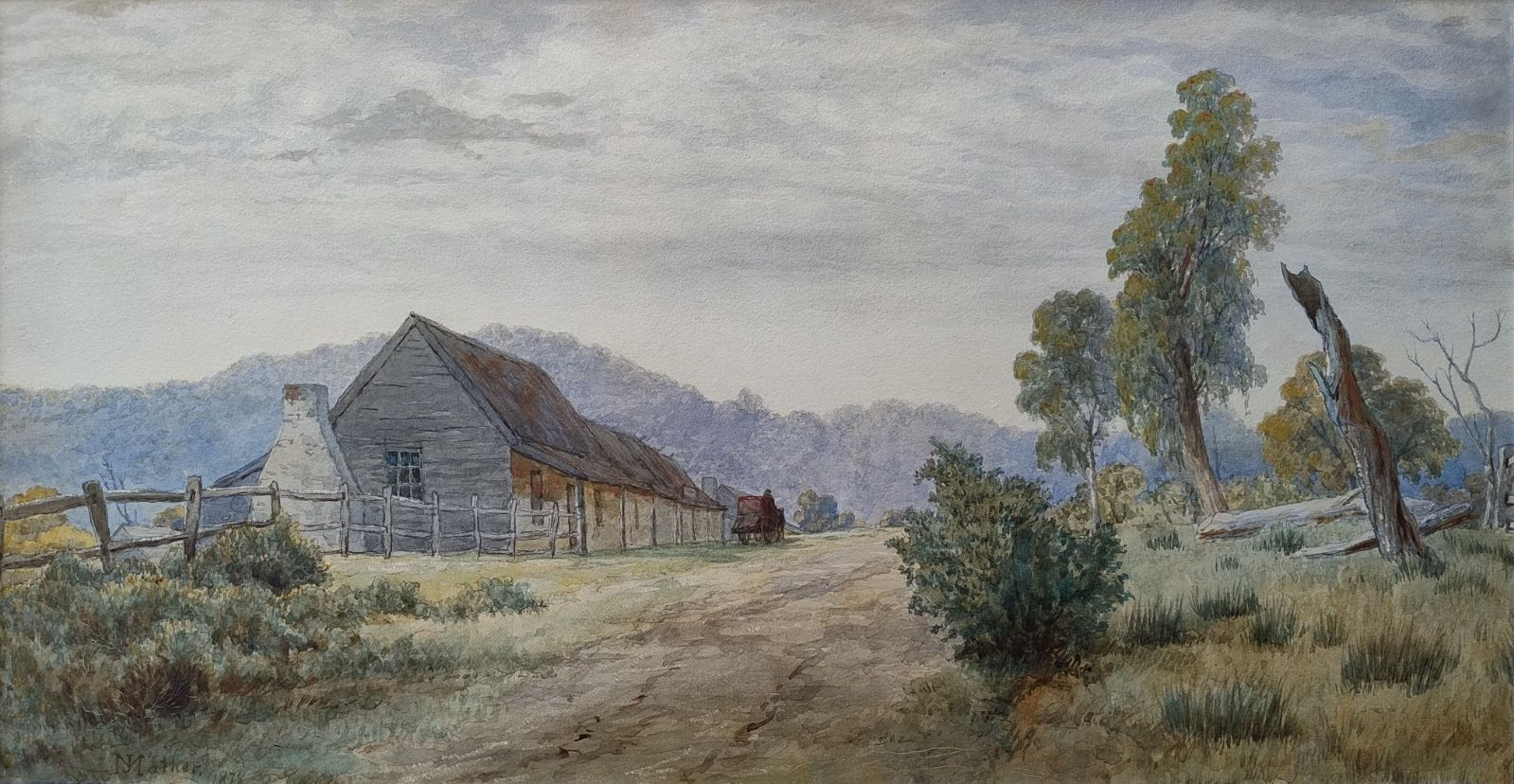
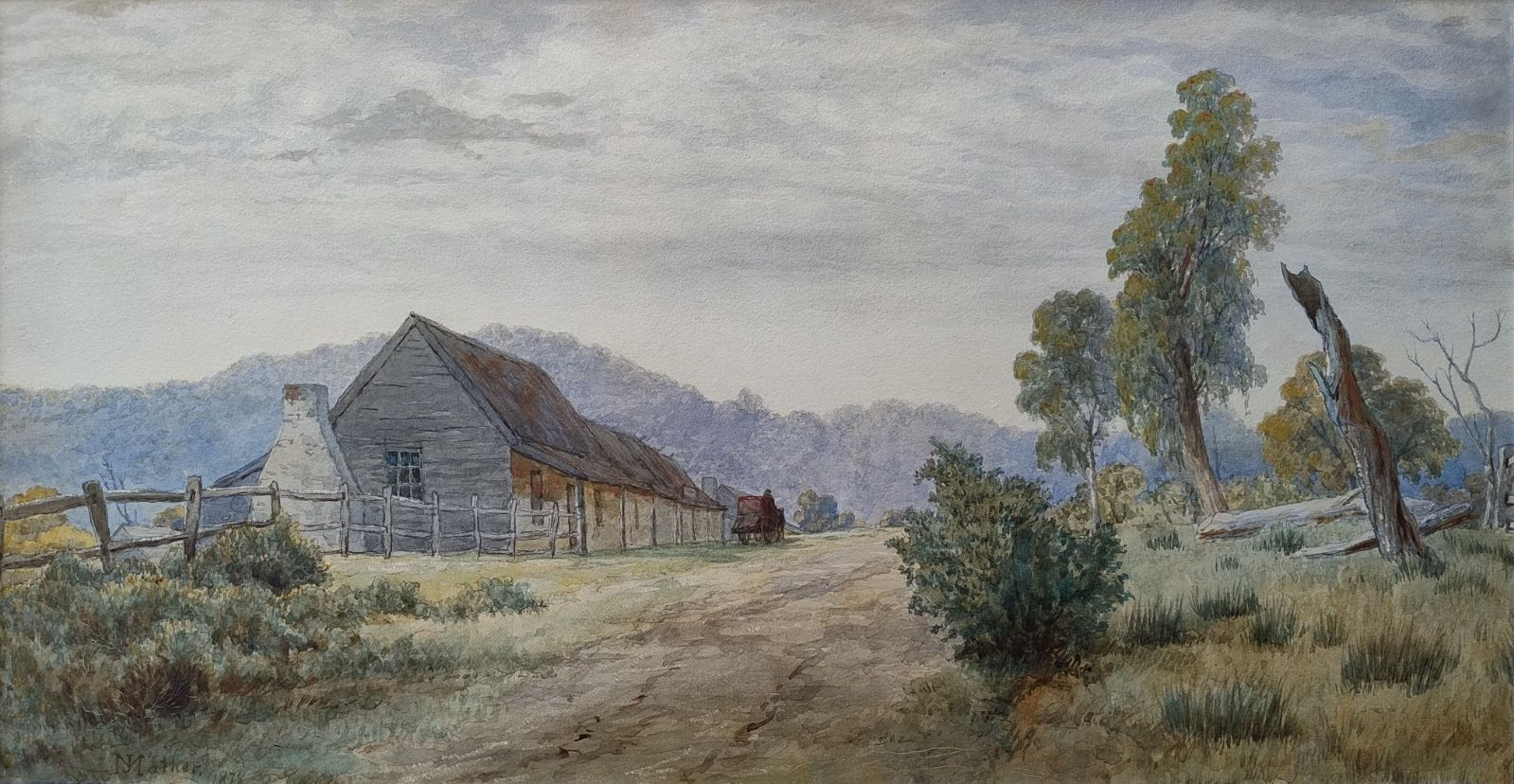
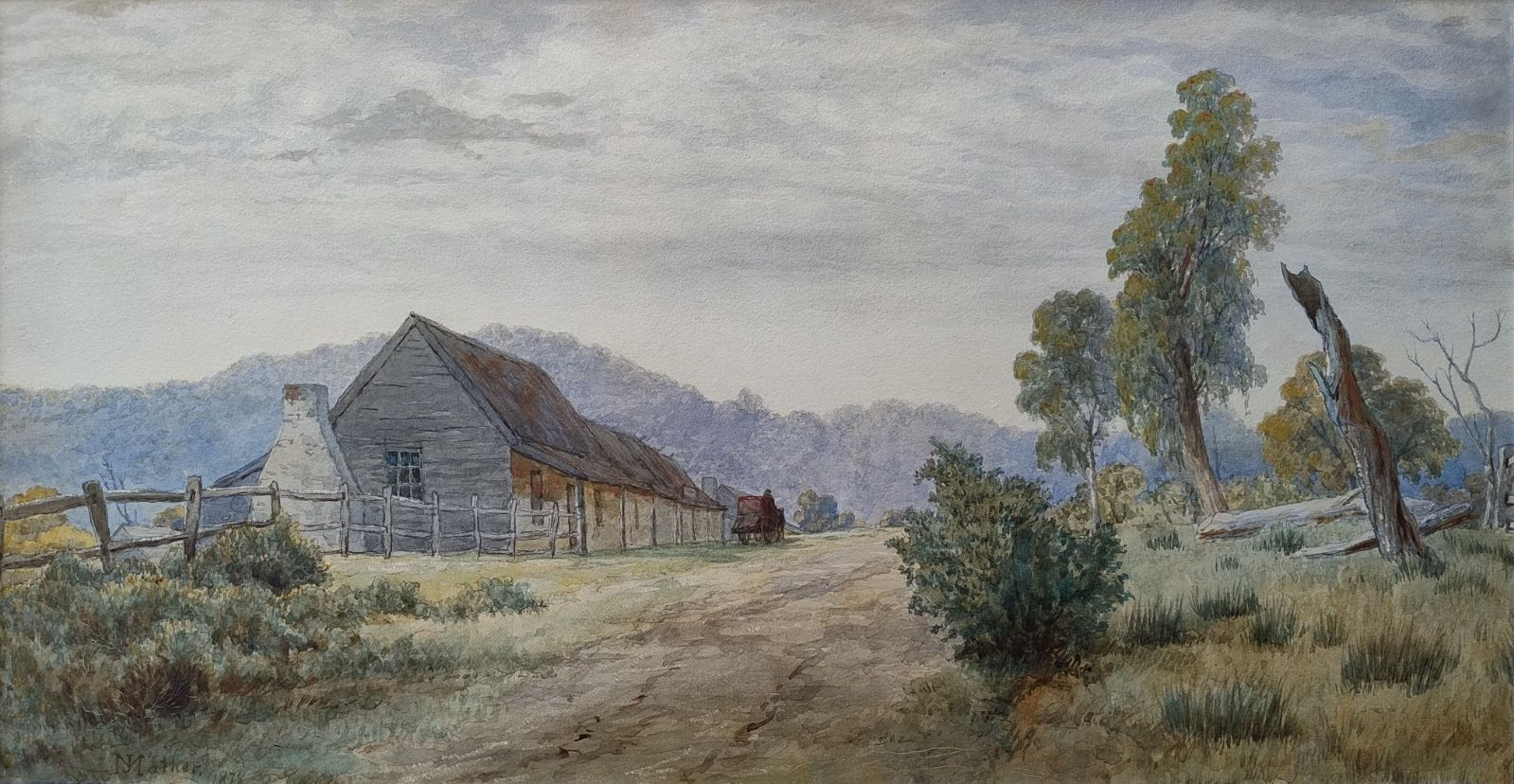
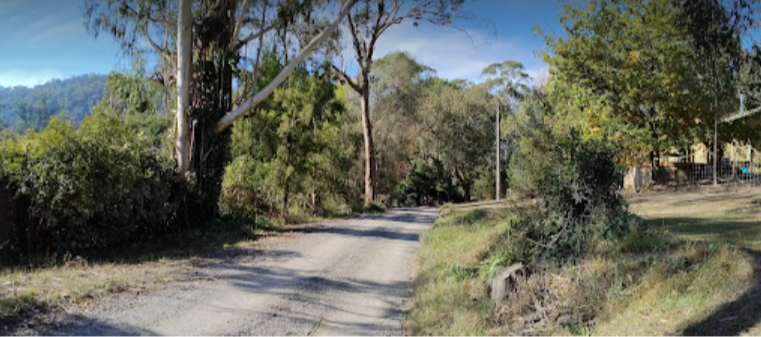
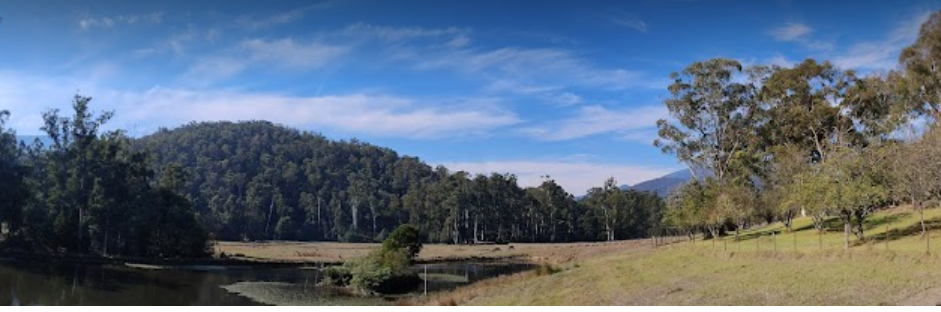
John Mather's 1878 watercolour of Cameron's Glenwatts Store on the Yarra Track (Note: John Mather 1878 Pioneer's Cottages John Mather painted Pioneer’s Cottages in 1878, the year he arrived in Melbourne. The watercolour bears his early monogrammed signature, also seen on another 1878 work held by the National Gallery of Victoria, a practice he did not continue in later works. Pioneer’s Cottages may not be the original title of the painting. While the term pioneer was in use in 1878, it was not typical of Mather’s naming practice and may have been applied later. Nevertheless, the title is appropriate, reflecting his use of generic nouns when depicting buildings within a landscape. Also, the word pioneer carries clear associations with early gold rush settlement, indicating the cottages predate the painting and linking the subject to the formative years of Victoria. Old homes, cottages, and buildings were among Mather’s favourite subjects. He referred to these places as “bits”—buildings to which people felt a strong sense of attachment or belonging. His earliest exhibited work, A Bit near Calgary Castle – Isle of Mull (1871), depicted Highland cottages. In Edinburgh, he painted “bits” of the old city, which sold rapidly. Later, he commented: "I always had a liking for painting ancient buildings, and while in Edinburgh I did a great deal of the old city, and the pictures went like hot cakes. I have been doing something in the same line in Melbourne and Perth, and the work reminded me of bygone times. It is seldom that one can get old buildings out here, though. I suppose (with a smile) the bush hut is about the most interesting". Mather’s travels are evident from his exhibited works. In 1879 he exhibited Yarra Flats and Lagoon, Yarra Flats (now Yarra Glen), and in 1880 On the Stevenson’s River, Marysville. These works indicate visits to the Upper Yarra in the late 1870s and early 1880s. Newspaper reports confirm later trips to the area, and throughout his career he continued to depict older huts, cottages, and farmhouses in the Healesville area. At this time, the interest in bush tracks, scenery and early structures featured prominently in contemporary photography, art, and literature, as seen in the work of John Henry Harvey, Fred Kruger, Nicholas Caire, and John William Lindt. Notably, their images of tracks, coaches, weathered buildings, and fencing closely correspond with those depicted in Mather’s painting. They confirm that these landscape elements existed in the Healesville area and that the watercolour represents them accurately. The painting depicts the location as a stopping place for coaches. This is consistent with later accounts of mail contractors carrying meat, groceries, newspapers, and other supplies to places along the Yarra Track. Subdivision plans surveyed in 1865 and contemporary directories detail many buildings in Healesville’s main street, but only two sites with buildings beyond the town: the Glenwatts Store and a second group about two miles from Healesville, briefly known as Cameron’s Tri Bhean Hotel. No other buildings appear until the settlements of Maytown and Fernshaw, about six miles from Healesville. By 1866, buildings at nearby New Chum were already being dismantled and relocated. Apart from the Glenwatts Store and the former Cameron’s Tri Bhean Hotel, no early gold rush buildings are recorded near Healesville. Of these two locations, the 1878 painting most closely matches the landscape looking east along McGregor Avenue East toward the Glenwatts Store site. The slope of the land, the gentle rise of the road, and the distant hills correspond with the painting. John Mather's 1878 watercolour of Cameron's Glenwatts Store on the Yarra Track Looking east along Mc Gregor Avenue East, Healesville towards former site of Glenwatts Store May 2025 The landscape east of the former site of Glenwatts Store beyond the trees obscuring views in May 2025 These features indicate McGregor Avenue East as the likely location of Mather’s Pioneer’s Cottages. The 1876 – 77, Probate of Ewen Cameron’s will describes a two acre property with a dilapidated seven room weatherboard dwelling and outbuildings, valued at £60. Mather’s painting similarly depicts a group of rustic, ageing buildings. Together, the subdivision plans, directories, landscape assessment, probate of the will, and the painting present a consistent picture of an older dwelling or store on the site in the late 1870s. By 1878, the Glenwatts Store was among the oldest surviving buildings near Healesville, established by an early pioneer on the Yarra Track. Pioneer’s Cottages likely depicts the Glenwatts Store, established by Ewen Cameron in the early 1860s at the junction of Cameron’s Track and an early route of the Yarra Track. The store was located on the north-west corner of McGregor Avenue East and Maroondah Parade, about 2.5 kilometres from central Healesville. The cottages are evocative of the rustic lodgings Mather sometimes experienced: "… he occasionally found his lodgings as primitive as could well be imagined. More than once he had to hastily remove his sketches and himself into the open air, on account of some individuals having a tendency to set the place on fire, after indulging in a rather injudicious testing of the liquor in the hotel bar." As a surviving rustic building from the early Yarra Track, the Glenwatts Store held strong historical and visual appeal within a picturesque bush landscape. In 1878, the track remained in use and was still recalled eighty years later. Together, the site’s appearance, age, setting, and associations with the early gold rush made it a subject of clear artistic interest for Mather. The painting is significant as: • An early watercolour, likely painted en plein air. • A historical record of the Yarra Track and one of its earliest stores, rendered in colour. • One of only two known works by Mather from his first year in Australia. • One of the few works bearing his monogram-style signature.)

In April 1879 he exhibited 11 works at the Annual Exhibition of the Victorian Academy of Arts and was noted as a large exhibitor. He exhibited two oils, Yarra Flats and Evening on the Yarra, and nine watercolours, A Woodland Path Scotland; Sketch near Essendon; Spring-time Scotland; Sketch on Brighton Beach; Lagoon, Yarra Flats; On the Tamar, Tasmania; Old Cottage, Argyllshire Scotland; Old Huts, Isle of Mull, Scotland and A Grey Day, Glen Falloch, Scotland.

In 1879 he was described as a young artist under engagement to Messrs. Gillow and Co. the firm entrusted with the decoration of Mandeville Hall at Toorak, now known as Loreto Mandeville Hall. On 19 December 1879, Mather's tender of £4700 for the internal decorations of the Exhibition Buildings was accepted by the Building Committee of the International Exhibition after providing "other evidence of the possession of special ability."

Mather exhibited again in 1880 and 1881. On 27 October 1881 he was elected to the Council of the Victorian Academy of Arts. In April 1882 he exhibited a number of oil paintings and water colours at the annual exhibition of the Academy, Noted for his industriousness: "there are no less than 11 works bearing his name. Most of them are of rural or woodland scenery, rendered with much artistic feeling, whether in oil or water-colour." Later that year he exhibited another six works in the First Black and White Exhibition of the Academy.

He was married on 16 October 1882 to Miss Jessie Pines Best, a daughter of Captain James Best, a pilot of Hobson's Bay. Together they had one daughter and three sons; Margaret Playfair, John Allan, Louis Melville (died in infancy), and Leslie Frank Strand (died in 1919).

== John Mather's 'plein air' work ==
John Mather was one of the early practitioners of painting en plein air in Victoria. Contemporary reports noted that since his arrival in Melbourne "Mr Mather has been travelling all through Victoria in the employment of his brush and pencil and has given to the public so many examples of his skill in depicting the most picturesque localities."

Mather had an early interest in the landscape around Heidelberg, demonstrated by Wattles at Heidelberg and Leaving off Work, Heidelberg Road, both exhibited with the Victorian Academy of Arts in 1881. He exhibited the following year, Near the Yarra, Heidelberg and Stubble Field, Heidelberg. Another example is a water colour of bushland and river, The Yarra at Heidelberg, signed and dated 1882.

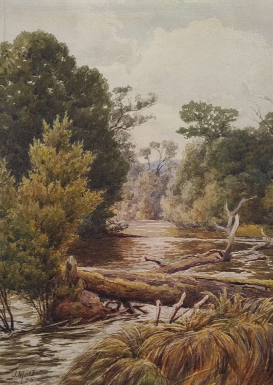
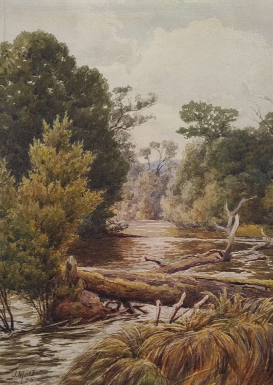
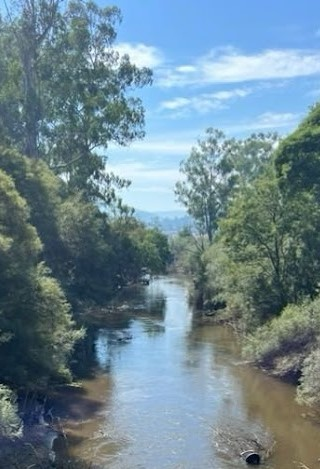
On the Upper Yarra 1885 J. Mather (Note: On the Upper Yarra 1885 J. Mather View from Maxwells Road Bridge HeaIesville March 2024 John Mather most likely painted On the Upper Yarra near Rourke’s Bridge where the old route from Lilydale to Healesville crossed the Yarra River. The Maxwell's Road bridge now stands nearby in its place. Looking north east from this bridge - the river, vegetation, the distant view of a mountain or hill, the colours and tones of the scene are still remarkedly similar to that rendered by the artist in 1885. Historic photographs of Rourke's Bridge circa 1875-85 confirm the riverscape and vegetation depicted in the painting. The title of the painting, or its location, is partly hand written on the reverse of the watercolour backing mount and reads On the U or On the Y. The remainder of the title has been lost when the original back mount of the water colour was trimmed. The painting is illustrative of the subject matter he painted at this time and also rendered in his other works. An 1885 description of A Peep at the Upper Yarra, "where it brawls over boulders and gurgles under mossy tree trunks that span the stream with their prostrate forms is a lovely study of forest and river" could apply to this work but there are other paintings of similar composition.)

Between 1882 and 1885, Mather painted oil and watercolour landscapes around Sunbury and Riddell's Creek, displaying them at exhibitions of the Art Society of New South Wales, the Victorian Academy of Arts, the 1884 Ballarat Fine Art Exhibition, and in his studio at 95 Collins Street East.

In autumn 1885, he made two trips to the Upper Yarra valley, which was described as an artist’s paradise with richly varied and delightfully picturesque scenery. In April 1885, he displayed the results of his first trip to the Upper Yarra valley in his studio.

In 1885, Mather was also noted as amongst the artists travelling to Heidelberg, the first organised effort in Melbourne to form a group for landscape painting. The participants included Arthur Streeton, Walter Withers, John Longstaff, Fredrick McCubbin, E. Phillips Fox, Louis Abrahams, Jane Sutherland, Tudor St George Tucker, John Llewellyn Jones, Tom Humphrey (artist), and Fredrick Williams.

These Sunday painting excursions predated the artist's camps of Tom Roberts, Arthur Streeton, Walter Withers, Frederick McCubbin, Charles Condor and others at Box Hill, Mentone, and Heidelberg, and elsewhere. As the camps grew in popularity, they became important gathering places for artists and visitors alike. John Mather is noted as being a member of the Eaglemont camp where he is also recorded as addressing a large gathering of eighty artists, students and their friends.

Around this time, Streeton, then about twenty-two, 'sketched' with Paterson and Mather, regarding himself as a student in their company. (Note: Mather painted 'Blue Bay Kilcunda' in September 1888. Mather and Paterson subsequently exhibited several works depicting the Kilcunda coastline and cliffs at the Victorian Artists Society exhibitions held in November 1888 and May 1889 At the May 1889 exhibition, Streeton, aged 22, exhibited a work titled An Impression from the Deep. He used the same title for another work painted in July 1889, which depicted a view from the Kilcunda coastline towards Cape Woolamai. Streeton later recalled being invited by Mather and Paterson to join them on a painting trip to Kilcunda.) He later wrote: “We three painters met at Flinders Street Station, Melbourne … They were my seniors by about fifteen years, and it was kind of them to invite me to join in their painting trip to the ocean shore at Kilcunda.”

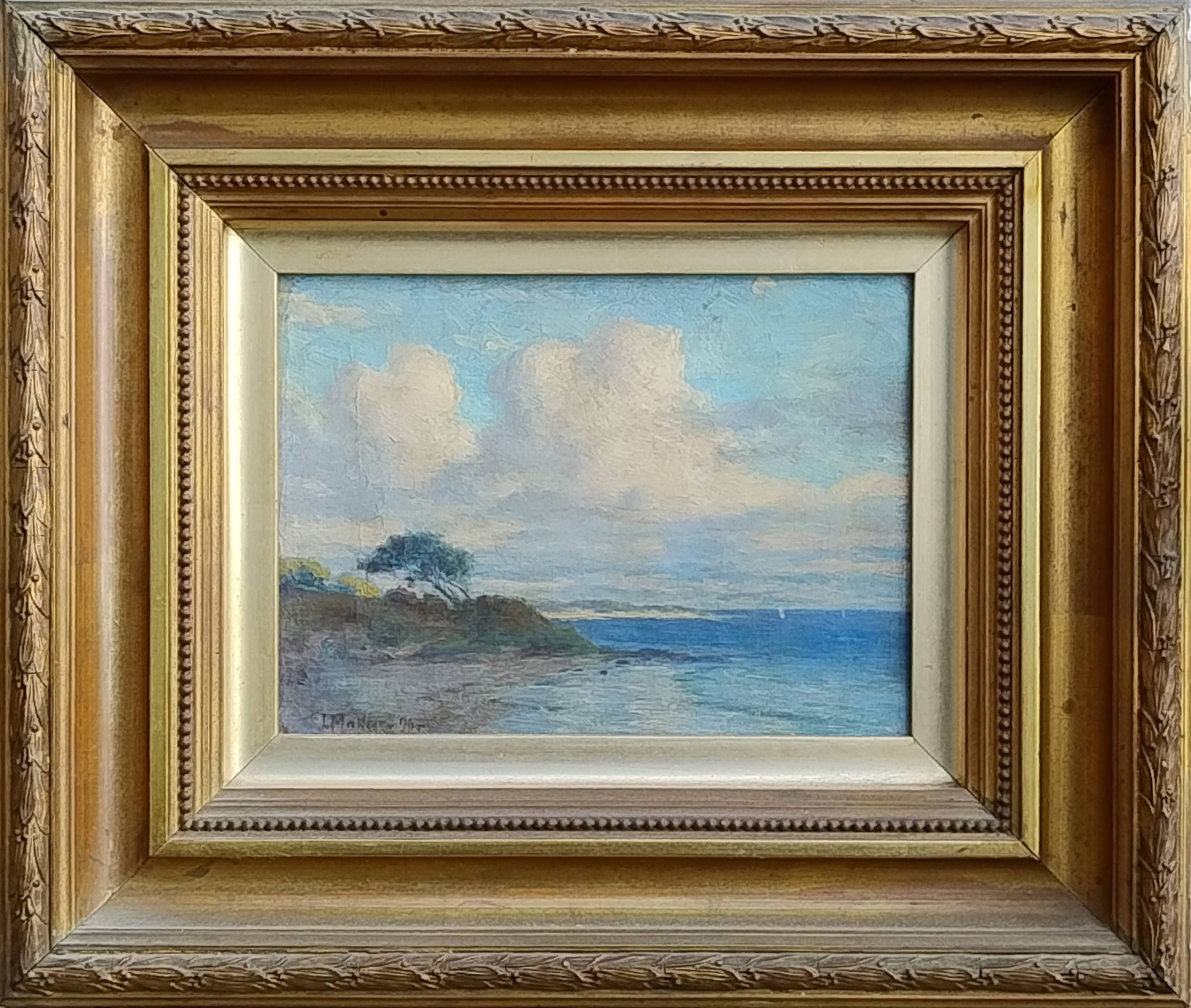
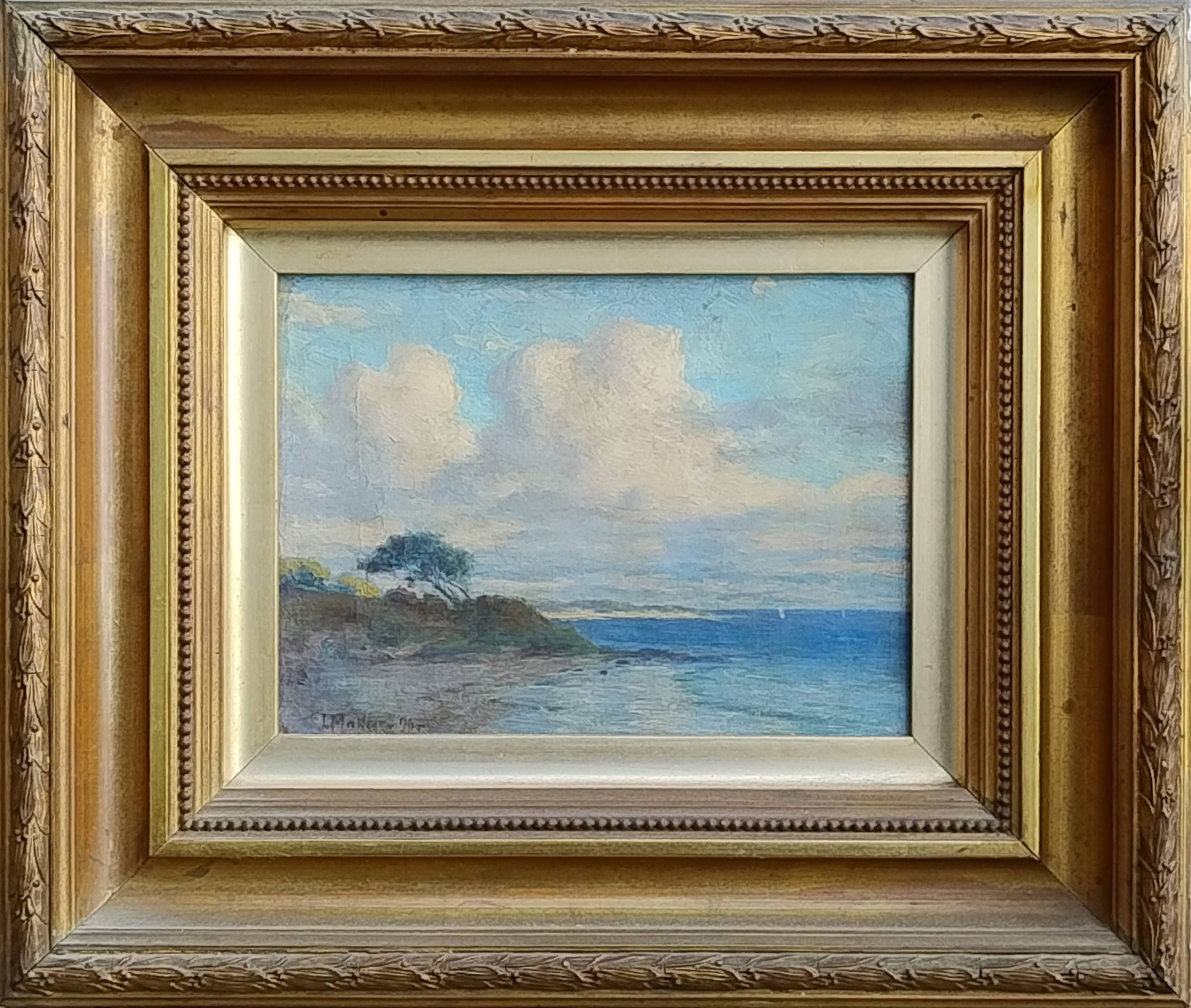
A Glimpse of Brighton Beach 1896 John Mather, "A very small painting ... remarkable for charm of composition and good suggestion of wind in the strain of ti-trees" (Note: A Glimpse of Brighton Beach 1896 John Mather A Glimpse of Brighton Beach (1896) depicts the Brighton Beach shoreline looking south from near Wellington Street, Brighton. In the middle ground is a tree-covered point now occupied by the Brighton Life Saving Club. The point obscures most of the more substantial bathing beach at Dendy Street, where the iconic bathing boxes are now a popular attraction for locals and tourists. Whilst mostly hidden, the southernmost arc of the beach remains visible. In the far distance, the coastline merges with beaches around Green Point, aptly named when viewed from this aspect or from the waters of Port Phillip. A white sail is visible off Green Point, where a race mark was commonly placed for Brighton Yacht Club races from the 1880s and where yachting marks continue to be positioned today. Mather lived nearby at The Pines in Wellington Street, Brighton, from about 1895 to 1900, approximately 300 metres from the location where he painted this work. Painted on a small canvas measuring just 6 by 8 inches, it was likely produced en plein air, given its size and direct, spontaneous execution. The painting remains in its original elaborate frame, typical of those supplied by John Thallon, suggesting that it may have been exhibited. Brighton Beach was a favourite subject of Mather's, and he produced many works of varying sizes and media depicting the beach, typically under the simple title Brighton Beach. The catalogue for the exhibition of landscapes by Mather at the Athenaeum, Melbourne, on 24 October 1904, lists four oil paintings: No. 35 Brighton Beach (£2 2s), No. 42 Study, Brighton Beach (£2 2s), No. 51 Brighton Beach (£2 2s), and No. 63 Brighton Beach (£25, illustrated), together with an etching, No. 100 Brighton Beach (10s 6d). In 1896, however, only a single small work titled Brighton Beach was exhibited at the Victorian Artists Society Annual Exhibition, where it remained unsold (Catalogue No. 14, Brighton Beach, £2 2s, oil painting). Reviewing that exhibition, a contemporary report comments A Glimpse of Brighton Beach, together with several other works by Mather, as being "foremost among the sterling artists exhibits." Two years later, in 1898, an exhibition at Paterson Brothers, 163 Collins Street, Melbourne included the following description: "A very small painting, called Brighton Beach, remarkable for charm of composition and good suggestion of wind in the strain of ti-trees, is by Mr J. Mather." The title and description of the painting's small size, composition, and subject closely match the present work and suggest that it may be the same painting, earlier noted as A Glimpse of Brighton Beach. While Brighton Beach is geographically accurate and is the title recorded in the exhibition catalogue, A Glimpse of Brighton Beach was also used historically and serves to distinguish the work from Mather's many other paintings of Brighton Beach. The painting also has a strong connection to Evening, Brighton Beach in the collection of the National Gallery of Victoria. Painted the following year from the same beach, both works share similar cloud formations, parallel reflections of the sky in the shallow waters at low tide, the distinctive blue hue of the sea, and darker beach sands. Mather's affection for the view is further demonstrated by the similar view and elements in the etching Brighton Beach (1900), now in the collection of the National Gallery of Australia. Mather produced numerous paintings and etchings of Brighton Beach and its characteristic tea trees, many of them from the beach near the street where he lived. Other artists were also living and working in the area. Frederick McCubbin lived at the corner of New Street and Kinane Street, Brighton, close to the location where he painted Summer Sea in 1895, at Dendy Street Beach Brighton. Around the same time, May Vale painted a view of the Brighton Beach coastline with two small bathing boxes. Together these works and others indicate the strong aesthetic appeal of the Brighton Beach coastline to this group of artists.)

Mather's affinity with en plein air is revealed when discussing a broad range of his favourite paintings in the National Gallery of Victoria. Commenting on Peter Graham's Autumnal Showers he states; "he was in intimate converse with nature, when every new effect was an unspeakable joy, a new delight and a fresh discovery...[the work] ... must have been a labour of love." (Note: In 1906 John Mather nominated a number paintings, varied in style and subject matter, as his favourites in the National Gallery. Emphasising that he believed there was no orthodox creed in art, and no absolute rule for a good painting. He pointed to the tension between the need for an artist to develop a style or manner, and when successful an artist becoming trapped by that effort. Mather nominated as his favourite paintings: • Peter Graham 1869 Autumnal Showers • John Macallan Swan 1891 African Panthers • August Friedrich Schenck 1878 Anguish • William Quiller Orchardson 1887 The First Cloud • John Pettie 1866 Arrest for Witchcraft • Camille Pissarro 1897 Boulevard Montmartre • J.M.W Turner c.1826 Okehampton Castle All of these paintings are illustrated, amongst others, in the 1908 Illustrated Catalogue of the National Gallery of Victoria printed and published for the Trustees of the Public Library, Museums and National Gallery of Victoria. In 1906 he considered Boulevard Montmartre. by Pissarro to be the best painting purchased through the Felton Bequest, both for its artistic rendering of a very difficult subject, and for its remarkable truth to nature. He described it as a splendid example of the French School of Impressionist at its best. He hoped the work would encourage artists and citizens in Melbourne to see the beauty of their own streets and goes on to state: "The subject itself is not finer than many of our Melbourne streets; it only requires the artist; the life, movement, and interest are just as intense here as in Paris. The summer is longer here; the sunlight is brighter; the sky more blue, but the patron is conspicuous by his absence.")

When completing a painting of Mt Feathertop, Mather undertook a daily walk of 12 miles for a fortnight to complete the work "... leaving the picture on the spot where he was painting it, and frequently returning to find it so buried in snow that he had to actually dig it out ..."

Whilst some of Mather's larger pictures were painted indoors from sketches; Alexander Colquhoun, painter and art critic, believed that "it was when seated out in the open with a small block or pochade before him that he was at his happiest and came nearest to the realisation of his ideals as an artist."

== Career ==
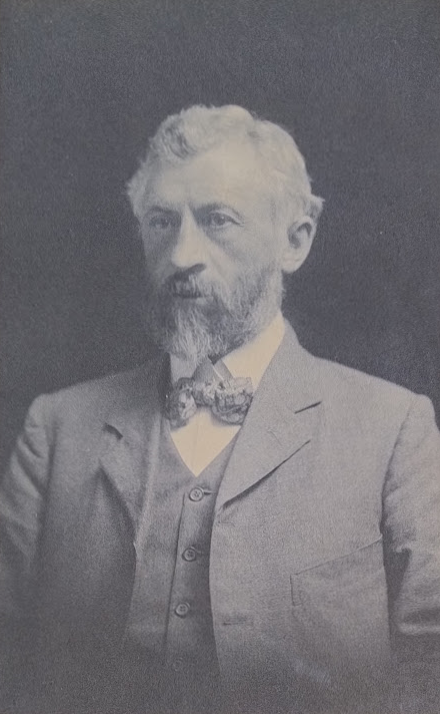
John Mather circa 1905

In 1878, John Mather joined the Victorian Academy of Arts and in 1881 he was elected to its Council.

During this time Mather was also responsible for the decoration of the Royal Exhibition Building, Melbourne. Mather’s design for the exhibition picture galleries reflected his artistic sensibility, using ceiling colours to avoid reflections and provide neutral lighting, along with wall tones to suit differing light conditions. (Note: Contemporary reports on the decoration of the exhibition buildings describe in detail Mather's thinking behind the design and colour schemes and notes: "The decoration of the building is also progressing very satisfactorily under the personal supervision of Mr. Mather, the successful designer, and we must say the design, and the way the work is being earned out, does him infinite credit. The ceiling of the western nave is now finished, and the effect of the colouring is very fine. The tender greys and indefinite blue have a very aerial appearance, and the finished celling seems to the naked eye to be at least 30ft. higher than it was before it was coloured. The principals of the roof are treated with lines and colours in such a manner as to show their true construction and the necessity of strength in them. In the panels under the windows of the nave there are some very subtle harmonies of green and purple blues all in rather a low tone of colour. The intention of the decorator seems to have bean to keep the whole tone of his colouring very quiet, in order that it might not compete with the exhibits, but rather act as a background to them. In the decoration of the dome, however, an entirely different principle will be followed, and it will be coloured in the most sumptuous fashion. Figures symbolical of the arts and sciences, trophies of the peaceful arts, and the shields of all nations will make up the details of the decorations of the dome. As yet but very little idea of the design can be formed, as the artists have only just commenced in the upper part, and are following on the heels of the plasterers. Mr. Mather has apparently recognised the necessity of preserving the light in the picture galleries in its native purity. The tints on the ceiling are such as will throw no coloured reflections on the pictures, but will rather illumine them with a neutral light. It is intended to colour the walls of the south gallery with a warm purple tint, as the light from the south is always colder than that from the north. In the latter galleries, where there will be the warm sunlight, a cool olive green is proposed for the walls, which will no doubt be a very good background for pictures.")

Later he joined the bohemian Buonarotti Club, camping with other members on plein-air painting expeditions, and served, with Frederick McCubbin, Louis Abrahams, Jane Sutherland, and Tom Roberts on the club's exhibition selection committee. As a painter, Mather was also involved in the bohemian Artists' Camps of Sydney.

In 1886, together with other professional artists, he was a founding member of the Australian Artists' Association, serving on the Executive Committee, as well its Exhibition Selection and Hanging Committees. The Australian Artist's Association membership grew to over 160 members and held three exhibitions in 1886 and 1887. (Note: In 1885 Mr. J.T. Buxton erected a new art premises, Buxton's Art Gallery in Swanston Street, opposite the Melbourne Town Hall. In June 1886 a meeting was held at the Buxton's Art Gallery where it was unanimously resolved that an exhibition be held annually in central Melbourne to be called the Winter Exhibition of Works by Australian Artists. John Mather was amongst those present, as well as: Mr. Addison, Mr. G. R. Ashton, Mr. Percival Ball, Signor Catani, Mr. J.W. Curtis, Mr. McCubbin, Mr. Gibbs, Signor Habres, Mr. Kahler, Signor Tocein, Signor Neele, Mr. Patterson, Mr. Rolando, Mr. T. Roberts and Mr. Turner. The first annual exhibition of the Australian Artists' Association was opened 8 Sept 1886 in Buxton's Art Gallery. Contemporary reports highlighted the following artists, including John Mather; J. F. Paterson, Herr Kabler, Julian Ashton, S. R. Ashton, C. Rolando, F. McCubbin, A. Loureiro, Alice Chapman, T. Roberts, J. G. Gibbs, L. Buvelot, Vauder, Ley, and C. W. Foster. (Note: Other artists described as exhibiting included: Mr. E. Fraser, Mr. W. H. Withers, Mr. Llewelyn Jones, Mr. Robertson Gow, Mr. G. P. Morrison, Mr. Julian Gibbs, Mr. J. W. Curtis, Mr. J. A. Turner, Mr. James Murray, Mr. E. A'Beckett, Signor Ugo Catani, Miss Alice Chapman, Miss F. Fuller, Miss Walker, Mr. W. Barratt, Mr. Julian Ashton, Mr. George Ashton, Mr. C. W. Foster, Mrs. George Parsons, Mr. James Robertson, Mr. G. H. Taylor, Mr. Robert Gow, Mrs. F. C. Rowan, Mr. Fraser, Mr. Malcolm Campbell, Mr. Louis Abraham, Mrs. Roth, Mr. R. Kretschmann, Mr. J. S. Wilson, Mr. Carl Kahler, Mr. J. R. Ashton, Mr. Percival Ball,) Louis Abrahams 1886 etching of an 1880 Australian pastoral landscape by John Mather. Exhibited at the First Annual Exhibition of the Australian Artists' Association. (Note: Etching, after J. Mather by L. Abrahams is the first etching exhibited in an art society's exhibition in Australia. Etching, after J. Mather is listed in the catalogue of the First Annual Exhibition of the Australian Artists' Association held in September 1886 at the Buxton Gallery. The etching illustrates an 1880 painting by John Mather and provides an insight into his work of that time. The etching demonstrates the professional and personal relationships between the artists that formed Australian Artists' Association. Further highlighted by a painting titled Maggie Mather, John Mather's daughter, exhibited by Louis Abrahams in the 1887 Winter Exhibition of the Australian Artists' Association. Also the 1887 painting by John Mather of The artist (Louis Abrahams) at his easel.) At the time it was observed: "that a distinctively Australian school of landscape painters is being formed, who look at colonial scenery with their own eyes, and not through European spectacles; and although they are perhaps a little too much under the influence of the French impressionists, of whose works a good many examples have reached us, they certainly aim at a faithful and vivid, if free and sketchy, reproduction of local form and colour." About 85 oil paintings and watercolours were exhibited. Some of the artists work, including that of John Mather, were commented upon: "It is interesting to watch the general leaning of our young artists and art students towards the French methods of landscape painting; their avoidance of too much definition of form, and their disposition to secure striking effects by colour laid on in broad masses. This is observable in Mr. Mather's bit of genuine nature, "On the Watts River;"... Turning to the water-colour drawings, the eye is arrested by Mr. Mather's "Cape Wollamai, Phillip Island," and his "View on the Saltwater River," which are almost as solid in colour and as full of strength as oil paintings. The first is a very striking picture, and perfectly true to nature. The second resembles a drawing in black and white, as there is only here and there a slight suggestion of colour. In both compositions the masterly treatment of clouds and water is too obvious to be overlooked." After the first exhibition, the Australian Artist's Association was formalised. In October 1886 the rules of the Association were developed and an Executive Committee elected consisting of Patterson, Ashton, Mather, Ball, Gow, Loureiro and Catani. Later Roberts and McCubbin were added to the committee. The Association went on to hold two more exhibitions in the summer and winter of 1887. The 1887 Exhibition Selection Committee comprised Roberts, Mather and Patterson with a sculptor and architect to be nominated. The Hanging Committee comprised Ball, Mather, Patterson and Ashton. The Australian Artist's Association exhibitions of 1886 and 1887 included works such as McCubbin's Lost 1886, Robert's The Sunny South (painting), Streeton's June Evening Box Hill as well as works by Withers, Patterson and other artists including John Mather.)

John Mather was also a member of the Victorian Academy of Arts and worked towards bringing the two organisations together. In March 1888, the Academy and the Association amalgamated. On John Mather's motion, seconded by John Ford Paterson, the amalgamated organisation was named the Victorian Artists Society.

The amalgamation of the Australian Artists' Association and Victorian Academy of Arts in 1888 established the Victorian Artists' Society, of which Mather served as its president for twelve years in 1893–1900, 1906–1908 and 1911.

In 1892 he was appointed to the Board of Trustees of the Public Library, Museums and National Gallery of Victoria. Mather was a member of the Felton Bequest Committee from 1905 to 1916 and as trustee, strongly supported Australian art.

In 1912 along with Frederick McCubbin, Max Meldrum, Walter Withers, Mather formed the breakaway Australian Art Association.

== Exhibition history ==
Throughout his career John Mather exhibited his works in Victoria as well other Australian states and overseas.

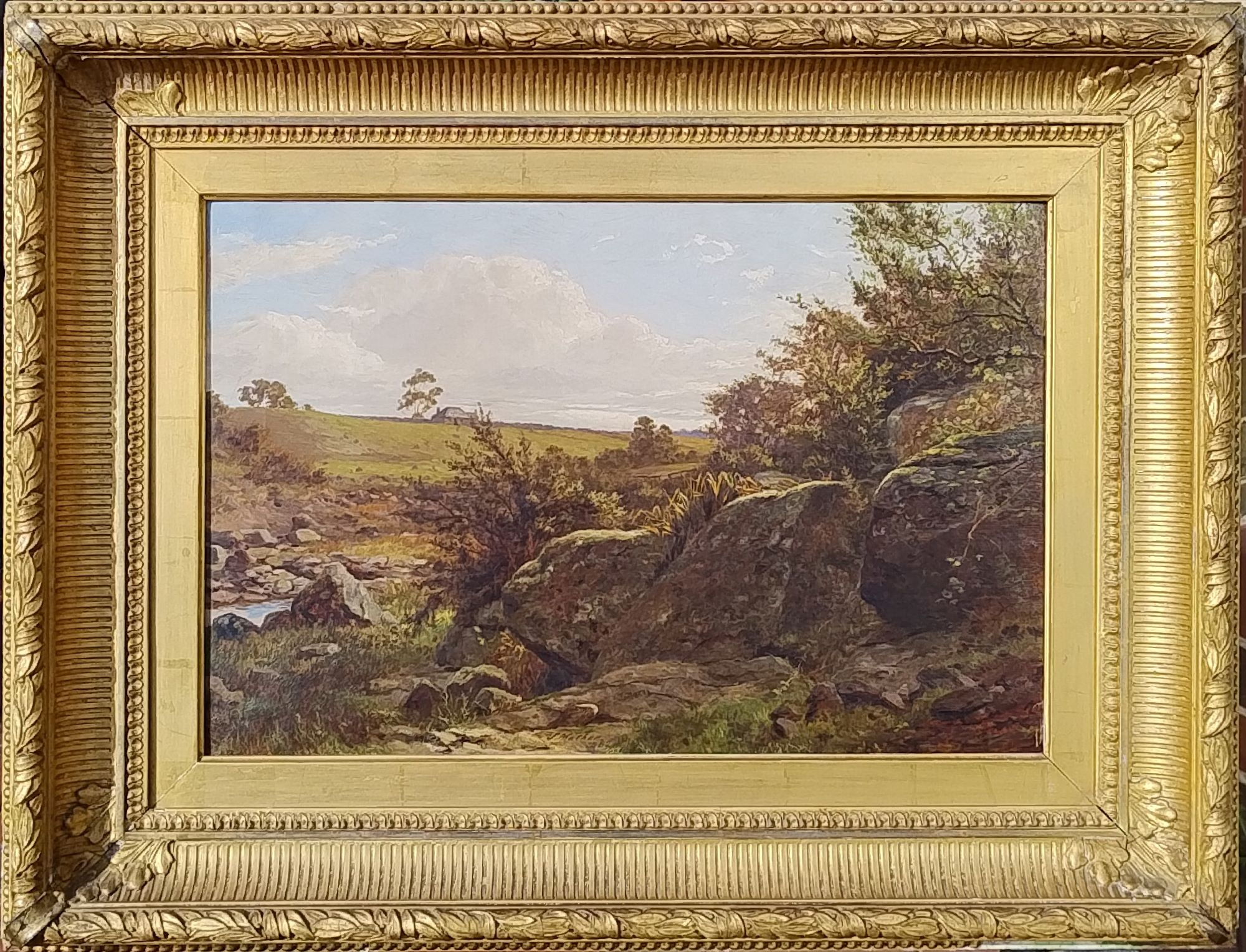
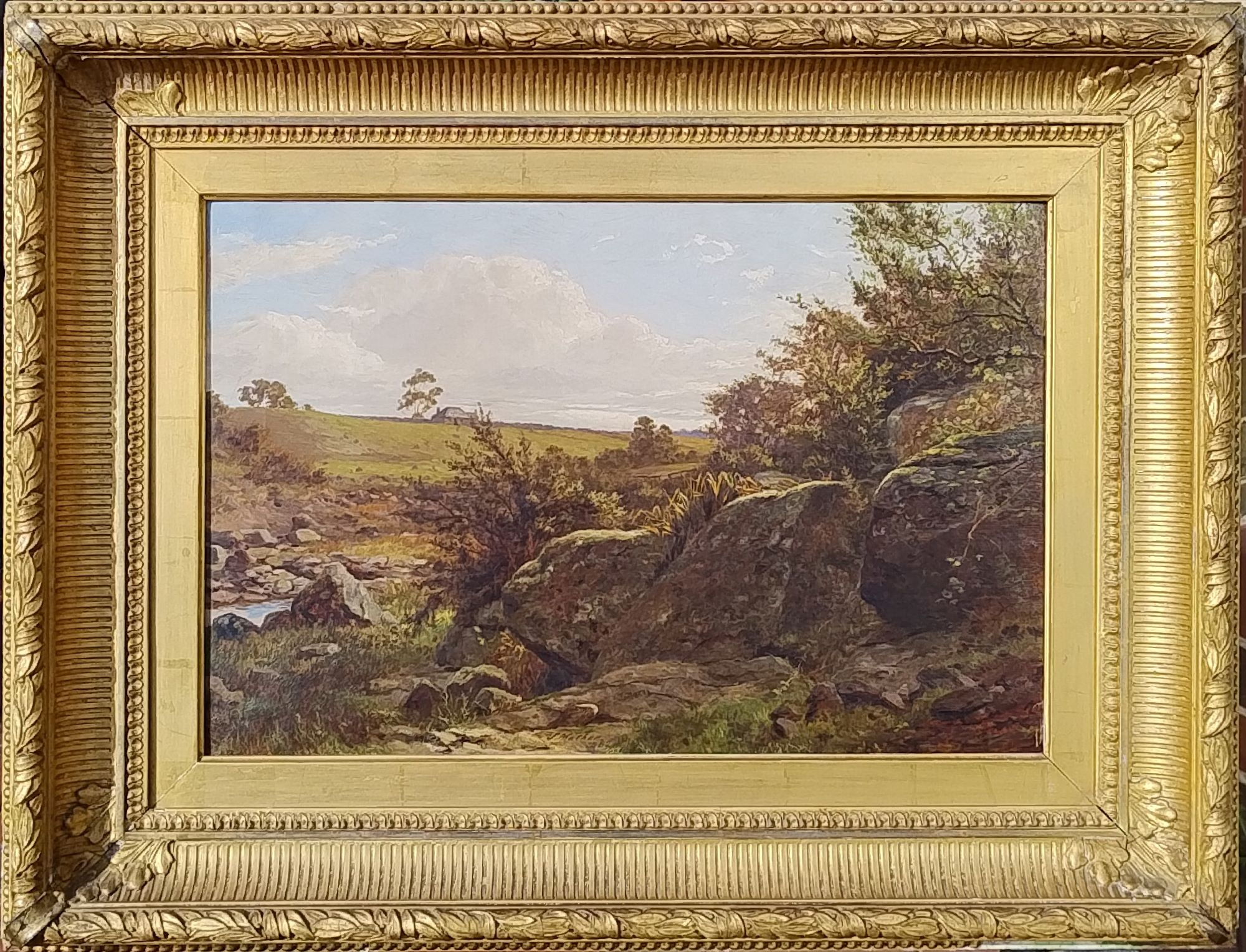
A Sunny Bank 1882 John Mather (possibly exhibited at the 1883-1884 Calcutta International Exhibition) (Note: A Sunny Bank 1882 John Mather (possibly exhibited 1883-84 Calcutta International Exhibition) Between 1882 and 1885, Mather painted a number of oil and watercolour landscapes around Sunbury and Riddell's Creek. These works were included in exhibitions of the Art Society of New South Wales and the Victorian Academy of Arts, as well as the Ballarat Fine Art Exhibition (June 1884), and at his studio at 93 Collins Street East. A Sunny Bank 1882 has appeared at auction under various generic titles, however the landscape is identifiable as that near Riddell's Creek. The composition's distinctive rocky outcrops, creek-side vegetation, and distant sunlit hillside with farmhouse also resemble the landscape and features in other illustrated works by Mather that are titled or otherwise identified as views of Riddell's Creek. The work is an oil on canvas, signed and dated 1882. It is housed in a large, elaborate John Thallon frame, suggesting that it was intended for exhibition. The canvas measures 53.5 × 36.0 cm (sight size 52.5 × 34.5 cm) within a 77.5 × 59.5 cm frame. Mather generally gave his works descriptive titles reflecting their principal subject. Most were named after a locality or geographical feature. Others a prominent aspect of the composition such as Passing Showers or Moonlight. More poetic titles, such as The Weary Sun hath made a Golden Set were comparatively uncommon, although larger exhibition works occasionally received titles such as Reflections and The Golden West. The exhibition records indicate at least eight distinct titles possibly associated with Mather's work around Riddell's Creek: • A Study of Rocks • A Sunny Bank • An Australian Creek • Riddell's Creek • A Summer Morning • A Study (possibly later exhibited as Waterfall on Riddell's Creek) • A Weedy Bank • Waterfall on Riddell's Creek Illustrated surviving works include the watercolour Riddell's Creek (1883), the watercolour A Study of Rocks, Riddell's Creek (1884) and the oil painting Summer Morning. The titles of the various works, their dates (when noted), media references, exhibition details, descriptions, and images (when available), indicate two plausible candidates for the 1882 work: A Sunny Bank and the later Riddell's Creek. The Sydney Morning Herald described, A Sunny Bank, exhibited in March 1883, as "one of the most charming landscapes in the exhibition, the sky being especially admirable." The oil painting carried a substantially higher catalogue price (£26 5s) than the later paintings titled Riddell's Creek. The paintings exhibited as Riddell's Creek in 1884 and 1885 also received favourable reviews. In 1884, The Age described a painting as "a delicious bit of nature, skillfully put together and remarkably just in colour." Reviewing the 1885 exhibition, the newspaper wrote that another painting "stands out brilliantly from its surroundings as a genuine work of art", praising its purity and truth of colour, composition, and natural feeling. Whilst Riddell's Creek describes the location, A Sunny Bank more accurately describes the brightly illuminated hillside beyond the darker foreground rocks and aligns with Mather's practice of naming a work after an aspect of the composition. Together, the early 1882 date, the work's size and quality, its elaborate John Thallon frame, and the exhibition prices of comparable works suggest that A Sunny Bank is the more likely exhibition title. A Sunny Bank, was among the works exhibited in the 1883-1884 Calcutta International Exhibition including another work by John Mather A Morning Walk (1883). A Morning Walk subsequently returned to Australia and entered the collection of the Ballarat Fine Art Gallery through the James Oddie Bequest. The apparent absence of A Sunny Bank from Victorian exhibition records following the Calcutta International Exhibition suggests that it may have remained overseas. The earliest documented provenance places this present work in London, where it was illustrated and sold at Sotheby's in October 1991. The auction date is also written in chalk on the reverse of the frame. Following a period in private ownership, the painting reappeared at auction in Melbourne Australia in 2026 before entering another private collection. Identifying A Sunny Bank as a landscape of Riddell's Creek places the painting within Mather's series of paintings of the district and suggests that it was among the works exhibited at the 1883-1884 Calcutta International Exhibition.)

Prior to emigrating to Australia he exhibited at:

- Royal Glasgow Institute of the Fine Arts in 1871 and 1876.
- Royal Scottish Academy Edinburgh in 1873 and 1877.

In Victoria he exhibited in:

- The Victorian Academy of Arts Annual Exhibitions from 1879 to 1887.
- The Victorian Academy of Arts Black and White Exhibitions of 1882 and 1883.
- Ballarat Fine Art Exhibition 1884.
- The Australian Artists Association Exhibitions of 1886 and the Summer and Winter Exhibitions of 1887.
- The Victorian Society of Artists Exhibitions of Spring 1888, Autumn 1888, Winter 1889, 1895, Autumn 1900, 1904, 1905 and 1909.
- The Victorian Society of Artists Exhibition of Water Colour and Black and White Drawings 1890.
- The Victorian Society of Artists Annual Exhibitions from 1890 to 1911, (other than in 1902 and 1903).
- The Australian Art Association exhibitions from 1913 to 1916.

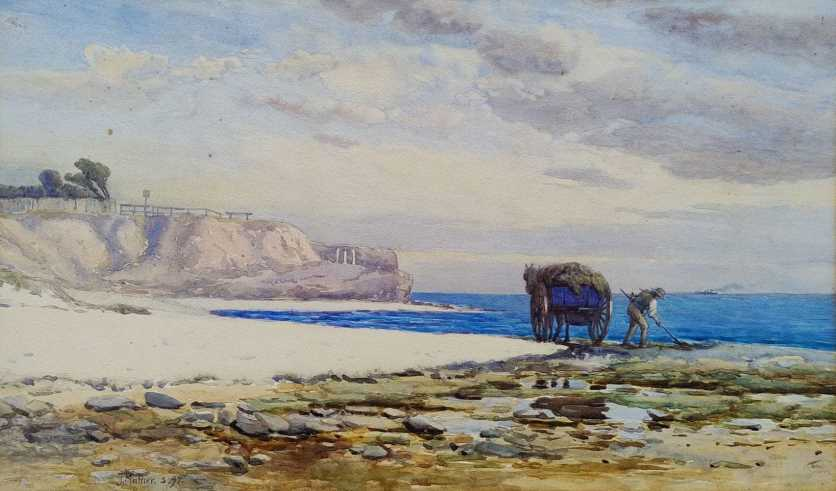
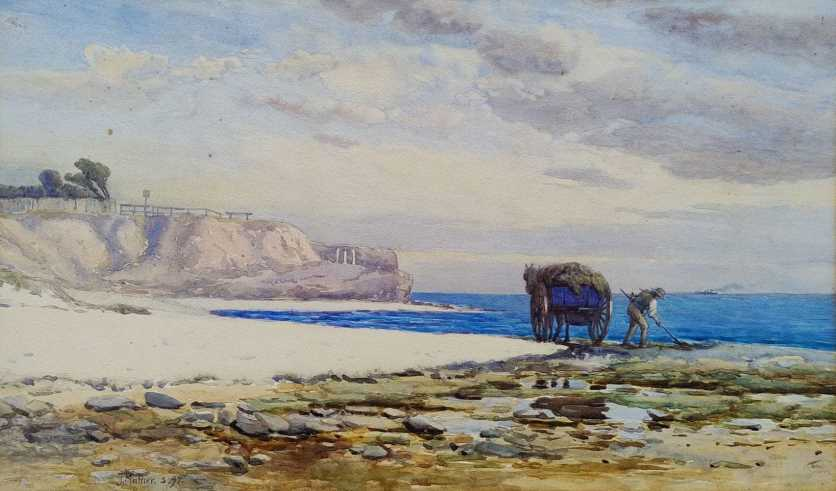
Gathering Seaweed 1897 by John Mather probably exhibited at the Twenty-First Annual Exhibition of the Royal Art Society of New South Wales in 1900 (Note: John Mather 1897 Gathering Seaweed John Mather painted Gathering Seaweed in 1897 when he was residing at Wellington Street, Brighton. The water colour was probably exhibited as Gathering Sea-Weeds in 1900 at the Twenty-First Annual Exhibition of the Art Society of New South Wales. The title Gathering Sea-Weeds is uncommon for John Mather compared to the titles of his other paintings, with only one other similar title,Carting Seaweed dated 1884. In 2024 the painting was sold at auction in Selbourne United Kingdom with the title Gathering Seaweed. The backing of the watercolour has Brighton Beach written on the reverse likely its location rather than its exhibition title, given the subject matter of the painting. The watercolour depicts a person with horse and cart gathering seaweed from the beach at Holloway Bend, Brighton Beach looking towards Green Point. The painting provides a historical view of Green Point prior to the construction of coastal protection works. Contemporary reports and art critics note that John Mather is known for the accurate depiction of the view before him. Old photographs prior to the coastal protection works at Green Point and Holloway Bend confirm the aspect of the cliff illustrated in the painting, the detail of signs and posts, the disposition of the beach, reserve fencing and coast line. Later aerial photographs show a bluestone seawall under construction in the 1930’s. Subsequent filling and later rock batters have extended the point seawards. The gathering of seaweed is documented in the Diaries of Mrs Thomas Anne Ward Cole of St Ninians Brighton (1867 - 1882) in which she notes that men at work on the St Ninian estate; "were carting sea-weed to the paddocks and ploughing it in." Two years before the date of the watercolour, in January 1895, The Argus also confirms the practice of carting away seaweed stating: "The late storms have lodged large quantities of jelly like seaweed on the beach and this while decaying is of course unpleasant whether one finds it at Brighton or at Lorne. The council has done the best it can probably in this matter by inviting market gardeners to cart away the weed for manure, and no doubt it would be a first-rate fertiliser." The paintings passage to the United Kingdom is unclear however John Mather himself offers some potential insights. When interviewed in 1913, John Mather remarked: "Though I have never sent any pictures home numbers have found their way to the Old World through visitors purchasing them here. Sir Hartley Williams, one of the late judges of Victoria, took quite a collection of my watercolours with him to England and on a return visit he secured many more. On reaching England again he held a reception, and I am told that there was quite a buzz over Mather’s watercolours." The painting, whether brought back by visitors returning to Europe, part of a collection when resettling to England or some other route is representative of the national and international art market of the turn of the 19th Century.)

In the other Australian states, he exhibited in:

- Royal Art Society of New South Wales Annual Exhibitions from 1883 to 1888 as well as in 1892, 1893, 1895, 1899, and 1900.
- The Art Society of Tasmania Annual Exhibitions of 1893 and 1894
- Exhibition of John Mather’s Water Colours, 1911 Trowbridge Bros, Elizabeth Street, Hobart.
- South Australian Society of Arts, September 1913 Mr. J. Mathers Exhibition of paintings and etchings.

Some of his works were part of a New South Wales provincial exhibition of a loan collection of pictures undertaken by the National Art Gallery and Art Association of New South Wales exhibited in:

- 1895 at the Bathurst Technological Museum.
- 1896 at the Goulburn Technological Museum.
- 1897 at the Newcastle Technological Museum.

His works were exhibited in colonial and international exhibitions held in Victoria including the:

- 1888 Melbourne Centennial Exhibition at the Melbourne Exhibition Building Picture Galleries.
- 1890 Exhibition of Works of Victorian Artists and a Loan Collection of Pictures at the Art Gallery of the Exhibition Building.
- 1893 Exhibition of Australian Art, Past and Present at the National Gallery, Swanston Street.
- 1901 Victorian Gold Jubilee Exhibition, Bendigo.

His works were exhibited internationally in:

- 1883-1884 Calcutta International Exhibition which included A Morning Walk by the Yarra now in the collection of the Ballarat Art Gallery.
- 1886 at the Colonial and Indian Exhibition London.
- 1898 at the Grafton Galleries Exhibition of Australian Art in London.
- 1899 at the Earls Court, London Greater Britain Exhibition.

As well as exhibitions at his studios, he held larger solo exhibitions including his:

- 1904 Exhibition of Australian Landscapes by John Mather at the Athenaeum Melbourne.
- 1911 Exhibition of Mr J. Mather’s Paintings, at the Athenaeum Melbourne.
- 1912 Exhibition of Mr J. Mather’s Paintings, at the Athenaeum Melbourne.

In 1916 after his death his wife organised the Memorial Exhibition of Pictures by the late John Mather, at the Athenaeum, Melbourne.

== John Mather's studio ==
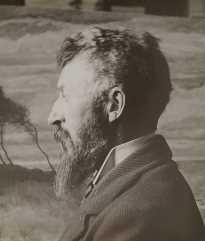
John Mather in his studio before a partially completed painting.

Painting en plein air has been overemphasised and the role of studio work understated in Australian art history. Whilst periodically undertaking outdoor painting, many Australian artists maintained studios in the cities.

John Mather had a number of studios throughout his career and used them for his art, both painting and etching; as well as art lessons, exhibitions of his work and meetings with fellow artists.

1896 Advertisement Brighton Southern Cross 17 Oct 1896

Mather painted both en plein air and in his studio. His often very large water colours were painted indoors from sketches made in the field. A magic lantern slide of unknown date shows John Mather in his studio posed before a large partially complete watercolour. Likewise in 1898 he is noted as; "expanding his fascinating scrap, "Evening," into a water colour, "The Golden West," of large size and characteristic completeness."

As early as 1881 Mather had a studio at 95 Collins Street Melbourne, and by 1888, a studio at Healesville which he maintained until about 1894. (Note: Mather had a number of homes, studios and other addresses throughout his career, including: 1871 23 Holmes Street, Hamilton, Lanarkshire; 1873 35 Orchard St, Hamilton Lanarkshire; 1876-1877 21 Portland Pl, Hamilton Lanarkshire; 1879 83 Swanston Street Melbourne; 1880 Royal Terrace Nicholson Street; 1881 1 Eaton Terrace Grattan Street Carlton; 1881 Davis Street South Yarra, 1881-1887 95 Collins Street Melbourne; 1885-1888 33 Darling Street, South Yarra; 1885 Artistic Stationery Company (Buxton's) incorporating business of F. Hyman & J. Mather, Artists, Colormen and Stationers and Decorating Business, 69, 71, 131 Swanston Street and 84 Elizabeth Street, Melbourne; 1886-1888 Blannin Street Healesville (Purchased 1881); 1888-1889 3 Murphy Street, South Yarra; 1889-1894 Koombahla, Healesville; 1891-1891 Grosvenor Chambers, 9 Collins Street Melbourne (Occupied Tom Robert's studio); 1891-1913 Austral Building]] 117-119 Collins Street, Melbourne; 1895-1901 The Pines, Wellington Street, Brighton; 1900-1902 136 Alma Rd East St. Kilda (Carhue School for Girls); 1901-1912 156 Alma Rd, East St. Kilda; 1912-1916 Cadzow, 383 Toorak Road, South Yarra)

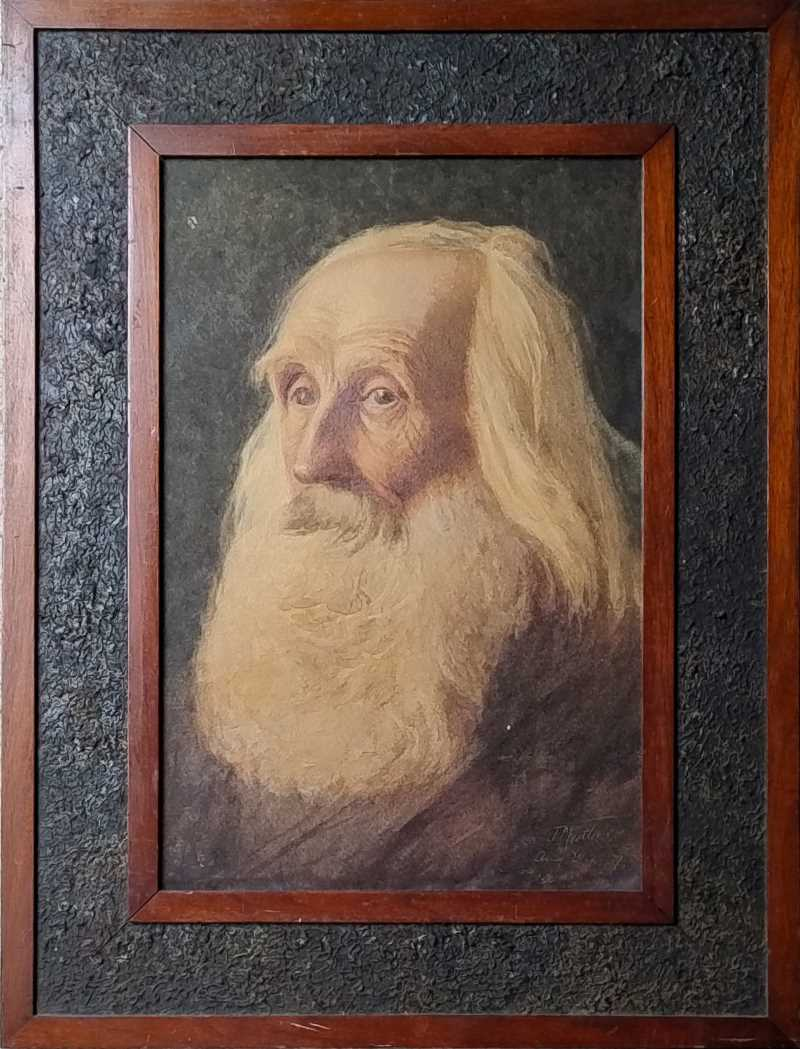
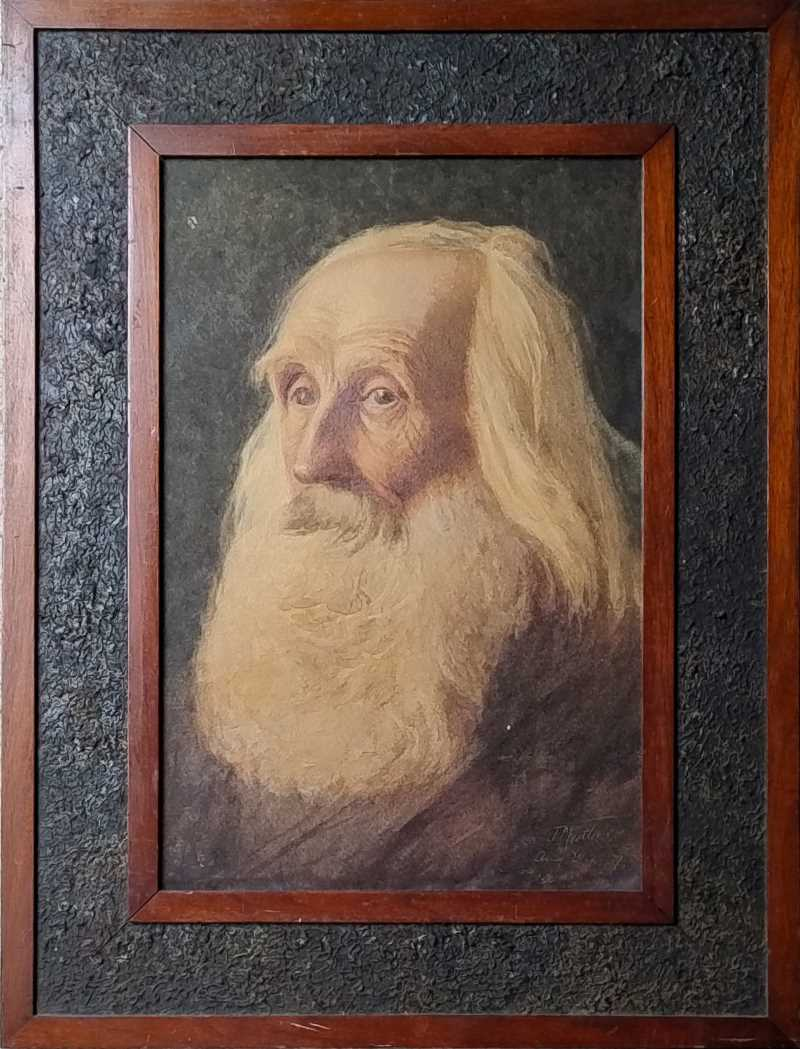
The Model 1897 by John Mather. "They call him old Tom Bowling, after one of his songs. Besides picking up a living as a street musician, he gets a few shillings as an artist’s model." (Note: The Model 1897 by John Mather. “They call him old Tom Bowling, after one of his songs. Besides picking up a living as a street musician, he gets a few shillings as an artist’s model.” The Model was painted by John Mather on 21 August 1897. On the reverse of the watercolour is written 51 The Model, while the frame and backing board bear No. 51 The Old Pensioner. Contemporary reviews describe the painting as: “The sketch of a patriarch, probably Methuselah, is an abler portrayal than the snapshot of a lady in the kimono.”; “Two portraits, one the fine head of a well-known model that might have been ‘General Booth’ in his younger days.”; “A study of an old man is very good, and shows that water-colour in portraiture has some value.”; The painting was among Mather’s most frequently exhibited works. It was exhibited in 1904 in the Exhibition of Australian Landscapes by John Mather as The Model, and was shown in his 1912 solo exhibition as Lot 23 or 30. Although no catalogue survives for the 1916 Exhibition of the Late John Mather’s Paintings, the contemporary press description above and the annotations on the watercolour's reverse, frame and backing board strongly suggest the work was included in that memorial exhibition. The presence of 51 The Model on the watercolour, later altered to No. 51 The Old Pensioner on the frame and backing board, indicates this change likely occurred after 1912. As the number does not correspond with known lots from 1904 or 1912, it is most plausibly the 1916 exhibition number. In 1919, the work appeared at auction under its later title, The Old Pensioner, in the sale of the Mather collection of art conducted by Arthur Tuckett & Son, confirming the shift in how the painting was identified. The subject of the painting resonates with a contemporary account of an artist’s model in Melbourne. Possibly the same man portrayed by Mather, or if not, certainly more broadly illustrative of the kinds of models artists engaged than those typically discussed in historical studio descriptions. Directly from the model himself: “I don’t do many posin’s now. No - no. So many of the artists have emigrated - There’s not many of the old ones about now.” The speaker was “Old B – a model not unknown in studio land here; and; the place was a weatherboard weatherbeaten old tenement, in an obscure lane in a crowded corner on Collingwood Flat. “Once I used to get a note to come to a studio every day.” he continued. “Why, I’ve made more than £2 a week sometimes - Yes,” and he paused to allow for the full effect of this startling assertion. “You have sat for a lot of students and artists?” “Oh, yes; at the National Gallery, the Victorian Artists, and a lot of the studios. Mr. Fox was the first one to engage me; it was through an advertisement: ‘Wanted, an elderly man for a model.’ I was out looking for a job at plasterin’ in the same day, but I called round to see about this other billet; and - got it.” “You were in demand after that?” “Oh, yes - yes. I used to sit – mornin’ afternoon, and night - they was always wantin’ me.” “And what sort of characters did you pose for?” “Oh, all sorts. A sundowner, a bull sticker, a sculptor with a mallet in me’ and like this” and here he suited the action to the word; a carpenter, a Venetian on a ‘gondoleer,’ and I don’t know what. In London I used to pose for the caricaturists on the comic papers. Some of these posins’ were peculiar. Once I ‘ad to be an acrobat, and suspend from a trapeze with me ‘ead ‘anging down.” “I should think that the occupation of model was not altogether healthy, then?” “No - it ain’t, not by any stretch of the imagination. The circulation is impeded, and occasionally some of the attitudes you have to make give you the cramps. Then your eyesight gets affected. When I’m fixed up to suit an artist, I look out for a certain object, and keep my eyes fixed on it alone. But if it’s a room with glass and lots of sunlight coming in, you have to stare so hard, you stare yourself to sleep. Coming out of a warm room into the cold air, too, engenders chills, which induces colds; and, in the summer, the flies annoy you.” “What do models think about all the time they’re posing?” “From the gist of what I’ve heard in company with them, their thoughts are various. Some wonder if they can get a sub.[sic] for a long beer; others wish for the time to come when they can have a smoke; and others, again, wish that the first pose was the last. For myself, being a bibliophilist. I am generally analysing what I have been reading, and so drawing inferences. At odd times I think about my grandchildren.” Later writings expand: “They call him old Tom Bowling, after one of his songs. Besides picking up a living as a street musician, he gets a few shillings as an artist’s model.” The frame itself adds another layer of significance. The bespoke wooden construction and rough-textured coloured frieze reflect Mather’s emerging interest in innovative framing. This interest was noted in 1899,“A new departure in the matter of picture frame designing has been made by Mr. J. Mather. The frame is constructed of glass set in mosaic design, the colors being carefully arranged to harmonize with the picture inclosed. The idea, should it prove practicable from a monetary point of view, is likely to be largely adopted.” The frame also has other handwritten notes: Wattle gold, and River's gleam and, J. Mather, 117 Collins St, Melbourne. Wattle Gold and River Gleam was exhibited in Mather’s studio in 1903, was amongst works that "with more obvious beauty take captive the eye, and fling back with triumphant shout the accusation of "melancholy," so often brought against the Australian landscape." The handwritten note may indicate Mather's reuse of frames for various works. The painting is significant because it is uncharacteristic of Mather’s body of work and consequently demonstrates his broad technical ability as an artist. Uniquely, with contemporary accounts, the work illuminates the life of an older male model engaged in irregular work, earning a living from modelling. The work also documents Mather’s involvement with evolving display practices through its distinctive frame, making it important both as an image and as a material object.)

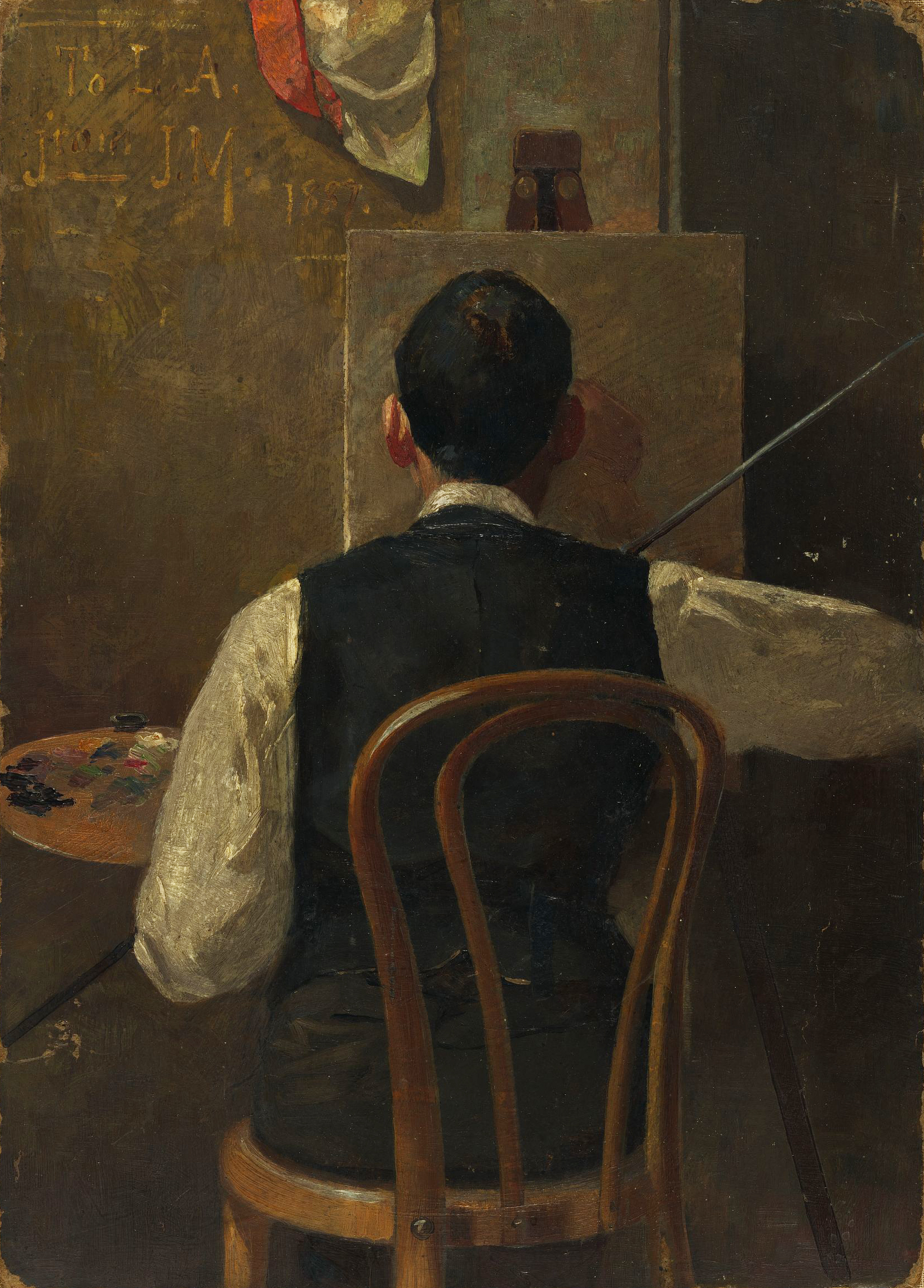
The artist (Louis Abrahams) at his easel 1887 by John Mather

In March 1891, he opened a studio at the Austral Buildings Collins Street Melbourne giving classes for the study of oil and water-color painting. The morning classes were held from ten o'clock until one, and the afternoon from two until five. The studio was filled with landscape sketches and studies for the free use of his pupils.

Described in 1891; "The studio is large and well lit and attractively furnished, while it is not overladen with the heterogenous collection so dear to the heart of the average artist. Mr. Mather’s room is made to appear what it is - a place to work and study, and the number of sketches in oil and water color that adorn the walls, proclaim the busy life of the painter."

He also had studios at his various residences. His last studio at his South Yarra residence was described as a "large low room with polished floor contained a grand piano and a few art treasures and beautiful hangings. The artist's own pictures took up most of the wall space, and the dark polished floor was shining perfection. ... Mather’s own little grandson was sometimes an interested spectator when the artist was at work. Once the child asked 'Why is that cow white, grandpa?' In reply the artist explained the colour scheme of his picture it some length, concluding with the exact reason why, to complete the colour scheme, that cow in the foreground was white. To all of which the five-year-old child listened patiently, then contradicted him briefly with, 'Tis not. It's because it's full of milk'"

== Students ==
John Mather is reported to have "had a wide celebrity as a teacher, and ... there are artists of repute in Melbourne now who commenced their careers in his Austral School in Collins Street." He gave lessons at his studio in the Austral Building and at his residences. His lessons included outdoor sketching excursions, often along the coast, where students used pencil, pen and ink and watercolor.

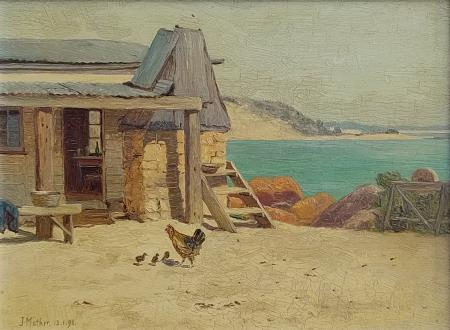
Fisherman's Cottage 1898 John Mather

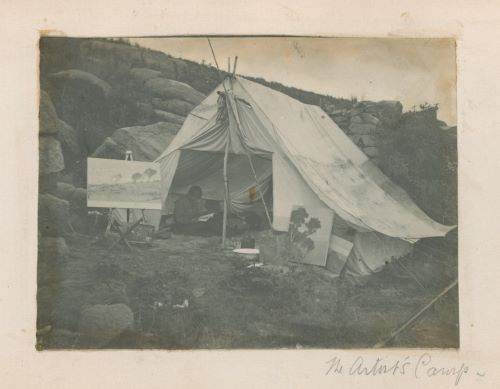
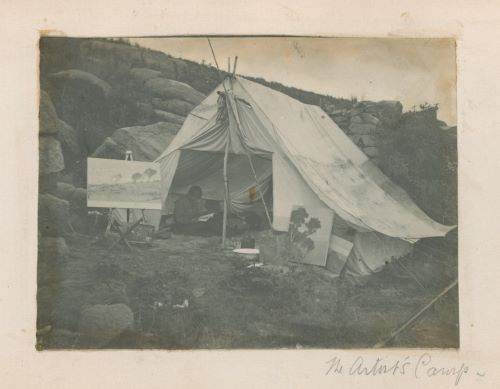
John Mather's Artist Camp c.1903-4 Cape Woolamai (Note: John Mather's Camp, Cape Woolamai, circa 1903/04 in Jessie Traill's, 1900-1911, Autograph Book The photograph of the artist’s camp depicts three of Mather's partially completed paintings: one on an easel and two leaning against the tent. When finished one of the works titled Honeysuckles, Cape Woolamai is later exhibited and illustrated in the Victorian Artists’ Society 16th Annual Exhibition Catalogue, October 1911. The other paintings in the photograph also have subjects and compositions similar to Mather's known paintings from Cape Woolamai. Cape Woolamai was a frequent subject for John Mather, who produced more than a dozen oil paintings, watercolours, and drawings of the area under titles including Cape Woollamai Phillip Island, Cape Wollamai, and Cape Woollomai. The spelling Cape Wollamai was recorded by George Bass in 1802 and later evolved into the modern form, Cape Woolamai. Most of the works depicting Cape Woolamai date from 1885–86, 1898, 1903–04, and 1911-12 corresponding with periods when Mather camped at Cape Woolamai and San Remo. The date for the photograph of Mather’s camp is supported by signed works including Near Cape Wollamai, 1903Blue and Gold, 1903 and Cape Wollamai, Phillip Island, 1904 Jessie Traill’s autograph book (1900–1911) and 1903 sketchbook also supports dating the artist’s camp photograph to circa 1903–04. The autograph book contains a grouping of material from around 1902–04, including the camp photograph, reproductions of Mather’s artworks, sketches by Mather, and a beach scene by Dora Smith dated 1904. Traill’s sketchbook records that she undertook etching lessons with Mather in 1903.) ... "wherever Mr. Mather has pitched his artistic tent he has made himself thoroughly familiar with land and sea scape, and has reproduced these with fidelity to nature and the true artist's gift for seizing beautiful effects."

His students include:

- Jessie Traill (Note: Jessie Traill took lessons in etching from John Mather at his Austral Art School. In 1903 she kept a notebook of her lessons commenting on the etchings within it as they progress through various states. The notebook details her active engagement in the print making process and the tuition of John Mather. Together with jottings of sales, news clippings and a congratulatory letter from John Mather, her early success with the medium is documented. Jessie Traill's 1903 notebook reveals in intimate detail her lessons with John Mather. For example, the notes on an etching that Jessie Traill considered a failure: "Ground marked twice lines far too open & apart no mysterious depths drawing shaky, confused & altogether a failure, Mr Mather could not tell which way up." Mounted at 90 degrees from her notes and without visual cues, the correct orientation of the etching is difficult to determine. Later in the etching, Boat Builder's Shop, she includes some common place items in the foreground that leave no doubt as to the orientation of that etching. Boat Builder's Shop was exhibited in Melbourne, Adelaide and Launceston in 1905. The etching was praised in reviews and sold for 15/0. John Mather sent her a congratulatory letter which Jessie mounts in the notebook together with news clippings of the day.)
- Ida Rentoul Outhwaite
- Jessie Laver Evans
- Janet Cumbrae-Stewart
- M. J. MacNally
- Ellis Rowan
- Miss Robertson
- Lady Downer
- Margaret Forrest or Lady Forrest
- Lady Williams
- David Davies
- Alexander McClintock
- Polly Hurry
- Dora Wilson
- Janie Wilkinson Whyte
- James Fawcett of Fawcett and Ashworth
- Arthur Jerome Salmon

== Etchings ==
John Mather was among the earliest practitioners of etching in Victoria, producing his first known print, a portrait of Louis Abrahams, around 1886. The previous year John Mather, Tom Roberts and Louis Abrahams had begun teaching themselves etching techniques. (Note: In 1886 and 1887 Abrahams, Roberts and Robert F. Gow exhibited etchings with the Australian Artists’ Association. Abrahams’s 1886 “Etching after John Mather,” together with Mather’s c.1886 etched portrait of Abrahams, indicates their close association during this formative period.)

By the early 1890s Mather had produced a number of landscape etchings and was printing his own plates. (Note: An early landscape etching, Evening, Dandenong (1893), together with several of Mather’s other etchings, were observed to display the same sound drawing and tonal values as his paintings, with an increased sense of charm, particularly in simpler compositions. In 1894, he was noted as printing his own plates, regarded as a delicate and important process.) By 1894 he had imported a professional printing press and equipment from London, strengthening the technical foundations of etching practice in Melbourne. (Note: Later historical sources record that Mather imported a professional printing press and etching equipment from London for the production of his prints. The technical quality of works such as Brander’s Ferry, dated December 1894, indicates that the press was in operation by that time.)

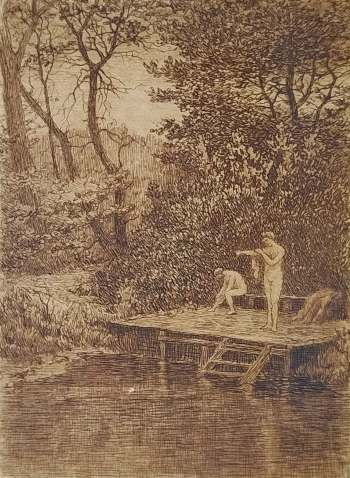
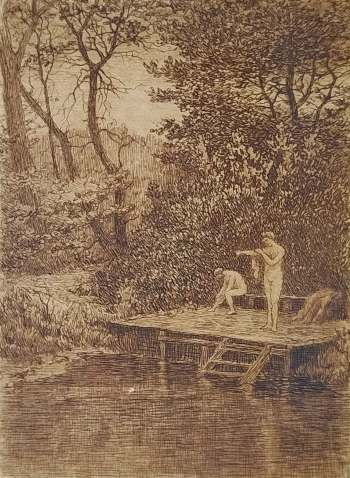
Bathing Place on the Watts 1895 John Mather (Note: Bathing Place on the Watts 1895 John Mather Bathing Place on the Watts depicts a popular swimming hole on the Watts River at Healesville that existed around 1895. By 1898 the swimming hole was in need of urgent repair. The local newspaper comments; some actions should be taken towards placing the old swimming hole in a more desirable state for the use of swimmers during the approaching hot months. …the inflow of silt has gradually accumulated, … the hole at the present time can be compared only to a large sand bank. A large tree has also fallen across the water and the planking erected at one time has been destroyed. … a good serviceable fence encloses this quarter … Of particular note is the reference to planking that has been erected. John Mather’s etching depicts a small jetty constructed of timber planks. The present day Watts River, in particular the form of the river banks and the vegetation, resemble that depicted in John Mather’s etching. There are also water holes still used for bathing as evidenced by towels hanging on trees, however not as inviting as that depicted by John Mather. This etching was also exhibited as The Bath, Healesville (1904), The Bath (1913) and The Bathers (1919). Later scholars have commented that his early etchings "show a poetic sensibility derived from the Barbizon School of etching. ‘The Bath, Healesville’ c.1895 with its synthesis of man and nature is one of his most appealing works." The plate mark of Bathing-place on the Watts is the same size as that of Brander’s Ferry dated 12.94, suggesting contemporary production. There are five known examples of the etching held in: • National Gallery of Australia • National Library of New Zealand • Art Gallery of New South Wales • Art Gallery of Ballarat • Private Collection, Melbourne, Australia)

Mather first exhibited an etching, Bathing-place on the Watts, at the Victorian Artists’ Society Annual Exhibition in September 1895, where it was noted as; "conspicuous as the only bit of nude work in the collection."

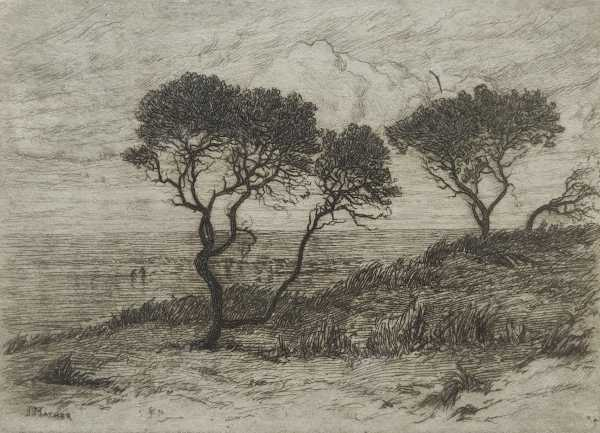
Ti-Tree 1898 John Mather

Alongside his figurative and landscape prints, Mather produced numerous etchings of windswept tea-trees along Brighton Beach, before shifting after 1900 toward larger architectural and urban compositions.

In the late 1890s he was the only artist in Australia formally teaching etching, and in 1900 he was described as a master of the medium. (Note: Contemporary art magazines commented that: Among professional artists there is only one etcher in Melbourne - Mr. Mather, the President of the Victorian Academy of Arts; but he has many pupils, and these, with amateurs and a large picture-public, have thronged the galleries daily; so that this pioneer undertaking will bear good fruit in taste, knowledge, and emulation.)

Mather was later associated with other notable etchers including John Shirlow, Victor Cobb and Lionel Lindsay. Shirlow was frequently described as the pioneer of Victorian etching, he himself disclaimed the title, pointing to the work of earlier practitioners including Mather.

Similarly Cobb stated, "John Mather ... commenced to etch in Victoria in the early eighties. To him, and no one else, belongs the credit as the first to pioneer of the art in Victoria. He imported an expensive press and equipment from London, conducted classes, and did much for the progress of the art, and was an enthusiastic exponent on the copper plate, up to the time of his death, a few years ago."

== Death ==
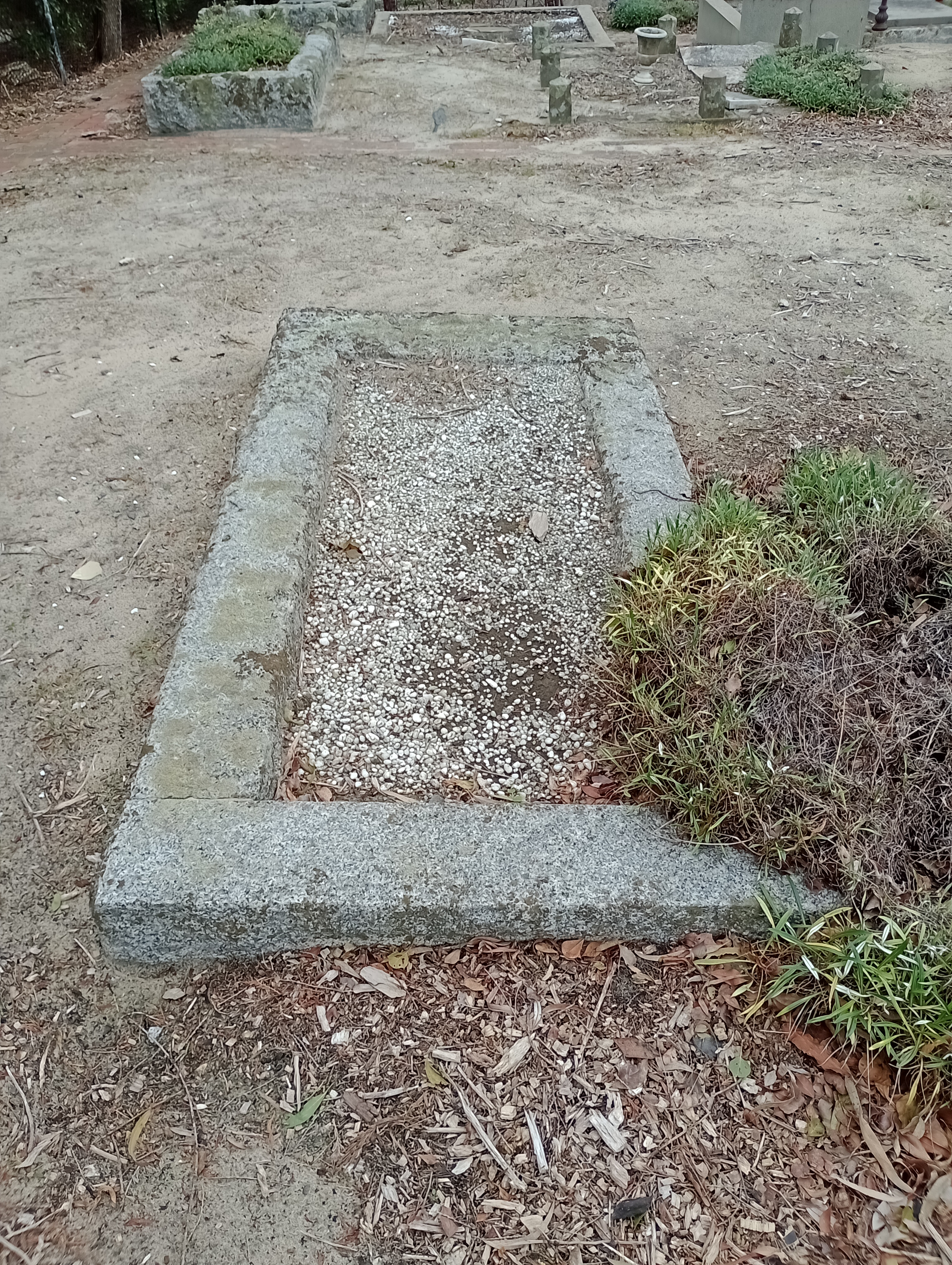
John Mather's grave with no memorial. In 2023 a small plaque was added with the words: Mr John Mather 1848 – 1916 The beauty of his Art endures.

John Mather died of diabetes at his home, Cadzow, South Yarra, Victoria on 18 February 1916; he was buried in the Cheltenham Pioneer Cemetery and lay in a grave with no memorial for more than 100 years.

Written just thirteen years after his death;

The war claimed his only son and his daughter who was well known in Melbourne music circles, lives now in the United States. It is as if "the place thereof knoweth him no more " But how can an artist ever be forgotten as long as human eyes are irresistibly drawn to the quiet beauty of his pictures on the wall?[365]

In July 2023 a small plaque was placed on the grave simply stating:

Mr John Mather 1848 – 1916 The beauty of his Art endures.

The words, his Art endures, refers to his painting and etching but also the art he nurtured as a mentor, teacher and one of the founding fathers of art in Victoria.

== The Mather collection ==
Following John Mather’s death, more than 130 works from his art collection were auctioned on 25 June 1919. Nearly 100 works of the 135 catalogued were sold, realising about £900.

Shortly after the auction, his widow Jessie Mather departed Melbourne for Europe, travelling via London and Nice before continuing to New York. While in Wakefield, Rhode Island, she became ill and died there in August 1920. Her 1920 will and probate indicate that she still retained almost £340 of furniture and paintings.

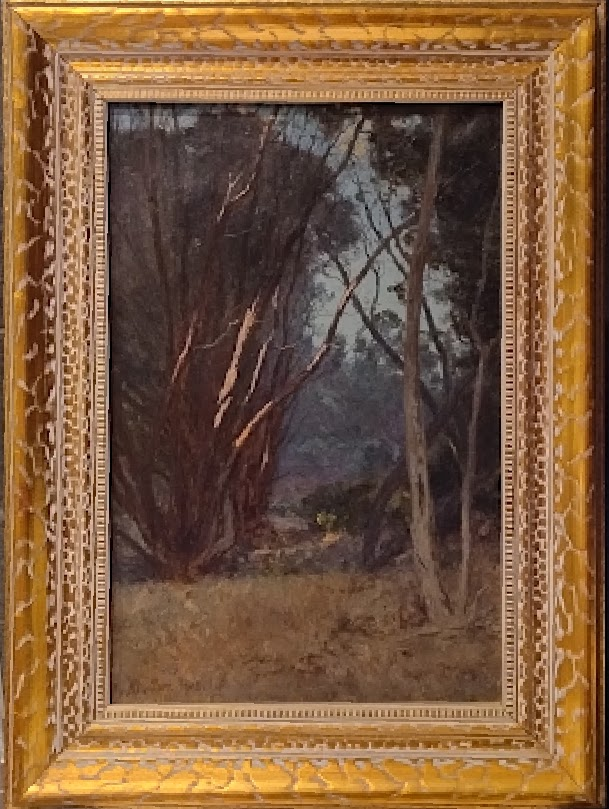
Late Afternoon (1906) by John Mather gifted to the Museum of Fine Arts, St. Petersburg, Florida in memory of Margaret Mather, the daughter of the artist, by her husband, George Bond

Works from Mather’s collection next reappeared in the 1960s. At that time, a large number of his works were in the possession of his daughter, Margaret Mather, who had emigrated to the United States in 1919 and ultimately settled in Florida in 1956. The collection contained more than 90 of her father's oils, watercolours, and etchings, including some of his most notable works.

Upon Margaret Mather's death in February 1960, her collection passed to her widower, George Bond. In 1967, Bond donated 27 works by Mather to the Museum of Fine Arts, St. Petersburg, Florida, in Margaret Mather's memory. These works were subsequently exhibited in June 1967. One work nominally titled Late Afternoon was later deaccessioned and is now in a private collection. In 2023, twenty-six oils and watercolours by Mather remained in the museum’s collection.

Following George Bond’s death in 1971, the remaining Mather collection formed part of his estate, and the executors offered it for sale to a friend and associate of George Bond residing in Florida. Over subsequent decades he made proposals to repatriate and exhibit the Mather collection in Australia, including the works held by the Museum of Fine Arts, St. Petersburg, and some later additions. These efforts were ultimately unsuccessful. Following the death of the collection's last owner, the collection was auctioned and sold.

The Mather collection, together with additional works, was auctioned during 2021–23 in Florida. The paintings and etchings were dispersed throughout the United States, although some were returned to Australia by collectors. Several works returned to Melbourne, among them a large watercolour Brighton Beach (1896), which was acquired by a Melbourne-based collector and subsequently entered the collection of the Bayside City Council Gallery.

== Legacy ==
In 1932, Mather was described as "a landscape painter of considerable reputation during his lifetime". He is regarded as a significant figure in the development of Australian plein air painting. Although widely respected during his lifetime, 13 years after his death his name had largely faded from memory, while his paintings continued to be held in public and private collections.

In 1919, several personal events affected his family. The death of his youngest son, the emigration of his daughter and grandson to the United States, and the illness and later death of his wife overseas meant that by 1920, apart from a son affected by mental illness, none of his immediate family remained in Melbourne. His extensive art collection was subsequently auctioned on 25 June 1919.

Morning San Remo 1900, a locality also painted in the watercolour Passing Showers 1902 in the collection of the Geelong Art Gallery. (Note: Morning San Remo is an oil painting on canvas signed and dated J.Mather.1.1900. The reverse of the frame has a label San Remo. The Thallon picture frame with characteristic laurel and berry motif and a W & G. Dean label, is likely the original exhibition frame. The view is recognisable as looking east from San Remo Beach towards the Strzelecki Ranges. In recent years the painting has been auctioned under the nominal title ‘Lake Scene’, however the view is clearly of a tidal water body and not a lake. The painting was exhibited as Lot 58 Morning San Remo J. Mather £21 0 0 in the Victorian Artists Society Annual Exhibition November 1900. Contemporary newspaper articles describe the painting: "The principal work shown by the President, Mr John Mather, is Morning, San Remo, an oil colour, different in choice of subject and treatment from his usual work. The morning mist rising from the sea is well rendered, a fishing boat is seen pushing off for the day’s work."; "Morning at San Remo, by Mr Mather, is a good realisation of the delicate luminous grey of early morning. The tranquil waters of the inlet reflect the clouds and light overhead, and the suggestion of the atmosphere which seems to rise like the faintest of veils from the surface of the water, is charming."; "The effect of the pearly grey softness of his “Morning at San Remo” is spoilt by the treatment of the rocky foreground."; "There is not nearly so much in the way of landscapes to be seen this time, and of seascapes there are but few, but there is one by J. Mather of " Morning, San Remo," which makes one feel in love with the time, the place, the artist and all, it is so dreamily fresh and fair."; Similar scenes, with a lower tide, are illustrated in a water colour signed by John Mather and dated 1902 in the collection of the Geelong Gallery titled Passing Showers. and in an unsigned oil on board attributed to John Mather nominally titled ‘Rowboat on Shore’, with Badger and Fox Gallery, Sydney.) " ... is a good realisation of the delicate luminous grey of early morning. The tranquil waters of the inlet reflect the clouds and light overhead, ... the atmosphere which seems to rise like the faintest of veils from the surface of the water, is charming."

In the following decades, leading Australian art magazines of the early 20th century made no reference to Mather's work. Critics, historians, and curators focused narrowly on a few selected artists and images of Australian impressionism. The work of art historians of the 1930s, later transcribed in subsequent art histories, provided little information about his activities. Other than occasional individual works loaned or sold by private owners, there were few significant exhibitions of his work.

Similarly, many of the titles of his works have been forgotten, with nominal or generic titles sometimes applied at art auctions. Nevertheless, because Mather accurately depicted the scenes he observed, it is often possible to identify the locations and titles of his paintings using various historical sources.

More recently, art historians, researchers, and exhibitions are progressively broadening the understanding of the development of Australian art, highlighting the contributions of a wider range of artists and their work.

Mather's art, widely appreciated during his lifetime but largely unacknowledged in the decades following his death, has since been rediscovered.

== Collections ==
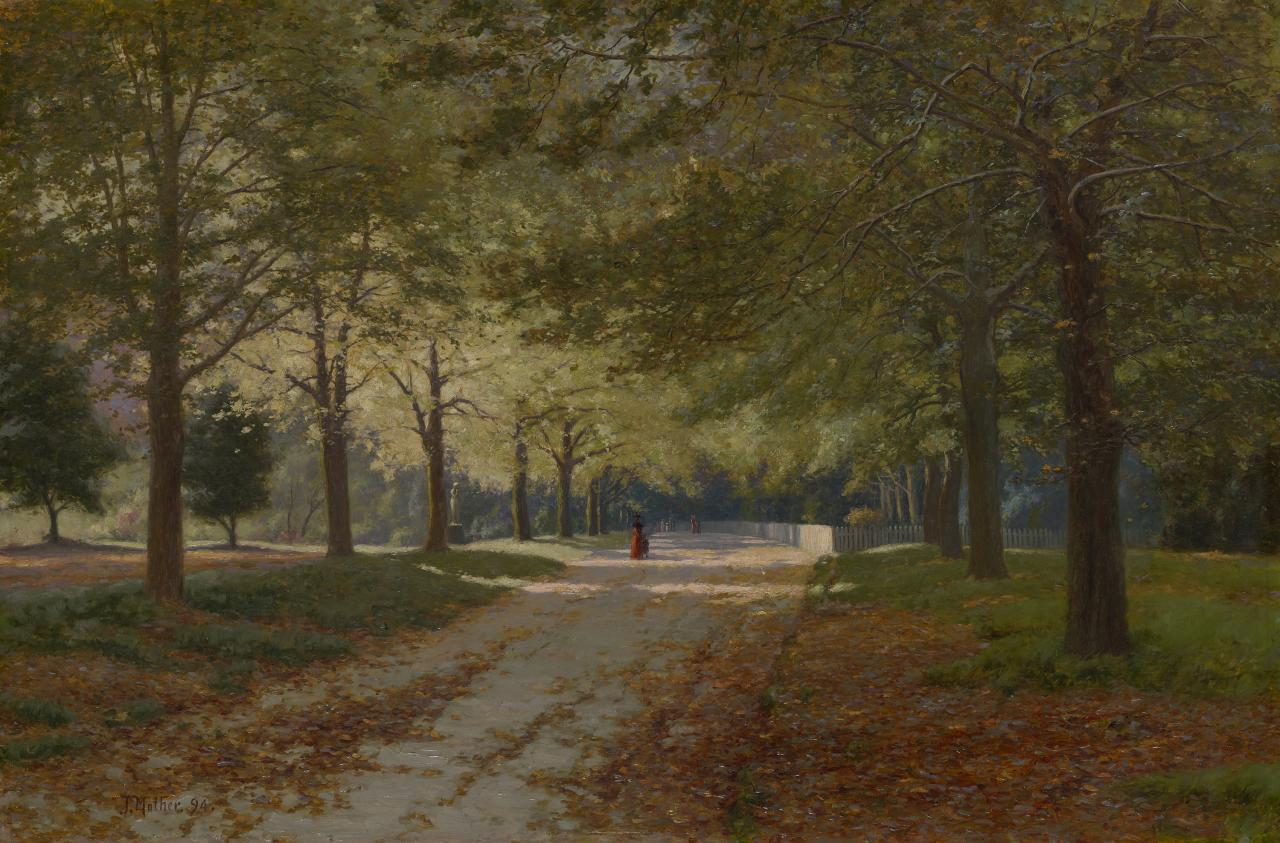
John Mather, Autumn in the Fitzroy Gardens, 1894 in the collection of the National Gallery of Victoria

Three of Mather's own paintings, Autumn in the Fitzroy Gardens in oil, and Morning, Lake Omeo and Wintry Weather, Yarra Glen, both watercolours, were purchased by the National Gallery of Victoria. His work is represented in the collections of the:

- National Gallery of Australia (29 works)
- National Library of New Zealand (7 works)
- National Gallery of Victoria (11 works)
- Art Gallery of New South Wales (8 works)
- Art Gallery of Western Australia (3 works)
- Tasmanian Museum and Art Gallery (1 work)
- Queensland Art Gallery (1 work)
- State Library of Victoria (5 works)
- Geelong Art Gallery (8 works)
- Ballarat Art Gallery (12 works)
- Bendigo Art Gallery (2 works)
- Castlemaine Art Museum (6 works)
- Benalla Art Gallery (1 work)
- Launceston Art Gallery
- Newcastle Art Gallery (3 works)
- Gippsland Art Gallery (2 works)
- Latrobe Regional Gallery (4 works)
- New England Regional Art Museum (2 works)
- Mornington Peninsula Regional Gallery
- Melbourne City Council, City Collection (1 work)
- Bayside Gallery, Bayside City Council (1 work)
- Victorian Artists Society Collection (1 work)
- Museum of Fine Arts, St. Petersburg, Florida (26 works)

== Notes and references ==
Notes
