= Rivers Thompson =

Sir Rivers Thompson KCSI CIE
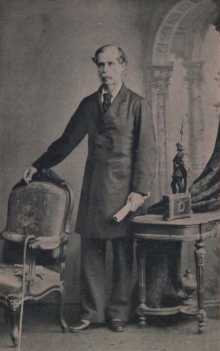

Chief Commissioner of Burma
- In office 14 April 1875 – 30 March 1878
- Preceded by: Ashley Eden
- Succeeded by: Charles Umpherston Aitchison

Lieutenant Governor of Bengal
- In office 1882–1887
- Preceded by: Ashley Eden
- Succeeded by: Steuart Colvin Bayley

Personal details
- Born: Augustus Rivers Thompson; 12 September 1829
- Died: 27 November 1890 (aged 61) Gibraltar
- Occupation: Administrator

Sir Augustus Rivers Thompson KCSI CIE (12 September 1829 – 27 November 1890) was a British colonial administrator who served as Chief Commissioner of the British Crown Colony of Burma from April 1875 to March 1878. He was Lieutenant-Governor of Bengal between 1882 and 1887.

Thompson was appointed a CSI in 1877, a CIE in 1883 and knighted with the KCSI in 1885.

He was president of the executive committee of the Calcutta International Exhibition (1883-1884). He established the R.T. Girls' High School in Suri, Birbhum.

He died of pneumonia in Gibraltar.

Government offices
Preceded by Ashley Eden	Chief Commissioner of British Crown Colony of Burma; 1875–1878	Succeeded by Charles Umpherston Aitchinson
Preceded by Sir Ashley Eden	Lieutenant-governor of Bengal; 1882–1887	Succeeded by Sir Steuart Colvin Bayley
