= Calcutta International Exhibition =

1883–1884 world's fair

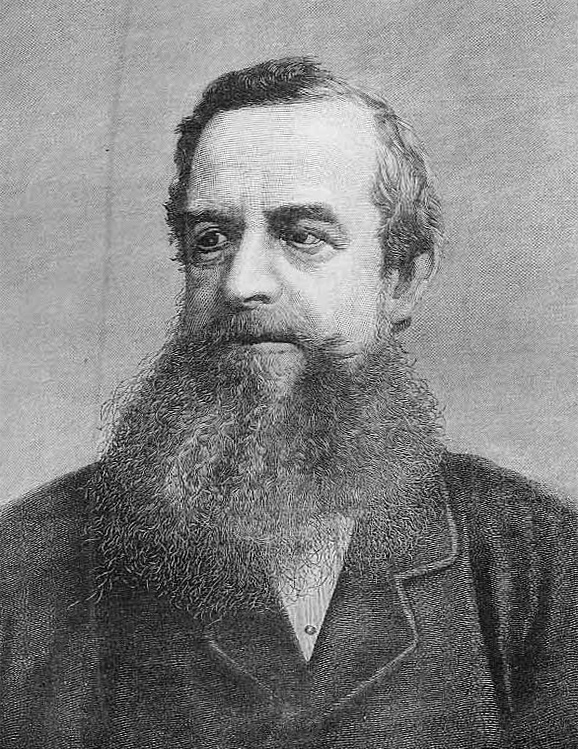
- Lord Ripon (who gave the opening address) in 1880

Overview
- BIE-class: Unrecognized exposition
- Name: Calcutta International Exhibition
- Area: 22 acres (8.9 ha)
- Visitors: 1,000,000 (paid = 817,153)
- Organized by: Augustus Rivers Thompson (president executive committee), S.T.Trevor (vice president) and Jules Joubert (general manager).

Participant(s)
- Countries: 37

Location
- Country: British India
- City: Calcutta
- Venue: Grounds of the Indian Museum and the Maidan
- Coordinates: 22°33′29″N 88°21′03″E

Timeline
- Opening: 4 December 1883
- Closure: 10 March 1884

The Calcutta International Exhibition world's fair was held in Calcutta (now Kolkata) from December 1883 to March 1884.

== Summary ==
The fair was held between 4 December 1883 and 10 March 1884. and took place in the grounds of the Indian Museum and the Maidan.

There were contributions from Belgium, Ceylon, France, Germany, Italy, Japan, Straits, Turkey and U.S.A. The Australian colonies of New South Wales, South Australia, Tasmania and Victoria were all hosted on the Indian Museum side of the fair.

The Maidan side of the fair was connected to the Indian Museum by a bridge across the Chowinghee Road (now Jawaharlal Nehru Road). In the Maidan there was an iron building that contained Indian courts, a machinery annex, a military shed and a refreshments room.

=== Indian Courts ===
There was a Punjab Court with contents secured by Lockwood Kipling.

The Maharajah of Scindia provided a carved sandstone gateway, the Gwalior Gateway, designed by Major James Blaikie Keith. After the exhibition the gateway was sent in 200 packages to London's Victoria and Albert Museum and then displayed at the Colonial and Indian Exhibition in 1886.

== Officials ==
The fair officials included Augustus Rivers Thompson (president executive committee), S.T.Trevor (vice president of the committee) and Jules Joubert (general manager).

William Trickett was commissioner for New South Wales.

== Opening ceremony ==
The opening talk was by Lord Ripon and was attended by Governors of Bengal (also president of organising committee), Madras, and Bombay, several maharajas and the Duke and Duchess of Connaught.

The ceremony was boycotted by the Anglo-Indian community in protest at the recently introduced Ilbert Bill, it rained (unusual at that time of year) and the illuminations failed.

== See also ==
- Colonial Exhibition of Semarang
