= Steuart Bayley =

Lieutenant-Governor of Bengal from 1887 to 1890

Sir Steuart Bayley GCSI, CIE
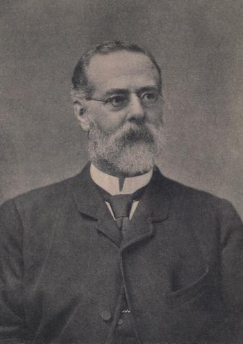

Lieutenant-Governor of Bengal
- In office 1887–1890
- Preceded by: Sir Rivers Thompson
- Succeeded by: Sir Charles Elliott

Personal details
- Relations: William Butterworth Bayley (father)

Sir Steuart Colvin Bayley, GCSI, CIE (26 November 1836 – 3 June 1925) was a British civil servant and Lieutenant-Governor of Bengal from 1887 to 1890.

== Early life ==
He was the son of William Butterworth Bayley, who rose to be acting Governor-General of India, and Anne Augusta Jackson. His middle name is a reference to the well-connected Colvin family of Anglo-Indian administrators, just as John Russell Colvin named his son after his boss, George Eden, 1st Earl of Auckland. He was educated at Eton and Haileybury College.

== Career ==
Bayley entered the Bengal Civil Service in 1856. He held the office of Commissioner of the Patna Division in 1873. He was invested Knight Commander of the Order of the Star of India (KCSI) in 1878. He held the office of Chief Commissioner of Assam in 1878. He held the office of Resident at Hyderabad in 1881. He held the office of Member of the Governor-General's Council in 1882. Bayley held the office of Lieutenant-Governor of Bengal between 1887 and 1890. He was Secretary of the Political and Secret Department, India Office in 1891. In 1888, he accompanied the Sikkim expedition and was awarded the India General Service Medal (1854–95) with clasp for 'Sikkim 1888'.

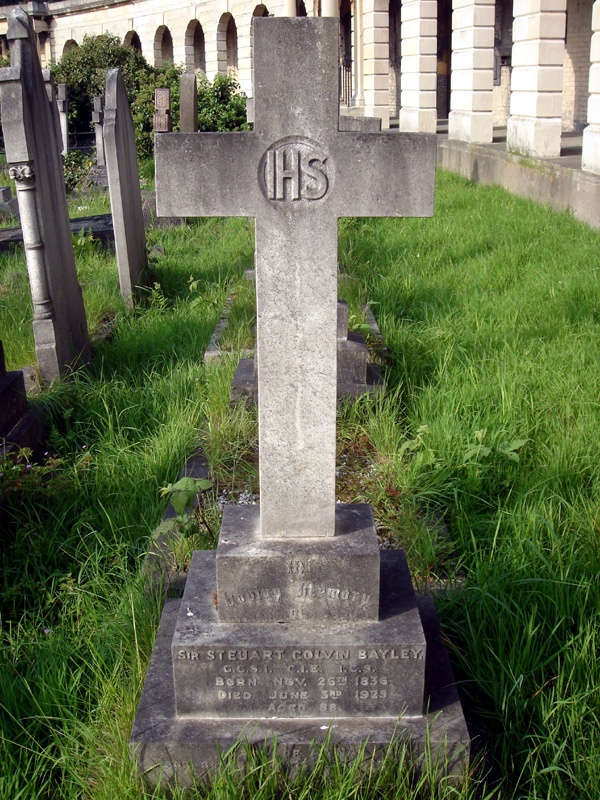
Funerary monument, Brompton Cemetery, London

== Personal life ==
Bayley married Anna Farquharson, daughter of Robert Nesham Farquharson, on 21 November 1860 at Patna, India. They had 13 children.

== Later life ==
Bayley died in 1925 and was interred in Brompton Cemetery, London. His portrait is held by the National Portrait Gallery.

== Notes ==
Government offices
Preceded by Sir Augustus Rivers Thompson	Lieutenant-governor of Bengal; 1887–1890	Succeeded by Sir Charles Alfred Elliott
