= William Acland Douglas Anderson =

Australian politician

William Acland Douglas Anderson, CMG (31 October 1829 – 23 January 1882) was an English-born politician and goldfields commissioner in colonial Victoria, Australia.

== Biography ==
Anderson was born in Blackburn, Lancashire, England, the son of Lieut.-Colonel Joseph Anderson C.B., K.H. and his wife Mary, née Campbell. Early in life he came out with his father to Sydney and received a portion of his education there.

In April 1846 Anderson joined his father in the 50th (Queen's Own) Regiment of Foot in India as an ensign and was promoted to lieutenant on 26 August 1848. In June 1852 he transferred to the 65th (2nd Yorkshire, North Riding) Regiment of Foot (then based in New Zealand) and was promoted to the rank of captain. Anderson then took leave to Victoria, where his parents were located. From 12 July 1853 to April 1855 he was appointed a Commissioner of Goldfields in Victoria. He sold his army commission in March 1854. For a year from May 1856 he was a commissioner for Melbourne's sewers and water supply. From November 1856 to November 1858 Anderson was member for Evelyn and Mornington in the Victorian Legislative Assembly. He was regarded as a moderate and supported the William Haines ministries.

Anderson was the real founder of volunteer forces of Victoria for in 1855 he raised a rifle corps in Melbourne, which was not only the first in Victoria, but probably the first in Australia. Anderson was appointed Lieutenant-Colonel commanding the 1st Melbourne Rifles. On 21 March 1862, when Colonel Pitt was called to the New Zealand War, Lieutenant Colonel Anderson was elevated to the position of colonel-commandant of all the Victorian volunteer force, including the administration of the naval branch.

Anderson attended the commission on colonial defences which met in Sydney in 1881. Anderson died on 23 January 1882 at his home in South Yarra. Anderson had married Caroline née Davidson on 1 May 1856. They had four children: daughters Mary and Fairlie, and sons Acland Alfred Gordon and Douglas.
