= List of heads of state of Myanmar =

The list of heads of state of Myanmar comprises all heads of state of the various political entities which have held swaths of territory in what is now Myanmar (Burma) since 1752. Included are relevant colonial and military officials.

== Konbaung (1752–1885) ==
Name	Image	Reign From	Reign Until	Relationship with predecessor(s)
Alaungpaya		29 February 1752	11 May 1760	Founder
Naungdawgyi		11 May 1760	28 November 1763	Eldest Son of Alaungpaya
Hsinbyushin		28 November 1763	10 June 1776	Brother of Naungdawgyi and Second eldest son of Alaungpaya
Singu		10 June 1776	6 February 1782	Son of Hsinbyushin
Phaungka		6 February 1782	11 February 1782	Son of Naungdawgyi and cousin brother of Singu
Bodawpaya		11 February 1782	5 June 1819	Uncle; Alaungpaya's fourth son
Bagyidaw		5 June 1819	15 April 1837	Grandson of Bodawpaya
Tharrawaddy		15 April 1837	17 November 1846	Brother of Bagyidaw and grandson of Bodawpaya
Pagan		17 November 1846	18 February 1853	Son of Tharrawaddy Min
Mindon		18 February 1853	1 October 1878	Half Brother of Pagan Min (son of Tharrawaddy Min)
Thibaw		1 October 1878	29 November 1885	Son of Mindon Min

== British rule in Burma ==
Portrait	Name	Consort	Lifespan	Reign	Imperial Durbar	House
	Victoria	None	24 May 1819 – 22 January 1901	1 May 1876 – 22 January 1901	1 January 1877 (represented by Lord Lytton)	House of Hanover
	Edward VII	Alexandra of Denmark	9 November 1841 – 6 May 1910	22 January 1901 – 6 May 1910	1 January 1903 (represented by Lord Curzon of Kedleston)	House of Saxe-Coburg and Gotha
	George V	Mary of Teck	3 June 1865 – 20 January 1936	6 May 1910 – 20 January 1936	12 December 1911	House of Saxe-Coburg and Gotha (1910–1917); House of Windsor (1917–1936)
	Edward VIII	None	23 June 1894 – 28 May 1972	20 January 1936 – 11 December 1936	None (Note: Edward VIII abdicated after less than one year of reign.)	House of Windsor
	George VI	Elizabeth Bowes-Lyon	14 December 1895 – 6 February 1952	11 December 1936 – 22 June 1948	None (Note: A durbar was deemed expensive and impractical due to poverty and demands for independence.)	House of Windsor

=== Commissioners and Governors ===
(Dates in italics indicate de facto continuation of office)

N	Portrait	Name Title office	Term of office		Notes
N	Portrait	Name Title office	Took office	Left office	Notes
British Burma
1		Arthur Purves Phayre, Chief Commissioner	31 January 1862	16 February 1867	Arakan, Tenasserim, and Pegu are united as British ("Lower") Burma (within British India)
2		Albert Fytche, Chief Commissioner	16 February 1867	18 April 1871	
3		Ashley Eden, Chief Commissioner	18 April 1871	14 April 1875	
4		Augustus Rivers Thompson, Chief Commissioner	14 April 1875	30 March 1878	Acting until 30 April 1877
5		Charles Umpherston Aitchison, Chief Commissioner	30 March 1878	2 July 1880	
6		Charles Bernard, Chief Commissioner	2 July 1880	2 March 1883	Acting until 4 April 1882, 1st time
7		Sir Charles Haukes Todd Crosthwaite, Chief Commissioner	2 March 1883	25 September 1886	Acting until 28 February 1884, 1st time. On 1 January 1886, as a result of the Third Anglo-Burmese War, remnant of Kingdom of Awa ("Upper Burma") annexed to British Burma (within British India). On 26 February 1886, Upper and Lower Burma united as Burma (within British India)
8		Charles Edward Bernard, Chief Commissioner	25 September 1886	12 March 1887	2nd time
9		Sir Charles Haukes Todd Crosthwaite, Chief Commissioner	12 March 1887	10 December 1890	2nd time
10		Alexander Mackenzie, Chief Commissioner	10 December 1890	3 April 1895	
11		Frederick William Richards Fryer, Chief Commissioner	3 April 1895	1 May 1897	
12		Frederick William Richards Fryer, Lieutenant Governor	1 May 1897	4 April 1903	
13		Sir Hugh Shakespear Barnes, Lieutenant Governor	4 April 1903	9 May 1905	
14		Sir Herbert Thirkell White, Lieutenant Governor	9 May 1905	19 May 1910	
15		Sir Harvey Adamson, Lieutenant Governor	19 May 1910	28 October 1915	
–		Sir George Shaw, acting Lieutenant Governor	15 May 1913	1 November 1913	Acting for Adamson
16		Sir Spencer Harcourt Butler, Lieutenant Governor	28 October 1915	22 September 1917	1st time
17		Walter Francis Rice, acting Lieutenant Governor	22 September 1917	15 February 1918	
18		Sir Reginald Henry Craddock, Lieutenant Governor	15 February 1918	21 December 1922	
19		Sir Spencer Harcourt Butler, Lieutenant Governor	21 December 1922	2 January 1923	2nd time
20		Sir Spencer Harcourt Butler, Governor	2 January 1923	20 December 1927	
21		Sir Charles Alexander Innes, Governor	20 December 1927	20 December 1932	
22		Sir Hugh Landsdowne Stephenson, Governor	20 December 1932	8 May 1936	
23		Sir Archibald Douglas Cochrane, Governor	8 May 1936	6 May 1941	On 1 April 1937, Burma separated from British India, as for provided for in the Government of India Act 1935
24		Sir Reginald Hugh Dorman-Smith, Governor	6 May 1941	31 August 1946	From May 1942 until October 1945 in exile at Shimla, British India
Japanese Occupation of British Burma
25		Shōjirō Iida, Military commander	20 April 1942	18 March 1943	Commander of the 15th Army
26		Masakazu Kawabe, Military commander	18 March 1943	30 August 1944	Commander of the Japanese Burma Area Army
27		Heitarō Kimura, Military Commander	30 August 1944	15 August 1945	Commander of the Japanese Burma Area Army
Allied military administration
28		Actg. Admiral Lord Louis Mountbatten, Military Governor	1 January 1944	October 1945	Supreme Allied Commander, South East Asia Command
29		Major general Sir Hubert Elvin Rance, Military governor	October 1945	31 August 1946	
British Burma
30		Sir Hubert Elvin Rance, Governor	31 August 1946	4 January 1948	
Since 4 January 1948 Burma gains independence as Union of Burma, as provided for in the Burma Independence Act 1947 and the Burmese Declaration of Independence

== Japanese occupation of Burma ==
Portrait	Regnal Name	Personal Name	Reign	Notes
	Hirohito	Emperor Shōwa	1942 – 1945	

=== Japanese Superintendents (1942–1945) ===
N	Name (Birth–Death)	Term of office	
N	Name (Birth–Death)	Took office	Left office
1	Yoshio Nasu (1897 —1993)	1942	24 July 1942
2	Haruki Isayama (1894 —1990)	26 July 1942	1942
3	Eitarō Naka (1893 —1969)	19 August 1942	18 September 1943
4	Gōtarō Ogawa (1876 —1945)	1943	1945

=== Saharat Thai Doem Authorities ===
==== Thai Military governor in Kengtung and Möngpan ====
- Dec 1942–1945 Phin Choonhavan (b. 1891 - d. 1973)

== Chairmen of the Burma (1937–1948) ==
N	Portrait	Name (Birth–Death)	Term of office	
N	Portrait	Name (Birth–Death)	Took office	Left office
1		Ba Maw	1937	1939
2		Maung Pu	1939	1940
3		U Saw	1940	1942
4		Aung San	1943	1943
5		Ba Maw	1943	1945
6		Sir Paw Tun	1945	1945
7		Tun Oke	1945	1946
8		Sir Paw Tun	1946	1947
9		Aung San	1947	1948
10		U Nu	1948	1948

== Presidents of Burma/Myanmar (1948–present) ==
(Dates in italics indicate de facto continuation of office)

=== Union of Burma (1948–1974) ===
No.	Name (Birth–Death)	Portrait	Took office	Left office	Time in office	Political Party
Presidents of the Union
1	Sao Shwe Thaik (1895–1962)		4 January 1948	16 March 1952	4 years, 72 days	Anti-Fascist People's Freedom League
2	Ba U (1887–1963)		16 March 1952	13 March 1957	4 years, 362 days	Anti-Fascist People's Freedom League
3	Win Maung (1916–1989)		13 March 1957	2 March 1962	4 years, 354 days	Anti-Fascist People's Freedom League
Chairman of the Revolutionary Council of the Union of Burma
—	Ne Win (1911–2002)		2 March 1962	2 March 1974	12 years, 0 days	Military / Burma Socialist Programme Party
=== Socialist Republic of the Union of Burma (1974–1988) ===
Chairman of the Council of State, Presidents of the Republic
4	Ne Win (1911–2002)		2 March 1974	9 November 1981	7 years, 252 days	Burma Socialist Programme Party
5	San Yu (1918–1996)		9 November 1981	27 July 1988	6 years, 261 days	Burma Socialist Programme Party
6	Sein Lwin (1923–2004)		27 July 1988	12 August 1988	16 days	Burma Socialist Programme Party
—	Aye Ko (1921–2006); Acting President		12 August 1988	19 August 1988	7 days	Burma Socialist Programme Party
7	Maung Maung (1925–1994)		19 August 1988	18 September 1988	30 days	Burma Socialist Programme Party
=== Union of Burma/Myanmar (1988–2011) ===
Chairmen of the State Law and Order Restoration Council
—	Saw Maung (1928–1997)		18 September 1988	23 April 1992	3 years, 218 days	Military
—	Than Shwe (1933–)		23 April 1992	15 November 1997	5 years, 206 days	Military
—	Chairman of the State Peace and Development Council					
—	Than Shwe (1933–)		15 November 1997	30 March 2011	13 years, 135 days	Military
=== Republic of the Union of Myanmar (2011–present) ===
Presidents of the Republic
8	Thein Sein (1945–)		30 March 2011	30 March 2016	5 years, 0 days	Union Solidarity and Development Party
9	Htin Kyaw (1946–)		30 March 2016	21 March 2018	1 year, 356 days	National League for Democracy
—	Myint Swe (1951–2025); Acting President		21 March 2018	30 March 2018	9 days	Union Solidarity and Development Party
10	Win Myint (1951–)		30 March 2018	1 February 2021	2 years, 308 days	National League for Democracy
—	Myint Swe (1951–2025); Acting President		1 February 2021	7 August 2025	4 years, 187 days	Union Solidarity and Development Party
—	Min Aung Hlaing (1956–); Acting President On Duty on NDSC for Myint Swe		22 July 2024	10 April 2026	1 year, 262 days	Military
11	Min Aung Hlaing (1956–)		10 April 2026	Incumbent	39 days	Independent

== Chairmen of the Burma Socialist Programme Party (1962–1988) ==
No.	Name (Birth–Death)	Portrait	Took office	Left office	Time in office	Notes
1	Ne Win (1911–2002)		4 July 1962	23 July 1988	26 years, 19 days	Also Chairman of the Union Revolutionary Council (1962–1974), Prime Minister (1962–1974) and President (1974–1981).
2	Sein Lwin (1923–2004)		26 July 1988	12 August 1988	17 days	Also President (1988).
3	Maung Maung (1925–1994)		19 August 1988	18 September 1988	30 days	Also President (1988).

== See also ==
- Myanmar
  - Politics of Myanmar
  - List of Burmese monarchs
  - List of colonial governors of Burma
  - List of heads of state of Myanmar since 1948
  - President of Myanmar
  - Vice President of Myanmar
  - Prime Minister of Myanmar
  - State Counsellor of Myanmar
- Lists of Incumbents
