= Edward Spence Symes =

British colonial administrator(1852–1901)

Sir Edward Spence Symes KCIE CIE
- Born: 16 August 1852; London
- Died: 10 January 1901 (aged 48)
- Education: University College London
- Occupation: Colonial administrator

Sir Edward Spence Symes (16 August 1852 – 10 January 1901) was a British colonial administrator who was Chief Secretary to the Government of British Burma from 1897 to 1901, and played a prominent part in the annexation and pacification of Upper Burma.

== Early life and education ==
Symes was born on 16 August 1852 in London, the third son of E. S. Symes MD. He was educated at University College London.

== Career ==
Symes entered the Indian Civil Service in 1873 after competitive examination. He was sent to Burma where he was attached to the headquarters of Sir Ashley Eden, Chief Commissioner of Burma where he rose to rank of Secretary to the Chief Commissioner in 1886. From 1888 to 1890, when his experience and seniority was required, he served as Commissioner of the Central, Eastern, and Southern Divisions of Upper Burma after the annexation following the Anglo-Burmese War of 1885. In 1897, he was appointed Chief Secretary to the government of Burma and remained in office until his death in 1901.

Symes, described as "practically the one permanent element of the Government of Burma in the Rangoon secretariat", and "a household word" in the Burma service, served as chief adviser to Sir Charles Bernard; Sir Charles Crosthwaite; Sir Alexander Mackenzie, and Sir Frederick Fryer.

== Death ==
On 8 January 1901, Symes shot himself with a revolver while on the way to his office in Rangoon in a hired carriage. He had been suffering from severe nervous and physical breakdown. The shot passed through his palate into his head but he survived, and the driver took him to hospital but he died two days later on 10 January 1901.

== Honours ==
Symes was appointed Companion of the Order of the Indian Empire (CIE) in the 1886 Birthday Honours. He was promoted to Knight Commander of the Order of the Indian Empire (KCIE) in the 1900 New Year Honours.
