= 1886 Birthday Honours =

Granted in celebration of the 24 May birthday of Queen Victoria

The Queen's Birthday Honours 1886 were granted in celebration of the 24 May birthday of Queen Victoria. They were announced in the London Gazette of 28 May 1886.

Recipients of honours are shown below as they were styled in the Gazette, before their new honours or any subsequent honours. Various archaisms are preserved, e.g. spellings such as "Burmah", now spelt Burma (or called Myanmar), etc.; abbreviations such as "Knt." for Knight [Bachelor], etc.; and sequence of post-nominal letters, such as "K.C.B., V.C." whereas V.C. is now placed before other post-nominals.

== The Most Honourable Order of the Bath ==
=== Knight Grand Cross of the Order of the Bath (GCB) ===
- Admiral Lord Clarence Edward Paget, P.C., K.C.B.
- General Viscount Templetown, K.C.B.
- General Sir William Jones, K C.B.
- General Sir Charles Reid, K.C.B., Bengal Staff Corps.
- General Sir George Malcolm, K.C.B., Bombay Staff Corps.
- General Sir Daniel Lysons, K.C.B.
- Lieutenant-General and Honorary General Sir Frederick Francis Maude, K.C.B., V.C.

=== Knight Commander of the Order of the Bath (KCB) ===
- General Frank Turner, C.B., Royal Artillery.
- Admiral Arthur Farquhar, Royal Navy.
- General Henry James Warre, C.B.
- Lieutenant-General and Honorary General the Honourable St George Gerald Foley, C.B.
- Lieutenant-General and Honorary General Henry Errington Longden, C.B., C.S.I.
- General William Olpherts, C.B., V.C., Royal (Bengal) Artillery.
- Admiral John Corbett, C.B., Royal Navy.
- Vice-Admiral Sir George Henry Richards, Knt., C.B., Royal Navy.
- Lieutenant-General Julius Richard Glyn, C.B.
- Lieutenaut-General William Pollexfen Radcliffe, C.B.
- Lieutenant-General William Payn, C.B.
- Major-General John Watson, C.B., V.C., Bombay Staff Corps.
- Henry Robinson, Esq., C.B., vice-president of the Local Government Board, Ireland.

=== Companion of the Order of the Bath (CB) ===
- Major-General George Samuel Young, Commanding Troops, Dublin District.
- Major-General Stephen Henry Edward Chamier, Royal Artillery.
- Captain Frederick George Denham Bedford, Royal Navy.
- Lieutenant-Colonel and Colonel Gordon Douglas Pritchard, Royal Engineers.
- Lieutenant-Colonel and Colonel William Wiltshire Lynch, half-pay, Assistant Adjutant and Quartermaster-General, Aldershot.
- Captain Robert Woodward, Royal Navy.
- Lieutenant-Colonel and Colonel William Dunn Bond, half-pay, Colonel on the Staff, Natal.
- Lieutenant-Colonel and Colonel Robert Montresor Rogers, V.C., half-pay, Brigadier-General, Bengal.
- Colonel Adam George Forbes Hogg, Bombay Staff Corps.
- Lieutenant-Colonel and Colonel Aylmer Spicer Cameron, V.C., half-pay, Commandant and Secretary, Royal Military College.
- Lieutenant-Colonel and Colonel George Frederick Gildea, half-pay.
- Deputy Surgeon-General John By Cole Reade, Medical Staff.
- Lieutenant-Colonel and Colonel William de Wilton Roche Thackwell, Regimental District.
- Colonel Alfred Robert Davidson Mackenzie, Bengal Cavalry.
- Lieutenant-Colonel and Colonel Edward Hopton, Regimental District.
- Lieutenant-Colonel and Colonel Charles Henry Browne, Regimental District.
- Colonel Edward Talbot Thackeray, V.C., Royal Engineers.
- Lieutenant-Colonel and Colonel Sir John William Campbell, Bart., Royal Artillery.
- Deputy Commissary-General (with honorary and relative rank of Colonel) John Leslie Robertson, Commissariat and Transport Staff.
- Lieutenant-Colonel Wardlaw Cortlandt Anderson, Bengal Staff Corps.
- Brigade Surgeon George Farrell, Bengal Medical Establishment.
- William Orange, Esq., M.D., Superintendent of Broadmoor Criminal Lunatic Asylum.
- Charles Stuart Scott, Esq., Secretary of Embassy, Berlin.
- Patrick Cumin, Esq., Secretary to the Committee of Council on Education.

== Order of the Star of India ==
=== Knight Commander of the Order of the Star of India (KCSI) ===
- Theodore Cracraft Hope, Esq., C.S.I., C.I.E., Bombay Civil Service, Member of the Council of the Governor-General of India.
- Charles Edward Bernard, Esq., C.S.I., Bengal Civil Service, Chief Commissioner of Burmah.
- Nawab Khwaja Abdul Ghani Meeah, of Dacca, C.S.I.
- William Chichele Plowden, Esq., Bengal Civil Service (Retired), late Census Commissioner for India.

=== Companion of the Order of the Star of India (CSI) ===
- William George Pedder, Esq., Bombay Civil Service (Retired), Secretary in the Revenue, Statistics, and Commerce Department of the India Office.
- Alexander Mackenzie, Esq., Bengal Civil Service, Secretary to the Government of India in the Home Department.
- Charles Bradley Pritchard, Esq., Bombay Civil Service, Commissioner of Customs, Salt, Opium, and Abkari, and Reporter-General of External Commerce, Bombay.

== Order of the Indian Empire ==
=== Companion of the Order of the Indian Empire (CIE) ===
- Surgeon-General Michael Cudmore Furnell, M.D., Indian Medical Department, Madras, Surgeon-General with the Government of Madras.
- Luchman Das Seth, of Muttra.
- Edward Spence Symes, Esq., Bengal Civil Service, Secretary to the Chief Commissioner of Burmah.
- Rao Bahadur Ranchonlal Chotalal, of Ahmedabad.
- Deputy Surgeon-General Alexander Morison Dallas, Indian Medical Department, Bengal, Inspector-General of Civil Hospitals, Punjab.
- Frederick Charles Kennedy, Esq., Manager of the Irrawaddy Flotilla, Burmah.

== Order of St Michael and St George ==
=== Knight Grand Cross of the Order of St Michael and St George (GCMG) ===
- Major-General Sir Robert Biddulph, R.A., K.C.M.G., C.B., late Her Majesty's High Commissioner and Commander-in-Chief of the Island of Cyprus.
- Sir Francis Clare Ford, K.C.M.G., C.B., Her Majesty's Envoy Extraordinary and Minister Plenipotentiary at Madrid.

=== Honorary Knight Commander of the Order of St Michael and St George (KCMG) ===
- His Highness Abdul Samat, Sultan of Selangore.

=== Knight Commander of the Order of St Michael and St George (KCMG) ===
- Sir John Coode, C.E., Knt., in recognition of services rendered in connection with Colonial Harbours and Marine Works.
- Lieutenant-Colonel Marshall James Clarke (late R.A.), C.M.G., Resident Magistrate in Basutoland.
- Cecil Clementi Smith, Esq., C.M.G., Lieutenant-Governor and Colonial Secretary of Ceylon.
- Donald Alexander Smith, Esq., of Montreal, in the Dominion of Canada.
- Robert Stout, Esq., Premier of New Zealand.
- The Honourable William Stuart, C.B., Her Majesty's Envoy Extraordinary and Minister Plenipotentiary at the Hague.
- The Right Honourable Lord Vivian, C.B., Her Majesty's Envoy Extraordinary and Minister Plenipotentiary at Brussels.
- The Honourable Edmund John Monson, C.B., Her Majesty's Envoy Extraordinary and Minister Plenipotentiary at Copenhagen.
- Lieutenant-Colonel Robert Lambert Playfair, Her Majesty's Consul-General for Algeria and Tunis.

=== Companion of the Order of St Michael and St George (CMG) ===
- Sidney Godolphin Alexander Shippard, Esq., M.A., D.C.L., Administrator and Chief Magistrate of British Bechuanaland, late British Commissioner on Joint Anglo-German Commission in South Africa.
- Lieutenant-Colonel Albert Henry Hime (late R.E.), Colonial Engineer of Natal.
- Commander Graham John Bower (late R.N.), Secretary to Her Majesty's High Commissioner for South Africa.
- Edward Stace Symonds, Esq., Under Treasurer of the Colony of Victoria.
- Charles Meldrum, Esq., FRS, Director of the Royal Alfred Observatory of Mauritius.
- Osbert Chadwick, Esq., C.E., for services rendered in connection with Hydraulic and Sanitary Works in several Colonies.
- Hampden Willis, Esq., Under Colonial Secretary for the Cape of Good Hope.
- Colonel the Honourable George Patrick Hyde Villiers, Her Majesty's Military Attaché at Paris.
- Percy Sanderson, Esq., Her Majesty's Consul-General for Roumania.
