= 1900 New Year Honours =

Queen Victoria's appointments

The 1900 New Year Honours were appointments by Queen Victoria to various orders and honours of the United Kingdom and British India.

The list was published in The Times on 1 January 1900, and the various honours were gazetted in The London Gazette on 2 January 1900 and 16 January 1900.

The recipients of honours are displayed or referred to as they were styled before their new honour, and arranged by honour and where appropriate by rank (Knight Grand Cross, Knight Commander, etc.) then divisions (Military, Civil).

== Peerages ==
=== Baron ===
- Sir Henry Stafford Northcote, Bart., CB
- The Right Honourable Sir John Lubbock, Bart., MP

== Privy Council ==
- Evelyn Baring, 1st Viscount Cromer, GCB
- Montagu Corry, 1st Baron Rowton, KCVO, CB
- William Wither Bramston Beach, Esq., MP

== Privy Council of Ireland ==
- Sir David Harrel, KCB, Under-Secretary for Ireland

== Knight Bachelor ==
- Theodore William Doxford, Esq., MP
- Walter Thorburn, Esq., MP
- Thomas Lauder Brunton, Esq., MD, FRS
- James Balfour Paul, Esq., Lyon King of Arms
- Gerald Raoul de Courcy Perry, Esq., CMG, Her Majesty's Consul-General at Antwerp
- George Dalhousie Ramsay Esq., CB
- Thomas Henry Tacon, Esq.
- Honourable William Macpherson, Judge of the High Court, Bengal
- Vembakkan Bhashyam Aiyangar, CIE, Dewan Bahadur, acting Advocate-General of Madras Presidency
- Bhalchandra Krishna Bhatawadekar, Esq., Chairman of the Standing Committee of the Municipal Corporation of Bombay
- Honourable John Stokell Dodds, CMG, Chief Justice of Tasmania
- Surgeon-General Francis Henry Lovell, CMG, Member of Executive and Legislative Council of Trinidad
- Malcolm Donald McEacharn, Esq., Mayor of Melbourne

== The Most Honourable Order of the Bath ==
=== Knight Commander of the Order of the Bath (KCB) ===
Civil Division

Captain William de Wiveleslie Abney, CB, FRS, Director of the Science and Art Department.

=== Companions of the Order of the Bath (CB) ===
Civil Division

- John George Barton, Esq., Commissioner of Valuation, Ireland.
- George Buchanan, Esq., for services on the Venezuelan Boundary Commission.
- Robert Chalmers, Esq., of HM Treasury.
- Henry Hardinge Samuel Cunynghame, Esq., of the Home Office.
- Major-General Edward Robert Festing, FRS, late Royal Engineers, Director of the Science Museum.
- Everard im Thurn, Esq., CMG, for services on the Venezuelan Boundary Commission.
- John Lowndes Gorst, Esq., Financial Advisor to His Highness the Khedive.
- Colonel James Leslie Macdonald, RE.
- Lieutenant-Colonel Alexander Burness McHardy, RE, chairman, Prison Commission, Scotland.

== Order of the Star of India ==
=== Companion of the Order of the Star of India (CSI) ===
- Richard Gillies Hardy, Esq., Indian Civil Service

== Order of St Michael and St George ==
=== Knights Grand Cross of the Order of St Michael and St George (GCMG) ===
- The Right Honourable Sir Joseph West Ridgeway, KCB, KCSI, Governor and Commander-in-Chief of the Island of Ceylon and its Dependencies.
- Sir John Bramston, DCL, KCMG, CB, late Assistant Under-Secretary of State for the Colonies.

=== Knights Commander of the Order of St Michael and St George (KCMG) ===
- Malachy Bowes Daly, Esq., QC, Lieutenant-Governor of the province of Nova Scotia, in Canada.
- The Honourable Sir James George Lee Steere, Knt., Speaker of the Legislative Assembly of Western Australia.
- The Honourable John Alexander Cockburn, MD, formerly Premier of South Australia, now Agent-General in London for that Colony.
- Henry John Jourdain, Esq., CMG, formerly Member of the Legislative Council of the Colony of Mauritius.
- George Chardin Denton, Esq., CMG, Colonial Secretary of the Colony of Lagos.
- Charles Norton Edgcumbe Eliot, Esq., CB, of His Majesty's Diplomatic Service, late British Commissioner in Samoa.

=== Companions of the Order of St Michael and St George (CMG) ===
- John Pringle, Esq., MB, Member of the Privy Council and Legislative Council of the Island of Jamaica.
- Patrick Manson, Esq., MD, Medical Adviser to the Colonial Office.
- Charles Alexander Harris, Esq., of the Colonial Office, for services in connection with the Venezuelan Boundary Arbitration.
- Alexander Murray Ashmore, Esq., Receiver-General and Chief Collector of Customs and Excise of the Island of Cyprus.
- Henry Reeve, Esq., Colonial Engineer of the Gambia, for services as the British Representative on the Anglo-French Commission for the delimitation of the Gambia Boundary.
- Wordsworth Poole, Esq., MB, for services as Principal Medical Officer of the West African Frontier Force on the Niger.
- Colonel Trevor Patrick Breffney Ternan, DSO, Warwickshire Regiment, Acting British Commissioner in Uganda, for services in connection with the recent mutiny in Uganda.
- Clifford Henry Craufurd, Esq., Her Majesty's Consul and Sub-Commissioner in the East Africa Protectorate, for services in connection with the recent mutiny in Uganda.
- John Ainsworth, Esq., Her Majesty's Vice-Consul and Sub-Commissioner in the East Africa Protectorate, for services in connection with the recent mutiny in Uganda.
- Stanley Tomkins, Esq., Assistant in the Uganda Protectorate, for services in connection with the recent mutiny in Uganda.
- Archibald Donald Mackinnon, Esq., MD, Principal Transport Officer for the Uganda Protectorate, for services in connection with the recent mutiny in Uganda.
- Rear-Admiral Reginald Neville Custance, Royal Navy, for services in Crete.
- Captain Harry Tremenheere Grenfell, Royal Navy, for services in Crete.
- Captain Leslie Creery Stuart, Royal Navy, for services in Samoa.
- Captain Frederick Charles Doveton Sturdee, Royal Navy, for services in Samoa.

== Order of the Indian Empire ==
=== Knights Commander of the Order of the Indian Empire (KCIE) ===
- Edward Spence Symes, Esq., CIE, Indian Civil Service, Chief Secretary to the Government of Burma.
- S. Subramaniya Aiyar, CIE, Dewan Bahadur, Puisne Judge of the High Court of Judicature at Fort St. George.

=== Companions of the Order of the Indian Empire (CIE) ===
- John Sturrock, Esq., late Indian Civil Service.
- John Stuart Beresford, Esq., Chief Engineer and Secretary to the Government of the Punjab, in the Public Works Department (Irrigation Branch).
- Lieutenant-Colonel Malcolm John Meade, Indian Staff Corps.
- Edward Louis Cappel, Esq., Indian Civil Service.
- Lancelot Hare, Esq., Indian Civil Service.
- Captain George Olof Roos-Keppel, Indian Staff Corps.
- George Moss Harriott, Esq., Executive Engineer in the Public Works Department, Central Provinces.
- Alexander Martin Lindsay, Esq.
- Maung On Gaing, Honorary Magistrate, Rangoon.
- Khan Bahadur Sardar Muhammad Yakub walad Shaikh Ismail.
- Frederick George Brunton Trevor, Esq., Director of Funds, India Office.
- Francis Whitmore Smith, Esq., Assistant Secretary Military Department, India Office.
- Rai Bahadur Kalika Dass Datt, Dewan of the Cooch Behar State.
