= William John Keith =

British colonial administrator

Sir William John Keith, KCSI, CIE (13 April 1873 – 22 January 1937) was a British colonial administrator in Burma.

== Biography ==
William Keith was born in Edinburgh, the eldest child of Davidson Keith (1842–1921), an advertising agent, and Margaret Stobie Keith, née Drysdale (1851–1911). All his five siblings were associated with the British Empire in Burma and India. Arthur Berriedale Keith (1879 –1944) was a leading constitutional law and Sanskrit scholar; Steuart Keith (died 1925) was a sessions judge in Burma; and Alan Davidson Keith (died 1928) was a barrister in Burma. His two sisters married British expatriates in India and Burma.

Keith was educated at the Royal High School, Edinburgh and the University of Edinburgh, where he took first-class honours in Classics in 1895. He joined the Indian Civil Service the same year, ranking first in the examinations, then spent a year as probationer at Christ Church, Oxford before reaching Burma in 1896.

He was appointed secretary to the Financial Commissioner of Burma in 1899, Revenue Secretary in 1912, and Commissioner of Magwe Division in 1919. He became a nominated member of the Indian Legislative Assembly in 1921. The following year, he was appointed Financial Commissioner and Officiating Development Commissioner, In 1913, he became first member and Vice-President of the Executive Council of Burma. In 1925 he served as acting Governor of Burma. Passed over for the governorship in 1927, he retired in 1928 to Dunbar, where he died in 1937.

In 1915, Keith married Isabel Adamson, daughter of Sir Harvey Adamson, Lieutenant-Governor of Burma. They had a son and two daughters.

Keith was made a CIE in the 1917 New Year Honours, a knight bachelor in 1925, and a KCSI in the 1928 Birthday Honours. He was the only man to be appointed KCSI exclusively for services in relation to Burma.

== Assessment ==
The Oxford Dictionary of National Biography commented that:

Keith's work was marked by inexhaustible attention to detail and a readiness to interfere at the lowest levels of administration, characteristics which did not endear him to other civil servants or the expatriate commercial community. He was known for his wordy, sometimes pompous, minutes and was easily caricatured as a humourless Scot. Whatever the irritation suffered by his European colleagues, however, his patience and lack of grandeur made him popular with the first Burmese politicians who tasted power under diarchy. In an era when most Europeans thought the Burmese incapable of any form of self-government, Keith was one of the few prepared to treat his Burmese colleagues as intimates.
