= Charles Scott (ambassador) =

British diplomat

Sir Charles Stewart Scott, GCB, GCMG, PC (17 March 1838 – 26 April 1924) was a British diplomat.

Scott was educated at Cheltenham College. He started his career as attaché at Paris (1859); transferred to Dresden (1859) and Copenhagen (1862); promoted to be a 3rd secretary at Copenhagen (1863); transferred to Madrid (1865) and Berne (1866); promoted to be a 2nd secretary at Mexico (1866); transferred to Lisbon (1868), Stuttgart (1871), Munich (1872), Vienna (1873), St Petersburg (1874), and Darmstadt (1877); secretary of legation at Coburg (1879); from 1877 to 1883 repeatedly acting chargé d'affaires at Darmstadt and in 1881 at Stuttgart; promoted to be a secretary of embassy at Berlin (1883–1893); promoted to be envoy extraordinary and minister plenipotentiary to the Swiss Confederation; transferred to Copenhagen (1893–1898); from 1898 to 1904 he was British ambassador to Imperial Russia.

Scott was appointed a Companion of the Order of the Bath (CB) in the 1886 Birthday Honours, and was appointed a Knight Commander of the Order of St Michael and St George (KCMG) in 1896, and promoted to Knight Grand Cross of the Order (GCMG) in 1899. He was appointed to the Privy Council in 1899. He was promoted to Knight Grand Cross of the Order of the Bath (GCB) in the 1899 Birthday Honours.

== See also ==
- List of Ambassadors from the United Kingdom to Russia

Diplomatic posts
Preceded by Francis Ottiwell Adams	Envoy Extraordinary and Minister Plenipotentiary to the Swiss Confederation; 1888–1893	Succeeded by Frederick Robert St John
Preceded by Hugh Guion MacDonell	Envoy Extraordinary and Minister Plenipotentiary to Denmark; 1893–1898	Succeeded by Edmund Fane
Preceded by Nicholas O'Conor	Ambassador to Russia; 1898–1904	Succeeded by Charles Harding
