= Alexander Murray Ashmore =

Sir Alexander Murray Ashmore
- Born: 26 February 1855; Paddington, Middlesex
- Died: 7 December 1906 (aged 51); Colombo, Ceylon
- Occupation: public servant
- Organization: Ceylon Civil Service
- Spouse: Dorothy Emily Augusta Shaw (m. 1897)
- Children: Dorothy Julia, Isabel Lilian

Sir Alexander Murray Ashmore KCMG (26 February 1855 - 7 December 1906) was the colonial secretary of British Guinea from 1901 to 1904 and the lieutenant-governor and colonial secretary of Ceylon from 1904 to 1906.

Alexander Murray Ashmore was born on 26 February 1855 in Paddington, Middlesex. On 31 August 1876 he joined the Ceylon Civil Service, arriving in Ceylon on 6 December. He served in a number of roles, including Police Magistrate Panwila (1878), Police Magistrate Kandy (1882), office assistant Western Province (1883), office assistant Central Province (1884), Government Agent Sabaragamuwa (1892), and principal assistant to the colonial secretary of Ceylon 1892-94.

In December 1894 he was appointed the colonial secretary of the Gold Coast and thirteen months later in 1896 the receiver-general of Cyprus and then acting colonial secretary.

Ashmore married Dorothy Emily Augusta Shaw (1875 - 1952), daughter of Reverend Charles John Kenward Shaw and Julia Elizabeth Boteler, on 14 January 1897. They had two children, Dorothy Julia (1897-1972), and Isabel Lilian (1899-1969).

In 1900 Ashmore was appointed a companion in the Order of St Michael and St George, as part of the New Years Honours, for his services as receiver-general and chief collector of customs and excise of the Island of Cyprus.

Between 1900 and 1901 he served on the Transvaal Concessions Commission in South Africa and London, before taking up the position of Colonial Secretary of British Guinea in April 1901.

He was appointed the colonial secretary of Ceylon on 10 September 1904, succeeding Sir Everard Ferdinand im Thurn. In the 1905 Birthday Honours he was upgraded to a Knight Commander in the Order of St Michael and St George, for his service as lieutenant-governor and colonial secretary of Ceylon. He served as colonial secretary until his death, in Colombo at Temple Trees, on 7 December 1906 from appendicitis.
