= Albert Fytche =

Lieutenant-General Albert Fytche CSI
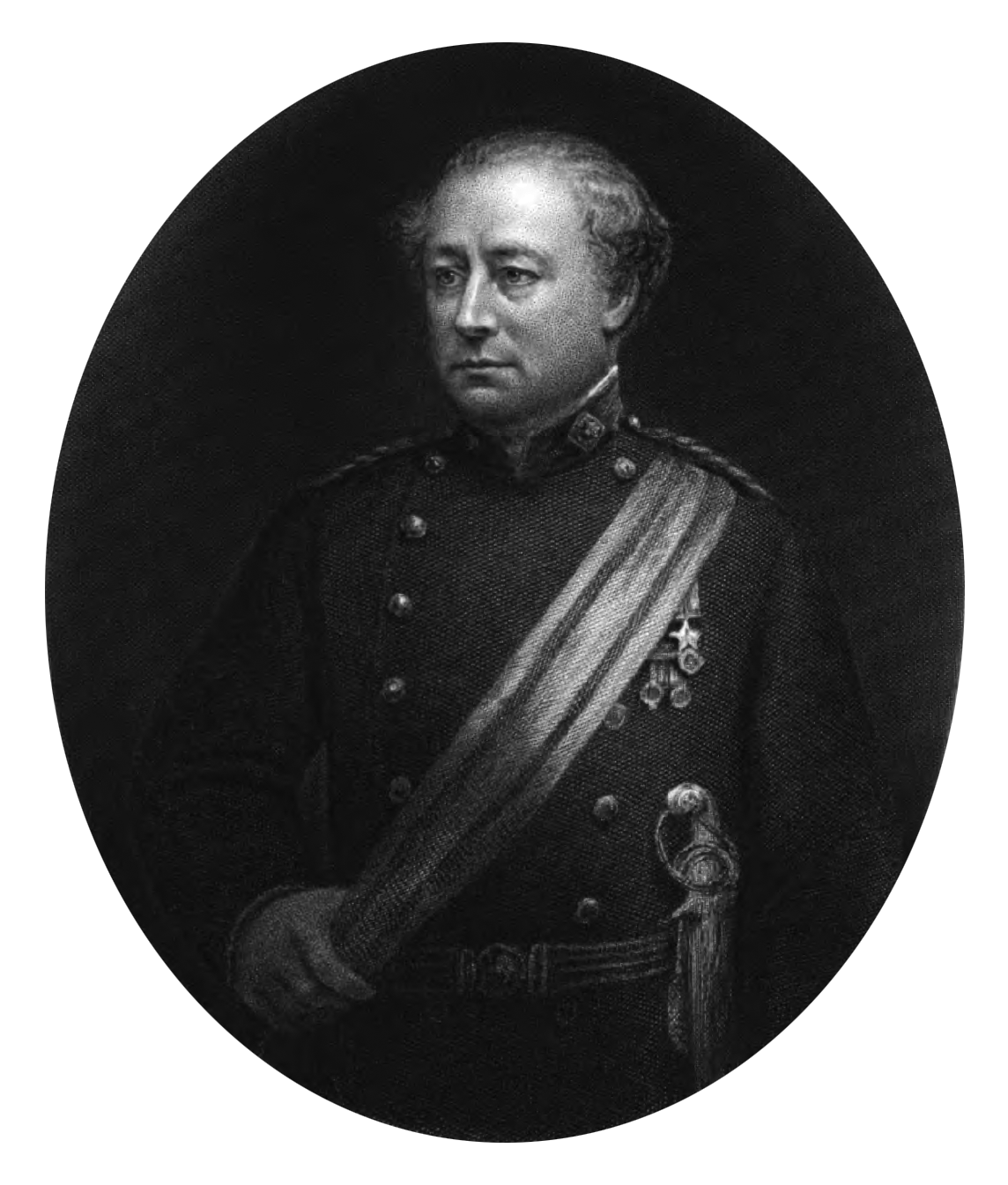

2nd Chief Commissioner of Burma
- In office 16 February 1867 – 18 April 1871
- Preceded by: Arthur Purves Phayre
- Succeeded by: Ashley Eden

Personal details
- Born: 21 September 1820
- Died: 16 June 1892 (aged 71) Bournemouth, Dorset, England
- Occupation: Administrator

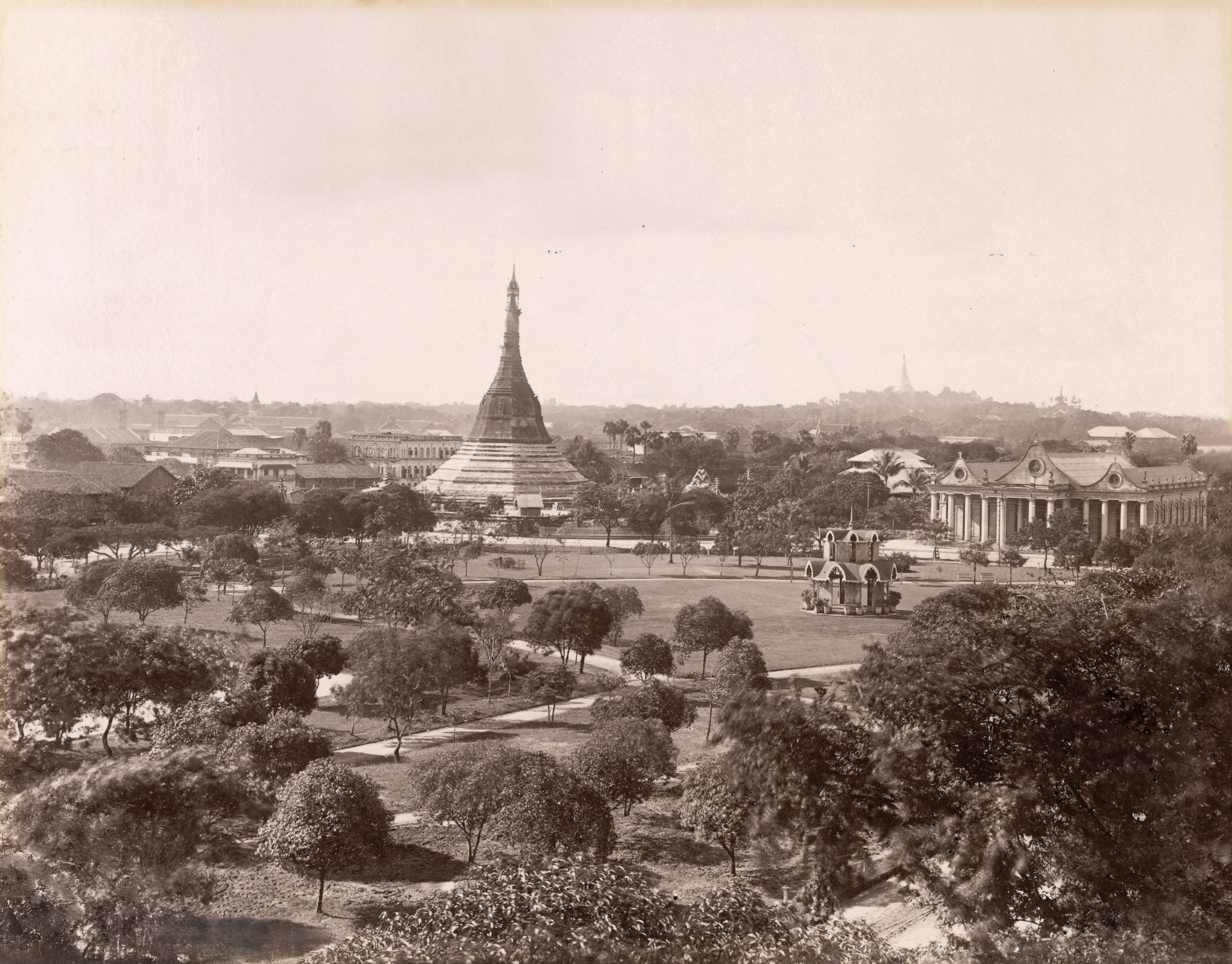
Fytche Square, Rangoon, (now Mahabandula Garden), looking towards the Sule Pagoda. The square dates from 1867 to 1868, when a vacant, swampy site originally known as Tank Square was cleared and laid out as a public recreation ground.

Lieutenant-General Albert Fytche CSI (21 September 1820 – 16 June 1892) was a British Indian Army officer who served as Chief Commissioner of the British Crown Colony of Burma from February 1867 to April 1871. Educated at Rugby School and commissioned in the 1830s, he was promoted to captain in the 1840s. A string of promotions followed: major in 1853, lieutenant-colonel in 1862, colonel in 1864, major-general in 1868 and lieutenant-general in 1877.

The bird Bambusicola fytchii is named in his honour.

He was the son of John Fytche of Thorpe Hall, Louth, Lincolnshire, and Anne Wilson. He was a descendant of Ralph Fitch and William Fytche. His father's sister, Elizabeth, married Rev. George Clayton Tennyson, making him a first cousin of Alfred, Lord Tennyson, to whom he dedicated his book, Burma, Past and Present.

== Works ==
- Official Narrative of and Papers connected with the Expedition to explore the Trade Routes to China via Bhamo under the guidance of Major E. B. Sladen, Political Agent, Mandalay (PDF), Rangon: British Burma Press, 1869
- Fytche, Albert (1878), Burma, Past and Present, C. K. Paul & Co. Volume I Volume II

Government offices
| Preceded by Sir Arthur Purves Phayre | Chief Commissioner of British Crown Colony of Burma; 1867–1871 | Succeeded by Ashley Eden |
