= Charles Bolton (British Army officer) =

English rugby union player

Brigadier Charles Bolton CBE
- Born: Charles Arthur Bolton; 3 January 1882; Kensington, England
- Died: 23 November 1963 (aged 81); Eastbourne, England
- School: Marlborough College
- University: New College, Oxford

Rugby union career
- Position: Wing-forward
International career
Years	Team	Apps	(Points)
1909	England	1	(0)

Charles Arthur Bolton (3 January 1882 – 23 November 1963) was a British Army officer and an English international rugby union player.

== Biography ==
Born in Kensington, Bolton was educated at Marlborough College and New College, Oxford.

Bolton played rugby for United Services and was called up by England as a reserve for their match against the 1908–09 Wallabies, before gaining his only cap in a win over France at Leicester, utilised as a wing-forward.

A brigadier in the British Army, Bolton was made a Commander of the Order of the British Empire in 1919.

Bolton married the daughter of colonial official Sir Henry John Jourdain.

== See also ==
- List of England national rugby union players
