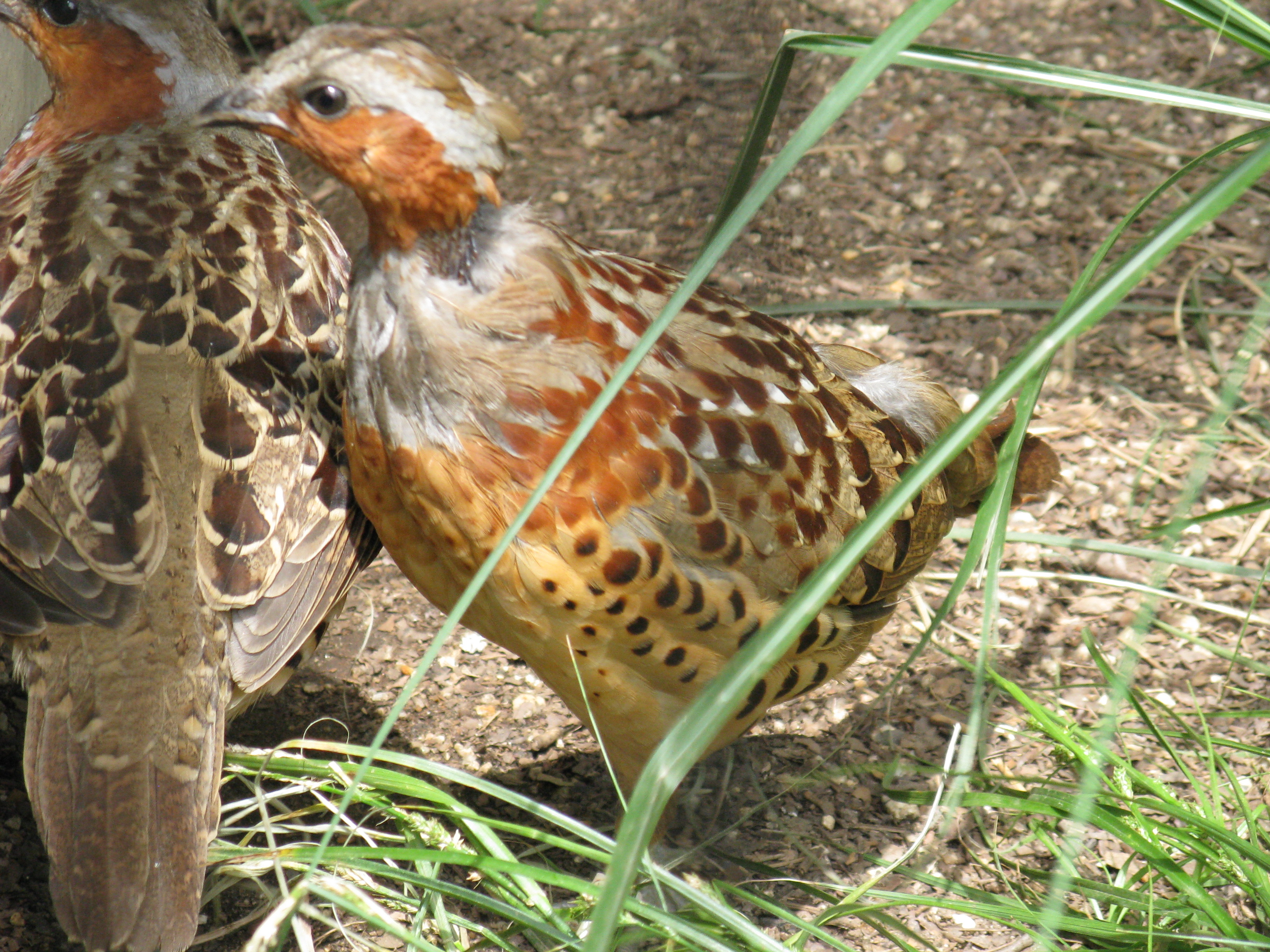
- Chinese bamboo partridge (Bambusicola thoracicus)

Scientific classification
- Kingdom: Animalia
- Phylum: Chordata
- Class: Aves
- Order: Galliformes
- Family: Phasianidae
- Tribe: Gallini
- Genus: Bambusicola; Gould, 1863

Type species
- Perdix thoracica Temminck, 1815

Species
- see text

= Bamboo partridge =

Bamboo partridges

Genus of birds

Bamboo partridges, sometimes called ridge partridges, are medium-sized non-migratory birds of the genus Bambusicola in the family Phasianidae.They have a wide native distribution throughout Asia. They were formerly grouped in the Perdicinae subfamily of the Phasianidae (pheasants, quail, etc.). However, molecular research suggests that partridges are not a distinct taxon within the family Phasianidae, but that some species are closer to the pheasants, while others are closer to the junglefowl. Phylogenetic evidence supports the bamboo partridges as being the sister genus to the junglefowl.

== Species ==
There are three species in the genus:

Genus Bambusicola – Gould, 1863 – three species
Common name	Scientific name and subspecies	Range	Size and ecology	IUCN status and estimated population
Mountain bamboo partridge	Bambusicola fytchii Anderson, 1871	Bangladesh, Tibet, India, Laos, Myanmar, Thailand, and Vietnam.	Size: Habitat: Diet:	LC
Chinese bamboo partridge	Bambusicola thoracicus (Temminck, 1815)	East China, introduced to Japan	Size: Habitat: Diet:	LC
Taiwan bamboo partridge	Bambusicola sonorivox Gould, 1863	Taiwan.	Size: Habitat: Diet:	LC
