= Arthur Purves Phayre =

Chief Commissioner

Lieutenant General Sir Arthur Purves Phayre GCMG KCSI CB
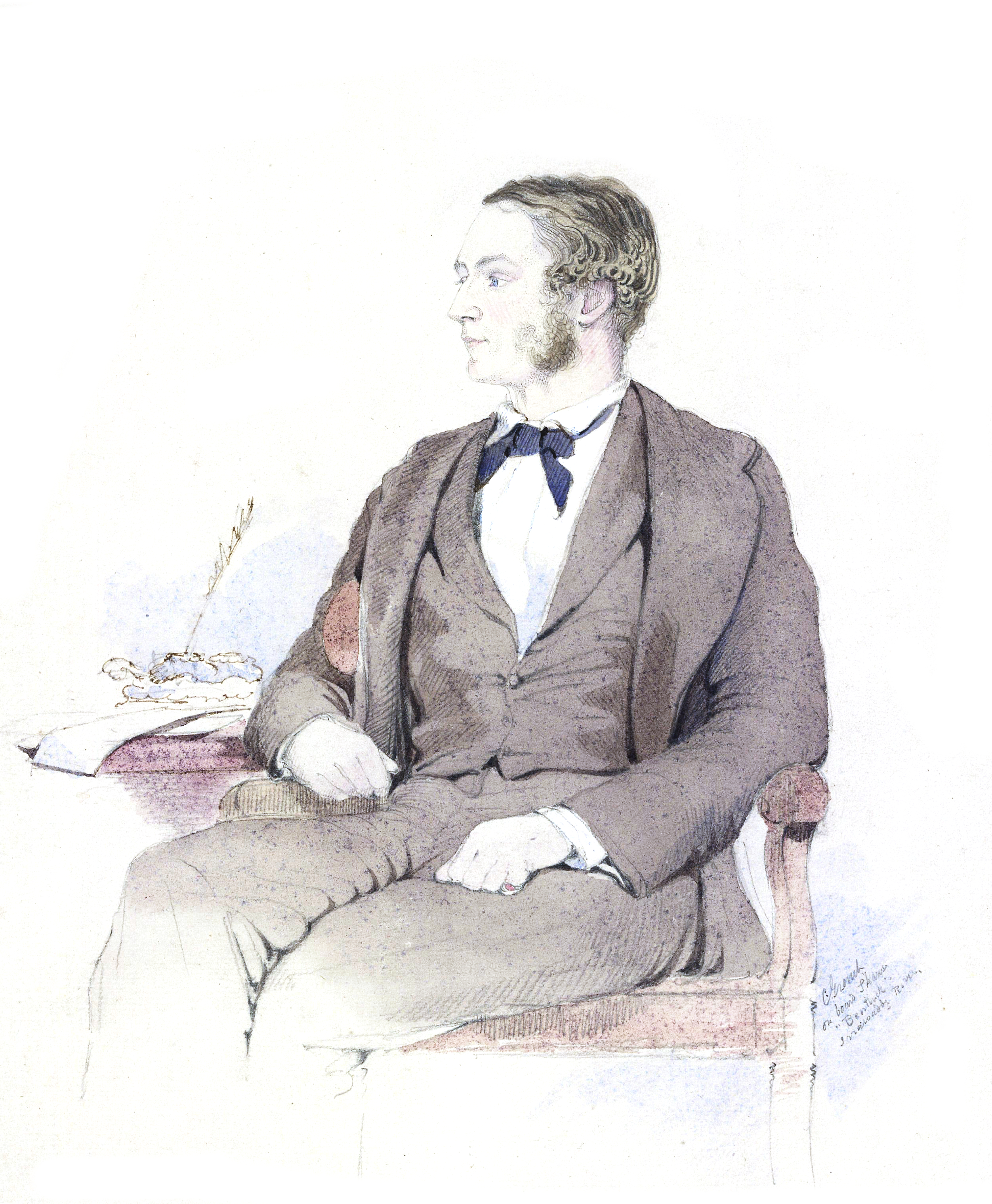
- Portrait by Colesworthey Grant (1855)

12th Governor of Mauritius
- In office 1874–1878
- Preceded by: Office established

1st Chief Commissioner of Burma
- In office 31 January 1862 – 16 February 1867
- Preceded by: Office established
- Succeeded by: Albert Fytche

Personal details
- Born: 7 May 1812 Shrewsbury, Shropshire, England
- Died: 14 December 1885
- Occupation: Administrator
- Awards: Knight Grand Cross of the Order of St Michael and St George; Knight Commander of the Order of the Star of India; Companions of the Order of the Bath

Military service
- Allegiance: United Kingdom
- Branch/service: British Indian Army
- Rank: Lieutenant General

Sir Arthur Purves Phayre GCMG KCSI CB (7 May 1812 – 14 December 1885) was a career British Indian Army officer who was the first Commissioner of British Burma, 1862–1867, Governor of Mauritius, 1874–1878, and author.

== Early life ==
Phayre was born in Shrewsbury and educated at Shrewsbury School. His father Richard Phayre, Esq. was grandson of Colonel Robert Phayre, of Killoughram Forest. A brother, General Sir Robert Phayre (1820–1897), also served in India and Afghanistan.

He joined the Indian Army in 1828. In 1846 he was appointed assistant to the commissioner of the province of Tenasserim, Burma, and in 1849 he was made commissioner of Arakan. After the Second Anglo-Burmese War (1852), he became commissioner of Pegu. He was made a brevet captain in 1854 and in 1862 he was promoted to lieutenant-colonel.

== Work ==
=== Government office ===
In 1862, Arthur Phayre was made commissioner for the entire province of British Burma, now Myanmar. He left Burma in 1867. He served as 12th governor of Mauritius from 21 September 1874 to 31 December 1878.

He was appointed a CB in 1864, promoted to colonel in 1866 and was knighted with the KCSI in 1867. In 1871, he was promoted to major-general and was promoted to lieutenant-general in 1873. He retired to Bray in Ireland and was appointed a GCMG in 1878.

=== Naturalist ===
Phayre wrote the first standard History of Burma (1883). He is commemorated in the names of a number of animals, including:

- Phayre's leaf monkey, Trachypithecus phayrei
- Indochinese flying squirrel, Hylopetes phayrei
- Phayre's squirrel, Callosciurus phayrei
- Eared pitta, Hydrornis phayrei
- Brown Asian forest tortoise, Manouria emys phayrei
- Ashy-headed green pigeon, Treron phayrei

=== Numismatist ===
Phayre collected coins (some are now in the British Museum collection), and in 1882 wrote Coins of Arakan, of Pegu, and of Burma, International Numismata Orientalia, part 8. The title page notes that he was a corresponding member of the Société Académique Indo-Chinoise. He was also a member of the Royal Asiatic Society.

== Arms ==
Coat of arms of Arthur Purves Phayre
Notes Granted by John Bernard Burke, Ulster King of Arms, 30 August 1867. Crest A dove Proper gorged with an Eastern crown Or in the beak an olive branch Vert. Escutcheon Gules a cross moline Argent surmounted of a bend Azure in the sinister chief point an Eastern crown Or all within a bordure of the last. Motto Virtute Tutus

Descendants, via his brother, Robert (allegedly he had no wife or children of his own, but may have married, or adopted a daughter - Mary/Maria, a daughter of King Mindon Min): Colonel Robert Bernard Phayre MC 2/4th Prince of Wales Own Gurkha Rifle(grandson of General Robert, via father, also Robert - assassinated in Burma - and his son Colonel Robert Desmond Hensley Phayre Royal Artillery, son Lt Col Robert (Robin) Dermot Spinks Phayre LI, cousin Col Terence Peter Phayre Knott MC RM, of whom son Captain Robert Knott AAC changed name by deed poll to Phayre, to prevent family name dying out. There are now 25 Phayres in the family history.

Government offices
Preceded by first incumbent	Chief Commissioner of British Crown Colony of Burma; 1862–1867	Succeeded by Albert Fytche
Preceded by Arthur Hamilton-Gordon	Governor of Mauritius; 1874–1878	Succeeded by Sir George Bowen
