= Charles Umpherston Aitchison =

Scottish colonial administrator

Sir Charles Umpherston Aitchison
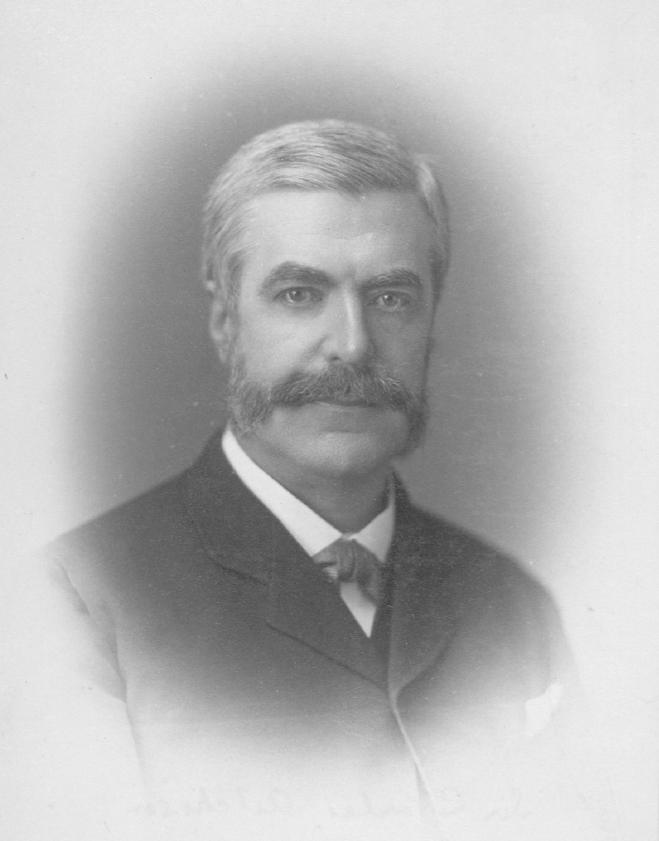

Lieutenant Governor of the Punjab
- In office 3 April 1882 – 2 April 1887
- Governors General: The Marquess of Ripon; The Marquess of Dufferin and Ava
- Preceded by: Sir Robert Eyles Egerton
- Succeeded by: Sir James Broadwood Lyall

Chief Commissioner of Burma
- In office 30 March 1878 – 2 July 1880
- Monarch: Victoria I
- Preceded by: Sir Augustus Rivers Thompson
- Succeeded by: Sir Charles Bernard

Personal details
- Born: 20 May 1832 Edinburgh, Scotland, United Kingdom
- Died: 18 February 1896 (aged 63) Oxford, England, United Kingdom
- Resting place: Wolvercote Cemetery, Oxford
- Spouse: Beatrice Lyell
- Education: University of Edinburgh
- Occupation: Administrator

Sir Charles Umpherston Aitchison KCSI CIE (20 May 1832 – 18 February 1896) was a Scottish colonial administrator who was Lieutenant Governor of the Punjab, then a province of British India. He founded Aitchison College, Lahore in 1886. He served as Chief Commissioner of the British Crown Colony of Burma from March 1878 to May 1880.

== Biography ==
=== Education ===
Charles Umpherston Aitchison, born in Edinburgh on 20 May 1832, was the son of Hugh Aitchison of that city, by his wife Elizabeth, daughter of Charles Umpherston of Loanhead near Edinburgh. He was educated at the Royal High School and the University of Edinburgh, where he took the degree of M.A. on 23 April 1853. While a university student, Aitchison attended the lectures of Sir William Hamilton on logic and metaphysics. He afterwards passed some time in Germany, where he studied the works of Fichte, and attended the lectures of Tholuck at the University of Halle.

=== Indian civil service ===
In 1855 he ranked fifth at the first competitive examination for the Indian Civil Service, and after spending a year in England in the study of law and oriental languages he landed at Kolkata (then Calcutta) on 26 September 1856. In March 1857 he was appointed an assistant in Hissár, then a district of the North-Western Provinces and in the following month was transferred to the Punjab, where he joined shortly after the outbreak of the Indian Rebellion of 1857. Owing to this transfer he escaped a massacre of Europeans which took place at Hissár on 29 May. His first station in his new province was Amritsar, and immediately after his arrival there he was employed under the orders of the deputy commissioner in carrying out the measures which were taken to prevent the Jalandhar mutineers from crossing the Beas River. Shortly afterwards he was appointed personal assistant to the judicial commissioner, in which capacity he compiled A Manual of the Criminal Law of the Panjáb (1860). While thus employed, he was much thrown with Sir John Laird Mair Lawrence (afterwards Baron Lawrence), with whose policy, especially on the Central Asian question, and on British relations with Afghanistan, he was strongly imbued during the remainder of his life. In 1892 he contributed a memoir of Lord Lawrence to Sir William Wilson Hunter's Rulers of India series.

In 1859 he joined the secretariat of the government of India as under-secretary in the political department, and served there until 1865, when, at the instance of Sir John Lawrence, then governor-general, in order that he might acquire administrative experience, he took up administrative work in the Punjab, serving first as a deputy-commissioner and subsequently officiating as commissioner of Lahore. In 1868 he rejoined the secretariat as foreign secretary, and retained that appointment until 1878.

As secretary Aitchison was extremely industrious and thorough in his work. He exercised a marked influence on successive governors-general, who regarded him as a wise and trusted adviser. During the earlier part of his service in the Indian foreign office he commenced the compilation of a valuable work entitled A Collection of Treaties, Engagements, and Sanads relating to India and neighbouring Countries; the first volume appeared at Calcutta in 1862, and eleven volumes were issued by 1892; each treaty is prefaced by a clear historical narrative. In 1875, he published a treatise on The Native States of India, with the leading cases illustrating the principles which underlie their relations with the British government. A staunch believer in the policy of masterly inactivity, he regarded with grave apprehension the measures which, carried out under the government of Lord Lytton, culminated in the Afghan war of 1878–9.

=== British Burma ===
Before the war broke out in 1878 he accepted the appointment of chief commissioner of British Burma. When holding that office he raised two questions of considerable importance. The first was the question of the opium trade as bearing upon Burma. The second had reference to the relations of certain English public servants with the women of the country. Neither of these questions was dealt with officially by Lytton's government; but with reference to the second the viceroy intimated semi-officially that he disapproved of a circular which Aitchison had issued, as mixing up morals with politics. After Aitchison's departure from the province both these questions were taken up by his successor, who received the support of Lord Ripon's government in dealing with them. The number of licensed opium shops was then reduced to one-third of those previously licensed, and the consumption of licit opium was reduced by two-fifths, involving a loss of revenue of four lakhs (400,000) of rupees. On the other question, the principle of Aitchison's circular, stopping the promotion of officers who continued the practice which he had denounced, was enforced.

=== Punjab ===
In 1881 Aitchison left Burma, to become on 4 April 1882, lieutenant-governor of the Punjab. His government there was very successful, and — according to the Dictionary of National Biography - popular with all classes of the people. Amongst his major achievements in the field of public education, at this time, were the establishment of the Aitchison College and the University of the Punjab, both at Lahore. He was a staunch advocate of the policy of advancing indigenous Indians in the public service as they proved their fitness for higher posts and for more responsible duties. On this point, in connection with what is known as the Ilbert Bill, he advocated measures even more liberal than those proposed by Lord Ripon's government.

He had intended to leave India for good when his lieutenant-governorship came to an end in 1887, but being invited by Lord Dufferin to join the council of the governor-general and give the viceroy the benefit of his experience on the many questions which had to be dealt with consequent upon the annexation of Upper Burma, he returned to India for another nineteen months. During the latter part of his government of the Punjab he had discharged the additional duty of presiding over the public service commission, and this duty he continued to perform after joining the governor-general's council. He gave unremitting attention to this work, and by his influence over the somewhat heterogeneous body of which the commission was composed he induced them to present a unanimous report.

He retired and finally left India in November 1888. Early in the following year he settled in London, but subsequently moved to Oxford. In 1881 he was nominated Knight Commander of the Order of the Star of India, and in 1882 Companion of the Order of the Indian Empire. He received the degree of LL.D. from the university of Edinburgh on 24 February 1877, and that of honorary M.A. from Oxford University in 1895.

=== Personal life ===
Aitchison, a religious man, was a supporter of Christian missions while in India, and after his retirement was an active member of the committee of the Church Missionary Society. He died at Oxford on 18 February 1896.

Aitchison married, on 2 February 1863, Beatrice Lyell, one of four daughters of James Cox (1808–1875), D.L., of Clement Park, Forfarshire, who was the senior partner of Cox Brothers and Co, owners of Camperdown Works in Lochee, Dundee. Their daughter Beatrice Clementia married British Indian Army official James Dunlop Smith.

== Published works ==
These include:

- Charles Umpherston Aitchison, ed., A Collection of Treaties, Engagements, and Sanads Relating to India and Neighbouring Countries; 7 vols. Calcutta (with Index compiled by Manuel Belletty). 1862-65
  - Revised edition. 8 vols. 1876.
  - 3rd edition. 11 vols. 1892.
  - 4th edition. 13 vols. 1909.
  - 5th edition. 14 vols. 1929–33.

Preceded by Sir Augustus Rivers Thompson	Chief Commissioner of British Crown Colony of Burma; 1878–1880	Succeeded by Sir Charles Edward Bernard
