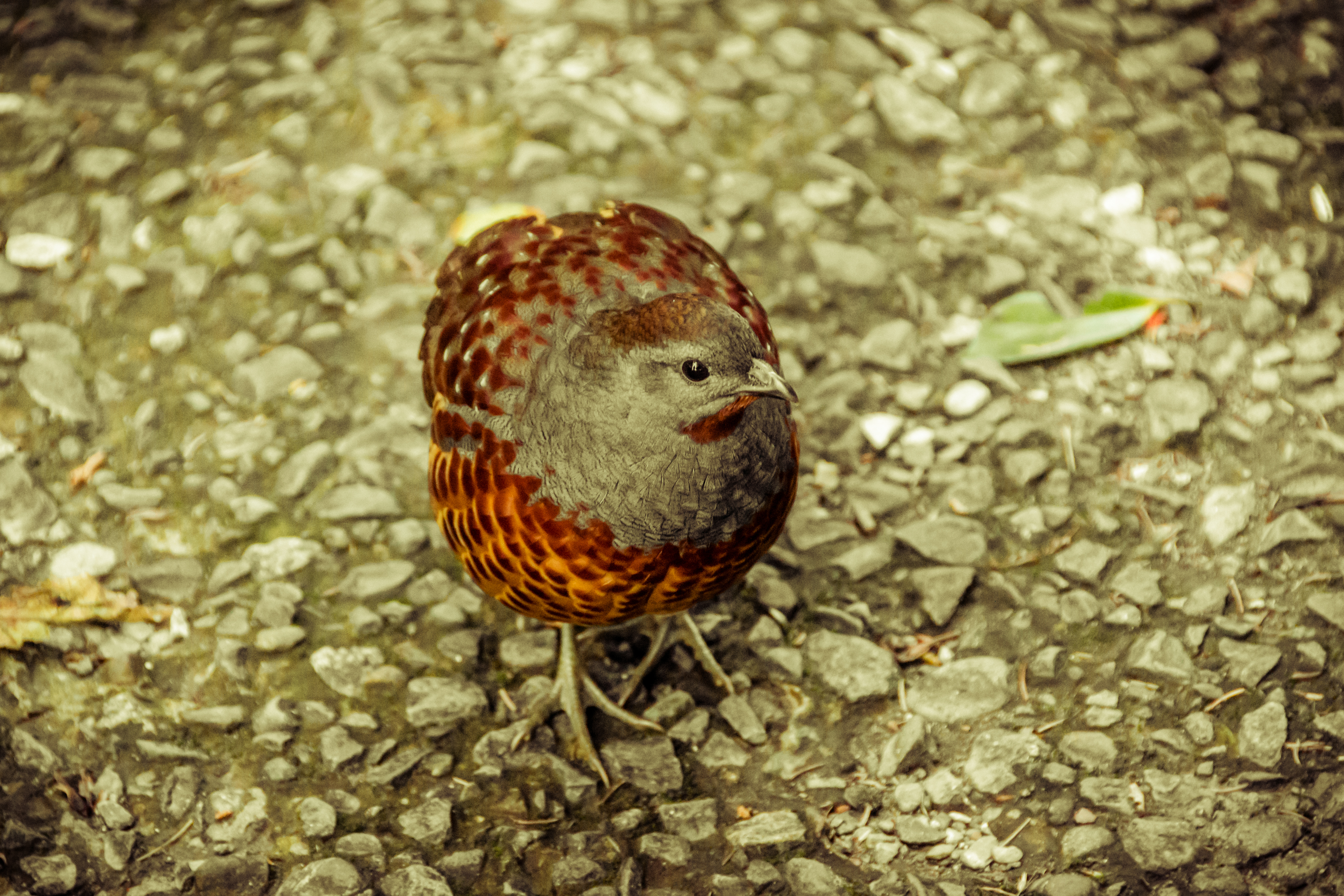

Conservation status
- Least Concern (IUCN 3.1)

Scientific classification
- Kingdom: Animalia
- Phylum: Chordata
- Class: Aves
- Order: Galliformes
- Family: Phasianidae
- Genus: Bambusicola
- Species: B. sonorivox

Binomial name
- Bambusicola sonorivox Gould, 1863

= Taiwan bamboo partridge =

Species of bird

The Taiwan bamboo partridge (Bambusicola sonorivox) is a species of bird in the family Phasianidae. It is endemic to Taiwan. It was formerly considered a subspecies of the Chinese bamboo partridge.

It has several onomatopoeic names known among Taiwanese indigenous peoples: tkurih (Seediq and Truku), tikulhat (Thao), tikulas (Bunun), tjikulai (Paiwan), and tikolac (Amis).
