= Henry John Jourdain =

British colonial official (1835–1901)

Sir Henry John Jourdain, KCMG, DL (1835 – 14 May 1901) was a British colonial official in the Colony of Mauritius.

== Career ==
Jourdain was born in 1835, the son of Frederick J. Jourdain, of London, whose family was of Huguenot descent. He was educated at Blackheath and in Paris.

Jourdain was employed in the colonial service, and went to Mauritius, where he was a government member on the General Board of Health from 1866 to 1874, and a member of the Legislative Council from 1868 until 1874. Following his return to the United Kingdom, he continued his connection to Mauritius, and was Honorary Commissioner for Mauritius at the Colonial and Indian Exhibition in 1886, the same year he was appointed a Companion of the Order of St Michael and St George (CMG) for his services to Mauritius. He was a representative of Mauritius on the Governing Body of the Imperial Institute from its opening in 1888 until his death, and a Vice-President of the Royal Colonial Institute.

He served as a Lieutenant for the City of London from November 1892.

He was created Knight Commander of the Order of St Michael and St George (KCMG) in the New Year Honours list on 1 January 1900, and received the order from Queen Victoria during an investiture at Windsor Castle on 1 March 1900. He was a Knight (Chevalier) of the Belgian Order of Leopold.

He died at his residence, The Elms, Watford, on 14 May 1901.

== Family ==
Jourdain married first, in 1860, Rosina Augusta Bourguignon, daughter G. C. Bourguignon of Neuveville, Switzerland and Mauritius. Following her death, he married secondly, in 1884, Ada Mary Currie, 2nd daughter of James P. Currie by his first wife Anna Dora Brett, sister of William Brett, 1st Viscount Esher. He had several children, including:

- Henry James Jourdain
- Percy F. C. Jourdain, an officer in the King's Royal Rifle Corps
- Charles Edward George Jourdain
- Ada Violet Emily Jourdain (d.1946), who married Brigadier-General Charles Arthur Bolton (1882–1964), and left children.
- Evelyn Jessie Jourdain, who married William Edward Blackett-Ord
