= George Dalhousie Ramsay =

Sir George Dalhousie Ramsay, CB (died 1920) was a British military administrator.

== Biography ==
The seventh son of Sir Alexander Ramsay, 2nd Baronet, George Dalhousie Ramsay was educated in France and Germany. Aged 21, his uncle, Fox Maule-Ramsay, 2nd Baron Panmure (later the 11th Earl of Dalhousie), then Secretary at War, appointed him as his private secretary. He held the post when Lord Panmure was briefly President of the Board of Control in 1852, and when he was Secretary of State for War in Viscount Palmerston's cabinet.

In 1854, Ramsay was elected as secretary of the Royal Commission of Promotion in the Army. In 1855, his uncle appointed him assistant director of Army Stores and Clothing. In 1883, he became Director of Army Clothing, a post he held for 30 years. In that role, he was credited for the introduction of khaki.

Sir George was appointed a CB in 1882 and was knighted in 1900. In retirement, he (with Sir George Douglas) edited the papers of his uncle, which were published in two volumes.

He married in 1864 Juliet Charteris Crawfurd, daughter of John Crawfurd, FRS. They had one daughter. Lady Ramsay died in 1918.
