= Francis Ottiwell Adams =

British diplomat

Sir Francis Ottiwell Adams, KCMG, CB, FRGS (1825–1889) was a British diplomat who served in Japan and Switzerland.

Adams served as Secretary of the British Legation in Japan from 1868 to 1872 and as British Ambassador in Switzerland from 1881 to 1888. As Ambassador in Switzerland, he was among the signatories of the Bern Convention of 1886.

== Works ==
- The History of Japan from the Earliest Period to the Present Time (1874)
- The Swiss Confederation (1889)
