= Ashley Eden =

British colonial administrator and diplomat (1831–1887)

The Honourable Sir Ashley Eden KCSI CIE
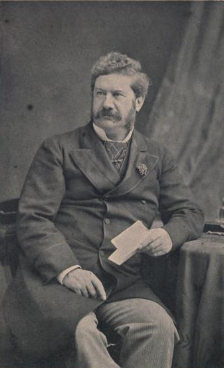

Chief Commissioner of Burma
- In office 18 April 1871 – 14 April 1875
- Preceded by: Albert Fytche
- Succeeded by: Augustus Rivers Thompson

Personal details
- Born: 13 November 1831 Hertingfordbury, Hertfordshire
- Died: 8 July 1887 (aged 55)
- Spouse: Eva Maria Money
- Relations: Robert Eden, 3rd Baron Auckland
- Education: Winchester
- Occupation: Administrator

Sir Ashley Eden KCSI CIE (13 November 1831 – 8 July 1887) was an official and diplomat in British India.

== Background and education ==
Eden was born at Hertingfordbury, Hertfordshire, the third son of Robert Eden, 3rd Baron Auckland, Bishop of Bath and Wells, by Mary Hurt, daughter of Francis Edward Hurt, of Alderwasley, Derbyshire. His uncle was George Eden, 1st Earl of Auckland. He was educated first at Rugby and then at Winchester, until 1849, in which year he received a nomination to the Indian civil service.

== Public life ==
Eden spent 1850 and 1851 at the East India Company's college at Haileybury, but did not pass out last of his term until December 1851. In 1852 he reached India, and was first posted as assistant to the magistrate and collector of Rájsháhí. In the year 1854 he was recruited as a sub divisional officer of Jangipur. In 1856 he was promoted to be magistrate at Moorshedábád, and during the Indian Mutiny he checked sympathy with the revolt in that city. In 1860 he was appointed secretary to the government of Bengal and an ex officio member of the Bengal legislative council. This post he held for eleven years, during the last part of Sir John Peter Grant's lieutenant-governorship, and throughout Sir Cecil Beadon's and Sir William Grey's terms of office.

In 1860 Eden accompanied a force ordered to invade the hill state of Sikkim in the Himalayas, as political agent, and in March 1861 he signed the Treaty of Tumlong with the raja, Sidkeong Namgyal, which secured protection to travellers and free trade. This success caused Eden to be appointed special envoy to the hill state of Bhutan in 1863. He was accompanied by no armed force and his demands were rejected. He signed a treaty favourable to the Bhutiás, after being assaulted by having his hair pulled and face rubbed with wet dough. This treaty was not ratified by the supreme government, and the Bhutan War resulted.

In 1871 Eden became the first civilian governor of British Burma, a post he held until his appointment in 1877 as lieutenant-governor of Bengal. The Eden Mohila College in Dhaka was named after him in 1878. In 1878 he was made a K.C.S.I., and in 1882 resigned the lieutenant-governorship. After his retirement from India, on being appointed a member of the secretary of state's council in 1882, admirers founded in his honour the Eden Hospital for Women and Children in Calcutta, and a statue was erected. The Eden canal joins the Ganges and the Tistá, and was intended to relieve Bihar from famine. Eden returned to England and attended the Council of India for the remainder of his life.

== Personal life ==
Eden married Eva Maria Money, daughter of Vice-Admiral Rowland Money. They had no children. Eden died suddenly of paralysis on 9 July 1887, aged 55.

== Notes ==
Government offices
Preceded by Albert Fytche	Chief Commissioner of British Crown Colony of Burma; 1871–1875	Succeeded by Sir Augustus Rivers Thompson
Preceded by Richard Temple	Lieutenant-governor of Bengal; 1877–1882	Succeeded by Sir Augustus Rivers Thompson
