= Charles Crosthwaite =

British colonial administrator

Sir Charles Crosthwaite KCSI

Chief Commissioner of Burma
- In office 12 March 1887 – 10 December 1890
- Preceded by: Charles Edward Bernard
- Succeeded by: Alexander Mackenzie

Chief Commissioner of Burma
- In office 2 March 1883 – 25 September 1886
- Preceded by: Charles Edward Bernard
- Succeeded by: Charles Edward Bernard

Personal details
- Born: 25 December 1835 Dublin, Ireland
- Died: 28 May 1915 (aged 79) Shamley Green, Surrey, England
- Spouse: Dame Caroline Alison Lushington
- Relations: Son of Rev. John Clarke Crostwaite
- Children: Gertrude Elizabeth Crosthwaite; Elaine Nelson Crosthwaite; Captain John Graham Crosthwaite; Henry Robert Crosthaite; Frederick Douglas Crosthwaite; Evelyn Alison Cheape Crosthwaite
- Education: Merchant Taylors' School; St John's College, Oxford
- Occupation: Administrator

Sir Charles Haukes Todd Crosthwaite KCSI (5 December 1835, Dublin – 28 May 1915) served as Chief Commissioner of the British Crown Colony of Burma from March 1887 to December 1890.

== Early life ==
He was born in Dublin, educated at Merchant Taylors' School. and St John's College, Oxford.

== Career ==
Crosthwaite entered into the Bengal Civil Service 1857 and served chiefly in the N.W.P. He was Chief Commissioner of British Burma from 1883 to 1884; then Chief Commissioner of Central Provinces from 1885 to 1886. From 1887 to 1890 Sir Charles Hawkes Todd Crosthwaite was Chief Commissioner of Burma. He was then a Member of the Governor-General's Supreme Council from 1890 to 1895; and Lieutenant Governor of N.W.P and Oudh from 1892 to 1895. He was a member of the Council of India from 1895 to 1905.

== Titles ==
- 1835–1887: Charles Hawkes Todd Crosthwaite
- 1887–1888: Charles Hawkes Todd Crosthwaite, CSI
- 1888–1915: Sir Charles Hawkes Todd Crosthwaite, KCSI

== Publications ==
- The Pacification of Burma

== Works ==
- "India: Past, Present, and Future" . The Empire and the century. London: John Murray. 1905. pp. 621–650.

Preceded by Sir Charles Edward Bernard	Chief Commissioner of British Crown Colony of Burma; 1883–1886	Succeeded by Sir Charles Edward Bernard
Preceded by Sir Charles Edward Bernard	Chief Commissioner of British Crown Colony of Burma; 1887–1890	Succeeded by Alexander Mackenzie
