= Harvey Adamson =

British administrator in Burma

Sir Harvey Adamson KCSI

Lieutenant-Governor of Burma
- In office 19 May 1910 – 28 October 1915
- Preceded by: Herbert Thirkell White
- Succeeded by: George Shaw

Personal details
- Born: 7 October 1854
- Died: 28 March 1941 (aged 86)
- Occupation: Administrator

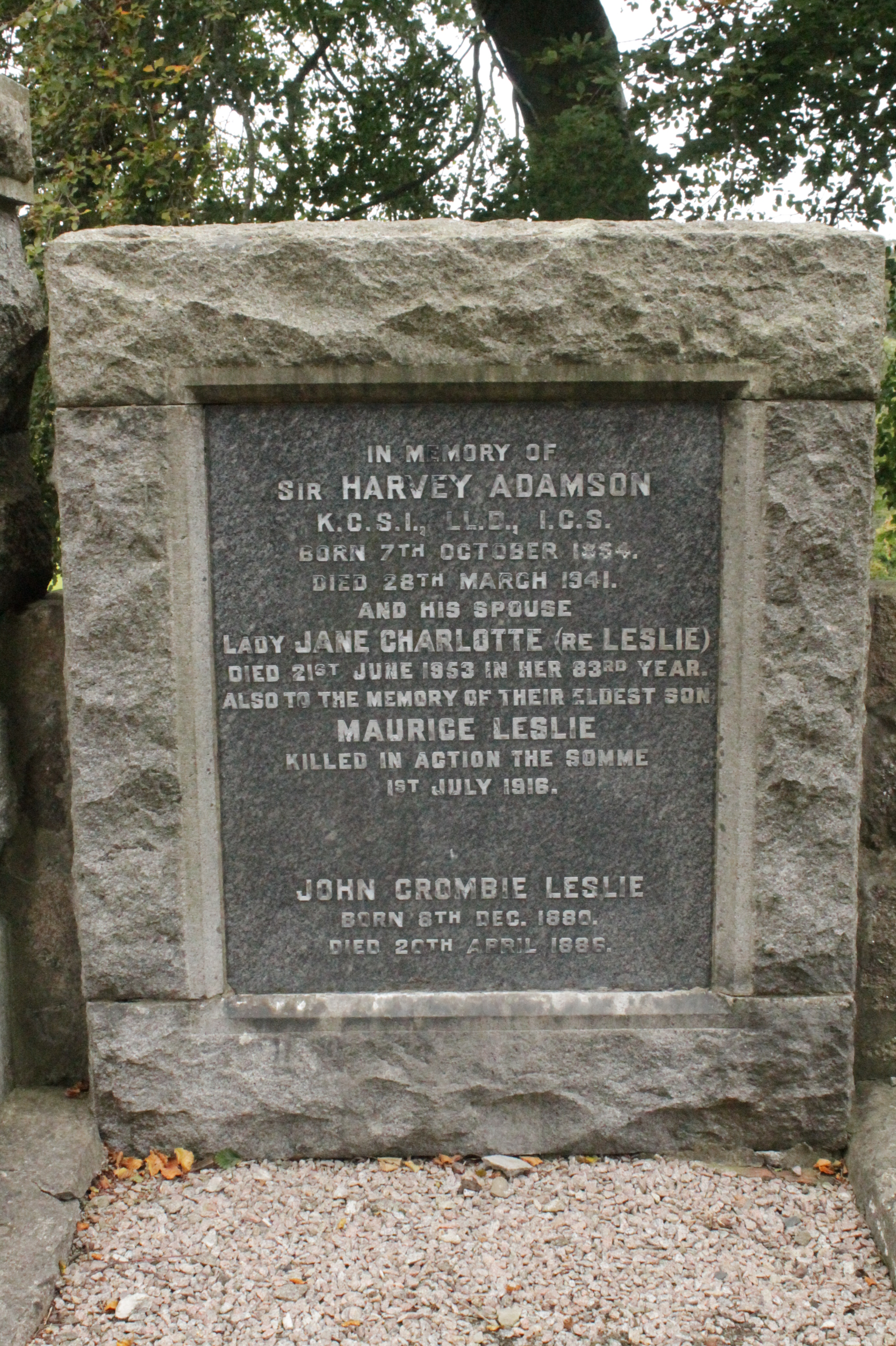
The grave of Sir Harvey Adamson, St Machar's Cathedral churchyard

Sir Harvey Adamson KCSI (7 October 1854 – 28 March 1941) was a member of the Indian Civil Service who served as an Ordinary Member of the Council of the Governor-General of India and Lieutenant-Governor of the British Crown Colony of Burma from May 1910 to October 1915, save for an interim period in 1913, when Sir George Shaw took the post.

== Life ==
The son of the Rev. Alexander Adamson of Kinnermit, Harvey Adamson was educated at the Gymnasium, Old Aberdeen and Aberdeen University, where he was Fullerton Scholar in Mathematics in 1873 and Ferguson Scholar in Mathematics in 1874.

He entered the Indian Civil Service by examination in 1875 and joined the Burma Commission in 1877. He was an assistant commissioner in Burma from 1877 to 1879, settlement officer from 1880 to 1885, deputy commissioner from 1886 to 1893, and commissioner from 1894 to 1899, chiefly of the Mandalay Division. From 1900 to 1905, he was judicial commissioner for Upper Burma, and from 1897 to 1900 he was lieutenant-colonel commanding, Upper Burma Volunteer Rifles, receiving the Burma Medal.

From 1903 to 1905, Adamson was an additional member of the Council of the Governor-General of India, become serving as Chief Judge of the Chief Court of Lower Burma from 1905 to 1906. He was Lieutenant-Governor of Burma from 1910 to 1915, and an ordinary member of the Council of the Governor-General of India from 1906 to 1910.

Adamson was appointed a Companion of the Order of the Star of India (CSI) in the 1903 Durbar Honours, knighted in 1906 and promoted to KCSI in 1910.

He died on 18 March 1941. He is buried in the churchyard of St Machar's Cathedral in Old Aberdeen. The grave lies on the north side of the church.

The steamship the "Sir Harvey Adamson" was launched on the River Clyde in 1914, built for the British India Steam Navigation Company by A & J Inglis. The ship and 269 passengers went missing at sea in 1947.

== Family ==
He married Jane Charlotte Leslie (1870–1953) in 1892; they had one son and one daughter. Their son, Maurice Leslie Adamson, was killed on the first day of the Battle of the Somme in the First World War. Their daughter, Isabel, married Sir William John Keith, colonial administrator in Burma.
