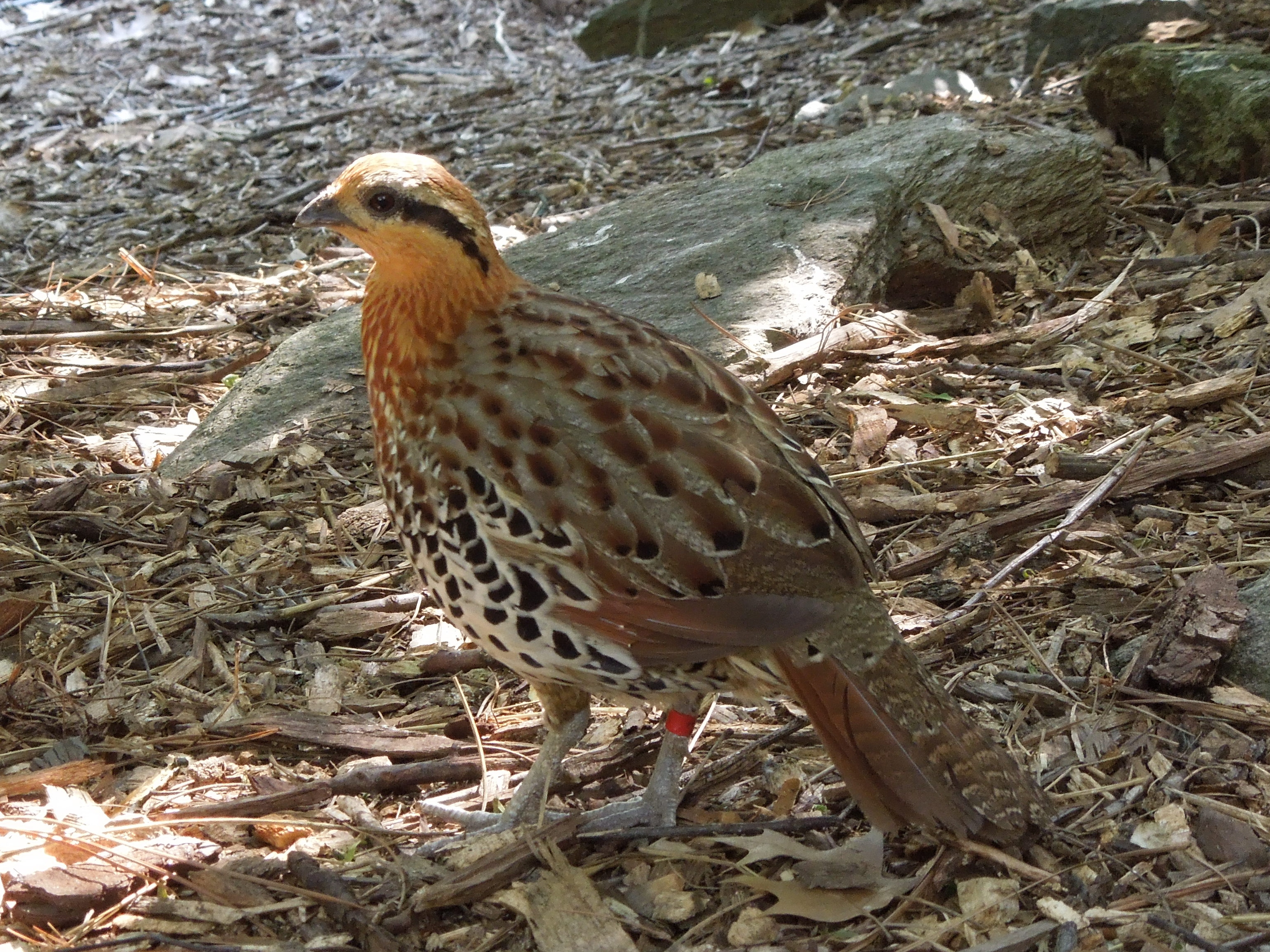
- Adult male at Smithsonian National Zoo, Washington, USA
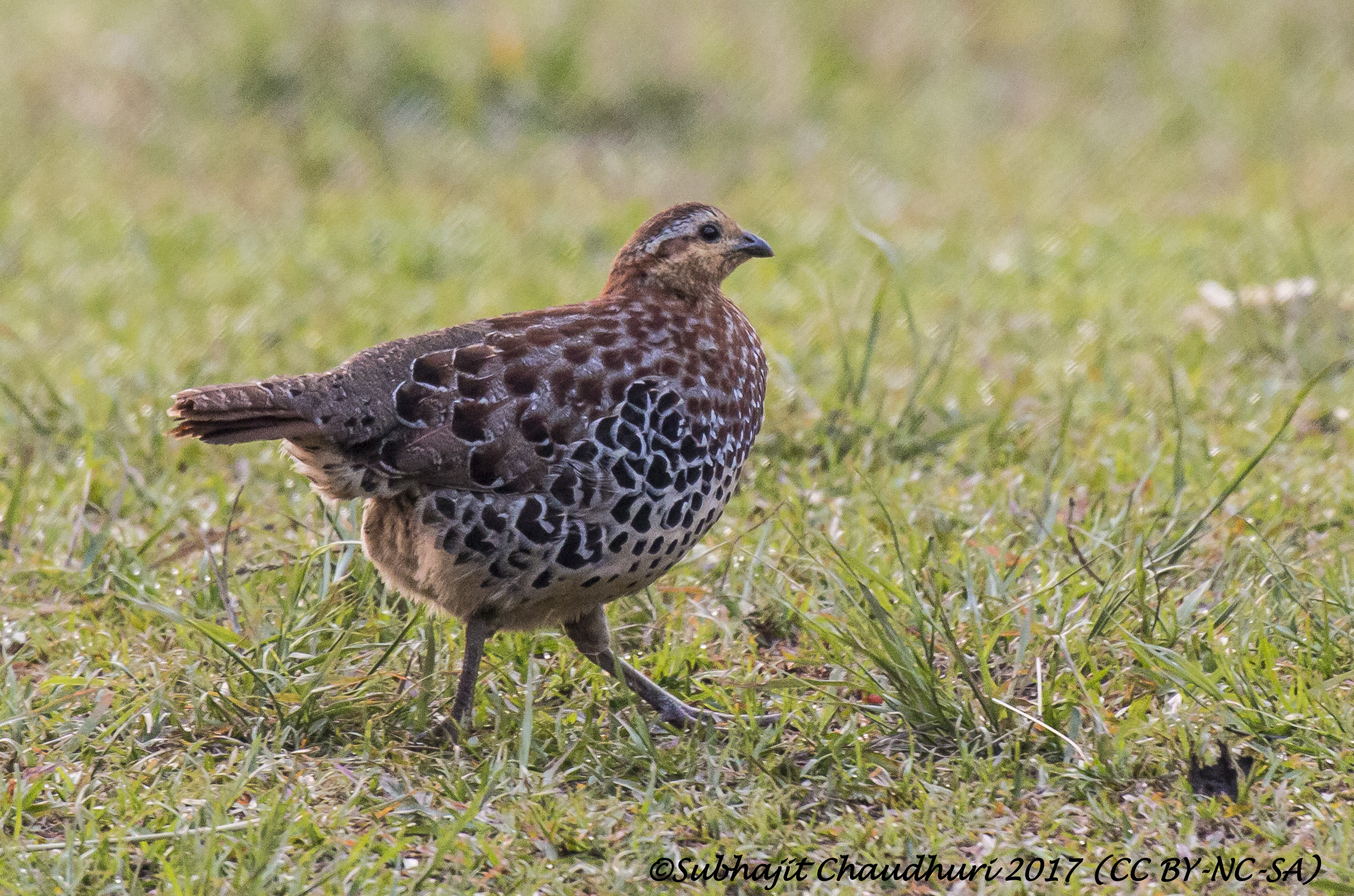
- Female at Khonoma, Nagaland, India

Conservation status
- Least Concern (IUCN 3.1)

Scientific classification
- Kingdom: Animalia
- Phylum: Chordata
- Class: Aves
- Order: Galliformes
- Family: Phasianidae
- Genus: Bambusicola
- Species: B. fytchii

Binomial name
- Bambusicola fytchii Anderson, 1871

= Mountain bamboo partridge =

Species of bird

The binomial commemorates Major-General Albert Fytche. The Conservation status according to the IUCN is least concern.

== Description ==
Adult male: The crown, nape and upper mantle are rufous-brown. A white supercilium contrasts with a black postocular band. The throat, lower ear-coverts and fore neck are rich buff, while the breast is broadly spotted and streaked with dark rufous. The whitish flanks are conspicuously marked with large, black, heart-shaped spots, whereas the central belly and undertail-coverts are largely unmarked buff. The upperparts are greyish olive-brown, with prominent black and chestnut spotting on the mantle, scapulars and wing-coverts. The rump, back and upper tail-coverts are grey and vermiculated. The primaries and secondaries are rufous. The outer tail feathers are rufous with brown barring, while the central tail feathers are barred buff and brown.

Adult female: Similar to the male, but differs in having a rufous, rather than blackish, postocular band.

Juvenile: Resembles the adult female but has a paler rufous crown and upperparts that are more buff-grey and less rufous. The breast is greyer and exhibits some dark barring.

== Habitat ==
The mountain bamboo partridge inhabits a variety of open and scrub-dominated environments at elevations of approximately 500–3,000 metres. Its preferred habitats include bamboo thickets, tall grassland, particularly in damp areas, open scrub, mixed vegetation and woodland containing oak and willow. It is also found in degraded forest and areas of secondary growth.

The species is frequently associated with areas near water and is sometimes recorded in scrubland and patches of woodland close to villages, including on partially cleared hillsides.

Mountain bamboo partridges spend much of the day concealed beneath shrubs and dense vegetation, generally emerging into more open areas to forage during the early morning and late evening. They are predominantly terrestrial and usually take flight only when disturbed or threatened, quickly returning to dense cover.

== Distribution ==
The mountain bamboo partridge (Bambusicola fytchii) is a species of bird in the family Phasianidae. It is native to South and Southeast Asia, with a distribution extending across Bangladesh, China, India, Laos, Myanmar, Thailand and Vietnam. It also occurs in Tibet.

== Taxonomy ==
Two subspecies. in the genus Bambusicola there are 3 species they are included in the subfamily Phasianinae as opposed to with the partridges.

== Behaviour ==
=== Vocalizations ===
The mountain bamboo partridge produces loud, resonant vocalizations consisting of rapidly repeated two-note calls, described as similar to those of the black francolin but less shrill. The call has been transcribed as "che-chiree-che-chiree", followed by repeated "chiree" notes. It has also been described as a continuous, chattering "pishup, pishup, pishup". When calling in groups, the combined vocalizations can create the impression of an entire covey calling simultaneously. Flushed birds produce loud screams, while females have been reported to make discordant squawking calls.

=== Diet ===
The mountain bamboo partridge feeds primarily on tender bamboo shoots and young foliage. Its diet also includes a variety of seeds, berries, other plant shoots and invertebrates.

=== Reproduction ===
Mountain bamboo partridges are often observed in groups believed to consist of family units. These groups remain together throughout the winter before dispersing around March.

During the breeding season, males become particularly vocal. They typically call from elevated positions before descending to the ground. The breeding season generally begins in April in China and may follow a similar pattern in Myanmar. Breeding activity rarely extends beyond July.

The nest is a shallow scrape on the ground, usually situated among scrub, bamboo or grassland vegetation and lined with grass and leaves. The typical clutch consists of four to six eggs, although clutches of up to eight have been recorded in captivity. The eggs are finely textured, unspotted and vary in colour from creamy buff to deep buff.

Incubation lasts approximately 18–19 days and is undertaken by the female alone. The male is believed to assist in caring for the chicks after hatching.
