= Frederick William Richards Fryer =

Sir Frederick Fryer KCSI

Lieutenant Governor of Burma
- In office 1 May 1897 – 4 April 1903
- Preceded by: Office established
- Succeeded by: Hugh Shakespear Barnes

Chief Commissioner of Burma
- In office 3 April 1895 – 1 May 1897
- Preceded by: Sir Alexander Mackenzie
- Succeeded by: Office dissolved

Personal details
- Born: 1845
- Died: 20 February 1922 (aged 76–77)
- Occupation: Administrator

Sir Frederick William Richards Fryer KCSI (1845 – 20 February 1922) served as Lieutenant Governor of the British Crown Colony of Burma from May 1897 to April 1903.

Prior to that, he had served as Chief Commissioner of British (Lower) Burma.

He was appointed a Companion of the Order of the Star of India (CSI) in 1890, and received a knighthood as Knight Commander of the same order (KCSI) in 1895.

== Early life and education ==
Fryer was born in West Moors, Dorset to Mr. F. W. Fryer. His maternal grandfather was Mr. John Richards who as a well-known MP of mid-Victorian days. He was educated at foreign schools and Bromsgrove Grammar School.

== Career ==
He passed Indian Civil Service examination in 1863. His first appointment was at Punjab and he was on special duty in 1878-1879 during Afghan War with Quetta field force. He became an officiating superintendent of Kapurthala State and a settlement officer of Dera Gazhi Khan. After Upper Burma was annexed in 1885, he was one of the officer to pick out to appointed as a commissioner of Central Burma. He was promoting the pacification of country after its annexation. He was appointed as Financial Commissioner of Burma in 1888 which is the position only second to Chief Commissioner. He returned to Punjab in 1891 as officiating Financial Commissioner. He also became a member of Supreme Legislature. In April 1895, he was appointed as a chief commissioner of Burma.

He received KCSI in 1895.

== Works ==
"Burma" . The Empire and the century. London: John Murray. 1905. pp. 716–727.

Political offices
Preceded by Alexander Mackenzie	Chief Commissioner of British Crown Colony of Burma; 1895–1897	Succeeded by last incumbent
Preceded by first incumbent	Lieutenant Governor of British Crown Colony of Burma; 1897–1903	Succeeded by Sir Hugh Shakespear Barnes
