= Charles Meldrum =

Scottish meteorologist and astronomer

Charles Meldrum (29 October 1821 – 28 August 1901) was a Scottish meteorologist and astronomer.

He was born at Kirkmichael, Banffshire, the son of farmer William Meldrum, of Tomintoul, Banffshire. He was educated at Marischal College, Aberdeen, where he was lord rector's prizeman and graduated M.A. in 1844.

In 1846 he was appointed to the education department, Bombay, and two years later was transferred to the Royal College of Mauritius as Professor of Mathematics. In 1851 he founded the Mauritius Meteorological Society, which he served for many years as secretary. In 1862 he was appointed government observer in charge of the small meteorological observatory then maintained at Port Louis, Mauritius, where he analysed ships' logs to work out the laws of cyclones in the Indian Ocean. He is credited as being the first to empirically confirm that cyclone winds blow in a spiral towards the centre of a storm, rather than in a circular motion. This observation was crucial for mariners navigating tropical seas.

As the site at Port Louis was unsuitable for a meteorological observatory, with the support of General Sir Edward Sabine, then President of the Royal Society, he was able to organise the construction of a new observatory on a marshy site in Pamplemousses District. There in 1870 the Duke of Edinburgh laid the foundation stone of the Royal Alfred Observatory which was operational by 1874. As before, the principal work of the observatory was the study of the movement of storms, but from 1880 photographs of the solar surface were taken daily to supplement the series made at Greenwich and Dehra Dun in north India to create a continuous record of the number of sunspots. The Pamplemousses observatory would be demolished in 1961 and its meteorological work transferred to Vacoas.

On 15 April 1868 Meldrum was elected a fellow of the Royal Meteorological Society. On 11 March 1870 he was elected a fellow of the Royal Astronomical Society. In 1876 Meldrum was elected a Fellow of the Royal Society, and in the same year the degree of LL.D. was conferred on him by the University of Aberdeen. He was made C.M.G. in 1886, and was a member of the governor's council from 1886 until his retirement from service in 1896, when he returned to England, settling at Southsea.

He had married, in Mauritius in 1870, Charlotte, the daughter of Percy Fitzpatrick.

He died in Edinburgh on 28 August 1901.
