= George Shaw (civil servant) =

British administrator in Burma

Sir George Watson Shaw CSI (3 January 1858 – 27 November 1931) was a British colonial civil servant who was Lieutenant Governor of the British Crown Colony of Burma from 15 May to 1 November 1913.

Shaw was born in Ardrossan, Ayrshire, Scotland, the son of Major Robert Shaw of the East India Company and his wife, John-Anne Kisson. He was educated at Hertford Grammar School and King's College, London. He entered the Indian Civil Service in 1879 and he joined the Burma Commission in the same year. He was appointed Commissioner of Burma in 1901, Judicial Commissioner of Upper Burma in 1905, and finally as Lieutenant-Governor for part of 1913.

He was appointed a Companion of the Order of the Star of India in 1908. He retired in 1914 and was knighted that same year.

He died in Fulham, London, aged 73.

Preceded by Sir Harvey Adamson	Lieutenant Governor of British Crown Colony of Burma; 1913–1913	Succeeded by Sir Spencer Harcourt Butler
