= List of colonial governors of Burma =

Governor of Burma
- Standard of the Governor, 1939–1948

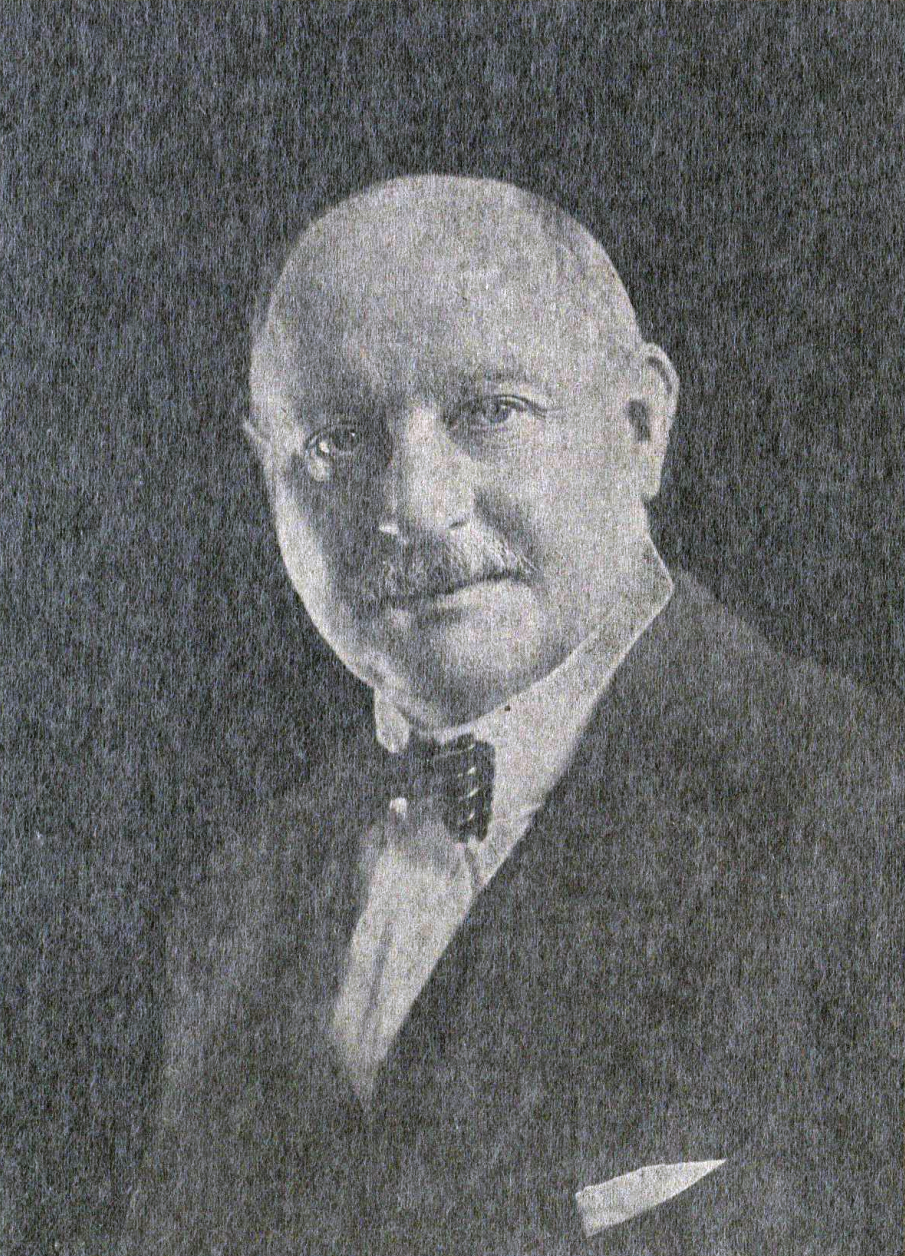
- Longest serving Sir Spencer Harcourt Butler; 28 October 1915–22 September 1917; 21 December 1922–20 December 1927
- Style: His Excellency
- Residence: Government House, Rangoon
- Appointer: Monarch of the United Kingdom
- Formation: 31 January 1862
- First holder: Arthur Purves Phayre
- Final holder: Sir Hubert Rance
- Abolished: 4 January 1948
- Succession: President of Myanmar

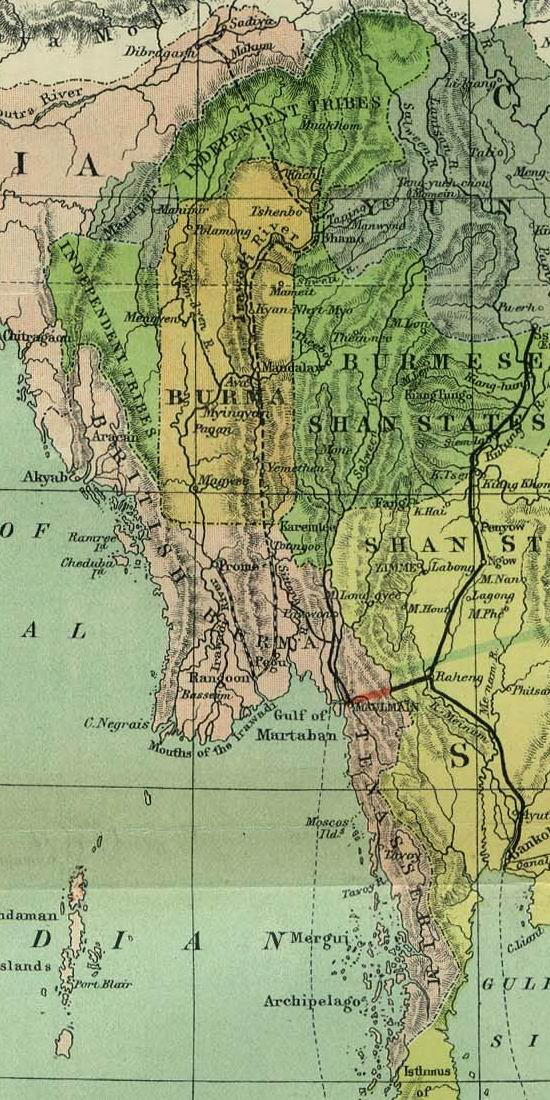
Burma (Upper [orange] and Lower [pink]), 1886.

The colonial governors of Burma were the colonial administrators responsible for the territory of British Burma, an area equivalent to modern-day Myanmar.

As a result of the Second Anglo-Burmese War, Burma was initially set up as a province of British India. Following the Government of India Act 1935 it was made a separate crown colony within the British Empire. Following invasion by the Empire of Japan during World War II, it was controlled by a Japanese military governor. After the Japanese were expelled, it was under an Allied military commander, then a civilian governor until independence.

== List ==
(Dates in italics indicate de facto continuation of office)

acting

No.	Portrait	Name (Birth–Beath)	Term of office		
No.	Portrait	Name (Birth–Beath)	Took office	Left office	Time in office
British Burma
Chief commissioner
1		Arthur Purves Phayre (1812–1885)	31 January 1862	16 February 1867	5 years, 16 days
2		Albert Fytche (1820–1892)	16 February 1867	18 April 1871	4 years, 61 days
3		Ashley Eden (1831–1887)	18 April 1871	14 April 1875	3 years, 361 days
–		Augustus Rivers Thompson (1829–1890)	14 April 1875	30 April 1877	2 years, 16 days
4		Augustus Rivers Thompson (1829–1890)	30 April 1877	30 March 1878	334 days
5		Charles Umpherston Aitchison (1832–1896)	30 March 1878	2 July 1880	2 years, 94 days
–		Charles Bernard (1837–1901)	2 July 1880	4 April 1882	1 year, 276 days
6		Charles Bernard (1837–1901)	4 April 1882	2 March 1883	332 days
–		Sir Charles Crosthwaite (1835–1915)	2 March 1883	28 February 1884	363 days
7		Sir Charles Crosthwaite (1835–1915)	28 February 1884	25 September 1886	2 years, 209 days
(6)		Charles Bernard (1837–1901)	25 September 1886	12 March 1887	168 days
(7)		Sir Charles Crosthwaite (1835–1915)	12 March 1887	10 December 1890	3 years, 273 days
8		Alexander Mackenzie (1842–1902)	10 December 1890	3 April 1895	4 years, 114 days
9		Frederick William Richards Fryer (1845–1922)	3 April 1895	1 May 1897	2 years, 28 days
Lieutenant governor
1		Frederick William Richards Fryer (1845–1922)	1 May 1897	4 April 1903	5 years, 338 days
2		Sir Hugh Shakespear Barnes (1853–1940)	4 April 1903	9 May 1905	2 years, 35 days
3		Sir Herbert Thirkell White (1855–1931)	9 May 1905	19 May 1910	5 years, 10 days
4		Sir Harvey Adamson (1854–1941)	19 May 1910	28 October 1915	5 years, 162 days
–		Sir George Shaw (1858–1931); Acting	15 May 1913	1 November 1913	170 days
5		Sir Spencer Harcourt Butler (1869–1938)	28 October 1915	22 September 1917	1 year, 329 days
–		Walter Francis Rice (1871–1941); Acting	22 September 1917	15 February 1918	146 days
6		Sir Reginald Craddock (1864–1937)	15 February 1918	21 December 1922	4 years, 309 days
5		Sir Spencer Harcourt Butler (1869–1938)	21 December 1922	2 January 1923	12 days
Governor
1		Sir Spencer Harcourt Butler (1869–1938)	2 January 1923	20 December 1927	4 years, 352 days
2		Sir Charles Alexander Innes (1874–1959)	20 December 1927	20 December 1932	5 years
3		Sir Hugh Lansdown Stephenson (1871–1941)	20 December 1932	8 May 1936	3 years, 140 days
4		Sir Archibald Douglas Cochrane (1885–1958)	8 May 1936	6 May 1941	4 years, 363 days
5		Sir Reginald Dorman-Smith (1899–1977)	6 May 1941	31 August 1946	5 years, 117 days
Japanese Occupation of British Burma
Military commander
1		Lieutenant general Shōjirō Iida (1888–1980)	20 April 1942	18 March 1943	332 days
2		General; Masakazu Kawabe (1886–1965)	18 March 1943	30 August 1944	165 days
3		General; Heitarō Kimura (1888–1948)	30 August 1944	15 August 1945	1 year, 350 days
Allied military administration
Military governor
1		Act. Admiral; Lord Louis Mountbatten (1900–1979)	1 January 1944	October 1945	1 year, 9 months
2		Major general Sir Hubert Rance (1898–1974)	October 1945	31 August 1946	10 months
British Burma
Governor
1		Sir Hubert Rance (1898–1974)	31 August 1946	4 January 1948	1 year, 126 days

== See also ==
- History of Myanmar
- List of Burmese monarchs
- President of Myanmar
  - List of heads of state of Myanmar since 1948
- Vice-President of Myanmar
- Prime Minister of Myanmar
  - List of premiers of British Burma
  - List of heads of government of Myanmar since 1948
- Deputy Prime Minister of Myanmar
- State Counsellor of Myanmar
- Chairman of the State Administration Council
