= Charles Bernard (civil servant) =

British colonial administrator (1837–1901)

Sir Charles Edward Bernard KCSI FRSGS
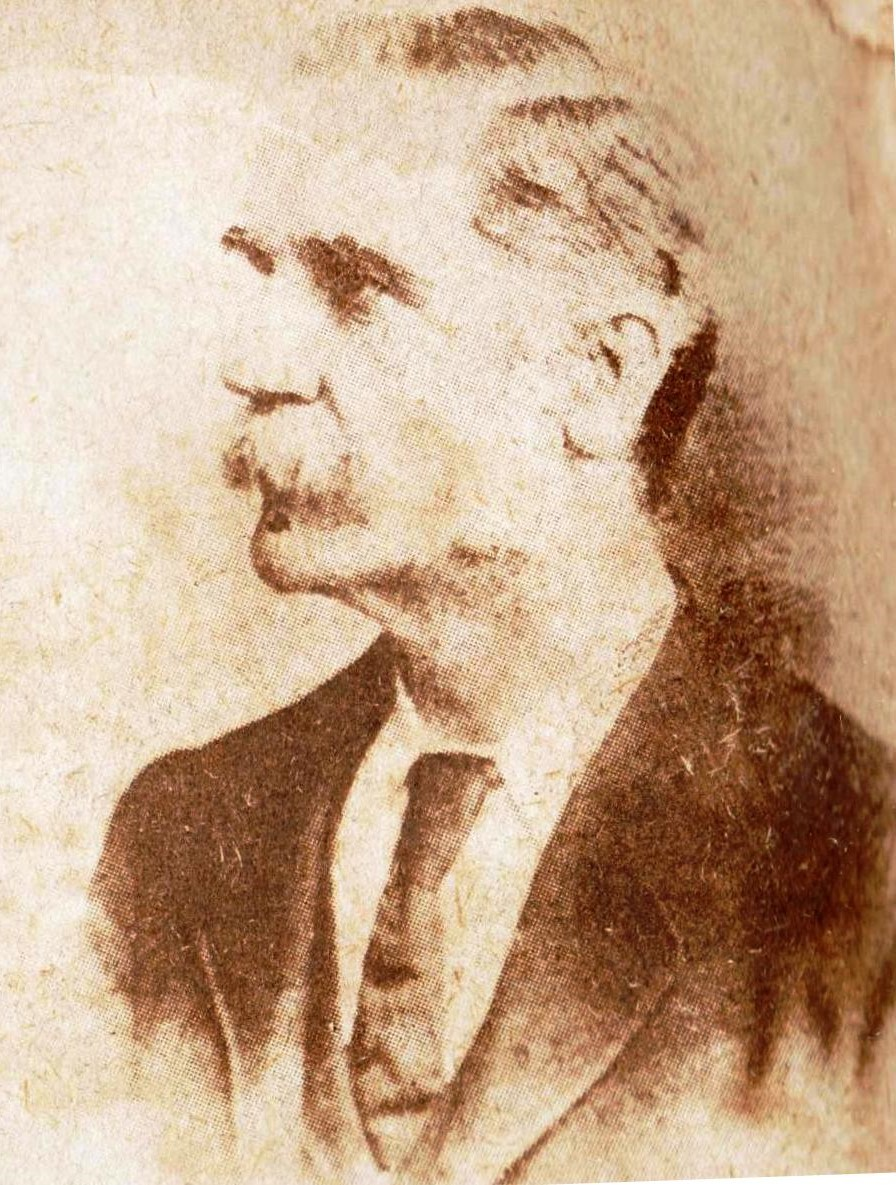

Chief Commissioner of Burma
- In office 25 September 1886 – 12 March 1887
- Preceded by: Charles Crosthwaite
- Succeeded by: Charles Crosthwaite

Chief Commissioner of Burma
- In office 2 July 1880 – 2 March 1883
- Preceded by: Charles Umpherston Aitchison
- Succeeded by: Charles Crosthwaite

Personal details
- Born: 21 December 1837 Bristol, England
- Died: 19 September 1901 (aged 63) Chamonix, France
- Spouse: Susan Capel Tawney (m. 1862)
- Children: 8
- Education: Haileybury and Imperial Service College
- Occupation: Administrator

Sir Charles Edward Bernard KCSI FRSGS (21 December 1837 – 19 September 1901) was a British colonial administrator.

== Biography ==
Charles Bernard was born in Bristol, England. He was the son of James Fogo Bernard, a medical physician and Marianne Amelia Lawrence, and was educated at Rugby School, Addiscombe, and Haileybury and Imperial Service College. In 1857 he passed into the ICS and was posted to the Punjab. From 1874 to 1877 he was Chief Commissioner of the Central Provinces. Three years later came the appointment as Chief Commissioner of Lower Burma from 2 July 1880 to 2 March 1883, followed by the appointment as Chief Commissioner of Burma from 25 September 1886 to 12 March 1887. From 1887 he was back in London as Secretary of the Department of Revenue, Statistics and Commerce, India Office.

In 1862 he married Susan Capel Tawney, and they had eight children.

He died on 19 September 1901 at Chamonix, France, after a short illness.

Preceded by Charles Umpherston Aitchinson	Chief Commissioner of British Crown Colony of Burma; 1880–1883	Succeeded by Sir Charles Haukes Todd
Preceded by Sir Charles Haukes Todd	Chief Commissioner of British Crown Colony of Burma; 1886–1887	Succeeded by Sir Charles Haukes Todd
