= Alexander Mackenzie (civil servant) =

British colonial administrator (1842–1902)

Sir Alexander Mackenzie KCSI
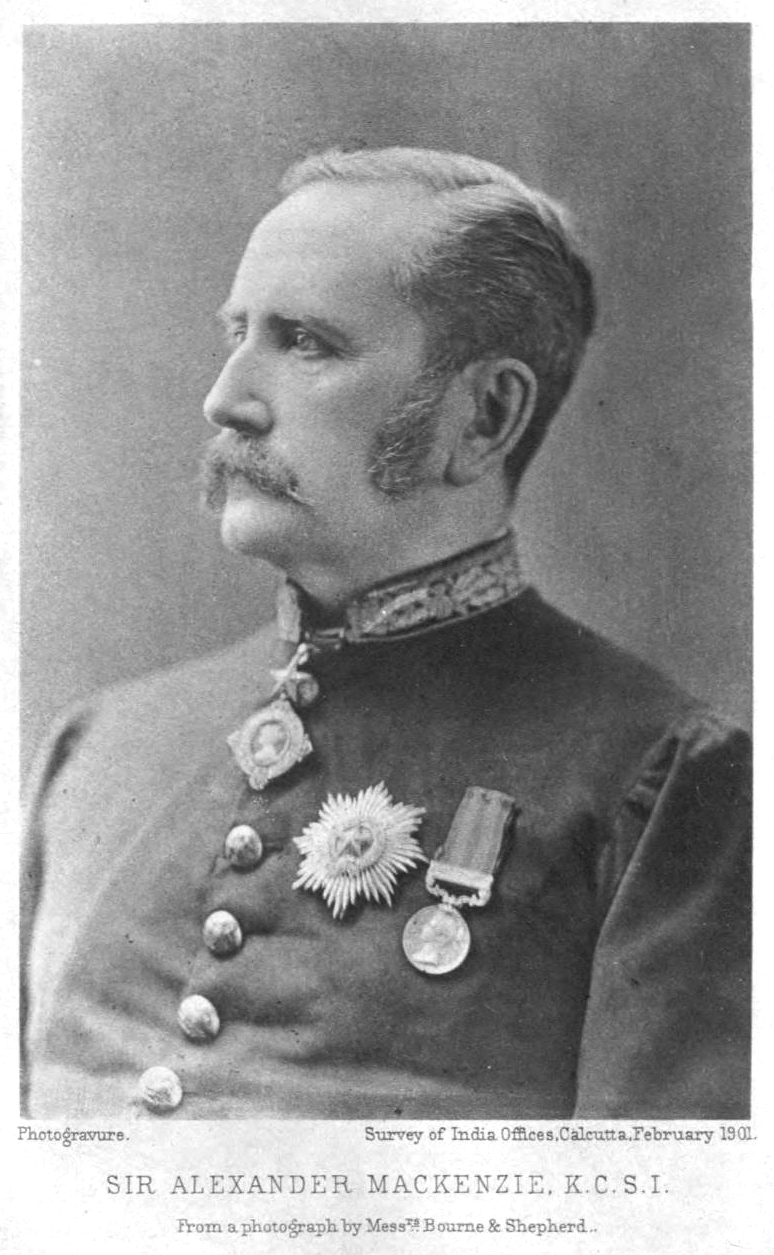
- Born: 28 June 1842; Dumfries, Scotland
- Died: 10 November 1902 (aged 60); Holmbury St Mary, Surrey, England
- Occupation: colonial governor

Sir Alexander Mackenzie, KCSI (28 June 1842 – 10 November 1902) was a British colonial official in India, who served as Chief Commissioner of the British Crown Colony of Burma from 1890 to 1895, and as Lieutenant-Governor of Bengal from 1895 to 1898.

== Background ==
Mackenzie was born in Dumfries, Scotland, to Reverend John R. Mackenzie and Alexanderina Mackenzie, and as a child moved with his parents to Birmingham, where his father worked for many years. He attended King Edward's School and Trinity College, Cambridge. Upon obtaining his BA and completion of his Indian Civil Service exams, Mackenzie joined the Bengal Civil Service and went to Calcutta in 1862.

== Early career ==
Mackenzie subsequently held a number of civil service appointments in the Bengal Presidency and British India. He was Secretary to the Bengali Government from 1877, and made a name for himself by compiling a history of the relations of the government with tribes on the north-east frontier of Bengal. In 1882 he was appointed Secretary in the Home Department of the Government of India. Five years later he received a senior colonial appointment as Chief Commissioner of the Central Provinces in 1887, and in December 1890 transferred to become Chief Commissioner of British Burma, where he stayed until 1895. The same year he was appointed a Member of the Council of the Governor General of India.

In 1891 he became a Knight Commander of the Order of the Star of India (KCSI).

== Bengal ==
After his service in Burma, he was in December 1895 appointed Lieutenant Governor of Bengal, where he served for three years. His short term in office was dominated by natural disasters, the province suffered plague, famine, earthquake and cyclone in those years. As an administrator he was a stern upholder of the rights of the province against what he perceived to be the financial encroachments of the British Indian government, and voiced this in the council, receiving opposition from the financial member of the council Sir James Westland. He cooperated with the Assam Administration in the conduct of the Lushai expedition in 1895–96.

In local administration, he initiated a survey and settlement in Orissa, took a keen interest in education and in the improvement of the Calcutta docks. He was probably mostly remembered for his work with the Calcutta Corporation to reform the Calcutta Municipal Act after a sanitary survey of the city found very unsatisfying conditions. His aloof ways in dealings with the city and corporation led to enmity with the Indian population and press.

His absence and negligence during his time in office made him unpopular amongst locals, but did not result in his removal from office.

Poor health led him to take six months leave from May 1897. He was back in Bengal by the end of the year, but was forced to retire permanently in March 1898 due to poor health. He returned to the United Kingdom and led a quite life, his only significant public office was as Chairman of the India Development Company.

He died at Radnor, Holmbury St Mary, Surrey, on 10 November 1902.

== Family ==
Mackenzie was twice married. His first wife from 1863 was Georgina Louisa Huntly Bremner (born 1838 India, and died 1892 Birmingham), youngest daughter of Colonel Bremner; and after her death he remarried in 1893 Mabel Elizabeth Elliot, youngest daughter of Ralph Elliot (1839–1874) and a granddaughter of Sir George Elliot, 1st Baronet. Lady Mackenzie survived him, and married another civil servant, the Hon. Noel Farrer, son of the 1st Baron Farrer. With his second wife, he had two children:

- Margaret Helen Mackenzie (b1896)
- Alastair Ian Mackenzie (b1897)

Preceded by Dennis Fitzpatrick	Chief Commissioner of the Central Provinces; 1887–1889	Succeeded by Sir Antony Patrick MacDonnell
Preceded by Sir Charles Haukes Todd	Chief Commissioner of British Crown Colony of Burma; 1890–1895	Succeeded by Frederick William Richard Fryer
Preceded by Sir Antony Patrick MacDonnell	Lieutenant-governor of Bengal; 1895–1898	Succeeded by Sir Charles Cecil Stevens
