= Chief commissioner =

A chief commissioner is a commissioner of high rank, usually in chief of several commissioners or similarly styled officers.

== Colonial ==
In British India the gubernatorial style was chief commissioner in various (not all) provinces (often after being an entity under a lower ranking official), the style being applied especially where an elected assembly did not exist, notably:

- Ajmer-Merwara 1 April 1871 – 15 August 1947 (the last date being the independence of India as a dominion, ending the colonial British Raj)
- Andaman and Nicobar Islands 1872 – August 1945
- Assam 1912 – 3 January 1921
- Baluchistan 19 June 1877 – 3 October 1947
- Central Provinces and Berar 13 March 1854 – 17 December 1920
- Coorg 10 April 1834 – 15 August 1947
- Delhi 1912 – 15 August 1947
- North-West Frontier Province 9 November 1901 – 18 April 2010
- Panth-Piploda May 1942 – 15 August 1947 sole incumbent Lieutenant-Colonel Sir Walter Fendall Campbell KCIE (1894–1973)
- Punjab (first 1 April 1849 – 1853 under a board of administration) till 1 January 1858 (only sole incumbent John Laird Mair Lawrence)

== Independent Commonwealth nations ==
=== Australia ===
On two occasions in the late 20th century, local elected government in the City of Melbourne was temporarily replaced by panels of commissioners headed by a chief commissioner.

Chief commissioner is also a rank used by Scouts Australia for the Adult Leader with operational control of Scouting in each State and Territory Branch. There is also a Chief Commissioner of Australia, a position which is more prestigious, although it carries less power.

Also in the state of Victoria, the head of police force is, unlike all the other states and territories, a 'chief commissioner' – as opposed to a 'commissioner'. The reason for this is, during Victoria's pre-federation history, there was more than one commissioner in the colony, one metropolitan and one for the goldfields, hence an additional degree of seniority was introduced. The office of chief commissioner has remained since.

=== Mauritius - Rodrigues ===
The island of Rodrigues which is part of the Republic of Mauritius has a chief commissioner since 12 October 2012 when the island was granted autonomy status. He/she is the head of the Rodrigues Regional Assembly.

=== India ===
In India the post of chief commissioner is in Indian Revenue Service (IRS) i.e. Central Excise & Customs Department & Income Tax Department. Usually the chief commissioner is above 3 or 4 commissioners of C&CE or IT

== Sources and references ==
- WorldStatesmen
- British India
